= List of council camps (Boy Scouts of America) =

List of Scout camps

List of Scouting council camps
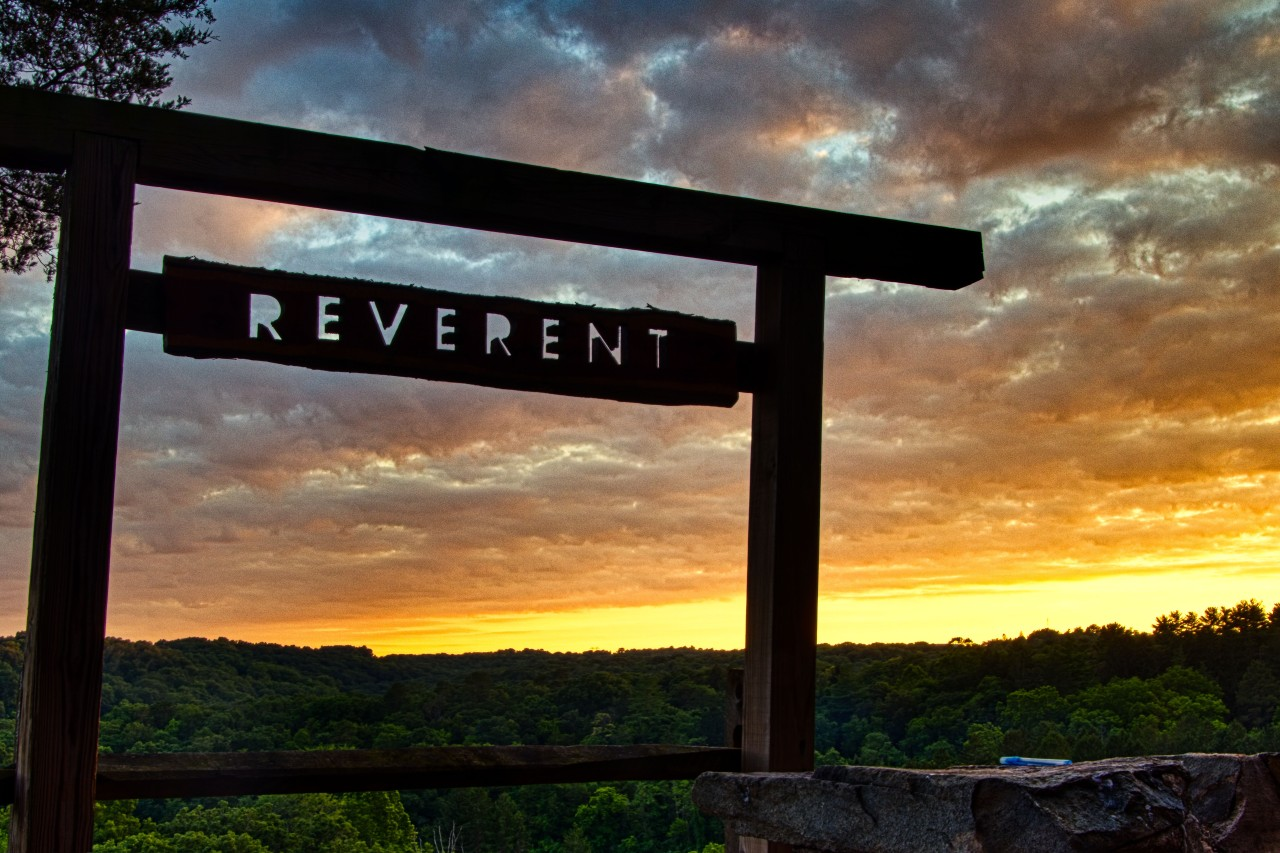
- Chapel Hill at Horseshoe Scout Reservation, a Scouting America camp.

There are hundreds of local council camps operated by Scouting America.

== Active Camps ==
=== Alabama ===
Camp name	Council	Location	Status	Notes
Camp Alaflo	Alabama-Florida Council	Enterprise	Active	
Camp Horne	Black Warrior Council	Cottondale	Active	Located in east Tuscaloosa County, Camp Horne is a 496-acre facility.
Camp Jack Wright	Greater Alabama Council	McCalla	Active	Located in the Roupes Valley, adjacent to Tannehill Ironworks Historical State Park
Camp Jackson	Greater Alabama Council	Scottsboro	Active	Camp Jackson is a 515-acre primitive camp located 5 miles east of Scottsboro on the Tennessee River at Jones Cove.
Camp O'Rear	Black Warrior Council	Jasper	Active	Camp O'Rear is a 90-acre primitive-style facility located in Jasper, AL.
Camp Pushmataha	Mobile Area Council	Citronelle	Active	Camp Pushmataha is no longer a council camp and is owned by the City of Citronelle. With a reservation from the city, Scout troops are welcome to camp there. It is a primitive camping facility. Pre-1960s it was the Mobile Area Council Camp.
Frank Spain Scout Reservation	Greater Alabama Council	Delta	Active	Also called Camp Sequoyah, a 1,447-acre camp in east central Alabama, near Cheaha State Park.
Hugh M. Comer Scout Reservation	Greater Alabama Council	Mentone	Active	
Maubila Scout Reservation	Mobile Area Council	Grove Hill	Active	Camp Maubila is 680 acres.
Warner Scout Reservation	Tukabatchee Area Council	Prattville	Active	Warner Scout Reservation includes two camps: Camp Tukabatchee and Camp Dexter C. Hobbs.
White Bluff Scout Reservation	Black Warrior Council	Demopolis	Active	A primitive camp located north of Demopolis, Alabama.

=== Alaska ===
Camp name	Council	Location	Status	Notes
Camp Gorsuch	Great Alaska Council	Mirror Lake	Active	
Eagle River Scout Camp	Great Alaska Council	Juneau	Active	
Denali High Adventure Scout Base	Great Alaska Council	Matanuska-Susitna Borough	Active	
Lost Lake Scout Camp	Midnight Sun Council	Salcha		400 acres, located 58.5 miles south of Fairbanks.
Northern Lights High Adventure Base	Midnight Sun Council	Fairbanks	Active	

=== Arizona ===
Camp Name	Council	Location	Status	Notes
Camp Geronimo	Grand Canyon Council	Payson	Active	Located north of Payson, east of Pine, on 200 acres below the Mogollon Rim. Surrounded by Tonto National Forest.
Camp Lawton	Catalina Council	Tucson	Active	Located on land, leased from the US forest service since 1921, in the Santa Catalina mountains outside of Tucson, Arizona.
Double V Scout Ranch	Catalina Council	Tucson	Active	Located on 360-acre six miles southwest of Tucson, near Tucson Mountain Park's Cat Mountain. The ranch was acquired on a long-term lease from the Bureau of Land Management in 1969.
Heard Scout Pueblo	Grand Canyon Council	Phoenix	Active	Located near 20th Street and Baseline Road in Phoenix, Arizona.
R-C Scout Ranch	Grand Canyon Council	Payson	Active	Located a half-hour east of Payson, the ranch is available to Boy Scout troops and Cub Scout packs for camping.
Raymond Scout Reservation	Grand Canyon Council	Parks	Active	Located 30 miles outside of Flagstaff, Arizona, between the Kaibab National Forest and the Coconino National Forest, along the rim of Sycamore Canyon.

=== Arkansas ===
Camp name	Council	Location	Status	Notes
Camp De Soto	De Soto Area Council	El Dorado	Active	Located outside Junction City, AR.
Camp Orr	Natural State Council	Harrison	Active	Camp Orr has been in use since 1955 and covers nearly 600 acres of the Buffalo National River Wilderness Area.
Camp Pioneer	Caddo Area Council	Hatfield	Active	
Camp Preston Hunt	Caddo Area Council	Texarkana	Active	
Camp Spencer	Natural State Council	Mountain Home	Active	A 100-acre primitive camping facility, located on the shore of Lake Norfork, east of Mountain Home, AR.
Gus Blass Scout Reservation	Natural State Council	Damascus	Active	Purchased in 1976, the reservation includes Camp Rockefeller and the Donald W. Reynolds Scout Training Center, located west of Damascus, Arkansas. The reservation was named the Cove Creek Scout Reservation and Camp Nile Montgomery until 2001.
Kia Kima Scout Reservation	Chickasaw Council	Hardy	Active	
Rogers Scout Reservation	Natural State Council	Booneville	Active	In 1973 the Arkansas State Legislature permitted the Westark Area Council to purchase 2,842 acres of the Booneville Sanatorium, just south of Booneville, Arkansas, which is now known as the Rogers Scout Reservation.

=== California ===
Camp name	Council	Location	Status	Notes
Cabrillo Beach Youth Waterfront Sports Center	Greater Los Angeles Area Council	San Pedro	Not Active	
Boulder Creek Scout Reservation	Pacific Skyline Council	Boulder Creek	Active	
Camp Balboa	San Diego-Imperial Council	San Diego	Active	
Camp Chawanakee	Sequoia Council	Shaver Lake, California	Active	
Camp Cherry Valley	San Gabriel Valley Council	Cherry Cove	Active	
Camp Cody	Troop 1, Sacramento CA	Near Strawberry CA	Active	Founded in 1937, run by Troop 1 of the Golden Empire Council.
Camp David Wortman	Sequoia Council	Badger	Active	
Camp Emerald Bay	Western Los Angeles County Council	Emerald Bay	Active	Has been operating since 1925.
Camp Emerson	California Inland Empire Council	Idyllwild-Pine Cove	Active	Operated since 1919.
Camp Fiesta Island	San Diego- Imperial Council	San Diego	Active	
Camp Fleischmann	Nevada Area Council	Chester	Active	
Camp Helendade	California Inland Empire Council	Running Springs	Active	Operated since 1960 and located near Running Springs, California. It was partially burned in the California fires of October 2007.
Camp Herms	Mt. Diablo Silverado Council / Golden Gate Area Council	El Cerrito	Active	
Camp Hi-Sierra	Silicon Valley Monterey Bay Council	Long Barn	Active	Located in the Sierra Nevada Mountain Range. This camp is at a notably high altitude, with the majority of its buildings standing at approximately 4,800 feet and the highest point of the mountain standing over a mile high at 5,300 feet.
Camp Isom	Greater Yosemite Council	Orestimba Creek	Active	
Camp John Mensinger	Greater Yosemite Council	Stanislaus National Forest	Active	
Camp Kern	Southern Sierra Council	Huntington Lake	Active	
Camp Lassen	Golden Empire Council	Butte Meadows	Closed	
Camp Marin-Sierra	Marlin Council	Tahoe National Forest	Active	
Camp McConnell	Greater Yosemite Council	Livingston	Active	
Camp Mirimichi	Mount Whitney Area Council		Private, operated by Camp Gold Arrow	
Camp Nejedly				
Camp Noyo	Redwood Empire Council		Active	Located on the Noyo River in Mendocino County, CA. Currently Privately owned
Camp Okihi			Active	
Camp Oljato	Pacific Skyline Council	Lakeshore, CA	Active	Located at Huntington Lake in Lakeshore, CA, and was founded in 1941 as a Jewish boys' singing camp.
Camp Pahatsi	Golden Empire Council	Soda Springs	Closed	
Camp Pomponio				
Camp Riggs Johnston	Crater Lake Council	Eureka	Active	Formerly Elk River Scout Camp
Camp Robert L. Cole	Golden Empire Council	Cisco Grove, CA	Active	
Camp Royaneh / Camp CC Moore	San Francisco Bay Area Council / Golden Gate Area Council	Cazadero, CA	Active	1925–present. Camp Royaneh was renamed to Camp CC Moore in honor of SF Council President and National BSA Vice-president Charles C. Moore from 1938 until 1950. Its name was changed back to Camp Royaneh in 1950/1951.
Camp Silver Fir	Verdugo Hills Council	Lakeshore	Active	
Camp Tahquitz	Long Beach Area Council	Angelus Oaks	Active	
Camp Tamarancho	Marin Council	Farifax	Active	
Camp Three Falls	Ventura County Council	Frazier Park	Active	
Camp Verdugo Oaks	Verdugo Hills Council		Active	
Camp Whitsett	Western Los Angeles County Council		Active	Located in the Sequoia National Forest.
Camp Winton	Golden Empire Council	Bear River Reservoir	Active	Operated since 1958
Camp Wolfeboro	Golden Gate Area Council		Active	
Chesebrough Scout Reservation	Silicon Valley Monterey Bay Council		Active	Also called Camp Chesebrough, this is a 544-acre (2.2 km^{2}) Boy Scouts of America camp in the Santa Cruz Mountains of Santa Cruz and San Mateo counties, California.
Circle X	Los Angeles Area Council	Cedar Glen	Active	Camp Circle X at Big Horn. Part of Hubert Eaton Scout Reservation.
Cutter Scout Reservation	Pacific Skyline Council	Boulder Creek	Active	
Firestone Scout Reservation	Greater Los Angeles Area Council	Brea	Active	Located just east of State Route 57 in Tonner Canyon between Diamond Bar and Brea, California.
Forest Lawn Scout Reservation aka Hubert Eaton Scout Reservation	Greater Los Angeles Area Council	Lake Arrowhead	Active	Located 3 miles (5 km) east of Lake Arrowhead, California, formerly known as the Lake Arrowhead Scout Camps. The Forest Lawn Scout Reservation consists of five active and one closed Boy and Cub Scout resident camps on more than 2,000 acres in the San Bernardino National Forest. The six camps are: Circle X Ranch at Big Horn; Camp Pepperdine, Camp Pitchess, formerly Camp Cedar (closed); Camp Pollock – adjacent to what was once Camp Pitchess; John Wayne Outpost – wilderness camping area; Northrop Family Camp
Holcomb Valley Scout Ranch	San Gabriel Valley Council	Big Bear	Closed	Located north of Big Bear Lake in the old mining district of Belleville in the Holcomb Valley, on the site of the old Hitchcock Ranch.
Irvine Ranch Outdoor Education Center	Orange County Council	Orange	Active	190 Acres
Long Beach Sea Base	Long Beach Area Council	Long Beach	Active	
Lost Valley Scout Reservation	Orange County Council	Warner Springs	Closed	Schoepe Scout Reservation at Lost Valley
Marina Wilderness Camp				
Mataguay Scout Reservation	San Diego-Imperial Council	Santa Ysabel	Active	
Newport Sea Base	Orange County Council	Newport Beach	Active	
Oso Lake	Orange County Council	Rancho Santa Margarita	Active	
Pendola Sierra Adventure base	Greater Yosemite Council	Emigrant Wilderness Area	Active	
Rancho Alegre	Los Padres Council	Lake Cachuma	Active	
Rancho Los Mochos	Oakland Area Council / San Francisco Bay Area Council / Golden Gate Area Council	Livermore	[www.rancholosmochos.org Active]	1945–present. Located in the hills south of Livermore. 640 acres. Three camping areas: Blue Oak Ridge, Manzanita Flats, and Deadwood.
Sierra North High Adventure				
Stockton Sea Scout Base				
Three Falls Camp	Ventura County Council	Frazier Park, CA	Active	
Trask Scout Reservation	Greater Los Angeles Area Council	Monrovia	Active	Located above the Sawpit Dam off of Monrovia Canyon Park.
Wente Scout Reservation / Willits Scout Reservation	Oakland Area Council / San Francisco Bay Area Council / Golden Gate Area Council	Willits	Active	1959–present. 2200 acres located in the hills east of Willits. First camping took place in October 1959, and the first summer camp took place in July 1964. It was renamed to Wente Scout Reservation in 1978 in honor of San Francisco Council Board Member and Bank of America President Carl F. Wente. www.wentescoutreservation.org
Camp Willett	Ventura County Council	Oak View, California	Active	

=== Colorado ===
Camp name	Council	Location	Status	Notes
Ben Delatour Scout Ranch	Adventure West Council	Red Feather Lakes, Colorado	Active	Encompassing 3,200 acres at Red Feather Lakes, Colorado, it includes four Scout camps.: Jack Nicol Cub Scout Camp; Camp Charles Jeffrey; Camp Ruth Coffin; Elkhorn High Adventure Base
Camp Alexander	Pathway to the Rockies Council	Eleven Mile Canyon	Active	Camp Alexander is located in the beautiful Eleven-mile Canyon in the Pike National Forest approximately 45 miles west of Colorado Springs, and two miles south of Lake George, in Park County, Colorado. The elevation at Camp Alexander varies between 8200 and 8600 feet, and the camp area consists of hills, low mountains, and valleys covered by a mix of Ponderosa pine forests, high-altitude grasslands, and wetland vegetation along the lake and stream. There is abundant wildlife including, rabbits, squirrels, deer, elk, bears, and bald eagles.
Camp Laramie Peak	Adventure West Council	Wheatland, Wyoming	Active	
Camp Patiya	Adventure West Council	Boulder, Colorado	Active	
Chimney Park Scout Camp	Adventure West Council	Woods Landing, Wyoming	Active	
Colorado Adventure Point (CAP)	Greater Colorado Council	Lakewood, Colorado	Active	Colorado Adventure Point (CAP) strives to create life-long learners through the modality of experiential education and positive growth. We prioritize inclusion and are open to everyone, always endeavoring to exceed the expectations of those we work with.
Glen Aspen Ranch	Pathway to the Rockies Council	Woodland Park, CO	Active	Glen Aspen Ranch is a beautiful 200 acre ranch located on the outskirts of Woodland Park, CO, perfectly suited for our outdoor training courses like BALOO, IOLS, NYLT and Wood Badge. Glen Aspen Ranch is only 35 minutes from Colorado Springs but you'll think you were a hundred miles away!
Tahosa High Adventure Base	Greater Colorado Council	Ward, Colorado	Closed	Located near Ward, Colorado this was the primary camp for the Denver area until the late 1970s, when it was shut down because of damage caused by environmental factors. The camp was recently re-opened as a high adventure base.
O.A. Greager Scout Ranch	Greater Colorado Council	Norwood, Colorado	Closed	
McNeil Scout Ranch at Peaceful Valley	Greater Colorado Council	Elbert, Colorado	Active	With more than 3,300 acres of land, there are endless possible adventures available for Scouts of all ages at McNeil Scout Ranch at Peaceful Valley. This regional camp includes a swimming pool, two lakes, Olympic shotgun shooting range (along with world-class rifle and archery ranges), one of Colorado's premier mountain biking courses, natural rocking climbing areas, trading post, dining hall, two themed outpost camps, and that barely scratches the surface! Additionally, it's near Colorado Springs and surrounding areas where campers go white water rafting, hike a 14er, or explore caves. Three nationally accredited camps make up MSR, which is located at 7,000 feet in elevation near the town of Elbert, Colorado.
Rocky Mountain High Adventure Base	Pathway to the Rockies Council	Rye, Colorado	Closed	Formerly Packard High Adventure Base.
San Isabel Scout Ranch	Pathway to the Rockies Council	Rye, Colorado	Closed	
Spanish Peaks Scout Ranch	Quivira Council	Walsenburg, Colorado	Closed	

=== Connecticut ===
Camp name	Council	Location	Status	Notes
Camp Aquila (formerly Camp Mauwehu)	Connecticut Yankee Council	Candlewood Lake, Sherman, CT	Closed	Located on Candlewood Lake in Sherman, CT., the camp was sold in 1982 along with Camp Toquam in Goshen.
Camp Cochipianee	Bristol Area Council	Goshen, CT	Closed	The camp was founded in 1928 by the Bristol Area Council and was sold after the New Britain Area Council and the Bristol Area Council were merged in 1972.
Camp Irving	Housatonic Council	Shelton, CT	Closed	The camp was located in Shelton in the Birchbank area along the Housatonic River. It was closed in 1945 and the buildings were razed in 1948.
Camp Nahaco	Connecticut Rivers Council	Woodstock, CT	Sold	Previously called Camp Keemosabee, the camp was purchased by the towns of Woodstock and Eastford on March 3, 2003. The 120-acre site is now permanently protected from development and the Boy Scouts still have use of the property.
Camp Pioneer	Long Rivers Council	New Hartford, CT	Closed	Located on the shores of West Hill Pond, adjacent to Camp Sequassen, it was sold in 1985 and has since been developed.
Camp Pomperaug	Connecticut Yankee Council	Union, CT	Active	For a time the camp was leased to the Ct Burn Foundation as a summer camp for children with severe burns; however, it has since been changed back into a Scout camp.
Camp Sequassen	Connecticut Yankee Council	New Hartford, CT	Active	Located at 791 West Hill Road in New Hartford, Connecticut.
Camp Toquam	Connecticut Yankee Council	Goshen, CT	Closed	The camp was sold in 1982 along with Camp Aquila in Sherman.
Camp Workcoeman	Connecticut Rivers Council	New Hartford, CT	Active	Established in 1924 and located on the shore of West Hill Pond.
Deer Lake Scout Reservation	Connecticut Yankee Council	Deer Lake, Killingworth, CT	Sold	It was originally owned by Central Connecticut Council until the merger with Quinnipiac Council. It was sold in 2022 to Pathfinders Inc., a non-profit organization which plans to continue to operate the property as a camp.
Edmund D. Strang Scout Reservation	Housatonic Council	Goshen, CT	Active	Formally called Housatonic Scout Reservation.
Ernest Thompson Seton Scout Reservation	Greenwich Council	Greenwich, CT	Active	A 249-acre camp located off 363 Riversville Road in Greenwich.
Frederick Sprague Barbour Scout Reservation	Connecticut Rivers Council	Norfolk, CT	Active	106-acre wilderness camp
John Sherman Hoyt Scout Reservation	Connecticut Yankee Council	Redding, CT	Active	The 174-acre reservation was donated to the Alfred W. Dater Council by Alice B. Sanford in 1966.
June Norcross Webster Scout Reservation	Connecticut Rivers Council	Ashford, CT	Active	Originally opened as Camp Ashford on June 28, 1964, today the reservation occupies 1,200 acres (4.9 km2) of land.
Lake of Isles Scout Reservation	Long Rivers Council	North Stonington, CT	Sold	This reservation included Camp Apache, Camp Pequot, and Camp Cherokee. With the construction of the Mashantucket Pequot Casino in 1991–1992, the camp's surroundings had been changed enough that the Long Rivers Council decided to sell the property to the Native American tribe in 1992. The Mashantucket nation has since converted the land into a golf course.
Mark Greer Scout Reservation	Connecticut Rivers Council	Bozrah, CT	Sold	It is home to Camp Tadma, a Cub Scout summer resident camp and Camp Wakenah, a Cub Scout day camp previously located on Gardner Lake in Salem. The reservation was known almost exclusively as Camp Tadma until 2004. Camp Tadma was closed in 2013, much to the sorrow of the staff and dedicated Scout troops who had grown to love the camp. The camp was sold in 2014 and is now owned by a church.
Mattatuck Scout Reservation	Connecticut Rivers Council	Plymouth, CT	Active	Mattatuck Council purchased 170 acres in 1938 and the camp opened the following year.
Wah Wah Tay See	Connecticut Yankee Council	North Haven, CT	Active	
Camp Wakenah	Pequot Council	Salem, Connecticut	Sold by the Connecticut Rivers Council in 2005	
Camp Quinebaug	Eastern Connecticut Council	Preston, Connecticut	Outgrown by ECC and closed to open the June Norcross Webster Scout Reservation in 1965	Now a private campground, Hidden Acers

=== Delaware ===
Camp name	Council	Location	Status	Notes
Akridge Scout Reservation	Del-Mar-Va Council	Dover, Delaware	Active	Located on 85 acres (0.3 km^{2}) of farmland in Dover, Delaware.

=== Florida ===
Camp name	Council	Location	Status	Notes
Camp Alafia	Greater Tampa Bay Area Council	Lithia, FL	Active	
Camp Dark Hammock	Gulf Stream Council	Okeechobee, FL	Active (leased)	
St. Johns River Base at Echockotee	North Florida Council	Orange Park, FL	Active	
Camp Elmore	South Florida Council	Davie, FL	Active	Formerly Camp Seminole.
Camp Everglades	South Florida Council	Homestead, FL	Active	
Camp Flying Eagle	Southwest Florida Council	Bradenton, FL	Active	Located as part of the Harry Sudakoff Scout Reservation.
Camp Frederick M. Small	Gulf Stream Council	Jupiter, FL	Closed	Segregated camp established 1945. Property sold 1970s.
Camp Howard	Central Florida Council	Longwood, FL	Closed	Segregated Scout Camp operated until the 1960s. Property sold mid-1970s.
Leonard and Marjorie Williams Family Scout Reservation	Central Florida Council	Lake Norris	Active	Leonard and Marjorie Williams Family Scout Reservation and Camp La-No-Che are located on the north shore of Lake Norris in Paisley, FL on 1,480 acres adjacent to the Ocala National Forest. The camp has brand new aquatics, and adventure camp facilities that include the zip line/Adventure Tower, two lighted swimming pools with slide and diving board, and two lakefront aquatics areas.
Camp Loxahatchee	Gulf Stream Council		Active	Part of Tanah Keeta Scout Reservation.
Camp Miles	Southwest Florida Council		Active	Located outside of Punta Gorda, Florida.
Camp Oklawaha	Gulf Stream Council		Active	Located outside of Sebastian, Florida.
Camp Osprey	South Florida Council		Closed	Opened in 1974 on the McGregor Smith Scout Reservation, it was only active for one year before being closed.
Camp Owen Brorein	Greater Tampa Bay Area Council	Odessa, FL	Active	Centrally located in the Hillsborough County community of Odessa, Camp Brorein is the council's oldest camping facility. Located at 16901 Boy Scout Rd., Odessa 33556, this camp has been dedicated to the advancement of Scouting from its founding in 1923. The camp has a long, rich history of serving Scouts and youth in the surrounding area. Situated on more than 80 acres of land, surrounded by two lakes and blessed by the shade of many Live Oak trees, Camp Brorein provides the ideal camping experience for all. With newly built bouldering, climbing and rappelling walls, the Camp also has an indoor dining area, classroom and training space, new canoes and kayaks, plus a shooting sports range for BBs, slingshots and archery. There is even a playground for younger children to explore. The waterfront includes both canoes and kayaks, which can be launched from the pier on Lake Moon. Fishing is also available in our lakes. The property includes many open areas for arts, crafts and games. There is ample room to just run and play. Other amenities include permanent tents in some campsites, a new bathhouse facility, stage area with flag pole, a fire ring and an open air chapel.
Camp Reed	Pinellas Area Council	Clearwater, FL	Former Segregated Scout Camp, adjacent to Camp Soule, near Safeto Harbor, FL. Ended 1960s.	
Camp Sawyer	South Florida Council		Active	Near Big Pine Key, FL on "Scout Key", about 30 miles east of Key West.
Camp Sebring				Former Scout camp near Inverness, FL. Sold in 1970s.
Camp Semialachee				Former camp late 1940s to mid 1960s. Near Tallahassee, FL
Camp Shands	North Florida Council	Hawthorne, FL	Active	Also known as Baden Powell Scout Reservation.
Camp Soule	Greater Tampa Bay Area Council	Clearwater, FL	Active	Camp Soule consists of 53 acres of pristine wilderness, located in the heart of Clearwater. It offers protected trees, wildlife and beauty. The camp has five campsites, a dining hall, health lodge, chapel, maintenance building, trading post, field sports range, two cabins, a campfire ring, a camp master cabin and a home occupied by the full time camp Ranger and his family. Camp Soule is used for short-term camping, family camping, training, day camps and various other activities.
Camp Stine				Former weekend camping property.
Charles H. Topmiller Canoe Base				Formerly near McGregor-Smith Scout Reservation.
Flaming Arrow Scout Reservation	Greater Tampa Bay Area Council	Lake Wales, FL	Active	Born in 1965 near beautiful Cypress Gardens (now Legoland), Flaming Arrow Scout Reservation is located near national landmark Bok Tower at 1201 Boy Scout Road in Lake Wales, Florida. The 677-acre camp is known for pristine wilderness and three clear spring-fed, natural lakes.
Florida National HA Sea Base				
La-No-Che Scout Reservation	Central Florida Council		Active	Short term name for Leonard and Marjorie Williams Family Scout Reservation.
McGregor Smith Scout Reservation	Greater Tampa Bay Area Council	Inverness, FL	Closed	Also known as Camp Lone Oak. The camp was established in 1972, but the 4,964-acre site was purchased by the Southwest Florida Water Management District in 2004 and closed in 2014.
Rocky Pine Scout Camp				Segregated Scout Camp south of Miami, ca. 1956. See also Snapper Creek Camp.
Ro-Pa-Co				Camp for Royal Palm Council of Naples, FL. Council existed 1920s to early 1930s.
Sand Hill Scout Reservation	Greater Tampa Bay Area Council	Brooksville, FL	Active	This is a 1,300-acre camp, recognized as a premier Scout Summer Camp in the area, offering numerous programs such as archery, rifle and shotgun, canoeing, rappelling and swimming. In addition to its use in the summer, it has 12 campsites that are used year-round. More than 100,000 Scouts, leaders and outside organizations use the camps for training, camping and activities each year.
Snapper Creek Camp	Dade County Council and South Florida Council		Closed	Originally part of the Dade County Council (reorganized in 1944 as the present-day South Florida Council), Snapper Creek Camp operated from 1940 to 1956. [Miami. FL].
Spanish Trail Scout Reservation	Gulf Coast Council	DeFuniak Springs, Florida	Active	Opened in 1961, the Spanish Trail Scout Reservation included the Yustaga Lodge. Includes the primary camp, Camp Euchee.
Tanah Keeta Scout Reservation	Gulf Stream Council	Tequesta, FL	Active	In 1953, the Florida Park Service gave 640 acres from Jonathan Dickinson State Park to the Boy Scouts. The reservation includes Camp Loxahatchee (opened 1955), Camp Clear Lake (1957), and the Mike Machek Trail (1988).
Wallwood Boy Scout Reservation				Camp is 25 miles west of Tallahassee.
Winn-Dixie Scout Reservation	Central Florida Council		Active	Temporary name of camp near Paisley, FL, now Leonard and Marjorie Williams Family Scout Reservation

=== Georgia ===
Camp Name	Council	Location	Status	Notes
Bert Adams Scout Reservation	Atlanta Area Council	Covington, GA	Active	
Black Creek Scout Reservation	Coastal Georgia Council	Sylvania, GA	Active	
Camp Allatoona Aquatics Base	Atlanta Area Council	Woodstock, GA	Active	Situated on Lake Allatoona; leased from the Army Corps of Engineers.
Camp Benjamin Hawkins	Central Georgia Council	Byron, GA	Sold	
Camp Blue Heron	Coastal Empire Council	Riceboro, GA	Sold	Sold to Hampton Island Preserve for $8 million in 2008.
Camp Frank J. Lumpkin	Chattahoochee Council	LaGrange, GA	Active	Part of the Chattahoochee Council Scout Reservation. Situated on West Point Lake, the camp is 600 acres with 26 miles of lake shore.
Camp James G. Gallant	Chattahoochee Council	LaGrange, GA	Active	Dedicated in April 1983. Part of the Chattahoochee Council Scout Reservation. It consists of over 300 acres with 28 campsites.
Robert E. Knox Scout Reservation	Georgia-Carolina Council	Lincolnton, Ga	Active	Has over 500 acres with 7 miles of shoreline.
Camp Linwood Hayne	Georgia-Carolina Council	Augusta, GA	Closed	The first of two Linwood Hayne Scout camps in Augusta was in an area surrounded by what is now Boy Scout Road. It opened for its first season in the summer of 1926, and remained there for 20 years before the campground was sold in the mid-1940s and moved to a site 12 miles south of Augusta on Georgia Highway 56. The camp was closed in late 2005 and replaced by Robert E. Knox Scout Reservation.
Camp Pine Mountain	Chattahoochee Council	West Point, GA	Active	First opened in the 1923; one of the oldest continually used Scout camps in the country.
Chase S. Osborn Scout Reservation	South Georgia Council	Sylvester, GA	Active	Also known as Camp Osborn.
Camp Patten	South Georgia Council	Lakeland, GA	Active	
Scoutland	Northeast Georgia Council (NEGA)	Gainesville, GA	Active	Situated on Lake Lanier. It offers primitive camping with 50 campsites; restrooms with showers and electricity; a C.O.P.E. course, an open field for games; three program shelters; a swimming dock; two boat docks; a wide assortment of boats: motor, sailing, canoeing, and rowing; a BB gun/air rifle range; and Cleveland Hall for activities and meals.
Camp Rainey Mountain	Northeast Georgia Council (NEGA)	Clayton, GA	Active	Located near Clayton, Georgia, Camp Rainey Mountain's High Adventure Outpost offers 10 campsites featuring adirondack shelters, 12 campsites featuring tent platforms, four centrally located hot showers, a family camping area, three townhouse cabins, an 1800s style pioneer village, two waterfront areas, a rifle and shotgun range, an archery range, an air-conditioned dining hall, two chapels, 11 program shelters, a climbing and rappelling tower, and a C.O.P.E. course. There are miles of mountain trails, including the Bartram Trail in the Chattahoochee National Forest, and the camp is only 30 minutes from Appalachian Trail access.
Camp Rotary	Northeast Georgia Council (NEGA)	Hartwell, GA	Active	Located in Hartwell, Georgia on Lake Hartwell. Offers primitive camping with 15 campsites, restrooms with shower and electricity, a swimming dock and a council ring for campfires.
Camp Sidney Dew	Northwest Georgia Council	Armuchee, GA	Active	Located on 600 acres, Camp Sidney Dew was founded in 1939 and is located in a valley between John's Mountain and Horn Mountain, with the Chattahoochee National Forest to the north and John's Creek to the south.
Camp Strachan	Coastal Empire Council	Chathan County, GA	Sold	Sold to developers.
Camp Thunder	Flint River Council	Molena, GA	Active	Part of the Gerald I. Lawhorn Scouting Base
Camp Tolochee	Coastal Georgia Council	Brunswick, GA	Active	
Gerald I. Lawhorn Scouting Base	Flint River Council	Molena, GA	Active	Its primary camp is specifically Camp Thunder.
Woodruff Scout Camp	Atlanta Area Council	Blairsville, GA	Active	

=== Hawaii ===
Camp name	Council	Location	Status	Notes
Camp Maluhia	Aloha Council	Wailuku	Active	Located on 212 acres on the windward slopes of West Maui, 15 minutes from Wailuku, HI.
Camp Pupukea	Aloha Council	Pupukea	Active	Located on Oahu, a 65-acre camp 3 miles above Sunset Beach on Pupukea Road and roughly situated an hour's drive from downtown Honolulu and Waikiki.

=== Idaho ===
Camp name	Council	Location	Status	Notes
Bartlett Scout Reservation	Trapper Trails Council	Ovid, Idaho	Active	
Camp Aspen Ridge	Trapper Trails Council	Near Preston, Idaho.	Active	
Camp Bartlett	Trapper Trails Council	Southeastern Idaho	Active	Located 4 miles from Cache National Forest.
Camp Bradley	Snake River Council	Near Stanley, Idaho.	Active	
Camp Easton	Inland Northwest Council	Between Coeur d'Alene and Harrison, Idaho.	Active	
Camp Grizzly	Inland Northwest Council	Near Harvard, Idaho.	Active	
Camp Little Lemhi	Grand Teton Council	Near Palisades Reservoir, Idaho	Active	
Camp Morrison	Ore-Ida Council	Near McCall, Idaho.	Active	
Camp Pineview	Teton Peaks Council	Island Park, Idaho	Inactive	Operated from 1926 to 1927.
Camp Ram's Head	Teton Peaks Council	near Arco, Idaho, held in late 1950s	Inactive	
Hull Valley Scout Reservation	Trapper Trails Council	Preston, Idaho	Active	
Island Park Scout Camp	Grand Teton Council	Near Island Park, Idaho.	Active	
North Idaho HA Base	Inland Northwest Council	North Fork, Idaho	Active	
Salmon River HA Base	Grand Teton Council	Northeast of Salmon, Idaho	Active	
Treasure Mountain	Grand Teton Council	East of Driggs Idaho, barely over border of Western Wyoming	Active	

=== Illinois ===
Camp name	Council	Location	Status	Notes
Camp Big Timber	Three Fires Council	Elgin, IL	Active	
Camp Bunn	Abraham Lincoln Council	Hettick, IL	Active	
Camp Cherokee Hills	Prairielands Council	Georgetown, IL	Sold	The land was sold to the State of Illinois in 1996.
Camp Dan Beard	Northeast Illinois Council	Northbrook, IL	Transferred	Now under the jurisdiction of the Forest Preserve District of Cook County.
Camp Eastman	Mississippi Valley Council	Quincy, IL	Active	Located near Nauvoo, IL.
Camp Heffernan	Corn Belt Council	Normal, IL	Sold	Now known as the Timber Pointe Outdoor Center.
Camp Illinek	Abraham Lincoln Council	Chatham, IL	Active	
Camp Joy	Greater St. Louis Area Council	Carlyle, IL	Closed	No longer active - 2021
Camp Ki Shau Wau	W.D. Boyce Council	Carlyle, IL	Sold	Sold in 1986.
Camp Lakota	Pathway to Adventure Council (Northwest Suburban Council)	Woodstock, IL	Sold	Sold in 2021.
Camp Lowden	Blackhawk Area Council	Oregon, IL	Active	
Camp Mansur	Moline Area Council	Between Carbon Cliff, IL and Silvis, IL	Sold	
Camp Na-Se-Us-Kuk	Fort Armstrong Area Council	Illinois City, IL	Active	Camp changed name to Loud Thunder, currently used by Illowa Council.
Camp Pearl		Tennessee, IL		
Camp Robert Drake	Prairielands Council	Fairmount, IL	Active	
Camp Robert Faries		Decatur, IL		Lincoln Trails, can find patches with 1979 paper
Camp Sauk Trails	Great Sauk Trail Council	Frankfort, IL	Active	Camp Manitoqua is off of Sauk Trail Road.
Camp Saukenauk	Mississippi Valley Council	Mendon	Active	
Camp Tawasentha		Viola, IL		
Camp Vandeventer	Greater St. Louis Area Council	Waterloo, IL	Closed	Archived April 5, 2018, at the Wayback Machine
Camp Warren Levis	Greater St. Louis Area Council	Godfrey, IL	Active	
Camp Wokanda	W.D. Boyce Area Council	Peoria, IL	Closed	Closed in the 1990s; now operated by the City of Peoria, IL.
Canyon Camp	Blackhawk Area Council	Stockton, IL	Active	Located near historic Galena, IL
Corn Belt Council Boy Scout Reservation				
Fellheimer Scout Reservation	Prairie Council	Gilson IL	Sold	Owned by a Seventh-day Adventist group; renamed Camp Akita. ref
Fort Dearborn Scout Camp		Park Ridge, IL	Closed	Part of forest preserve
H. Earl Hoover Scout Reservation	Chicago Area Council (Historic) - Pathway to Adventure Council	Yorkville, IL	Sold To Kendall County Forest Preserve District - Hoover Forest Preserve	Was Chicago's Main Summer Camp Located in Yorkville Illinois Yorkville Scout Camp
Ingersoll Scout Reservation	W. D. Boyce Council	London Mills, IL	Active	
Loud Thunder Scout Reservation	Illowa Council	Illinois City, IL	Active	
Camp Pakentuck	Egyptian Council	Ozark, IL	Closed	Egyptian Council built Pine Ridge Scout Reservation in 1953 and Pakentuck was transferred to Four Rivers Council. It was later sold and became Camp Ondessonk Catholic Camp.
Pine Ridge Scout Camp	Greater St. Louis Area Council	Makanda	Active	Build as a summer camp for the Egyptian Council #120 in 1953–54. Pine Ridge ceased being a summer resident camp in 1994 and was merged with the Greater St. Louis Area Council #312. Pine Ridge continues to be utilized as for camporees, cub activities, training, and unit camping.
Rainbow Council Scout Reservation	Rainbow Council	Morris, IL	Active	
Camp Theakiki	Rainbow Council	St. Anne, IL	Sold	Sold 2023
Rhodes-France Scout Reservation	Greater St. Louis Area Council	Pana	Active	Merged into Greater St. Louis Area Council from Lincoln Trails Council
Scout Ranch	Three Fires Council	Rochelle, IL	Sold	Owned by Three Fires, it became a partnership with Pathways to Adventure council and renamed as Scout Adventure Camp with more of a Cub Scout focus. It was subsequently sold in 2018
Tomo Chi-Chi Knolls	Formerly West Suburban Council	Gilberts, IL	Sold	Sold to Kane County Forest Preserve District in 2006.

=== Indiana ===
Camp name	Council	Location	Status	Notes
Big Island Camp				
Camp Louis Ernst	Hoosier Trails Council	Dupont, IN	Active	Primitive camping only
Camp Arthur				
Camp Bear Creek	Crossroads of America Council	Connersville, IN	Closed	Camp Bear Creek served scouts from the Crossroads of America Council and (previously Whitewater Valley Council) from the 1940s until 2020. It is now owned by the Church of Jesus Christ of Latter-day Saints.
Camp Belzer	Crossroads of America Council	Indianapolis, IN	Active	Built in 2022, the Lange Innovation Center offers numerous activities. Crossroads of America Facilities offers indoor rental spaces and camping.
Camp Bradford				
Camp Buffalo	Sagamore Council	Monticello, IN	Active	
Camp Carnes				
Camp Chief Little Turtle	Anthony Wayne Area Council	Ashley, IN	Active	1,200 acre site on the Pigeon River including multiple lakes
Camp Currie	White River Area Council	Doans, IN (Martin County)	Closed	Camp closed to construct Naval Surface Warfare Center Crane Division
Camp Kikthawenund	Crossroads of America Council	Frankton, IN	Active	Crossroads of America Facilities rentals
Camp Krietenstein	Crossroads of America Council	Center Point, IN	Active	Crossroads of America Facilities rentals
Camp Pioneer Trails				
Camp Pohoka				
Camp Red Wing	Crossroads of America Council	Muncie, IN	Closed	Located on the southeast side of Muncie on the White River, the former Camp Red Wing was serving campers since 1925. This camp had been donated to the Boy Scouts of America and continued in their care until 2020 when it was purchased by Fortis Ventures. - From Camp Red Wing Historical Association. As of Sept 2022, it is privately owned by a family and goes by The Landing at Redwing.
Camp Tepicon				
Camp Topenebee	LaSalle Council	Michigan City, IN	Active	
Camp Wapehani	White River Trails Council (Now Hoosier Trails)	Bloomington, IN	Closed	Sold in the early 1950s. Property is currently used as a mountain bike park by the City of Bloomington department of Parks and Recreation
Camp Wildwood	Crossroads of America Council	Terre Haute, Indiana	Active	
Camp Wright	East Chicago Council	Michigan City Indiana	Closed	Near site of Purdue North Central
Cary Camp	Sagamore Council	Lafayette, IN	Active	
Crossland Scout Reservation	Sagamore Council	Pierceton, IN	Closed	Camp was sold to state in the 1990s. Now a state recreation area
Maumee Scout Reservation	Hoosier Trails Council	Norman, Indiana	Active	
Mid-America Council Camps				
Old Ben Scout Reservation	Buffalo Trace Council	Winslow, Indiana	Closed	Sold to private operator.
Portland Arch	Formerly Piankeshaw Council	Fountain, IN	Closed	Now a nature preserve.
Ransburg Scout Reservation	Crossroads of America Council	Bloomington, Indiana	Active	Located on beautiful Lake Monroe, Ransburg is the premier Scout camp in the midwest. They have 624 acres surrounded by the Hoosier National Forest. Ransburg offers over 72 merit badges and a host of other activities and trainings. From taking merit badges using one of three ski-boats, exploring the personal watercraft and ATV programs, taking a trail ride at the on-site ranch, zipping down the zip-line or climbing a tower, to building robots and welding, learning time tested scouting skills, or becoming a better version of yourself by living the Scout Oath and Law for a week, Ransburg has it all! https://www.ransburgbsa.org/
Self Reliant Camp				
Southern Indiana Council Camps				
Tunnel Mill Scout Reservation	Lincoln Heritage Council	Charlestown, Indiana	Active	Established in 1927. Primarily used for Cub Scout Day/Resident Camps and District Events.
Wilderness Camp				
Woodlake Scout Reservation	LaSalle Council	Jones, MI	Active	

=== Iowa ===
Camp name	Council	Location	Status	Notes
Camp C.S. Klaus	Northeast Iowa Council	Near Colesburg, IA	Active	Situated within a 200-acre wooded valley.
Camp Iten	Mesquakie Area Council	Northwest of Maquoketa, IA	Sold	Now a public park in Jackson County, Iowa.
Camp Minneyata	Buffalo Bill Area Council	Near Dixon, IA	Sold	Now a public Park in Scott County, Iowa.
Camp Mitigwa (Mitigwa Scout Reservation)	Mid-Iowa Area Council	Northeast of Woodward, Iowa	Active	450 acres located north of Des Moines.
Camp Osawan	Prairie Gold Area Council		Sold	
Camp Roosevelt	Winnebago_Council	Northwood, Iowa	Sold	
Camp Wakonda	Southwest Iowa Council	Northwest of Griswold, IA	Sold	260 acres; now serves as the Creighton University Retreat Center. Operated from 1948 to 1978.
Camp Wapello	Formerly Bo-Qui Council	Drakesville, IA	Sold	Now privately owned; sits on Lake Wapello.
Howard H. Cherry Scout Reservation	Hawkeye Area Council	Central City, IA	Active	
Ingawanis Adventure Base	Winnebago Council	Waverly, IA	Active	
Prairie Gold Scout Reservation	Prairie Gold Area Council	Lake Okoboji, IA	Inactive	

=== Kansas ===
Camp name	Council	Location	Status	Notes
Brown Memorial Camp	Coronado Area Council	Abilene, KS	Active	Has been operating since the 1930s; renovated in 2015.
Camp Kanza	Quivira Council	Abbyville, KS	Sold	Primarily used for Cub Scout activities.
Mandan Scout Camp & Training Center	Santa Fe Trail Council	Wright, Kansas	Active	Primarily used for Cub Scout activities and training
Camp Pawnee	Santa Fe Trail Council	Larned, KS	Closed	The land has been donated to Pawnee County, Kansas.
Camp Tawakoni	Quivira Council	Augusta, KS	Sold	The land was sold to a Christian group for $850,000 in 2004.
Camp Theodore Naish	Heart of America Council	Bonner Springs, KS	Active	
Dane G. Hansen Scout Reservation	Coronado Area Council	Kirwin, KS	Active	Also known as Camp Hansen.
Falley Scout Reservation	Jayhawk Area Council	Oskaloosa, KS	Active	Available to both boy and girl units.
Quivira Scout Ranch	Quivira Council	Sedan, KS	Active	

=== Kentucky ===
Camp name	Council	Location	Status	Notes
Camp Cherokee	Tri-State Area Council	Louisa, KY		
Camp Michaels (Kentucky)	Dan Beard Council	3486 Hathaway Rd, Union, KY		
Camp Covered Bridge	Formerly Old Kentucky Home Council	Oldham County, KY	Closed	Land has been developed into housing.
Camp Crooked Creek	Lincoln Heritage Council	Shepherdsville, KY	Active	Also known as the Harry S. Frazier, Jr. Scout Reservation.
Mammoth Cave Council Camp				
McKee Scout Reservation	Blue Grass Council	Jeffersonville, KY	Active	Located within Daniel Boone National Forest.
Pfeffer Scout Reservation	Lincoln Heritage Council	Benton, KY	Active	
Wildcat Hollow Scout Camp	Lincoln Heritage Council	Russelville, Ky	Closed	Property Sold

=== Louisiana ===
Camp name	Council	Location	Status	Notes
Avondale Scout Reservation	Istrouma Area Council	Clinton, LA	Active	Opened in 1959; 1,665 acres.
Camp Attakapas	Louisiana Purchase Council	Trout, LA	Active	
Camp Britton	Ouachita Valley Council		Closed	Operated as a Scout camp for African-Americans in the days of segregation; closed sometime between 1957 and 1967.
Camp Carruth	Istrouma Area Council	Port Allen, LA	Active	Opened the late 1990s.
Camp Carver	Istrouma Area Council		Closed	Operated as a Scout camp for African-Americans in the days of segregation; closed sometime between 1957 and 1967.
Camp Chenier	Evangeline Area Council		Closed	Operated as a Scout camp for African-Americans in the days of segregation; closed sometime between 1957 and 1967.
Camp Edgewood	Calcasieu Area Council	Dequincy, LA	Active	
Camp Pioneer	Norwela Council		Closed	Operated as a Scout camp for African-Americans in the days of segregation; closed sometime between 1957 and 1967.
Camp Salmen	New Orleans Area Council	Slidell, LA	Closed	Operated as a Scout camp on Bayou Liberty between 1924 and 1983 on 106 acres.
Camp T.L. James	Louisiana Purchase Council	Downsville, LA	Active	
Camp Thistlethwaite	Evangeline Area Council	Washington, LA		
Camp Yatasi	Norwela Council	Webster Parish, LA	Closed	
Indian Village Scout Camp	New Orleans Area Council		Closed	Operated as a Scout camp for African-Americans in the days of segregation; closed sometime between 1957 and 1967.
Kinsey Scout Reservation	Norwela Council	Stonewall, LA	Active	Formerly known as Garland Scout Ranch
Louisiana Swamp Base	Evangeline Area Council	Henderson, LA	Active	Offers high adventure canoeing treks through the 1.4 million acre Atchafalaya Swamp in South Central Louisiana.
Lost Bayou Scout Camp	Evangeline Area Council	Saint Landry, LA	Active	

=== Maine ===
Camp name	Council	Location	Status	Notes
Camp Bomazeen	Pine Tree Council	Belgrade, ME	Active	
Camp Gustin	Pine Tree Council	Sabattus, ME	Active	Situated on Loon Pond. Sold to Androscoggin Land Trust in 2022, sites available for Scout camping.
Camp Nutter	Pine Tree Council	Acton, ME	Active	Situated on Loon Pond. Sold in 2021 and run as non-Scout Camp Kita, but still available for use by Scouts.
Camp William Hinds	Pine Tree Council	Raymond, ME	Active	Located on 230 acres on Panther Pond.
Katahdin Scout Reservation	Katahdin Area Council	Eddington, ME	Active	The reservation includes Camp Roosevelt and has been in operation since 1921. The camp has over 1800 acres at the base of Black Cap Mountain.
Maine High Adventure	Katahdin Area Council	Patten, ME	Active	The area encompasses nearly 3 million acres, including Mt. Katahdin, the Allagash Wilderness Waterway, the Penobscot watershed, the St. Croix International Waterway, and the northernmost 100 miles of the Appalachian Trail.
Norshoco Scout Reservation	North Shore Council	Lyman, ME	Closed	Closed in 1972. Located on Bunganut Lake. Location is now a public town park.

=== Maryland ===
Camp name	Council	Location	Acres	Status	Notes
Broad Creek Memorial Scout Reservation	Baltimore Area Council	Whiteford, Maryland	1900	Active	Located in Harford County, Maryland, Broad Creek was opened in 1948 and has over 1,900 acres of land. Broad Creek has three primary camps and two secondary camps: Camp Saffran; Camp Camp Spencer (Leased to YMCA); Camp Oest; and: Houck Lodge; Camp Finney
Deep Run	Baltimore Area Council				
Henson Scout Reservation	Del-Mar-Va Council	Galestown, Maryland	1500	Active	Also known as Camp Nanticoke, a 1,500-acre located on the Delmarva Peninsula.
Horseshoe Scout Reservation	Chester County Council			Active	Located on the Mason–Dixon line separating Pennsylvania and Maryland. It is divided into two camps: Camp Horseshoe, in Rising Sun, Maryland, and Camp John H. Ware, III, in Fulton Township, Lancaster County, Pennsylvania.
Lillie-Aaron Straus Explorer Base	Baltimore Area Council				
Rodney Scout Reservation	Del-Mar-Va Council	North East, Cecil County, Maryland	900	Active	900 acres located at the head of the Chesapeake Bay. It has been in continuous operation since 1923.

=== Massachusetts ===
Camp name	Council	Location	Status	Notes
Adams Pond Scout Reservation	Boston Council	Barnstead, NH	Merged	Now T.L. Storer Scout Reservation
Camp Buxton	Narragansett Council	Rehoboth, MA	Inactive	As of 2022, leased for solar energy development.
Cachalot Scout Reservation	Narragansett Council	Plymouth, MA	Closed	Sold June 17, 2022, to become part of Myles Standish State Forest.
Camp Child	Old Colony Council	Plymouth, MA	Closed	
Camp Collier	Nashua Valley Council	Gardner, MA	Active	Camp is now in the ownership of a trust. The land is still available for use by Scouts.
Camp Fellsland	Minuteman Council	Amesbury, MA	Closed	
Camp Greenough	Cape Cod and The Islands Council		Active	
Camp Massasoit	Boston Minuteman Council	Plymouth, MA	Closed	The camp closed in 2015. Much of the land has been sold to outside developers.
Camp Mohican				
Camp Norse	Narragansett Council	Kingston, MA	Active	
Camp Resolute	Mayflower Council	Bolton, MA	Active	Part of E. Paul Robsham, Jr. Scout Reservation, (commonly known as just Camp Resolute,) which also includes Adventure Day Camp.
Camp Sachem	Minuteman Council	Antrim, NH	Closed	
Camp Sagamore				
Camp Split Rock	Heart of New England Council	Ashburnham, MA	Active	Opened in 1945. Started as a Boy Scout resident camp for the Fitchburg Area Council, owned by a Trust with reservations for Scout camping and activities through the Heart of New England Council.
Camp Squanto	Mayflower Council	Plymouth, MA	Active	Located in the Myles Standish State Forest near Plymouth, Massachusetts.
Camp Ted				
Chesterfield Scout Reservation	Western Massachusetts Council	Chesterfield, MA	Closed	
Horace A. Moses Scout Reservation	Western Massachusetts Council	Russell, MA	Active	Active, 1947–present. Located on Russell Pond. Formerly composed of Camp Woronoak, Camp (Henry) Knox and Camp Frontier (patrol method camping).
New England Base Camp	Spirit of Adventure Council	Milton, MA	Active	Formerly Camp Sayre. Open to the public.
Nobscot Scout Reservation	Mayflower Council	Framingham, MA	Active	
Treasure Valley Scout Reservation	Mohegan Council	Rutland, MA	Active	Main entrance is on the Rutland/Paxton line. Part is also in Oakham.
Wild Goose Camp	Boston Council	Barnstead, NH	Merged	Now T.L. Storer Scout Reservation
T.L. Storer Scout Reservation	Spirit of Adventure Council	Barnstead, NH	Active	Host of various district & council events and training. Available for Scout weekend camping.
Parker Mountain Scout Camp	Spirit of Adventure Council	Strafford, NH	Active	Leased to the Beam Center in NYC during summer for a non-scouting related camp.
Camp Wah-Tut-Ca	Spirit of Adventure Council	Northwood, NH	Active	Property is leased (2022–2027) to another organization which runs summer camp programs. Available for Scout weekend camping throughout the fall, winter, and spring.

=== Michigan ===
Camp name	Council	Location	Status	Notes
Bear Lake Scout Camp	Summer Trails Council (Michigan Crossroads Council)	Kalkaska	Closed	Sold in 1985
Bruin Lake Camp	Portage Trails Council (Michigan Crossroads Council)	Gregory	Closed	Renamed Camp Munhacke and closed in 2019.
Camp Agawam	Clinton Valley Council (Michigan Crossroads Council)	Lake Orion	Closed	Run by local parks
George N Brady Scout Reservation (Camp Brady)	Detroit Area Council (Michigan Crossroads Council)	Waterford	Closed	Operated from 1921 to 1946. Sold in 1946, the site is now occupied by Bay Court Park in Independence Charter Township.
Camp Frank S. Betz	Calumet Council (Pathway to Adventure Council)	Berrien Springs	Active	
Camp Greilick	Scenic Trails Council (Michigan Crossroads Council)	Traverse City	Closed	Reverted to Rotary Foundation of Traverse City
Camp Haley	Summer Trails Council (Michigan Crossroads Council)	Selkirk	Closed	Sold in 1947. Was on Henderson Lake near Lupton, Michigan. It is now the Camp Lu Lay Lea Lutheran summer camp.
Camp Hiawatha	Bay-Lakes Council	Munising	Active	
Camp Highland				
Camp Holaka	Tall Pine Council (Michigan Crossroads Council)	Lapeer	Closed	Located on 340 acres in Lapeer County. Camp Holaka was sold 2018.
Camp Kanesatake	Wolverine Council (Michigan Crossroads Council)	Cambridge Township	Closed	The camp was located on Washington Lake. It was sold in the early 1980s.
Camp Kiroliex	Chief Okemos Council (Michigan Crossroads Council)	Waterloo Township	Closed	The camp was located on Clear Lake in Waterloo Township, Michigan.
Camp Kiwanis	Chief Okemos Council (Michigan Crossroads Council)	Mason	Closed	85 acres located 3.5 miles east of Mason, Michigan on M-36 at Diamond Road.
Camp Madron	Southwest Michigan Council (Michigan Crossroads Council)	Buchanan	Closed	Was located on Madron Lake and sold in 1985.
Camp Mills	Detroit Area Council (Michigan Crossroads Council)	Rose City	Closed	Mills operated from 1937 to 1931. Located on Bullhead Lake near Rose City. Bullhead Lake was later renamed to Echo Lake. The site still operates as a Greek Orthodox Summer Camp.
Camp Munhacke	Portage Trails Council (Michigan Crossroads Council)	Gregory	Closed	Michigan Crossroads council announced in October, 2019, the camp will be closed in January, 2020.
Camp Neyati	Summer Trails Council (Michigan Crossroads Council)	Lake, Michigan	Closed	Closed in 1962, and is now owned and operated by Midland Community Foundation.
Camp Northwinds	Southwest Michigan Council (Michigan Crossroads Council)	Eden Township	Closed	1,280 camp located in Mason County. Sold in 1991.
Camp Pine Lake	Tall Pine Council (Michigan Crossroads Council)	Linden	Closed	
Camp Rotary	Valley Trails Council (Michigan Crossroads Council)	Clare	Active	The campground is owned by the Saginaw Rotary Club, but leased by the Boy Scouts. Camp Rotary offers 1,180 acres of year around camping just north of Clare, MI, on old US-27.
Camp Shawondosee	Grand Valley Council (Michigan Crossroads Council))	Whitehall	Closed	Originally located near West Olive (Port Sheldon) on Lake Michigan (1916–1927) it re-located to Duck Lake, near Whitehall, Michigan, in 1927 the property was acquired by the Nature Conservancy in the early 1970s and is now part of Duck Lake State Park. Gerald R. Ford was a camp staff member there in 1927–28.
Camp Silver Lake	Detroit Area Council (Michigan Crossroads Council))	Indian River	Closed	
Camp T. Ben Johnston	Southwest Michigan Council (Michigan Crossroads Council)	Augusta	Closed	Closed in the 1980s and reverted to the W. K. Kellogg Foundation. It now operates as Sherman Lake YMCA camp.
Camp Tapico	Tall Pine Council (Michigan Crossroads Council)	Kalkaska	Closed	Camp Tapico is located in the eastern region of Kalkaska County just north of M-72 between Grayling and Traverse City. Sold and closed.
Camp Teetonkah	Land O' Lakes Council (Michigan Crossroads Council)	Jackson	Active	Established in 1912.
Camp Wabaningo	Evanston North Shore Area Council (Northeast Illinois Council)	Whitehall	Closed	Closed and sold after the Evanston Council and Northshore Area Council merged in 1969.
Camp Weidman	Water and Woods Field Service Council		Active	Located four miles west of Mt. Pleasant, just off M-20.
Camp Wilderness		Bridgman	Closed	Land was purchased by Rotary Club of Oak Park–River Forest (IL) and donated to their local Scout council in the 1920s. In 1945 it was sold to the State of Michigan and became part of Warren Dunes State Park.
Charles Howell Scout Reservation	Detroit Area Council (Michigan Crossroads Council)	Brighton	Closed	Located on Brighton Lake. Sold in 1986. The site is now occupied by a residential community.
Cole Canoe Base	Detroit Area Council (Michigan Crossroads Council)	Alger	Active	Originally named the Rifle River Canoe Base.
D-Bar-A Scout Ranch	Detroit Area Council (Michigan Crossroads Council)	Metamora	Active	
Gerber Scout Reservation	West Michigan Shores Council (Michigan Crossroads Council)	Twin Lake	Active	
Lost Lake Scout Reservation	Clinton Valley Council (Michigan Crossroads Council)	Lake	Closed	Closed in 2012.
Northwinds Scout Reservation	Fruit Belt Area Council (Michigan Crossroads Council)	Located in Michigan's northern Lower Peninsula.	Closed	Bought by the former Fruit Belt Area Council; operated in the late 1960s and early 1970s.
Northwoods Scout Reservation	Chief Okemos Council (Michigan Crossroads Council)	Lupton	Closed	840 acres located near West Branch in Ogemaw County, Michigan.
Owasippe Scout Reservation	Chicago Area Council (Pathway to Adventure Council)	Twin Lake	Active	4,800 acres located near Twin Lake, Michigan. Oldest Boy Scout Camp in continuous operation. Since 1911.
Paul Bunyan Scout Reservation	Paul Bunyan Council; Lake Huron Area Council (Michigan Crossroads Council)	Rose City	Closed	Located on 600 acres bordering the Huron National Forest, with water activities on the AuSable River, just north of Rose City on M-33. Paul Bunyan Scout Reservation was closed for the 2013 camping year.
Prevailing Winds II				
Rota-Kiwan Scout Reservation	Fruit Belt Area Council (Michigan Crossroads Council)	Kalamazoo	Closed	199 acres located in Texas Township southwest of Kalamazoo. The camp also bordered the 741-acre Al Sabo Preserve, which provides numerous hiking trails. The Boy Scout resident camp was Camp Madron and the Cub Scout resident camp was Camp T. Ben Johnston. Both were named after former camps of the Southwest Michigan Council that were sold in the 1980s. Council announced in October, 2019, that the camp would close in January, 2020. It was bought by Kalamazoo county for park, land preserve.
Silver Trails Scout Reservation	Blue Water Council (Michigan Crossroads Council)	Jeddo	Closed	Located near Jeddo, Michigan, south of Croswell, and about 15 miles (24 km) northwest of Port Huron.
Wood Lake Scout Reservation	La Salle Council	Jones	Active	Camp Tamarack is located at Wood Lake Scout Reservation.
Wrights Lake Scout Camp	Wolverine Council (Michigan Crossroads Council)	Evart	Closed	Closed in 1995
Camp Tsaragi	Detroit Area Council (Michigan Crossroads Council)	Sugar Island	Closed	Operated from 1922 to 1926
Camp Kabekonah	Detroit Area Council (Michigan Crossroads Council)	Alpena	Closed	Operated from 1927 to 1946. Camp Kabekohnah was located on Lake Huron near Alpena.
Moose Peterson Wilderness Scout Base	Detroit Area Council (Michigan Crossroads Council)	Vanderbilt	Closed	Operated from 1976 to 1982.
Camp Muscootah	Land O' Lakes Council (Michigan Crossroads Council)	Hillsdale	Closed	
Camp Newkirk	Portage Trails Council (Michigan Crossroads Council)	Dexter	Closed	The camp operated in the 1930s, 40s and 50s. The site is currently occupied by the Dexter United Methodist Church.

=== Minnesota ===
Camp name	Council	Location	Status	Notes
Base Camp	Northern Star Council	St Paul, MN	Active	Located in the century-old Cavalry Drill Hall near Fort Snelling, Minnesota.
Camp Clyde				Renamed to Parker Scout Reservation
Camp Hoksila			Sold	Operates as a Municipal Park and Campground, City acquired it in 1974.
Camp Wabaunaquat	Formerly Lake Agassiz Council	Near Ogema, MN	Inactive	Operated from 1940 to 1980; located near the White Earth Indian Reservation.
Camp Wichingen	Formerly Headwaters Area Council	Island Lake Boy Scout Dr Hibbing, MN 55746 United States	Sold	It was Located south of Hibbing, Minnesota on Island Lake. The road is still named Boy Scout Drive.
Camp Wilderness	Northern Lights Council	Park Rapids, MN	Active	The 2,400-acre "Outdoor Classroom" is situated between beautiful Bad Axe and Mantrap Lake near Park Rapids, MN in Hubbard County.
Cannon River Scout Reservation				Renamed Phillippo Scout Reservation
Charles L. Sommers Canoe Base	National BSA Council	Near Ely, MN	Active	One of the three bases operated by Northern Tier High Adventure programs that offers canoe treks in the boundary waters of Northern Minnesota, southwest Ontario, and southeast Manitoba.
Crow Wing Scout Reservation				
Cuyuna Scout Camp	Twin Valley Council	Cross Lake, MN	Active	Cuyuna Scout Camp is located in a heavily wooded area approximately 30 miles north of Brainerd, MN and 4 miles north of Crosslake, MN on HWY 3. The camp is 684 acres and borders on six lakes.
Kiwanis Scout Reservation	Northern Star Council	Marine on St. Croix, MN	Active	110 acres located on the banks of the St. Croix River near St. Croix. This was a youth camp starting in 1925, and became a Scout camp in 1989.
Many Point Scout Camp	Northern Star Area Council	Near Ponsford, MN	Active	2,400 acres located in Ponsford, Minnesota. It has been operating for over 60 years.
Norseland Scout Reservation	Twin Valley Council	St Peter, MN	Active	
Parker Scout Reservation	Central Minnesota Council	Near Nisswa, MN	Active	Established in 1941 by Clyde Parker, Camp Parker (formerly known as Camp Clyde) sits on 256 wooded acres just north of Brainerd on North Long Lake at 21930 Paradise Drive in Nisswa, MN 56468 in Crow Wing County. Camp Parker is available year-round for use by Scout groups and non-Scout youth groups. Featuring a medieval castle, dining lodge, several camp sites and cabins, a family camp, trading post, shower house, sandy beach, gun and archery ranges, and much more!
Phillippo Scout Reservation	Northern Star Area Council	Near Cannon Falls, MN	Active	Renamed in 2000, Phillippo Scout Reservation was originally called the Cannon River Scout Reservation. Located on 450 acres near Cannon Falls, Minnesota, it opened in 1964.
Rum River Scout Camp	Northern Star Area Council	Near Anoka, MN	Active	Operating since 1957, Rum River Scout Camp is a 167-acre facility on the Rum River located 4 miles north of Anoka, Minnesota.
Stearns Scout Camp	Northern Star Area Council	Near South Haven, MN	Active	1,200 acres located near South Haven, Minnesota.

=== Mississippi ===
Camp name	Council	Location	Status	Notes
Camp Binachi	Choctaw Area Council	Meridian, MS	Active	
Camp Currier	Chickasaw Council	Eudora, MS	Active	
Camp Kickapoo	Andrew Jackson Council	Clinton, MS	Closed	Summer camp closed at the end of the summer of 1986. Replaced by Warren A. Hood Scout Reservation in the summer of 1987.
Camp Palila	Pushmataha Area Council	Louisville, MS	Closed	Replaced Camp Pine Spring; now part of Legion State Park.
Camp Pine Spring	Pushmataha Area Council	Columbus, MS	Closed	Served as the original Pushmataha Area Council camp; situated along the Buttahatchie River in Monroe County, MS.
Camp Seminole	Pushmataha Area Council	Starkville, MS	Active	Replaced Camp Palila.
Camp Tiak	Pine Burr Area Council	Fruitland Park, MS	Active	
Camp Towanda	Pine Burr Area Council	Stone County, MS	Closed	Closed in the 1950s.
Camp Yocona	Yocona Area Council	Randolph, MS	Active	
Salmen Scout Reservation	Southeast Louisiana Council	Perkinston, MS	Active	Also known as Camp V-Bar.
Hood Scout Reservation	Andrew Jackson Council	Hazlehurst, MS	Active	Reservation operated several years as a non-summer camp prior to the closure of Camp Kickapoo.

=== Missouri ===
Camp name	Council	Location	Status	Notes
Beaumont Scout Reservation	Greater St. Louis Area Council	High Ridge, MO	Active	2,400 acres of wooded, rolling hills in southwestern St. Louis County; contains Camp May and Nagel Explorer Base
Camp Arrowhead	Ozark Trails Council	Marshfield, MO	Active	Founded in 1924; the oldest continually operating Boy Scout camp west of the Mississippi River.
Camp Dan Sayre	Heart of America Council	Noel, MO	Closed	Operated between 1922 and 1929.
Camp Famous Eagle	Greater St. Louis Area Council	Knob Lick, MO	Active	One of four camps at S – F Scout Ranch; dining hall-style.
Camp Gamble	Greater St. Louis Area Council	Knob Lick, MO	Active	One of four camps at S – F Scout Ranch, patrol method cooking-style.
Camp Geiger	Pony Express Council	St. Joseph, MO	Active	One of only two Scout camps in the United States to use Mic-O-Say, rather than solely Order of the Arrow as its Scout honor society. It was first camp in the US to offer Project C.O.P.E.
Camp Lewallen	Greater St. Louis Area Council	Silva, MO	Active	Opened in 1936, the camp is 580 acres.
Camp Sakima	Greater St. Louis Area Council	Knob Lick, MO	Active	One of four camps at S – F Scout Ranch, used for NYLT only.
Camp Sunnen	Greater St. Louis Area Council	Potosi, MO	Closed	
Camp Thunderbird	Great Rivers Council	Randolph County, MO	Closed	
Cow Creek Scout Reservation	Ozark Trails Council	Blue Eye, MO	Active	Property was donated to the local Boy Scout and Girl Scout councils with the Girl Scouts later ceding their half to the Ozark Trails Council, BSA.
Frank Childress Scout Reservation	Ozark Trails Council	Diamond, MO	Sold	The property was sold to a non-profit founded by area scouts.
H. Roe Bartle Scout Reservation	Heart of America Area Council	Osceola, Missouri	Active	Located on 4,200 acres.
Irondale Scout Reservation	Greater St. Louis Area Council	Irondale, MO	Closed	Closed in 1965.
Lake of the Ozarks Scout Reservation	Great Rivers Council	Gravois Mills, MO	Active	Originally named "Camp Hohn." Home of the Sinquefield Invention Campus – housing a full wood shop, metal shop, 3d printers, laser cutter and engraver, electronics and programming materials, and much more. Offers jet skiing, motorboating, sailing and watersports.
Pa-He-Tsi Scout Camp	Lake of the Ozarks Council	Kaiser, MO	Closed	
Scudder Explorer Base	Formerly St. Louis Area Council		Closed	
S-F Scout Ranch	Greater St. Louis Area Council	Knob Lick, MO	Active	Also known as the "S Bar F", sits on 5,200 acres with a 270-acre lake.
Swift High Adventure Base	Greater St. Louis Area Council	Knob Lick, MO	Active	One of four camps at S – F Scout Ranch, formerly John S. Swift Explorer Base, Venturing Summer Camp.

=== Montana ===
Camp name	Council	Location	Status	Notes
Camp Arcola	Montana Council	Anaconda, MT	Active	
Camp Melita Island	Montana Council	Lake County, MT	Active	Located on Flatehead Lake. Acquired in 2005 for $1.5 million.
Camp Paxson	Western Montana Council	Seeley Lake, MT	Active	Situated in Lolo National Forest.
K-M Scout Ranch	Montana Council	Hilger, MT	Active	Renovated in 2019.
Grizzly Base Camp	Montana Council	Columbia Falls, MT	Active	

=== Nebraska ===
Camp name	Council	Location	Status	Notes
Camp Augustine	Overland Trails Council	Near Doniphan, NE	Inactive	1945–2024. Camp Augustine was a 160-acre camp along the banks of the Platte River between Grand Island and Doniphan, Nebraska Camp Augustine was purchased by the city of Grand Island in November 2023.
Camp Butterfield	Mid-America Council	Near Orchard, NE	Closed	Camp Butterfield was located 13 miles north of Orchard, Nebraska and composed 160 acres of rolling sandhills
Camp Cedars	Mid-America Council	Near Cedar Bluffs, NE	Active	1939–Present. Camp Cedars comprises the western half of the Covered Wagon Scout Reservation
Camp Cornhusker	Cornhusker Council	Near Du Bois, NE	Active	1956–Present. South of Humboldt, NE
Camp Eagle	Mid-America Council	Near Cedar Bluffs, NE	Active	1963–Present. Camp Eagle comprises the eastern half of the Covered Wagon Scout Reservation
Camp Kitaki				
Camp Opal Springs	Tri-Trails Council (defunct)	Near Wellfleet, NE	Closed	Site was occupied by Dancing Leaf Earth Lodge until 2016
Camp Wa-kon-da	Mid-America Council	Bellevue, NE	Active	Camp Wa-kon-da is in Bellevue, Nebraska and covers 40 acres of wooded bluffs, adjacent to Fontenelle Forest
Little Sioux Scout Ranch	Mid-America Council	Near Little Sioux, IA	Active	1970–Present. Little Sioux Scout Ranch (LSSR) is approximately one hour north of Omaha, Nebraska in Iowa's Loess Hills and covers 1800 acres
Thomas Ashford Scout Reservation	Mid-America Council	Near Homer, NE	Closed	1972–2013. Originally covered over 600 acres

=== Nevada ===
Camp name	Council	Location	Status	Notes
Engelstad Scout Park	Las Vegas Area Council	Las Vegas, NV	Active	
Spencer W. Kimball Scout Reservation	Las Vegas Area Council	Blue Diamond, NV	Sold	Sold in the late 2000s.

=== New Hampshire ===
Camp Name	Council	Location	Status	Notes
Adams Pond Camp	Spirit of Adventure Council	Barnstead, NH	Temporarily Closed	Part of T.L. Storer Scout Reservation.
Camp Bell	Daniel Webster Council	Gilmanton Iron Works, NH	Active	Part of Griswold Scout Reservation
Camp Carpenter	Daniel Webster Council	Manchester, NH	Active	
Camp Manning	Daniel Webster Council	Gilmanton Iron Works, NH	Closed	Opened in 1925 and sold in 1949. Daniel Webster Council repurchased the camp in 1990 and opened it under the name of Camp Bell
Camp Monadnock				
Camp Onway	Yankee Clipper Council		Closed	Open from 1929 to 2007. Onway was sold to the LDS Church and is now known as Zion's Camp.
Camp Quinapoxet			Closed	Open from 1925 to 2003 (closed for a few years in the late 1980s). "Quinny" was sold to the Audubon Society in 2003.
Camp Wanocksett	Heart of New England Council	Dublin, NH	Active	Opened in 1924. Located at the base of Mount Monadnock.
Hidden Valley Scout Camp	Daniel Webster Council	Gilmanton Iron Works, NH	Active	Part of Griswold Scout Reservation. Formerly owned by the Norumbega Council.
Pierre Hoge Scout Camp	Daniel Webster Council	Walpole, NH	Active	
Indian Pond Scout Reservation	Bay Shore/North Bay Council	Piermont, NH	Closed	Open 1962 to 1979. Composed of Camp Weston and Camp Waskeche (patrol method camping).
Lone Tree Scout Reservation	Spirit of Adventure Council	Kingston, NH	Closed	
Mead Wilderness Base	Daniel Webster Council	White Mountain National Forest	Closed	
Parker Mountain Scout Reservation	Spirit of Adventure Council	Barnstead, NH	Active	Leased to the Beam Center in NYC during summer for a non-scouting related camp.
T.L. Storer Scout Reservation	Spirit of Adventure Council	Barnstead, NH	Active	Open for weekend camping, district and council events. Formerly composed of Wild Goose and Adams Pond camps.
Wah-Tut-Ca Scout Reservation	Spirit of Adventure Council	Northwood, NH	Active	
White Mountain High Adventure Base	Daniel Webster Council	White Mountain National Forest	Closed	

=== New Jersey ===
Camp name	Council	Location	Status	Notes
Camp Alpine				
Camp Ames				
Camp Carr				
Camp Cowaw - Case Scout Reservation			Inactive	
Camp Cowaw			Inactive	
Camp Denton				
Camp Glen Gray	Montclair Council	Mahwah, NJ	Closed	The camp is now a Bergen County Park and is independently managed and financially supported by The Friends of Glen Gray, Inc.
Camp Grice	Garden State Council	Alloway, NJ	Closed	
Camp Ken-etiwa-pec				
Camp Kimble				
Camp Lenape/Lenape Scout Reservation	Burlington County Council	Medford, NJ		Sold in 1988. Purchased in 1943 after Camp Mahalala was taken over by the Air Force to build McGuire AFB.
Camp Lewis	Northern New Jersey Council	Rockaway, NJ	Active	
Camp NoBeBoSco	Northern New Jersey Council		Active	Also known as NoBe, it is located in Hardwick Township, New Jersey. It opened in 1927.
Roosevelt Scout Reservation	Garden State Council	Alloway, NJ	Active	The reservation includes Camp Diller.
Camp Sakawawin				
Camp Somers	Patriots' Path Council	Byram, NJ	Active	On the Mt. Allamuchy Scout Reservation.
Camp Tamarack	Bergen Council	Oakland, NJ	Closed	
Camp Todd	Alexander Hamilton Council of Hudson County, NJ.	Oakland, NJ	Closed 1991	near Ramapo Mountain State Forest
Camp Towadena	Alexander Hamilton Council of Hudson County, NJ.	Sandyston, NJ		On Fairview Lake near Camp NoBeBoSco
Camp Twin Echo				
Camp Watchung	Patriots' Path Council		Active	Cub scout day camp at watchung state park
Camp Wheeler	Patriots' Path Council	Byram, NJ	Active	Located on the Mt. Allamuchy Scout Reservation
Camp Winnebago	Patriots' Path Council	Rockaway, NJ	Active	See also Winnebago Scout Reservation
Camp Yaw Paw	Northern New Jersey Council	Mahwah, NJ	Active	
Joseph A. Citta Scout Reservation	Jersey Shore Council	Barnegat, NJ	Active	
Kittatinny Mountain Scout Reservation	Thomas A. Edison Council; Central Jersey Council	Branchville, NJ	Closed as a BSA camp	Now part of Stokes State Forest, camp sites still available through NJ Division of Parks & Forestry
Mt. Allamuchy Scout Reservation	Patriots' Path Council	Byram, NJ	Active	
Ocean County Council Reservation				
Pahaquarra Boy Scout Camp	George Washington Council	Columbia, NJ	Closed	1925 to 1971
Pine Hill Scout Reservation	Garden State Council	Pine Hill, NJ	Active	
Mortimer L. Schiff Scout Reservation	Boy Scouts of America	Mendham, New Jersey	Closed	This was a major Boy Scout training facility for almost 50 years. It was closed in 1979. It was the location of the first Wood Badge courses held in the United States.
Winnebago Scout Reservation	Patriots' Path Council	Rockaway, NJ	Active	Richard Mager served for 60 years on the Summer camp staff mostly as the Aquatics Director (1968–2012, 2018–19).
Yards Creek Scout Reservation	Central Jersey Council		Closed	

=== New Mexico ===
Camp name	Council	Location	Status	Notes
Black Range Cavalcade	Yucca Council	Winston, NM		
Camp Dale Resler	Yucca Council	Cloudcroft, NM	Active	
Gorham Scout Ranch	Great Southwest Council	Albuquerque, NM	Active	Formerly known as Camp Frank Rand.
Camp Kidd			Closed	
Camp Tres Ritos	South Plains Council	Vadito, NM	Active	
Dowling Aquatic Base	Conquistador Council	Carlsbad, NM	Active	Situated on the Pecos River.
Philmont Scout Ranch	Boy Scouts of America National Council	Cimarron, NM	Active	
Wehinahpay Mountain Camp	Conquistador Council	Sacramento, NM	Active	

=== New York ===
Camp name	Council	Location	Status	Notes
Adirondack HA Base				
Alpine Scout Camp	Greater New York Councils	Alpine, NJ		
Baiting Hollow Scout Camp	Suffolk County Council	Wading River, New York	Active	
Beech Mt. Scout Camp				
Big Moose Scout Camp				
Camp Apello				
Camp Aquehonga	Greater New York Councils	Tusten, NY	Active	Home to patrol cooking, Pool with slide, new scoutmaster lodge, and nicknamed "The Showplace of Ten Mile River"
Camp Askenonta	Onondaga Council	Moose Island (eastern shore) in Lake Placid	Closed, land sold to N.Y.S.	
Camp Babcock-Hovey	Seneca Waterways Council	Ovid, NY	Closed, for sale	This Scout camp in the Finger Lakes region opened in 1937. Closed in 2022. Has yet to be sold.
Camp Barton	Baden-Powell Council	[Trumansburg, NY	Closed, sold to NYS	This is the premier Scouts, BSA Camp located on Cayuga Lake. It first opened in 1927. It closed in 2021, was sold to NYS, has since reopened as a new NYS state park, though much of it remains closed for needed infrastructure repairs. Yet to be renamed as well.
Camp Bedford	Twin Rivers Council	Malone, NY	Closed	
Camp Boyhaven		Middle Grove, NY	Closed	sold in 2018 by Twin Rivers Council to private hands
Camp Bullowa	Greater Hudson Valley Council	Stony Point, NY	Active	
Camp Cutler	Seneca Waterways Council	Naples, NY	Active	Cub adventure camp
Camp Dittmer	Iroquois Trail Council [now Western NY Council]	Phelps, NY	Closed	Closed in 2022, was sold to FLX Retreats, which plans on redeveloping the former camp into a "destination and recreational facility." The lake on site was renamed "Heritage Lake" (https://flxretreats.com/heritage-lake/).
Camp Eaton Brook				
Camp Gorton				
Camp Gross				
Camp Hayden				
Camp Kingsley	Leatherstocking Council	Ava, NY	Active	Opened in 1921.
Camp Kunatah	Greater New York Councils			
Camp Lee				
Camp Loyalty				
Camp Merz				
Camp Moss				
Camp Mountaineer				
Camp Nooteeming	Greater Hudson Valley Council		Sold	
Camp Northern Lights				
Camp Onondaga				
Camp Osborn	Westchester-Putnam Council	Oscawanna Corners, NY	Closed	The remaining portion of original 56 acres was sold in 1981.
Camp Portaferry				
Camp Pouch	Greater New York Councils	Staten Island, NY	Active	
Camp Purchas				
Camp Russell	Revolutionary Trails Council	Woodgate, NY	Sold	
Camp Sam Wood	Iroquois Trail Council	Pike, NY	Active	Cub Scout Camp
Camp Saratoga		Saratoga Springs, NY	Closed	sold in 2001 by Twin Rivers Council It is now the Wilton Wildlife Preserve & Park. Approximately 25 acres of the 310-acre camp is owned by the Town of Wilton. New York State owns the remaining 285 acres.
Camp Schoellkopf	Greater Niagara Frontier Council			
Camp Scouthaven	Greater Niagara Frontier Council	Freedom, NY	Active	Purchased in 1918, operated as a Boy Scout resident camp until 1988. Mid-1990s, became the main Cub Scout resident camp for the GNF council, and remains so.
Camp Seneca	Elmira Council, now Five Rivers Council	Hector, NY	Closed (since 1989)	1924–1989, was previously a women's camp. Land was sold to Elmira Council in 1924. Sold to USDA in 1996, and is now part of the Finger Lakes National Forest (Caywood Point). It is on the National Register of Historic Places.
Camp Siwanoy	Westchester-Putnam Council	Wingdale, NY	Closed	1926-200? Previously operated by the Siwanoy, Siwanoy-Bronx Valley, and Hutchinson River Councils.
Camp Stonehaven				
Camp Syracuse				
Camp Tarion	Finger Lakes Council		Closed	1928?–1938. The camp was on Canandaigua Lake and was only accessible via boat during the summer.
Camp Tioughnioga				
Camp Ti-Wa-Ya-Ee				
Camp Tri-Mount	Rip Van Winkle Council			
Camp Turrell				
Camp Tuscarora				
Camp Twelve Pines				
Camp Vigor				
Camp Wakpominee	Twin Rivers Council	Fort Ann, NY	Active	
Camp Waubeeka	Hutchinson River Council	Copake, NY	Closed	Previously operated by Siwanoy-Bronx Valley, and Bronx Valley Councils.
Camp Wiccopee	Hendrick Hudson Council	Ossining	Closed	Closed in 1928.
Camp Wiccopee	Hendrick Hudson Council	Thompkins Corners	Closed	1928–1941, 1948. Closed during war years due to a shortage of manpower and transportation difficulties.
Camp Woodland	Longhouse Council		Active	Summer Cub camp with winter cabins.
Cedarlands Scout Reservation	Leatherstocking Council	Long Lake, NY	Sold	
Crumhorn Mt. BSA Camp				
Curtis S. Read Scout Reservation	Greater Hudson Valley Council	Brant Lake, NY	Active	Includes three camps: Waubeeka, Buckskin, and Summit Base.
Durland Aquatics Center	Westchester-Putnam Council	Rye, NY	Closed	
Durland Scout Reservation	Greater Hudson Valley Council	Putnam Valley, NY	Active	Formerly Clearlake Scout Reservation.
Floodwood Mountain Reservation				
Forestburg Scout Reservation				
Funkhouser Scout Camps				
Henderson Scout Reservation				
Henry Kaufmann Scout Camp				
Indian Village Camp				
Kamp Kamargo				
Lake George Island Camp				
Massawepie Scout Camps	Seneca Waterways Council	Piercefield, NY	Active	Boy Scout camp in the Andirondack Region. It first opened in 1952.
Massawepie Trails				
North Star Canoe Base				
Northern Lights Scout Camp				
Onteora Scout Reservation	Theodore Roosevelt Council	Livingston Manor NY	Active	
Ram's Gulch				
Rollins Pond Adventure Base				
Rotary Scout Reservation	Twin Rivers Council	Postenkill, NY	Active	
Sabattis Adventure Camp	Patriots' Path Council	Long Lake, New York	Active	Located in the Adirondack State Park in New York State.
Sabattis Scout Reservation	Longhouse Council	Long Lake, New York	Active	Located in the Adirondack State Park in New York State.
Schiff Scout Reservation	Theodore Roosevelt Council	Wading River, New York		
Stratton Mt. Scout Reservation				
Ten Mile River Scout Camps	Greater New York Councils	Narrowsburg, New York		
Thunder Rock				
Ti-Wa-Ya-Ee				
Toad Hollow				
Tri-Mount Scout Reservation	Rip Van Winkle Council			
Tuscarora Scout Reservation	Baden Powell Council	Windsor, NY		
Wolf Creek Camp				
Woodworth Lake Scout Reservation		Gloversville, NY	Closed	sold in 2013 by Twin Rivers Council and was turning into a housing development

=== North Carolina ===
Camp name	Council	Location	Status	Notes
East Carolina Scout Reservation	East Carolina Council	Blounts Creek, NC	Active	Formerly known as Herbert C. Bonner Scout Reservation; consists of Camp Boddie (formerly Camp Bonner South) and Pamlico Sea Base.
Camp John J. Barnhardt	Central NC Council	New London, NC	Active	
Camp Bob Hardin				
Camp Bowers	Cape Fear Council			
Camp Bud Schiele	Piedmont Council	Rutherford County, NC	Active	
Camp Charles	East Carolina Council	Bailey, NC	Sale Pending	
Camp Cherokee	Old North State Council	Yanceyville, NC	Active	
Camp Daniel Boone	Daniel Boone Council	Canton, NC	Active	
Camp Durant	Occoneechee Council		Active	
Camp Grimes				
Camp Mishemokwa				
Camp Noda				
Camp Reeves				
Camp Rockfish				
Camp Sam Hatcher	East Carolina Council	Newport, North Carolina	Active	
Camp Steere				
Camp Tom Upchurch				
Camp Uwharrie	Uwharrie Council		Closed	Camp Uwharrie, Greensboro, NC was one of the oldest Boy Scout camps in the United States. It was founded in 1922!
Camp Tuscarora				
Camp Wenasa	General Greene Council	Brown Summit, NC	Closed	
Cherokee Council Explorer Base				
Cherokee Scout Reservation	Old North State Council	Yanceyville, NC	Active	
Occoneechee Scout Reservation				
Piedmont Scout Reservation				
Raven Knob Scout Reservation	Old Hickory Council	Mount Airy, North Carolina	Active	Opened in 1955, Camp Raven Knob, as it is commonly called, hosts on average over 5,000 campers a summer and is located on approximately 3200 acres in Surry County, NC.
Schiele Scout Reservation				
Shikellamy Scout Reservation				

=== North Dakota ===
Camp name	Council	Location	Status	Notes
Heart Butte Scout Reservation	Northern Lights Council	Elgin, ND	Active	

=== Ohio ===
Camp name	Council	Location	Status	Notes
Beaumont Scout Reservation	Lake Erie Council	Rock Creek, Ohio	operating	Contains four camps: Broadbent, McCahill, McIntosh and Cub World
Camp Avery Hand	former Johnny Appleseed Council	Mansfield, Ohio	closed 2008	Now Ohio Bird Sanctuary
Camp Belden	former Greater Cleveland Council	Litchfield and Belden, Ohio	sold to Ohio Department of Natural Resources	Now Camp Belden Wildlife Area
Camp Berry	Black Swamp Area Council	Findlay, Ohio	Active	The summer camp program is no longer active as of 2026
Camp Buckeye	Buckeye Council	Beach City, OH	Closed	
Camp Chickagami	former Greater Western Reserve Council	Parkman, Ohio	Closed	Now Chickagami Park
Camp Falling Rock	Simon Kenton	Newark, OH	Active	formerly Licking County Council
Camp Friedlander	Dan Beard	Loveland (Cincinnati) OH	Active	100 year anniversary in 2019
Cub World Adventure camp	Dan Beard	Loveland (Cincinnati) OH	Active	
Camp Frontier	Erie Shores Council		operating	
Camp Hook				
Camp Hugh Taylor Birch (aka Camp Birch)	Tecumseh Council	Yellow Springs, Ohio	Active	
Camp John A. Owens				
Camp Lakota	Black Swamp Area Council	Defiance, Ohio	Active	
Camp Lazarus	Simon Kenton	Delaware, OH	Active	Cub Day Camp
Camp Longhorn	Central Ohio Council	Logan, OH	Closed	
Camp McKinley	Buckeye Council	Lisbon, Ohio	operating	
Camp Miakonda	Erie Shores Council	Toledo, Ohio	Operating	Created in 1917; one of the oldest camps in the United States
Camp Myron Kahn				
Camp Oyo	Simon Kenton		Active	No longer has summer camp offerings
Camp Stambaugh	Great Trails Council		Operating	
Camp Stigwandish	Lake Erie Council		Sold	
Camp Tuscazoar	Buckeye Council	Dover, Ohio	closed 1986	replaced by Seven Ranges Scout Reservation Now operated by the Camp Tuscazoar Foundation.
Camp Wyandot	Harding Area Council	Marion, Ohio	Closed	
Central Ohio Council Boy Scout Reservation				
Chief Logan Reservation	Simon Kenton	Ray, OH	Closed	
Clendening Scout Reservation	former Greater Cleveland Council		Closed 1987	
Cricket Holler	Miami Valley Council	Dayton, OH	Active	
Firelands Reservation	Lake Erie Council	Wakeman, OH	operating	contains two camps: Wyandot (named in honor of former Harding Area Council camp) and Avery Hand (named in honor of former Johnny Appleseed Council camp)
Fort Steuben Scout Reservation	Ohio River Valley Council	Tippecanoe, OH	Operating	
Leveque Scout Reservation	Central Ohio	Logan, OH	Closed	changed name to Green Hills Scout Reservation – Closed
Manatoc Scout Reservation	Great Trail Council	Peninsula, OH	operating	The Manatoc Scout Reservation is located within the Cuyahoga Valley National Park and contains two camps – Camp Butler and Camp Manatoc.
Muskingum Valley Scout Reservation	Muskingum Valley Council	Conesville, OH	operating	Est. 1968, has held summer camp each year since including during Covid. Council will be merging with Simon Kenton by the end of 2026, future is unknown
Pioneer Scout Reservation	Erie Shores Council	Pioneer, Ohio	operating	
Seven Ranges Scout Reservation	Buckeye Council	Kensington, Ohio	operating	
Shawnee Council Camps				
Stambaugh Scout Reservation	Great Trail Council	Canfield, OH	Operating	Est. 1919 under the Youngstown Council. Then came under the Mahoning Valley Council, in 1993 under the Greater Western Reserve Council, now under the Great Trail Council since 2017. Consists of Camp Stambaugh and Camp Akela.
Tinnerman Wilderness Canoe Base	former Greater Cleveland Council	Hartley Bay, Alban, Ontario	sold 2012	
Woodland Trails Scout Reservation	Miami Valley Council	Camden, OH	Closing 2022	

=== Oklahoma ===
Camp name	Council	Location	Status	Notes
Camp Cherokee	Cherokee Area Council	Grove, OK	Closed	
Camp Dierks	NeTseO Trails Council	Wright City, OK	Closed (2016)	Sold in 2017 after NeTseO Trails Council Merged with Circle Ten Council.
Camp George Thomas	Last Frontier Council	Apache, OK	Active	
Camp McClintock	Cherokee Area Council	Bartlesville, OK	Active	
Camp Sasakwa	Last Frontier Area Council	Holdenville, OK	Active	Established in the early 1920s; now used as a primitive camp.
Camp Simpson	Arbuckle Area Council	Milburn, OK	Active	
Hale Scout Reservation	Indian Nations Council	Talihina, OK	Active	
Kerr Scout Ranch	Last Frontier Council	Tishomingo, OK	Active	
Mabee Scout Reservation	Indian Nations Council	Locust Grove, OK	Active	
Will Rogers Scout Reservation	Cimarron Council	Cleveland, OK	Active	
Zink Scout Ranch	Indian Nations Council	Skiatook, OK	Active	

=== Oregon ===
Camp name	Council	Location	Status	Notes
Butte Creek Scout Ranch	Cascade Pacific Council	Scotts Mills, OR	Active	
Camp Baker	Oregon Trail Council	Florence, OR	Active	Originally named Camp Tsilcoos, renamed in 1963.
Camp Baldwin	Cascade Pacific Council	Dufur, OR	Active	
Camp Chinidere	Cascade Pacific Council	Cascade Locks, OR	Closed	Opened in 1918, destroyed by fire in 1925.
Camp Clark	Cascade Pacific Council	Cloverdale, OR	Active	
Camp Cooper	Cascade Pacific Council	Willamina, OR	Active	
Camp Ireland	Cascade Pacific Council	Hillsboro, OR	Active	
Camp Makualla	Crater Lake Council	Crescent Lake, OR	Active	
Camp McLoughlin	Crater Lake Council	Klamath Falls, OR	Active	
Camp Melakwa	Oregon Trail Council	McKenzie Bridge, OR	Active	
Camp Meriwether	Cascade Pacific Council	Cloverdale, OR	Active	
Camp Millard	Cascade Pacific Council	Estacada, OR	Inactive	Opened in 1925, closed around 1989.
Camp Morrison	Cascade Pacific Council		Inactive?	
Camp Pioneer	Cascade Pacific Council		Active	Located adjacent to the Mount Jefferson Wilderness area within the Willamette National Forest in Oregon. The camp is located south of Marion Forks, east of Oregon Route 22.
Camp Royce-Finel	Cascade Pacific Council	Warrenton, OR	Active	Originally Camp Cullaby.
Camp Wallowa	Blue Mountain Council	Joseph, OR		No longer used as a Boy Scout summer camp, but available for use by Scouting units.
Canyon Camp				
Scouter's Mountain	Cascade Pacific Council		Inactive	Site of Camp Discovery and Cub World. Sold in 2015.

=== Pennsylvania ===
Camp name	Council	Location	Acres	Status	Notes
Allegheny Trails Scout Camps				Closed|	
Anawanna Scout Reservation	Laurel Highlands Council			Closed|	
Bashore Scout Reservation	Pennsylvania Dutch Council	Jonestown, PA		Active	
Breyer Training Area	Philadelphia Council	Cheltenham		Closed	In 1929, Henry W. Breyer, Jr., purchased the abandoned Lindenhurst property once owned by John Wanamaker in Cheltenham on York Road, below Washington Lane. Breyer donated the former Wanamaker land to the Boy Scouts of America for use as a wildlife preserve. The camp was accessible to city Scouts by taking the train to the Jenkintown station. Camp Henry W. Breyer (40.0853°N 75.1311°W) was sold by the Philadelphia Council in 1990 and is now the site of Salus University.
Camp Acahela	Northeastern Pennsylvania Council	Blakeslee, PA		Active	This 242-acre camp was founded in 1919 and has offered an annual Cub Scout Resident camping program since 1992. It is located near the confluence of the Lehigh River and the Tobyhanna Creek.
Camp Brule					
Camp Bucoco	Moraine Trails Council				
Camp Chickasaw					
Camp Chiquetan					
Camp Coffman	Colonel Drake Council	Oil City, PA		Closed	
Camp Conewago	New Birth of Freedom Council				
Camp Conestoga	Westmoreland-Fayette Council	Somerset, PA		Active	
Camp Ganoga	York-Adams Area Council			Closed	Closed in 1945. Replaced by Camp Tuckahoe.
Camp Karoondinha	Susquehanna Council	Millmont		Active	
Camp Kiondashawa	Mercer County Council	Sharon, PA		Closed	Closed. Replaced by Custaloga Town Scout Reservation.
Camp Kline					
Camp Lavigne	Columbia-Montour Council	Benton, PA		Active	
Camp Minsi	Minsi Trails Council	Pocono Summit, Pennsylvania		Active	Founded in 1949, the 1,200-acre Boy Scout camp is located off of Pennsylvania Route 940 along the shores of the 314-acre Stillwater Lake in Pocono Summit.
Camp Mountain Run	Bucktail Council	DuBois, Pennsylvania		Active	
Camp Olmsted	Chief Cornplanter Council	Warren, Pennsylvania		Active	
Camp Rotawanis	Hazleton Area Council	Drums, Pennsylvania		Closed	Closed as a council Boy Scout camp in 1970s after Hazleton area merged with Minsi Trails Council. Occasional Scout unit camping and hiking events are conducted on site. Non-Scouting camping/hiking is also conducted.
Camp Semiconon					
Camp Seph Mack	Laurel Highlands Council	Penn Run, Pennsylvania			
Camp Sequoyah	Washington Trail Council	Erie, Pennsylvania		Closed	Closed. Property sold in 1984.
Camp Seven Mountains	Juniata Valley Council				
Camp Sinoquipe					
Camp Tionesta	Allegheny Trails Council	Tionesta, Pennsylvania		Closed 1976	
Camp Tuckahoe	New Birth of Freedom Council		1300	Active	The 1300-acre site is located a few miles west of Dillsburg, PA, on the border of Cumberland and York Counties.
Camp Ware	Chester County Council	Peach Bottom, PA		Active	
Camp Weygadt					
Coffman Scout Reservation					
Custaloga Town Scout Reservation	French Creek Council	Carlton, PA		Active	
Dale Sea Explorer Base					
Eagle Island	Philadelphia Council	Point Pleasant, PA		Inactive	See Treasure Island Scout Reservation.
Elk Lick Scout Reserve					
Goose Pond Scout Reservation	Northeastern Pennsylvania Council	Paupack Township, PA		Active	This 542-acre camp features a glacial lake and has been in continuous operation since 1920.
Hawk Mountain Scout Reservation	Hawk Mountain Council			Active	
Heritage Reservation	Laurel Highlands Council	Farmington, PA	2000	Active	Opened in 1980 to consolidate the three council camps onto one property. Heritage Reservation is Pennsylvania's premier summer camp facility, located in the Laurel Highlands, boasting 2,000 acres of beautiful mountain woodlands, fully encompassing the 270-acre Lake Courage with 6+ miles of shoreline. There are four camps: Camp Independence (Cub Scouts & Webelos), Camp Freedom (Boy Scouts with Dining Hall), Camp Liberty (Boy Scouts with food for you to prepare at your camp site), and Eagle Base (a high-adventure program).
Hidden Valley Scout Reservation	New Birth of Freedom Council	Loysville, PA		Active	
Horseshoe Scout Reservation	Chester County Council	Rising Sun, MD		Active	Located on the Mason–Dixon line separating Pennsylvania and Maryland. Divided into two camps: Camp Horseshoe, in Rising Sun, Maryland, and Camp John H. Ware, III, in Fulton Township, Lancaster County, Pennsylvania.
Hubbard Reservation					
J. Edward Mack Scout Reservation	Pennsylvania Dutch Council	Newmanstown, PA		Active	
Memorial Reservation					
Musser Scout Reservation	Cradle of Liberty Council			Active	Located along the Unami Creek on approximately 1400 acres in Marlborough Township, PA. The reservation is made up of three camps, Camp Hart, Camp Delmont, and Camp Garrison.
Oak Creek Reservation					
Ockanickon Scout Reservation	Washington Crossing Council	Pipersville, PA		Active	Founded in 1941, it is located along the Tohickon Creek and adjacent to Ralph Stover and High Rocks State Parks in Bucks County, Pennsylvania.
Resica Falls Scout Reservation	Cradle of Liberty Council			Active	Composed of Camp Firestone and Camp Big Springs. It is located north of East Stroudsburg, Pennsylvania in the Pocono Mountains.
Rock Hill Scout Reservation					
Seven Mountains Scout Camp	Juniata Valley Council				
Sinoquipe Scout Reservation	Mason-Dixon Council			Active	
Treasure Island Scout Reservation	Philadelphia and Cradle of Liberty Councils	Point Pleasant, PA		Inactive	
Trexler Scout Reservation	Minsi Trails Council	Jonas, PA		Inactive	Sold in 2023 to Trexler Veterans Initiative: Included Akelaland Cub Scout resident camp and Settlers Camp.
Valley Forge Council Sea Scout Base					
Weygadt Scout Reservation	Easton Area Council	Delaware Water Gap		Closed	Operated from 1931 until 1968; replaced by Camp Minsi.
Wizard Ranch	New Birth of Freedom Council	Hallam, PA			
		Little Hickory Lake, Poyntelle, PA		Closed	Some minor buildings still remain, but in severe disrepair. Land returned to original private ownership.

=== Rhode Island ===
Camp name	Council	Location	Status	Notes
Aquapaug Scout Reservation	Narragansett Council	South Kingston, RI	Active	
Buck Hill Scout Reservation	Narragansett Council	Pascoag, RI	Active	
Champlin Scout Reservation	Narragansett Council	South Kingston, RI	Active	
Cub World	Narragansett Council	Pascoag, RI	Active	Located in the Feinstein Youth Camp in Pascoag, RI.
Sandsland Reservation	Narragansett Council	New Shoreham, RI	Active	Located on Block Island in New Shoreham, RI.
Yawgoog Scout Reservation	Narragansett Council	Rockville, RI	Active	

=== South Carolina ===
Camp name	Council	Location	Status	Notes
Camp Barstow	Indian Waters Council	Batesburg-Leesville, SC	Active	Located on Lake Murray near the mouth of the Saluda River.
Camp Bob Hardin	Palmetto Area Council	Near Saluda, NC	Inactive	Known as Palmetto Area Council Camp until 1985.
Camp Coker	Pee Dee Area Council	Just outside Society Hill, SC	Active	
Camp Henry Shelor	Pee Dee Area Council	Near Manning, SC	Inactive	Was located on Lake Marion; operated from 1949 to 1999.
Camp Ho Non Wah	Coastal Carolina Council	Near Rockville, SC	Active	
Camp Inpaco	Pee Dee Area Council	Horry County, between Conway and Little River, SC	Inactive	Closed in the late 1960s.
Camp Old Indian	Blue Ridge Council	Near Travelers Rest, SC	Active	Established 1926

=== South Dakota ===
Camp name	Council	Location	Status	Notes
Camp Old Broadaxe	Black Hills Area Council	Near Nemo, SD	Sold	Closed in 1974.
Lewis and Clark Scout Camp	Sioux Council	Tabor, SD	Active	Located along the Missouri River on the Lewis and Clark Reservoir. Opened in 1957.
Medicine Mountain Scout Ranch	Black Hills Area Council	Custer, SD	Active	

=== Tennessee ===
Camp name	Council	Location	Status	Notes
Boxwell Scout Reservation	Middle Tennessee Council	Lebanon, TN	Active	
Camp Buck Toms	Great Smoky Mountain Council	Rockwood, TN	Active	
Charles E. Parrish Wilderness Reservation	Middle Tennessee Council	Rock Island, TN	Active	Also known as the "old" Camp Boxwell
Camp Cherokee				
Camp Davy Crockett	Sequoyah Council	Whitesburg, TN	Active	
Great Smoky Mountain Aquatics Base				
Grimes Canoe Base	Middle Tennessee Council	Linden, TN		
Latimer High Adventure Reservation	Middle Tennessee Council	Spencer, TN	Active	Trying to achieve national high adventure standards
Camp Mack Morris	West Tennessee Area Council	Camden, TN	Active	
Camp Pellissippi	Great Smoky Mountain Council	Andersonville, TN	Active	
Camp Tom Howard	Sequoyah Council	Bristol, TN	Closed	
Skymont Scout Reservation	Cherokee Area Council	Altamont, TN	Active	

=== Texas ===
Camp name	Council	Location	Status	Notes
Bear Creek Scout Reservation	Alamo Area Council	Hunt, TX	Active	Has been operating since 1957.
Buffalo Trail Scout Ranch	Buffalo Trail Council	Fort Davis, TX	Active	Acquired in 1947.
Camp Bill Stark	Three Rivers Council	Newton County, TX	Sold	Sold in the early 2010s.
Camp Billy Gibbons	Texas Trails Council	Richland Springs, TX	Active	
Camp Constantin	Circle Ten Council	Graford, TX	Active	Includes the Jack Furst Aquatics Base.
Camp Don Harrington	Golden Spread Council	Canyon, TX	Active	
Camp Fawcett	Texas Southwest Council	Edwards County, TX		Texas Southwest Council has recently leased the camp to a Houston-based hunting group.
Camp Hudson	Sam Houston Area Council	Houston, TX	Sold	Operated from 1925 to 1973.
James Ray Scout Reservation	Circle Ten Council	Sherman, TX	Active	Formerly known as Camp Grayson.
Camp Karankawa	Bay Area Councils	Sweeny, TX	Active	
Camp Merritt Lamb	El Paso Council	El Paso, TX	Closed	
Camp M.K. Brown	Golden Spread Council	Mobeetie, TX	Active	
Camp Perry	Rio Grande Council	Rio Hondo, TX	Active	Has operated continuously since 1927.
Camp Pirtle	East Texas Area Council	Carthage, TX	Active	
Camp Sol Mayer	Texas Southwest Council	Menard, TX	Active	
Camp Strake	Sam Houston Council	Coldspring, TX	Active	Sold in 2007. Reopened in 2020 at new location.
Camp Tahuaya	Longhorn Council	Belton, TX	Active	
Camp Tom Wooten	Capitol Area Council	Bastrop, TX	Active	The original Camp Tom Wooten operated as a Boy Scout summer camp from 1934 until its sale in 1983. The new location operates as a camp for Cub Scouts.
Camp Tonkawa	Texas Trails Council	Taylor County, TX	Active	
Camp Wisdom	Circle Ten Council	Dallas, TX	Active	
Camp Zach White	Yucca Council		Sold	
Chisholm Trail High Adventure Base	Longhorn Council	Bridgeport, TX	Active	Also known as the Texas High Adventure Base.
Clements Scout Reservation	Circle Ten Council	Athens, TX	Active	Consists of Camp Cherokee and Camp Meisenbach.
C.W. Post Memorial Camp	South Plains Council	Post, TX	Active	
El Rancho Cima	Sam Houston Area Council	Hays County, TX and Comal County, TX	Sold	Included Cockrell River Camp. Sold in 2018.
George W. Pirtle Scout Reservation	East Texas Area Council	Gary City, TX		
Hamman Scout Camp	Sam Houston Area Council	Bander, TX	Sold	
Hill Country Ranch	Bay Area Council		Closed	
Horizon Wilderness Scout Reservation	Northwest Texas Council	Bowie, TX	Sold	Developed into Silver Lake subdivision near Amon G. Carter lake in 2002.
Indian Creek Camp		Ingram, TX	Sold	
Laguna Station Sea Base	Rio Grande Council	South Padre Island, TX	Active	
Leonard Scout Reservation	Longhorn Council	Granbury, TX	Closed	
Lost Pines Scout Reservation	Capitol Area Council	Bastrop, TX	Active	
Mauritz Scout Reservation	South Texas Council	Ganado, TX		
Perkins Scout Reservation	Northwest Texas Council	Burkburnett, TX	Active	
Scott Scout Ranch	Three Rivers Council	Woodville, TX		Also known as Camp Urland.
Sid Richardson Scout Ranch	Longhorn Council	Bridgeport, TX	Active	Includes the Steele Island Aquatics Base.
Worth Ranch	Longhorn Council	Palo Pinto, TX	Active	Includes the Brazos River Canoe Trip (BRCT) high adventure trip. In operation since 1929. Cub Resident Camp debuted in 2019.

=== Utah ===
Camp name	Council	Location	Status	Notes
Bacon Memorial Park	Utah National Parks Council			
Bear Lake Aquatics Base	Great Salt Lake Council		Active	
Beaver High Adventure Base	Utah National Parks Council		Active	
Blue Mountain Scout Camp	Utah National Parks Council		Active	
Camp Browning	Trapper Trails Council	Huntsville, UT	Active	
Buck Hollow Scout Reservation	Utah National Parks Council		Active	
Bryant S. Hinckley Scout Ranch	Great Salt Lake Council		Active	Originally named East Fork of the Bear Scout Reservation.
Camp Evergreen	Great Salt Lake Council		Subsumed	Former camp at East Fork of the Bear Scout Reservation.
Camp Fife	Trapper Trails Council		Active	Located on the Bear River near Cutler Dam, just outside Fielding, Utah.
Camp Frontier	Great Salt Lake Council		Subsumed	Former camp at East Fork of the Bear Scout Reservation. It was replaced with Hinckley Scout Ranch sub-camps North Slope and Trail Head.
Camp Hunt Aquatics Base	Trapper Trails Council		Active	Located on the shores of Bear Lake in Garden City, Utah.
Camp Jeremiah Johnson	Utah National Parks Council		Active	
Camp Kiesel	Trapper Trails Council		Active	Located about 25 miles east of Ogden, Utah.
Camp Steiner	Great Salt Lake Council		Closed	
Camp Tomahawk	Great Salt Lake Council		Subsumed	Former camp at East Fork of the Bear Scout Reservation. It was replaced with Hinckley Scout Ranch sub-camps Pinnacle and Riverview.
Camp Tracy	Great Salt Lake Council		Active	
Camp Wilderness	Cache Valley Area Council		Closed	
Del Webb High Adventure Base	Las Vegas Area Council			
Entrada High Adventure Base	Utah National Parks Council		Active	
High Uintah Scout Camp	Utah National Parks Council		Active	
Horse Trek at Granite Ranch				
Maple Dell Scout Camp	Utah National Parks Council		Active	
Quail Creek	Utah National Parks Council			
Scofield Scout Camp at Frandsen Scout Ranch	Utah National Parks Council		Active	
Thunder Ridge Scout Camp	Utah National Parks Council		Active	
Tifie Scout Camp at Mountain Dell Scout Reservation	Utah National Parks Council		Active	

=== Vermont ===
Camp name	Council	Location	Status	Notes
Camp Sunrise	Green Mountain Council	Benson, VT	Active	
Mt. Norris Scout Reservation	Green Mountain Council	Eden Mills, VT	Active	

=== Virginia ===
Camp name	Council	Location	Status	Notes
Bayport Scout Reservation	Colonial Virginia Council	Jamaica	Closed	The deed to Bayport and the Newport News scouting office were turned over to the loaning bank in lieu of foreclosure saving the council. Wahunsenakah lodge then moved to the Pipsico Scout Reservation's Camp Kiwanis. and the Council Office was moved to a different location where a Donor granted the council free rent for several years until it could start to pay its own way.
Blue Ridge Scout Reservation	Blue Ridge Mountains Council	Hiwassee	Active	
Cub Adventure Camp	Heart of Virginia Council	Maidens, Virginia	Active	Cub Adventure Camp (est. 2002) offers year-round camping and outdoor programming which includes shooting sports, nature, swimming, aquatics, and camping for Cub Scout aged youth and their families.
Camp Baird (Lenhok'sin Program)	National Capital Area Council	Goshen	Active	
Camp Bowman	National Capital Area Council	Goshen	Active	
Camp Baker	Tidewater Council	Chesapeake	Temporarily Closed	This is a small acreage camp mainly for overnight camping
Camp Bolton Smith	Piedmont Area Council	Lynchburg, VA	Closed	
Camp Chickahominy	Peninsula Council	Lightfoot	Closed	Opened 1965, Closed in 2005
Camp Eagle Point	Heart of Virginia Council	Boydton	Active	Eagle Point is located on Kerr Reservoir (Buggs Island Lake) in Mecklenburg County, and is a short-term camping facility used for camporees.
Camp Hope	Peninsula Council	-	Closed	One of two properties for use by black Scouts on the Peninsula. Both camps were in operation from 1944 through 1965
Camp James River	Peninsula Council	-	Closed	One of two properties for use by black Scouts on the Peninsula. Both camps were in operation from 1944 through 1965
Camp Kiwanis	Tidewater Council	Spring Grove	Active	Current Home of Wahunsenakah Lodge #333 after the closing of Bayport Scout reservation.
Camp Lions	Tidewater Council	Spring Grove	Active	Current Home of Blue Heron Lodge #349
Camp Marriott	National Capital Area Council	Goshen	Active	
Camp Moonyah	Tidewater Council	Deep Creek	Active	This is a small acreage camp mainly for overnight camping
Camp Okee	Peninsula Council	Gloucester Point	Closed	Opened in 1942, closed 1965
Camp Ottari	Blue Ridge Mountains Council	Hiwassee, Virginia	Active	
Camp Powhatan	Blue Ridge Mountains Council	Hiwassee, Virginia	Active	
Camp Powhattan	Newport News Council	Gwynn's Island	Closed	Opened 1919, Closed 1946 Camp was sold to Roanoke Council in 1926. It appears that the Camp was repurchased in 1935 and renamed to Camp Sherwood by then Peninsula Council which operated it until 1946.
Camp Rock Enon	Shenandoah Area Council	Gore	Active	
Camp Roland				
Camp Rotary	Tidewater Council	Spring Grove	Active	
Camp Ross	National Capital Area Council	Goshen	Active	
S. Douglas Fleet	Heart of Virginia Council	Richmond	Active	Camp S. Douglas Fleet is the short-term camping facility located on the Heart of Virginia Council Scout Reservation with four camping areas.
Camp Shenandoah	Headwaters of Virginia Council	Swoope	Active	
Camp Sherwood	Peninsula Council	Gwynn's Island	Closed	Opened 1935 closed 1941 this camp may have originally been Camp Powhattan and renamed to Camp Sherwood when Peninsula Council purchased it back.
Camp Siouan	Old Dominion Area Council	Ebony, Virginia	Closed	Siouan offered summer camp from 1967 through 1989, and was sold in 1992 when Old Dominion Area Council merged with Peninsula Council to form Colonial Virginia Council. Approximate address: 1205 Siouan Rd, Ebony, VA 23845
Camp T. Brady Saunders	Heart of Virginia Council	Maidens, VA	Active	Camp T. Brady Saunders (est. 1964) Diverse program centered on adventure, leadership, and personal development with one of the finest STEM and outdoor leadership offerings in the region.
Camp Tye Brook	Piedmont Area Council	Lynchburg, VA	Closed	
Camp Washington	Newport News Council and Norfolk Council	Yorktown		Opened 1919 Sold to Norfolk Council in 1929, Closed 1932
Camp Waters	Old Dominion Area Council	Surry, Virginia	Closed	Camp Waters was the original camp for the Old Dominion Council. It was in operation from 1927 through 1966, at which time it was replaced by Camp Siouan. it appears that the camp was on Pleasant Point Road near the James River.
Claytor Lake Aq. Base	Blue Ridge Mountains Council	Hiwassee, Virginia	Active	
Goshen Scout Reservation	National Capital Area Council	Goshen	Active	
High Knoll Trail Camp	Blue Ridge Mountains Council	Hiwassee, Virginia	Active	
Camp Olmsted	National Capital Area Council	Goshen	Active	
Peninsula Scout Reservation	Peninsula Council	Lightfoot	Closed	
Pipsico Scout Reservation	Tidewater Council	Spring Grove	Active	
Camp PMI	National Capital Area Council	Goshen	Active	
Camp William B. Snyder	National Capital Area Council	Haymarket	Active	
Wilson Scout Reservation				

=== Washington ===
Camp name	Council	Location	Status	Notes
Camp Anawanna				
Camp Baldy				
Camp Black Mountain	Mount Baker Council	Maple Falls, WA	Closed	
Camp Bogardus	San Juan Island Troop 90 Trust	Friday Harbor, WA	Active	SJTroop4090
Camp Bonaparte	Chief Seattle Council	Tonasket, WA	Active	
Camp Chinook				
Camp Cleland	Tumwater Area Council	Eldon, WA	Closed	Located on Lower Lena Lake
Cowles Scout Reservation	Inland Northwest Council	Diamond Lake, WA	Active	
Camp Curran	Pacific Harbors Council	Summit, WA	Closed	
Camp Currie				
Camp Delezenne	Pacific Harbors Council	Elma, WA	Closed	
Camp Edwards	Chief Seattle Council	Snohomish, WA	Active	Cub Scout Resident Camp Pirates Cove, previously known as Camp Brinkley
Camp Fife	Chief Seattle Council	Naches, WA	Active	
Camp Hahobas	Pacific Harbors Council	Tahuya, WA	Closed	also known as Hahobas Scout Reservation
Camp Kilworth	Pacific Harbors Council	Federal Way, WA	Closed	
Camp Lewis	Cascade Pacific Council	Battle Ground, WA	Active	
Camp Meany (cub)				
Camp Parsons	Chief Seattle Council	Brinnon, WA	Active	
Camp Pigott	Chief Seattle Council	Snohomish, WA	Active	Previously known as Camp Omache; Part of the Cascade Scout Reservation
Camp Sheppard	Chief Seattle Council	Greenwater, WA	Active	
Camp Spirit Lake	Portland Area Council	Mount St. Helens, WA	Closed	Established 1955, destroyed in 1980 by Mount St. Helens eruption
Camp Thunderbird	Pacific Harbors Council	Olympia, WA	Active	(Cleland Scout Reservation) Located on Summit Lake
Camp Werner	Olympic Area Council	Chimacum, Wa	Closed	Located on Lake Gibbs
Cascade Scout Reservation	Chief Seattle Council	Monroe	Active	Encompassing camps: Camp Brinkley; Camp Pigott (formerly Camp Omache); Rocking T-H Ranch, open
Central Washington Summer Camp				
Fire Mountain Scout Camp	Mount Baker Council	Mt Vernon, WA	Active	
Mount Rainier Council Camp				
Pacific Northwest HA Treks				
Scout-a-Vista	Chief Seattle Council	Wenatchee, WA	Active	
Summit Lake Camp (Okanogan)	Grand Columbia Council	Omak, WA	Closed	on Summit Lake between Omak and Coulee City

=== West Virginia ===
Camp name	Council	Location	Status	Notes
Buckskin Scout Reservation	Buckskin Council	Dunmore, WV	Inactive	Also known as Dilley's Mill Scout Camp. Situated near Monongahela National Forest; plans have been made to sell the land.
Camp Arrowhead	Tri-state Area Council	Ona, WV	Active	
Camp Chief Logan	Buckskin Council	Chapmanville, WV	Active	
Camp Kootaga	Allohak Council	Walker, WV	Active	
Camp Mahonegon	Allohak Council	Buckhannon, WV	Closed	Plans have been made to sell the land.
Camp Mountaineer	Mountaineer Area Council	Morgantown, WV	Active	
James C. Justice National Scout Camp	BSA National	Glen Jean, WV	Active	At the Summit Bechtel Reserve.
Thomas S. Monson Leadership Excellence Complex	BSA National	Glen Jean, WV	Active	At the Summit Bechtel Reserve.
Camp Minter	Formerly Appalachian Council	Daniels, WV	Closed	Sold.
Paul R. Christen National High Adventure Base	BSA National	Glen Jean, WV	Active	At the Summit Bechtel Reserve.

=== Wisconsin ===
Camp name	Council	Location	Status	Notes
Bear Paw Scout Camp	Bay-Lakes Council	Mountain, WI	Active	Scout resident camp
Camp Decorah	Gateway Area Council	Holmen, WI	Active	
Camp Delavan	West Suburban Council	Delavan, WI	Closed	The land was sold to developers in the 1980s.
Camp Freeland Leslie	Three Fires Council	Oxford, WI	Closed	Sold in 2021.
Camp Indian Trails	Glacier's Edge Council	Janesville, WI	Closed	Climbing tower
Camp Long Lake	Potawatomi Area Council	St. Cloud, WI	Active	Located in Northern Unit of Kettle Moraine State Forest.
Camp Mach-Kin-O-Siew	Formerly Des Plaines Valley Council	Elcho, WI	Closed	Closed in 2015 by the consolidated Pathway to Adventure Council.
Camp Neibel	Formerly Indian Head Council	On the shores of Balsam Lake, WI	Closed	Opened around 1930s, closed 1954 and replaced by Tomahawk Scout Reservation. Named after Frank Neibel.
Camp Offield	State Line Council	Lake Geneva, WI	Closed	
Camp Oh-Da-Ko-Ta	Three Harbors Council	Burlington, WI	Active	Cub Scout camp
Camp Rokilio	Bay-Lakes Council	Kiel, WI	Active	Formerly operated as a Scout resident camp, it is now operated as a Cub Camp.
Camp Shin-Go-Beek	Formerly Des Plaines Valley Council	Waupaca, WI	Closed	Closed in 2015 by the consolidated Pathway to Adventure Council. Reopened in 2018 by private developer.
Camp Sinawa	Bay-Lakes Council	Valders, WI	Sold	Located on Pigeon Lake, it is now operated by an independent non-profit.
Camp Tichora	Four Lakes Council	Markesan, WI	Closed	
Camp Twin Lakes	Bay-Lakes Council	Waupaca, WI	Closed	Former Webelos resident camp; sold to private party.
Chin-Be-Gota Scout Reservation	Formerly Kedeka Area Council	Birnamwood, WI	Closed	
Gardner Dam Adventure Base	Bay-Lakes Council	White Lake, WI	Active	Operated as a Webelos resident camp.
Ed Bryant Scout Reservation	Glacier's Edge Council	Mauston, WI	Active	Formerly known as Camp Castle Rock; climbing tower.
Fred C. Andersen Scout Reservation	Northern Star Council	Houlton, WI	Active	Located on the banks of the St. Croix River near Houlton, WI.
Indian Mound Scout Reservation	Three Harbors Council	Oconomowoc, WI	Active	Cub Scout camp
Jax Camp	Bay-Lakes Council	Sturgeon Bay, WI	Active	Rustic Scout camp, located in Door County.
Camp Brown	Bay-Lakes Council	Porterfield, WI	Active	Rustic Scout camp
L.E. Philips Scout Reservation	Chippewa Valley Council	Rice Lake, WI	Active	
LeFeber Northwoods Camps	Three Harbors Council	Laona, WI	Closed	Sold in 2015.
Ma-Ka-Ja-Wan Scout Reservation	Northeast Illinois Council	Pearson, WI	Active	Ma-Ka-Ja-Wan consists of over 1,500 acres of beautiful forest, six spring-fed lakes, and a natural creek. The reservation is home to two full-service camps, a wilderness camp, a high adventure base, and a horse ranch.
Maywood Wilderness Scout Camp	Bay-Lakes Council	Hancock, WI	Sold	Sold in 2014.
Namekagon Scout Reservation	Northwest Suburban Council	Trego, WI	Closed	Sold in 1977.
Napowan Adventure Base	Pathway to Adventure Council (Northwest Suburban Council)	Wild Rose, WI	Closed	Closed in October 2021, to be sold.
Northern Wisconsin National Canoe Base	Boy Scouts of America	Boulder Junction, WI	Closed	Closed in 1983.
Robert S. Lyle Scout Reservation	Three Harbors Council	Elcho, WI	Inactive	Closed in 2015.
Tesomas Scout Camp	Samoset Council	Rhinelander, WI	Active	
Tomahawk Scout Reservation	Northern Star Council	Birchwood, WI	Active	3,100 acres located near Long Lake, WI.

=== Wyoming ===
Camp name	Council	Location	Status	Notes
Camp Buffalo Bill	Greater Wyoming Council	Cody, WY	Active	Located 7 miles east of Yellowstone National Park entrance.
Camp Jack	Longs Peak Council	Cheyenne, WY	Active	
Camp Laramie Peak	Longs Peak Council	Wheatland, WY	Active	
Camp Loll	Crossroads of the West Council (Previously Trapper Trails Council)	Ashton, WY	Active	Situated on Lake of the Woods near Yellowstone National Park.
Camp New Fork	Trapper Trails Council	Cora, WY	Active	Situated on the lower New Fork Lake.
Chimney Park Scout Camp	Longs Peak Council	Laramie, WY	Active	
Teton HA Base	Great Salt Lake Council	Jackson, WY	Active	

=== Outside the 50 US states ===
Camp name	Council	Location	Status	Notes
Cache Lake Scout Camp	W. D. Boyce Council	Sand Point Lake, Ontario	Active	
Guajataka Scout Reservation	Puerto Rico Council	Guajataca Lake, Puerto Rico	Active	
Camp Howard M. Wall	National Capital Area Council	Christiansted, Saint Croix		
Camp Tama	Far East Council	Tama, Tokyo	Active	

== Closed Camps ==
=== Alabama ===
Camp name	Council	Location	Status	Notes
Camp Arrowhead	Birmingham Area Council	Clanton	Closed	Camp Arrowhead operated from the early 1940s to 1971 and was located on the Coosa River.
Camp McKenzie	Birmingham Area Council	Pell City	Sold	
Camp Westmoreland	Greater Alabama Council	Florence	Closed	First opened in the 1920s and closing in the 1980s, Camp Westmoreland is located in Lauderdale County. However, it is still widely used to this day for both council and district activities. The camp was once a part of the Tennessee Valley Council, which merged with two other councils to form the Greater Alabama Council.
Camp Zin	Choccolocco Council	Anniston	Sold	Camp Zinn, in Dekalb County, operated from 1931 to 1965. At a September 8, 1966 meeting, the Official Board of Camp Lee, a United Methodist Church organization, purchased the camp from the Choccolocco Council, and renamed it Camp Lee.

=== Arizona ===
Camp Name	Council	Location	Status	Notes
Camp Levi Levi	Las Vegas Area Council	Kingman	Closed	Located in the Hualapai Mountains 14 miles south of Kingman, Arizona, at an elevation of 7,000 feet.
Lake Pleasant Camp	Grand Canyon Council	Peoria	Inactive following 2019 season	Operated in cooperation with the Maricopa County Parks Department; Not Council Owned Property. An aquatics and nature based camp located at the Desert Outdoor Center at Lake Pleasant 20 miles north of central Phoenix in Peoria, Arizona.

=== Arkansas ===
Camp name	Council	Location	Status	Notes
Camp Cedar Valley	Eastern Arkansas Council	Hardy	Sold	This camp served the Eastern Arkansas Council from 1942 to 1966, when it was sold to a developer. It was located 5.5 miles southwest of Hardy, AR on the Spring River. Originally 95 acres, an additional land purchase brought this up to 255 acres.
Pine Trail Reservation/Camp Cedar Valley	Eastern Arkansas Council	Viola	Sold	In 2002, after the merger of the Eastern Arkansas Area Council into the Quapaw Area Council, Camp Cedar Valley was promptly sold to a private owner. It is still an active camp, on 777 acres just south of Viola, Arkansas on U.S. 412, in the foothills of the Ozark Mountains.
Camp Pioneer	Caddo Area Council	Hatfield	Active	
Camp Quapaw	Quapaw Area Council	Benton	Closed	Camp Quapaw opened in 1925 and was located on the Saline River west of Benton in Saline County. In 1976 when Camp Kiwanis was purchased, Camp Quapaw was then closed and the land was later sold.
Rhodes Scout Reservation	Ouachita Area Council	Bismarck	Sold	In 2012, after the merger of Ouachita Area Council and the Quapaw Area Council, the Rhodes Scout Reservation, a 16,000±acre camp on Lake DeGray in Bismarck, AR, was sold to the Ouachita Camp Foundation, in partnership with the U.S. Army Corps of Engineers and the Ross Foundation. It is still available for use by the troops of the Quapaw Area Council as a private campsite.

=== California ===
Camp name	Council	Location	Status	Notes
Ahwahnee Scout Reservation	Northern Orange County Council	Green Valley Lake	Closed	Closed in 1980, sold in 1991
Camp 49'er	Greater Yosemite Council	Arnold	Closed	
Camp Ahwahnee	Northern Orange County Council	Green Valley Lake	Closed	Closed in 1980
Camp Anza	Orange Empire Council	Anza Valley	Closed	
Camp Arataba	California Inland Empire Council	Barton Flats	Closed	Closed in 1960.
Camp Baxter	Greater Yosemite Council	Arnold	Closed	
Camp Berryessa	Silverado Council	Napa	Closed	Closed in 2004
Camp Bob McBride	Greater Yosemite Council	Pinecrest Lake	Closed	
Camp Cedarbrook	Alameda Council	Long Barn	Closed	Closed in 1999
Camp Crescent M	San Francisco Council	Lake Tenaya, Yosemite	Closed	1927–1962. High adventure camp. Non permanent.
Camp Dimond-O	Oakland Area Council / San Francisco Bay Area Council	Mather, CA	Closed	1926–1978. Located outside of Yosemite.
Camp Dimond	Oakland Area Council	Oakland, CA	Closed	1919–1948. Located at the head of Dimond Canyon in Oakland. The property was sold to the Oakland Public Schools. Currently Joaquin Miller Elementary School and Montera Middle School occupy the site.
Camp Ed Barrer	Pacific Skyline Council	Avery	Closed	
Camp French	Los Padres Council	Arroyo Grande	Closed	Closed in 2014
Camp Harvey West	Golden Empire Council	Echo Lake (California)	Closed	Located on Upper Echo Lake at 7,500 feet in the Eldorado National Forest near the Desolation Wilderness. A summer camp, it had 12 troop campsites, and a staff of around 30.
Camp Josepho	Western Los Angeles County Council		Closed	Opened in 1941, the 110-acre camp is located in the Santa Monica Mountains in Los Angeles County. Burned in a "complete loss" during the 2025 Palisades Fire
Camp Kit Carson	Pacific Skyline Council	Caples Lake	Closed	
Camp Lindblad	Mount Diablo Silverado Council	Boulder Creek	Closed	Sold in 2017
Camp Lilienthal - Marin	San Francisco Council / San Francisco Bay Area Council	Fairfax, CA	Closed	1929–1973. First all weather camp of the SF Council.
Camp Lilienthal - SF	San Francisco Council	San Francisco, California	Closed	1919–1925. Located in Stern Grove next to Pine Lake.
Camp Loomer	Oakland Area Council / San Francisco Bay Area Council	Pollack Pines, California	Closed	1957–1973.
Camp I-Yee-Que	Redwood Area Council	Near Santa Rosa	Closed	
Camp Pico Blanco	Silicon Valley Monterey Bay Council	Big Sur	Active	Closed due to fire
Camp Meek	Oakland Area Council	San Lorenzo, California	Closed	1942–1952. Located across the street from current San Lorenzo High School.
Camp Minkalo	Greater Yosemite Council	Amador County	Closed	
Camp Masonite Navarro	Redwood Empire Council		Closed	Sold in 2012. Located near Navarro in Mendocino County, CA.
Camp Myford	Orange County Council	Irvine	Closed	
Camp Pacifica		Ahwahnee	Closed	Currently a Lions Club camp
Camp Pollock	Golden Empire Council	Sacramento	Closed	Sold to the Sacramento Valley Conservancy.
Camp Rokili	Orange County Council		Closed	
Camp Silverado	Silverado Area Council	Pioneer, CA	Closed	Closed in 2003
Camp Stephens	Alameda Council	Pinecrest Lake	Closed	
Camp Wolverton	Western Los Angeles County Council		Closed	Located in the Sequoia National Park. Closed in 2012
Circle B Scout Ranch	Old Baldy Council		Closed	Open from the late 1950s until 1974, it was located in the southern Sierra Nevada northeast of Lake Isabella and due west of China Lake Naval Weapons Station.
Glacial Trails Scout Ranch	Golden Empire Council	Tahoe National Forest	Closed	Reopened as Camp Robert L. Cole.
Holt Scout Ranch	San Gabriel Valley Council		Closed	Closed in 1974. Previously known as Camp Cedar Canyon
Hual-Cu-Cuish	San Diego County Council	Julian, CA	Closed	Closed in 1999.
Jubilee Scout Ranch	Western Los Angeles County Council	Pinon Hills, CA	Closed	Closed in 2003.
Log Cabin Wilderness Camp	Los Angeles Area Council	Tioga Pass Road	Closed	Closed in 2016.
Pardee Scout Sea Base	Western Los Angeles County Council	Marina Del Rey	Closed	Closed in 2008
Rancho Las Flores	Orange County Council		Closed	At Camp Pendelton
Verdugo Pines	Verdugo Hills Council	Valyermo	Closed	Sold in 1963
Camp Wallace Alexander	Piedmont Council	Spanish Creek, Plumas County	Closed	Operated from 1929 to 1972
Will J. Reid Reservation	Long Beach Area Council	Long Beach	Closed	Closed in 2010

Camp Cherry Valley Closed in 2024 Greater Los Angeles Area Council

=== Florida ===
Camp Name	Council	Location	Status	Notes

=== Hawaii ===
Camp name	Council	Location	Status	Notes
Camp Alan Faye	Aloha Council	Waimea	Closed	Closed in 2026. Formerly located in Koke'e State Park on the island of Kauaʻi, adjacent to Waimea Canyon State Park, 13 miles from the town of Waimea, HI.
Camp Honokaia	Aloha Council	Honokaa	Closed	Sold in 2026. Formerly a 210-acre site, located between Honokaa and Waimea (Kamuela) above Waipio Valley, known as the "Valley of Kings" on the Big Island of Hawaii.
Camp Pohoiki	Kilauea Council	Pohoiki	Closed	

=== Maryland ===
Camp name	Council	Location	Status	Notes
Camp Chesapeake	National Capital Area Council	Lusby, Maryland	Closed	1952-1956 Located in Calvert County, Maryland, Camp Chesapeake was opened in 1952 and had 100 acres of land now Calvert Cliffs State Park.
Camp Cone	Baltimore Area Council	Jerusalem, Maryland	Closed	Now part of the Gunpowder Falls State Park
Camp Potomac	Potomac Council		Closed	In 2013 the council closed Camp Potomac, which was located in Oldtown, Maryland.
Camp Theodore Roosevelt	National Capital Area Council	Chesapeake Beach, MD	Closed	The camp was about 8 miles south of Chesapeake Beach. It was sold in the late 1970s.
Camp Woodrow Wilson	National Capital Area Council	Four Corners, Maryland	Closed	

== See also ==
- Local councils of the Boy Scouts of America
- List of local councils of the Boy Scouts of America
- Defunct local councils of the Boy Scouts of America
- List of summer camps
- Historically notable Scout camps
- Camps of Scouts Canada
