= Camps of Scouts Canada =

Scouts Canada operates about 200 Scout camps across Canada.

== List of local councils ==
Camps of Scouts Canada, currently includes:

- Impeesa Extreme
- Haliburton Scout Reserve
- Camp Byng
- Camp Barnard
- Camp Opemikon

=== Former camps ===
Tamaracouta Scout Reserve, which opened in 1912 and closed in 2018 was among the oldest continually operating Scout camps in the world.

== See also ==
- List of council camps (Boy Scouts of America)
- Historically notable Scout camps
