= Los Padres Council =

Council of the Boy Scouts of America

Los Padres Council (#053)
- Owner: Boy Scouts of America
- Headquarters: Santa Barbara, California
- Country: United States
- Founded: 1917
- Website www.lospadresscouting.org

The Los Padres Council was founded in 1917 as the Santa Barbara Council. The SBC changed its name in 1929 to the Mission Council and stayed that way until 1994.

== History ==
In 1994, the Santa Lucia Area Council merged with the Mission Council to form the Los Padres Council. The Santa Lucia Area Council (#056) was founded in 1933, as the San Luis Obispo County Council. The Central Coast Counties council (#025), founded in 1922 merged into Santa Barbara in 1924.

== Organization ==
- Pacific Coast District
- Cuesta District

== Camps ==
- Rancho Alegre

Camp Rancho Alegre was severely damaged by the Whittier Fire in 2017 and as of 2020 is being rebuilt.

== Order of the Arrow ==
- Chumash Lodge #90

== See also ==
- Scouting in California
