= Camp Robert L. Cole =

Boy Scout camp in Northern California

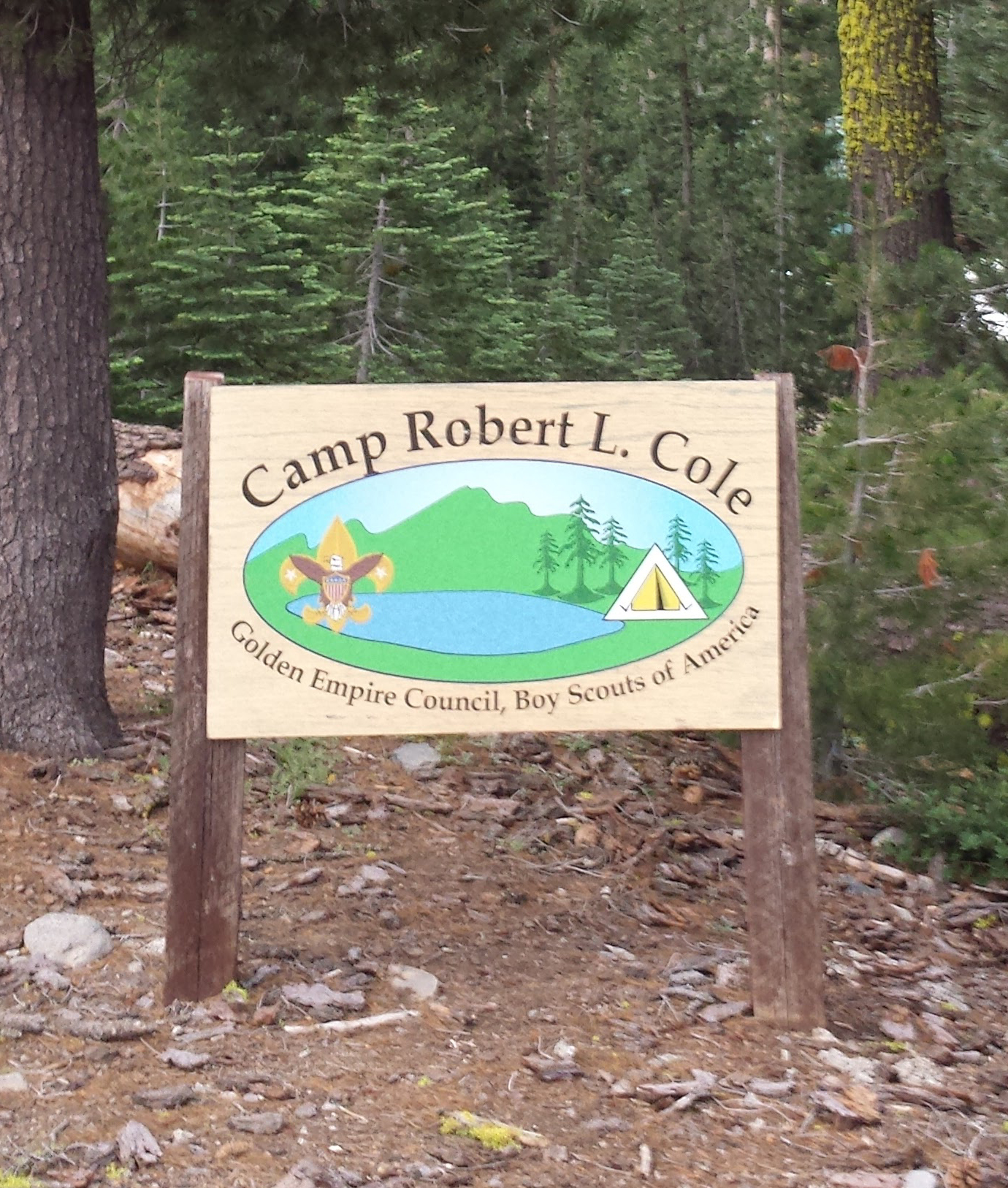
- Camp Robert L Cole entrance
- Owner: Golden Empire Council
- Headquarters: Sacramento, California
- Location: Cisco Grove, California
- Country: United States
- Coordinates: 39.3514882°N 120.4944603°W
- Founded: 1954
- Founders: Alden Barber; Ed Wilson; Jim Carnahan
- Website; Camp Robert Cole

Camp Robert L. Cole is a Boy Scout camp in the Tahoe National Forest in Northern California. It is notable for its high altitude of 7,200 feet (2,200 m) and the surrounding alpine forest and 13 nearby lakes. It is located 6 miles (9.7 km) north of Cisco Grove, California off of Interstate 80 (I-80), about 32 miles (51 km) west of Truckee, California. It is on the south shore of Lake Sterling on leased land owned by the U.S. Forest Service and Pacific Gas & Electric Company .

== Location ==
The camp is located at an altitude of 7,200 feet (2,200 m) in the Tahoe National Forest next to Lake Sterling. It is 6 miles (9.7 km) north of Cisco Grove, California. The surrounding alpine forest contains 13 nearby lakes and streams supporting trout. There are so many lakes that some of them are just assigned numbers.

== Former summer camp program ==
The Golden Empire and prior councils offered summer camp at Camp Cole for many years. In 2015 the camp was open for three weeks from July 20 to August 8. The cost was $250.

When used as a Boy Scout summer camp, the program featured a six-day, 50 miles (80 km) trek through the nearby mountains known as the Cole Trek. Cole also offered Mountain Biking Treks, Rock Climbing, Mountain Man Program, and a unique Build Your Own Program week. A trading post provided snacks and merit badge supplies during camp. Meals during summer camp were served cafeteria style.

The waterfront program included swimming, canoeing, snorkeling, small boats, and board-sailing. The camp provided a limited number of Scouts with a series of activities that helped them satisfy many of the requirements for First Class rank.

Due to ongoing poor road conditions and the gift of land for a new camp at a lower elevation, the council stopped providing a summer camp program at Camp Cole in 2015.

== Hiking ==
To the northeast of Lake Sterling there is about a 1 square mile (2.6 km^{2}) of glacial rock and ponds, originally called Glacier Lakes Basin Trails. The trail system usually follows watercourses and is prone to be wet after rain, requiring detours. The trails cross many many marsh areas as well. There are two marked trail systems, red and blue, accessible by crossing the dam, and staying to the right around a helipad. Both connect to Mossy Pond located to the northeast. The red trail is to the west (13E01A) and the blue trail veers east. From the dam the red trail goes left while the blue trail continues along the lake. The blue or east trail is easier, more popular, and is usually well marked. It is also usually wetter than the more challenging red trail to the west.

== History ==
The council built a permanent kitchen in 1957, and after a severe winter storm severely damaged it, were forced to rebuild it in 1958. It was reconstructed once again in 1970, during which volunteers also built a new staff dining building.

The Golden Empire Council closed the Glacial Trails Scout Ranch in 2003 and 2004 when they were unable to pay for improvements required by the Placer County health dept and the U.S. Forest Service. Robert L. Cole, President of Goodwin-Cole Company, contributed $260,000 in a matching grant to help pay for the necessary upgrades. The camp was reopened as a high-adventure camp in 2005. After 53 years as the Glacial Trails Scout Ranch, the camp was renamed as Camp Robert L. Cole on July 21, 2007 to honor contributions made to the council and camp by Cole. The Cole family continued to support the camp and facilities through its closure as a council summer camp in 2015.

== Weather ==
Due to the camp's altitude, snow may be present in camp during June and even July. On one July 4th weekend, Scout camp staff had to ski over 6 foot (1.8 m) snow drifts to access the camp, and the summer camp program was cancelled until mid August. During most years, the camp is accessible and free of snow by about July 1. The weather during summer camp season typically ranges from 56-94 °F. It rains an average of ½ inch during July.

== In popular media ==
The camp had a mountain biking program during the 1980s that was featured in an article in Boys' Life magazine in May 1989.

== See also ==
- Tahoe National Forest
