= Sabattis Scout Reservation =

Coordinates: 44°5′51″N 74°43′33″W

The Sabattis Scout Reservation is a 1,500 acre former Boy Scout camp located in the Five Ponds Wilderness Area between Tupper Lake and Long Lake in New York. In 2025, the owners of the camp, the Longhouse Council of the Boy Scouts of America, sold it for $2 million to the Open Space Institute who will then sell it to the state of New York to join it to the Adirondack Forest Preserve.

Sabattis Scout Reservation should not be confused with Sabattis Adventure Camp, another former scout camp which was located near by and was owned by the Patriots Path Council in New Jersey.
