= Ventura County Council =

Boy Scouts of America local council

Ventura County Council #057
- Owner: Boy Scouts of America
- Headquarters: Camarillo, California
- Country: United States
- Founded: 1921
- Website vccbsa.org

Ventura County Council of the Boy Scouts of America was officially chartered as Council 57 on June 23, 1921, after a series of meetings that followed a proposal put forward at a County Chamber of Commerce meeting on March 28, 1921, in the Masonic Hall. Mr. C. H. Whipple, then of Moorpark and later Oxnard, became the president; and Col. J.L. Howland became commissioner. Harvey R. Cheesman, an assistant scout executive in the Los Angeles Council, became the first Scout Executive, assuming his duties on July 11.

== History ==
The original charter indicates that there were nine troops in existence at the time. In June 1910 the Ventura Free Press published an article, "Boys Organize Band of Scouts".

A band of Scouts was organized in the Pastor's study of the Congregational Church Monday evening, June 20. So far as we can learn this is the first organization of this worldwide movement in Ventura or even in California. The movement originated in the mind of Ernest Thompson Seton. It has been pushed in England under the leadership of General Baden Powell, and now there are in England three hundred thousand boys enlisted in the movement.

We have framed our constitution after the international one, but changed it to meet the needs of our Western life and customs. It includes the things that tend to the physical and moral development of the live boy.

Tramps in the hills, with the study of nature, will be a part of the physical development. It also includes many of the things called for by Thompson Seton. For the moral development, we have first the study of the Book, each Sunday.

Honor in all things is called for. Each boy must attend school if possible, must have some regular labor for which he receives pay.

Six months after membership is attained he must have a bank account in his own name. Our badge will be the arrowhead, with the words upon it, "Be Prepared. These words have great significance known only to the wearers of the badge, in fact it is the sign to them of life, and can be taken from them if it is not honored.

The band now numbers only twelve, but the invitation is extended to any boy of proper age who is not in any Sunday School, and wishes to live a clean life to join us. We say "come with us and we will do you good".

Records of the Ventura Congregational church indicate that the group was officially disbanded in January 1914. Various articles gleaned from the local newspapers indicate that troops were active in most of the local communities. The YMCA had one in Santa Paula in 1911. They then formed another in Fillmore in 1912 with 25 boys. The scoutmaster was Mr. A.J. Dicks, and his assistant Professor A.C. Marcey. Ray Horton was the Seal Patrol leader, and his brother Harold leader of the Foxes. The same article mentions leaders from a group of 20 scouts in Bardsdale helping to form the group. In February 1913, the Oxnard Courier talks of a YMCA group under Scoutmaster Kirchner and Commissioner Stant, while in November 1913 the Star mentions Scoutmaster Ramsey expecting to enroll as many as 100 boys and young men and is setting up a recruiting station at City Hall. A later Courier article in February 1916 mentions Scoutmaster Rev. J.M. Barhart, assisted by Ross Winter and Elmer Johnson, while the committee consisted of George Hume, Frank Petit, and J.W. Shillington. A surname that appears in the boys noted, Willett is very familiar to longtime scouters in the council, as Camp Willett gets its name from the family.

The earliest of these was Troop 1, sponsored by St. Paul's Methodist Episcopal Church of Oxnard from February 1916 to February 1918. Next in line is Troop 1 (later 301) of Santa Paula sponsored by The Clipper Club of Presbyterian Mariners Club from December 1917 to December 1919, again from November 1920 to November 1933, and once more from August 1934 to February 1963. Moorpark Troop 1, sponsored by the Community M.E. Church existed from December 1919 to December 1922; Ojai Troop 1, by a Group of Citizens, went from December 1919 to December 1920; and Troop 1 of Ventura (later 101), sponsored by the Rotary Club appears from December 1919 to December 1926. 101 still exists today, but is sponsored by the Church of Jesus Christ of Latter Day Saints, its last reincarnation after an interim sponsorship by the Kiwanis. Troop 1 of Port Hueneme appears to have existed, beginning in April 1916; but disappears before the council was chartered.

== Organization ==
- Chumash District — Camarillo, Somis, Point Mugu, Oxnard, El Rio, Port Hueneme, Ventura, Oak View, Ojai, Santa Paula, Fillmore and Piru
- Tierra Rejada District — Thousand Oaks, Westlake Village, Newbury Park, Simi Valley & Moorpark

== Camps ==
Camp Three Falls is located in the Los Padres National Forest at the base of Mount Piños in the northern portion of Ventura County, approximately 90 miles (140 km) from the council's headquarters in Camarillo. The camp has been in operation since 1933. The name is derived from three waterfalls—North Falls, Middle Falls, and Bitter Falls—that are located on the streams running from the mountains above the camp. The camp is at 5,400 feet (1,600 m) elevation. The summer weather at this elevation is dry and the temperature ranges from 70-90 °F with cool evenings and crisp nights. Snow is common in winter.

Ventura County Council offered summer camp programs for both Boy Scouts and Webelos Scouts.

Facilities include a swimming pool (seasonal and unheated); lake with canoes and rowboats; rifle, shotgun, and black powder ranges; archery range; nature lodge and nature trail. A signature feature is a frontier-style log fort, which is a replica of the one on Tom Sawyer Island at Disneyland. The fully equipped dining hall seats about 175 people. There are 10 cabins that sleep about 40, and campsites accommodate 200-plus tent campers.

Camp Three Falls was one of the first BSA summer camps to offer Rock Climbing and Rappelling, starting in 1973. A 57-foot (17 m) Climbing tower was constructed in the spring of 2003.

After years of disrepair to the camp and Lake Wood being dry, Three Falls could no longer meet Scouting America's National Camp Accreditation program.

Camp Three Falls was sold in November of 2024 to Sosé & Allen’s Legacy Foundation, a nonprofit aimed at bridging the gap between Armenia and its Diaspora.

Camp Willett Mrs. Edith Scott Willett donated a 535-acre (217 ha) plot near Oak View, California, in 1954 and named in her honor. Camp Willett has been used for events such as Camporees. Aside from plumbed water and "kybos" (pit toilet outhouses) there are no facilities at this camp.

== Order of the Arrow ==
- Topa Topa Lodge #291

Many years ago the Chumash Indians roamed the forests and hunted game in the bountiful Ojai Valley. When a bad omen came to the tribe, the great spirit sent two white gophers to Chief Matilija. The gophers instructed the chief and his people to perform acts of unselfish service and sacrifice. Chief Matilija perished in a great calamity, but with the acts of service and devotion done, the great spirit sent Chief Topa Topa to the Chumash to save the people from an evil horde. In the 1920s the spirit of unselfish service was rekindled at Ventura County Council's Camp Grey. There, the "Tribe of Matilija" was founded as the honor camping organization of the council. The tribe had as its purpose to promote camping at Camp Grey. The Order of the Arrow in Ventura County was established in June 1944, when ceremonies were conducted during the Camp-O-Ral at Steckel Park to induct 13 selected scouts as charter members of Topa Topa Lodge #291 of the Order of the Arrow. Thus the Order of the Arrow came to replace the "Tribe of Matilija." The new lodge took its name from the legendary Chief Topa Topa.

== See also ==
- Scouting in California
