= Pioneer Scout Reservation =

- Owner: Erie Shores Council
- Location: 7371 County Rd S, Pioneer, OH
- Country: United States
- Coordinates: 41°41′45″N 84°41′00″W
- Founded: 1969

The Richard P. Anderson Pioneer Scout Reservation also known as Pioneer Scout Reservation (PSR) and Camp Frontier was opened in 1969 by Erie Shores Council. It is a Scout camp in northwest Ohio and southeast Michigan just west of Pioneer, Ohio. The camp itself is just over 1200 acres. It hosts many events year round like spring/fall camporees and camp Alaska in the winter, but is most known for its summer program Camp Frontier which is very popular and one of the best programs in the area. This camp has many different areas for their Camp Frontier program, such as, shooting sports which includes, the rifle range, shotgun range, and archery range. There is also a pool, a lakefront, high and low COPE, COSA, Frontier Trading Co., ATV, Amphitheater, chapel, Frontier HQ, a dining hall, T21/Eagle, a climbing tower, extreme sports, handicrafts, trading post, a health lodge, Loftus Lodge, an ecology center, quartermaster building, 3 telescopes, four cabins, and three shower houses. The camp has three lakes, Lake Spieker (which is where the lakefront is), Lake MacNichol, and Lake Teagarden.

== Camp Frontier ==
=== Program Areas ===
==== Aquatics ====
- The Aquatics program consists of two areas, the pool and the lakefront. Here scouts learn about aquatic related merit badges from the well trained staff who are also Red Cross certified lifeguards. The aquatics program is one of the biggest and most popular programs in camp.
- The pool is where some of the eagle required merit badges are taught, which are lifesaving and swimming. The pool has three different parts for the three different swimming classes (learner, beginner, and swimmer). The learner section is only three feet deep, the beginner section is three to five feet deep, and the swimmer section is five to nine feet deep and also has a diving board.
- The lakefront is where scouts can swim from 3:00 to 5:00 in open swim. The lakefront has three different parts, the beginner section, the learner section, and the swimmer section.

==== T21 ====
- The eagles nest, better known as T21, is located in the generalized center of where programs take place.
- Many of the camps eagle required merit badges are taught here. These include: Citizenship in the community, world, and nation, communication, personal management, and various other merit badges.
- Instructional lessons are given for various rank requirements throughout the day, which can be attended by anyone.

==== Handicrafts ====
- The program area focuses on more creative skills such as basketry, art, metalworking, welding, or graphic arts. No eagle required merit badges are taught here.
- The area also offers various activities each day such as tie dye, "boondoggling", sand candles, a chess tournament, leather crafts, and screen printing.
- The area is expected to move into a new building by MacNichol in the summer of 2020 or 2021.
