= Scouting America membership controversies =

Scouting America, formerly the Boy Scouts of America (BSA), one of the largest private youth organizations in the United States, has policies which prohibit those who are not willing to subscribe to the Scouting America's Declaration of Religious Principle, which has been interpreted by some as banning atheists, and, until January 2014, prohibited all "known or avowed homosexuals" from membership in its Scouting program. The ban on adults who are "open or avowed homosexuals" from leadership positions was lifted in July 2015.

The BSA had contended that its policies were essential in its mission to instill in young people the values of the Scout Promise, or Oath, and Scout Law. The organization's legal right to have these policies was upheld by the United States Supreme Court. In Boy Scouts of America v. Dale (2000), the Supreme Court of the United States affirmed that as a private organization, the BSA can set its own membership standards. The BSA's policies have been legally challenged but have not been found to constitute discrimination because as a private organization in the United States, the BSA has the right to freedom of association, as determined in the court case. In recent years, the policy disputes have led to litigation over the terms under which the BSA can access governmental resources, including public lands.

These policies have led to various disputes and controversies. On May 23, 2013, the BSA's National Council approved a resolution to remove the restriction denying membership to youth on the basis of sexual orientation alone effective January 1, 2014. BSA removed a similar restriction for adult leaders on July 27, 2015.

== Positions of Boy Scouts of America ==
According to its mission statement, the Boy Scouts of America seeks "to prepare young people to make ethical and moral choices over their lifetimes by instilling in them the values of the Scout Oath and Law". All members are required, as a condition of membership, to promise to uphold and obey both of these pledges. The texts of the BSA's Scout Oath and Scout Law for Boy Scouting have remained unchanged since they were approved in 1911, and every member agrees to follow them on their application form.

Scout Oath
On my honor I will do my best
To do my duty to God and my country
and to obey the Scout Law;
To help other people at all times;
To keep myself physically strong,
mentally awake, and morally straight.

Scout Law A Scout is trustworthy, loyal, helpful, friendly, courteous, kind, obedient, cheerful, thrifty, brave, clean, and reverent.

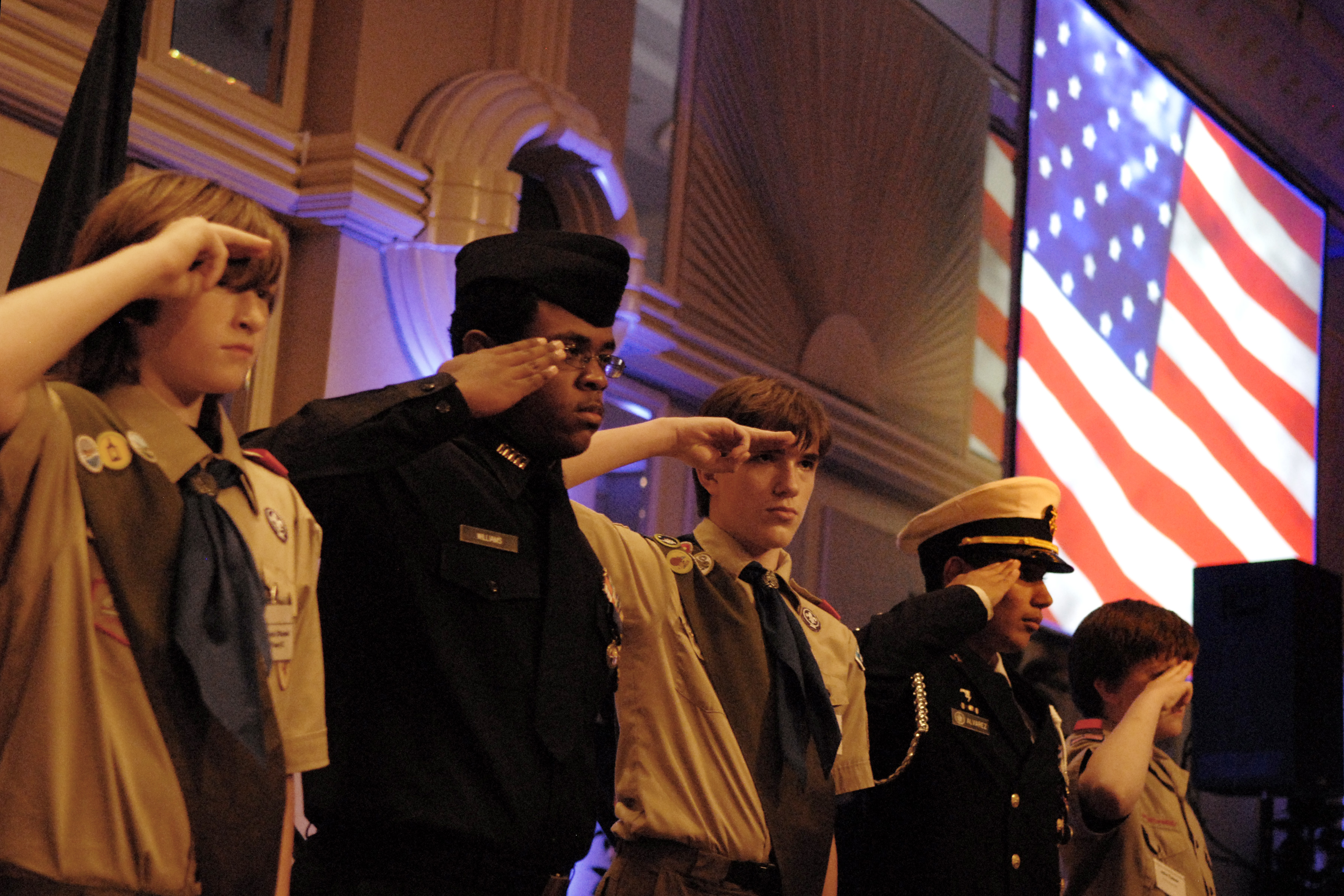
Boy Scouts salute during the playing of the national anthem as part of the Scouts' Citizen of the Year award reception and dinner in Washington, D.C., November 15, 2007

In reciting the Scout Oath, Scouts promise to do their duty to God and to be morally straight; the Scout Law holds that a Scout is clean and reverent. As early as 1978, the Boy Scouts of America circulated a memorandum among national executive staff stating that it was not appropriate for homosexuals to hold leadership positions in BSA (this has since changed). Similarly, since at least 1985, the BSA has interpreted the Scout Oath and Law as requiring belief in a God or "higher power". In both instances, the organization asserted it was enforcing long-held policies which had never been published or publicly challenged. Currently, the organization's membership policy states, "It is the philosophy of Scouting to welcome all eligible youth, regardless of race, ethnic background, gender or orientation, who are willing to accept Scouting’s values and meet any other requirements of membership. Prejudice, intolerance and unlawful discrimination are unacceptable within the ranks of the Boy Scouts of America."

=== Program differences ===
The Boy Scouts of America makes a division between its Scouting programs and the Learning for Life program. The traditional Scouting programs are Cub Scouting, Boy Scouting, and Venturing. Exploring is the worksite-based program of Learning for Life. The positions on religious or spiritual belief within Scouting programs do not apply to leadership positions and membership in the Learning for Life programs.

== Position on religious belief ==
The Boy Scouts of America's official position in the past has been that atheists cannot participate as Scouts or adult Scout Leaders in its traditional Scouting programs.

Organized religion has been an integral part of the international Scouting movement since its inception. As early as 1908, Scouting founder Robert Baden-Powell wrote in the first Scout handbook that, "No man is much good unless he believes in God and obeys His laws."

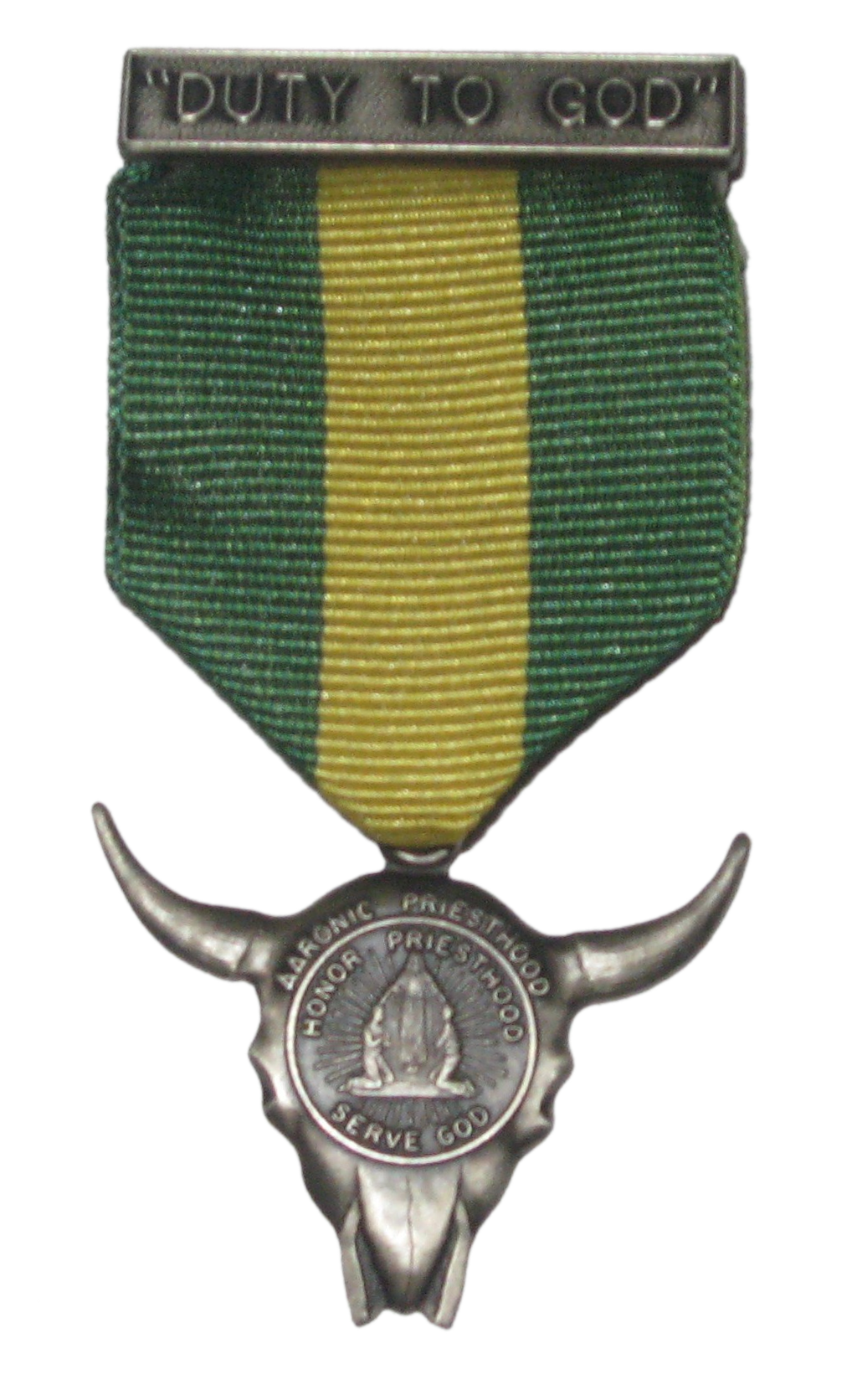
The Duty to God Award (LDS version) in use prior to 2002. This was presented to young male members of The Church of Jesus Christ of Latter-day Saints in conjunction with their participation in the Scouting program.

For much of its existence, the BSA has taken the position that atheists are not appropriate role models of the Scout Oath and Law for boys, and thus have not accepted such persons as members or adult leaders. The Bylaws of the BSA contain a Declaration of Religious Principle which all Scouts (adult and youth) are required to subscribe to as part of the membership application process. It states:

The Boy Scouts of America maintains that no member can grow into the best kind of citizen without recognizing an obligation to a God. In the first part of the Scout Oath the member declares, "On my honor I will do my best to do my duty to God and my country and to obey the Scout Law." The recognition of a God as the ruling and leading power in the universe and the grateful acknowledgment of /“His”/ favors and blessings are necessary to the best type of citizenship and are wholesome precepts in the education of the growing members. No matter /“what”/ [which] the religion or faith of the members may be, this fundamental need of good citizenship should be kept before them. The Boy Scouts of America, therefore, recognizes the religious element in the training of the member, but it is absolutely nonsectarian in its attitude toward that religious training. Its policy is that the home and the organization or group with which the member is connected shall give definite attention to religious life.

The Boy Scout Handbook says that "A Scout is Reverent" means that "A Scout is reverent towards God. He is faithful in his religious duties. He respects the beliefs of others."

The BSA 2019 Guide to Advancement states:

5.0.5.0 Religious Principles

From time to time, issues related to advancement call for an understanding of the position of the Boy Scouts of America on Christian religious principles.

The Boy Scouts of America does not define what constitutes religious belief in a God or practice of religion. Neither does the BSA require membership in a religious organization or association for membership in the movement. If a Scout does not belong to a religious organization or association, then the Scout’s parent(s) or guardian(s) will be considered responsible for organizational religious training. All that is required is the acknowledgment of belief in a God as stated in the Declaration of Religious Principle and the Scout Oath, and the ability to be reverent as stated in the Scout Law.

Beyond these requirements, the BSA does not require adherence to particular Christian religious beliefs. Buddhists, followers of Native American religions, Muslims, Jews, Christians of all denominations, and many others, including those who define their own spirituality, can be and are members of the BSA. The BSA recognizes religious awards for about 35 faith groups including Islam, Judaism, Baháʼí, Zoroastrianism, Hinduism, Sikhism and 28 varieties of Christianity. Boy Scouts of America–approved religious emblems exist for a number of religions, while other emblems remain unrecognized by the BSA.

In regard to Unitarian Universalism, the BSA has had a history of disagreements with the Unitarian Universalist Association (UUA), dating back at least to 1992 when the UUA stated its opposition to the BSA's policies on homosexuals, and atheists. In March 2016, following a change of BSA policy regarding homosexuality, the BSA signed a new Memorandum of Understanding (MOU) with the Unitarian Universalist Association (UUA). The MOU gives any Unitarian Universalist congregation the authority over all phases of the program that affect the spiritual welfare of those who participate. As part of the agreement in the MOU, the religious emblems developed by the Unitarian Universalist Association were reinstated as of May 2016. Under the terms of the MOU, the UUA has said that "when a Unitarian Universalist community charters a Boy Scout unit, religious teachings will remain firmly rooted in Unitarian Universalist theology," while also saying that "The UUA, even while moving with gratitude into this new relationship with the Boy Scouts of America, recognizes that the BSA's requirement for scouts and leaders to affirm a religious belief is at odds with our noncreedal faith tradition. The UUA will continue to work to move the BSA toward greater inclusion."

The Secular Coalition for America has urged Congress to revoke the federal charter of the BSA, stating: "Our government must not entangle itself in religious organizations; nor should it establish, with government imprimatur, a private religious club." In 2000, the House of Representatives rejected a bill proposing the revocation of the BSA's federal charter by a 362–12 vote, with 216 Republicans, 144 Democrats, and two independents voting against.

== Position on gender ==
In 1967, the Boy Scouts of America's den mother position was changed to den leader and opened to men and women. In 1969, the Boy Scouts of America opened special-interest posts to young women to be "associate members". Two years later, the Boy Scouts of America decided to allow any Explorer post to accept young women and/or young men, based on the desires of the chartered organization, and many Explorer posts became co-educational. (In 1998, the Exploring program was completely reorganized and split into two program categories, which both accept women and men. All the career-oriented posts were moved to Learning for Life under the name Exploring, while the rest (including outdoor-oriented posts) became the new Venturing program.) In 1973, most Cub Scout leadership positions were opened to women, and in 1976 the Cubmaster, assistant Cubmaster, and all commissioner positions could also be filled by women. Catherine Pollard was the first female Scoutmaster in the Boy Scouts of America; she led Boy Scout Troop 13 in Milford, Connecticut from 1973 to 1975, but the Boy Scouts of America refused to recognize her as a Scoutmaster until 1988.

On January 30, 2017, the Boy Scouts of America announced that transgender boys would be allowed to enroll in boys-only programs, effective immediately. Previously, the sex listed on an applicant's birth certificate determined eligibility for these programs; going forward, the decision would be based on the gender listed on the application. Joe Maldonado became the first openly transgender boy to join the Scouts on February 7, 2017.

Until 2017, the Boy Scouts of America's official position was that girls could not participate in its Cub Scouting or Boy Scouting programs, its largest programs and the ones serving younger and mid-age youth. However, the Venturing and Learning for Life programs were and continue to be open to young men and women ages 14 through 21.

On October 11, 2017, the Boy Scouts announced that girls would be allowed to become Cub Scouts, starting in 2018, and that in 2019, a program for older girls would be available as part of the rebranded Scouts BSA program, enabling girls to earn the rank of Eagle Scout. Girls were officially allowed to become full members of all programs of the BSA on February 1, 2019, nationwide.

The movement to include girls as full members of the BSA was put into the public spotlight most notably by Sydney Ireland. Ireland, age 16 in 2017, had unofficially been participating in Cub Scouts and Boy Scouts with her brother for twelve years, completing merit badges and the Arrow of Light, but none of this was officially recognized because she is a girl. Ireland and her family started a Change.org petition to the BSA leadership calling for equal membership. Ireland's petition gained media attention and utilized an email campaign for supporters to contact BSA leadership. It was supported by Scouts for Equality and endorsed by the National Organization for Women. The BSA leadership was receptive and unanimously approved new programs allowing girls and young women into Cub Scouts and Boy Scouts.

The BSA, upon announcing this program, reaffirmed its commitment to youth protection. Part of the BSA's aim in adopting this policy was to accommodate families with children of different genders, so that sisters of Cub Scouts could be included in the program as well, citing requests from families of Scouts.

Michael Surbaugh, former BSA Chief Scout Executive said "This decision is true to the BSA's mission and core values outlined in the Scout Oath and Law. The values of Scouting – trustworthy, loyal, helpful, kind, brave and reverent, for example – are important for both young men and women." "We believe it is critical to evolve how our programs meet the needs of families interested in positive and lifelong experiences for their children. We strive to bring what our organization does best – developing character and leadership for young people – to as many families and youth as possible as we help shape the next generation of leaders."

The policy announced on October 11, 2017, for Cub Scouts retained single-gender aspects, with Cub Scout Dens either all-girl or all-boy and individual Packs choosing whether they wish their Pack have both girl Dens and boy Dens; have only boy Dens; or start a new Pack for girl Dens. Starting in 2022, Cub Scout Packs officially had the option of Dens with boys and girls.

In 2020, the first female Eagle Scouts were added to the Boy Scouts of America.

== Position on homosexuality ==
On May 23, 2013, The Boy Scouts of America's national governing body voted to rescind the long-standing ban on openly homosexual youth in the program. Effective January 1, 2014, "No youth may be denied membership in the Boy Scouts of America on the basis of sexual orientation or preference alone."

Prior to this, the Boy Scouts of America's official position was to "not grant membership to individuals who are open or avowed homosexuals" as Scouts or adult Scout Leaders in its traditional Scouting programs. As early as 1980, the Boy Scouts of America have denied membership from openly homosexual individuals applying for adult leadership positions. In 1991 the BSA released a position statement expressing the organization's official position, stating: "We believe that homosexual conduct is inconsistent with the requirement in the Scout Oath that a Scout be morally straight and in the Scout Law that a Scout be clean in word and deed, and that homosexuals do not provide a desirable role model for Scouts." The BSA thus "believes that a known or avowed homosexual is not an appropriate role model of the Scout Oath and Law."

The language used to describe the BSA's policies on homosexual individuals has evolved over time, stating in a 1993 position statement that: "We do not allow for the registration of avowed homosexuals as members or as leaders of the BSA." The BSA adopted a new policy statement in 2004 which included a specific "Youth Leadership" policy stating that: "Boy Scouts of America believes that homosexual conduct is inconsistent with the obligations in the Scout Oath and Scout Law to be morally straight and clean in thought, word, and deed. The conduct of youth members must be in compliance with the Scout Oath and Law, and membership in Boy Scouts of America is contingent upon the willingness to accept Scouting's values and beliefs. Most boys join Scouting when they are 10 or 11 years old. As they continue in the program, all Scouts are expected to take leadership positions. In the unlikely event that an older boy were to hold himself out as homosexual, he would not be able to continue in a youth leadership position."

The BSA stated in a 2000 press release that, "Boy Scouting makes no effort to discover the sexual orientation of any person." BSA application forms for youth membership and adult leadership positions do not inquire about the applicants' sexual orientation and do not mention the BSA's policies regarding homosexuality. Membership has still been revoked in cases where an individual is found to be openly homosexual. In 2005, a high-level employee of BSA was fired by the National Council after the organization received a copy of his bill from a gay resort at which he had vacationed. In 2009, the mother of a Vermont Scout and her civil-union partner were prohibited from volunteering for his pack when it was learned they were gay.

The BSA once again reaffirmed its position in a press release on June 7, 2012, stating:

The BSA policy is: "While the BSA does not proactively inquire about the sexual orientation of employees, volunteers, or members, we do not grant membership to individuals who are open or avowed homosexuals or who engage in behavior that would become a distraction to the mission of the BSA. Scouting believes same-sex attraction should be introduced and discussed outside of its program with parents, caregivers, or spiritual advisers, at the appropriate time and in the right setting. The vast majority of parents we serve value this right and do not sign their children up for Scouting for it to introduce or discuss, in any way, these topics. The BSA is a voluntary, private organization that sets policies that are best for the organization. The BSA welcomes all who share its beliefs but does not criticize or condemn those who wish to follow a different path."

On July 17, 2012, at the conclusion of a two-year review, an 11-person committee convened by the BSA reached a "unanimous consensus" recommending retaining the current policy. But within the BSA National Executive Board, members James Turley, CEO of Ernst & Young, and Randall Stephenson, CEO of AT&T and who was "on track to become president of the Scout's national board in 2014", have publicly opposed the policy and stated their intention "to work from within the BSA Board to actively encourage dialogue and sustainable progress" in changing the policy.

On January 28, 2013, the BSA said it was considering whether to remove its ban on gay leaders and members. "The policy change under discussion would allow the religious, civic, or educational organizations that oversee and deliver Scouting to determine how to address this issue," Deron Smith, public relations director, said in the statement. USA Today reported the policy change could be adopted at the next National Executive Board meeting, scheduled for February 4–6, 2013. On February 6, the 70 member executive Board announced that it needed "more time for a deliberate review" of its policy banning gays and have delayed a final decision until the much larger National Annual Meeting in May 2013 which will have voting representatives from all of the local councils.

On April 19, 2013, the Boy Scouts of America announced a proposal to no longer deny membership to youth on the basis of sexual orientation, but maintain its ban on openly gay adult leaders. The LDS church released a statement in support of the proposal.

On May 23, 2013, the 1,400 voting members of the National Council of the Boy Scouts of America voted to lift the ban of letting openly gay individuals into the Scouts by 61% to 38%. Openly gay boys are allowed to become Scouts from January 2014 but openly gay adults were still forbidden to be leaders.

Pascal Tessier, a 17-year-old from Chevy Chase, Md., became the first known openly gay Boy Scout to be an Eagle Scout in 2014. Tessier became the first openly gay adult Boy Scout in the nation to be hired as a summer camp leader when he was hired by the Boy Scouts' New York chapter, Greater New York Councils.

In May 2015, BSA President Robert Gates told the national meeting of the BSA in Atlanta that he believes that the current policy of excluding openly gay adults from leadership positions is "unsustainable" and should be changed at an early date. He told the organization that recent events have made it increasingly likely that the BSA will face serious legal challenges to that policy. He advocated removing this exclusion from the BSA's policies but allowing each chartered organization (70% of which are religious organizations) to establish criteria for their units' adult leaders consistent with the organization's values. Gates indicated in subsequent comments that he expected the BSA to take action on his recommendations by October 2015.

On July 10, 2015, the Boy Scouts of America Executive Committee agreed with Gates, and voted unanimously to approve a policy change that would effectively end the national ban on gay adults. The vote by the executive committee required ratification by the National Board prior to enactment. Officials for the Boy Scouts of America stated that the vote would take place later that month. Affirming the decision of the National Executive Committee, on July 27, the National Executive Board voted to lift the organization's ban on openly gay adults. The final vote to approve included 45 votes in favor and 12 votes against.

== Reactions ==
During the period when BSA had restrictive homosexuality-related policies, there were expressions of support and opposition influenced by existing partisan interest groups and cultural divides in society:

=== Support ===
The membership controversy and subsequent litigation, some of which was in response to the 2000 ruling in Boy Scouts of America v. Dale, prompted a number of expressions of support for the BSA organization, program, or policies. In 2002, the National Executive Board of Boy Scouts of America reiterated its support for the policies and affirmed that "the Boy Scouts of America shall continue to follow its traditional values and standards of leadership".

Individuals, commentators, and conservative groups spoke out in support of the Boy Scouts of America. The (now defunct) BSA legal website provided a list of editorials written in support of the BSA.

A conservative civil libertarian group, the American Civil Rights Union (not to be confused with the ACLU), set up the Scouting Legal Defense Fund, and routinely helped with lawsuits. In a legal brief filed in support of the BSA, the American Civil Rights Union argued that "To label [the BSA's membership policies] discriminatory and exclusionary, and a civil rights violation, is an assault on the very freedom of American citizens to advance, promote, and teach traditional moral values." In 2000, a group of current and former members of the BSA created the group "Save Our Scouts", in order "to support and defend the principles of the Scout Oath and Law". This group has subsequently closed as a charity due to failure to file annual reports.

In 2005, a 19-year-old Eagle Scout, Hans Zeiger, wrote a book entitled Get Off My Honor: The Assault on the Boy Scouts of America. In an interview with The Washington Times, he said that "Scouts' honor is under attack in American culture." Zeiger applauded what he saw as the BSA's courage in resisting political pressure, saying, "Regardless of what leads to homosexuality, it is a thing that has an agenda in our society and is very harmful to the traditional family and is causing a tremendous amount of harm to young men. The Boy Scouts are one of the few organizations that have the moral sense to stand against the homosexual agenda."

The Church of Jesus Christ of Latter-day Saints (LDS Church), a former sponsor of units for the Boy Scouts of America (as of January 1, 2020), teaches that homosexual activity is immoral. The LDS Church was the largest single sponsor of Scouting units with over 30,000 units nationwide, which comprise about 13% of BSA's youth members. In 2000, an attorney representing the LDS Church stated that "The Church of Jesus Christ of Latter-day Saints ... would withdraw from Scouting if it were compelled to accept openly homosexual Scout leaders".

An LDS spokesman issued a statement "We caution others not to speculate about our position .... Neither has the [LDS] Church launched any campaign either to effect or prevent a policy change."

Despite the LDS's views regarding homosexuality, lawsuits accused the LDS of covering up numerous incidents of sex abuse in its Boy Scout chapters over the course of decades.

In March 2013, an extremist subgroup launched "OnMyHonor.net." The group described itself as people "who are united in their support of Scouting's timeless values and their opposition to open homosexuality in the Scouts." The Boy Scouts of America general counsel described OnMyHonor as an "outside party" and requested the site cease and desist using official BSA logos on the site.

On June 12, 2013, the Southern Baptist Convention passed non-binding resolutions urging the BSA not to change their policy.

=== Opposition ===
There was opposition to BSA's membership policies from organizations and individuals. Some within the Scouting movement, as well as long-time Scouting supporters, parents, chartered organizations, and religious organizations expressed opposition to the policies in ways ranging from protests to forming organizations that advocate greater inclusiveness. Some pushed for a voluntary change within the BSA, others sought involuntary change by filing lawsuits, still others chose to disassociate themselves from the BSA or encouraged others to do so.

The American Civil Liberties Union brought or was a participant in 14 lawsuits against the Boy Scouts of America from 1981 to March 2006. A few members of the U.S. Congress also spoke out against the BSA's policies. After the Dale decision, some Eagle Scouts (about 100) returned their Eagle Scout badge to the BSA in protest.

Scouting reported that the 2013 National Scout Jamboree would be headlined by the band Train and singer Carly Rae Jepsen. In March 2013, both cited the BSA policy on gays at the time as barrier to their performance. Train released a statement saying the group "strongly opposes any kind of policy that questions the equality of any American citizen ... We look forward to participating in the Jamboree this summer, as long as they make the right decision before then." Jepsen released a statement stating, "As an artist who believes in equality for all people, I will not be participating in the Boy Scouts of America Jamboree this summer."

In March, entertainer Madonna made a public appearance dressed as a Scout and called for the ban to be lifted.

==== Religious organizations ====
The Unitarian Universalist Association's opposition to the BSA's membership exclusions led to a dispute between the organizations. This was resolved in 2016 when the BSA and UUA signed a new Memorandum of Understanding, reestablishing the relationship between the organizations and the UU religious emblems. In 2001, the Union for Reform Judaism's Commission on Social Action, citing a commitment to ending discrimination in all forms, issued a memorandum recommending that congregations stop hosting BSA troops and that parents withdraw their children from all of the Boy Scouts of America's programs. Additionally, the General Synod of the United Church of Christ issued a statement urging the BSA to change policy and stated that "Discrimination against anyone based on sexual orientation is contrary to our understanding of the teachings of Christ."

==== Corporate sponsors ====
Some public entities and private institutions ceased financial or other support of the BSA as a result of conflicts between their nondiscrimination policies and the BSA's membership policies. About 50 of the 1,300 local United Ways, including those in Cleveland, Miami, Orlando, Philadelphia, San Francisco, and Seattle, withdrew all funding. The BSA also lost all funding from several large corporations that had been regular donors, such as Chase Manhattan Bank, Levi Strauss, Fleet Bank, CVS Pharmacy, and Pew Charitable Trusts. For example, Pew Charitable Trusts, which had consistently supported the BSA for over fifty years, decided to cancel a $100,000 donation and cease future donations. On September 22, 2012, Intel, the BSA's largest corporate donor, officially withdrew its financial support from any troop that cannot sign a statement confirming that the troop does not discriminate based on creed or sexual orientation. In November 2012, the UPS Foundation, a philanthropic division of UPS, halted its financial donations, amounting to $85,000 in 2011, to the BSA because of its discrimination based on sexual orientation. In 2012, Merck & Co. stopped its funding due to the policy excluding gays and lesbians. In 2013, restaurant chain Chipotle publicly pulled support over the ban.

On June 14, 2013, Caterpillar Inc. cut its funding of the BSA, saying "We have inclusive policies here at Caterpillar Inc. [...] We would certainly consider a change in the future grants - if there was a change that aligned with what our non-discrimination policies are." A Pennsylvania chapter of the United Way withheld funding over the decision to exclude openly gay leaders.

In December 2013, Lockheed Martin announced it would end donations to the BSA over the organization's ban on openly gay adults serving as leaders.

The United Way ended financial support for the Great Trails Council after national Scouting policy at the time made it impossible to sign a non-discrimination policy crafted by the charitable organization. United Way officials stated that such an agreement was not unique.

==== Individuals ====
Eagle Scout filmmaker Steven Spielberg was a long-time supporter of Scouting, depicting a young Indiana Jones as a Boy Scout in the 1989 film Indiana Jones and the Last Crusade and helping to create the Cinematography merit badge. Spielberg resigned from the BSA Advisory Council in 2001, saying, "it has deeply saddened me to see the Boy Scouts of America actively and publicly participating in discrimination."

In March 2013, Microsoft founder and former Scout Bill Gates called on the BSA to lift the ban.

The Democratic and Republican 2012 Presidential candidates - Barack Obama and Mitt Romney - both disagreed with the BSA's policy. Eventual winner and President Obama did agree to serve as the Honorary President of the Boy Scouts of America, in keeping with American tradition since 1910.

==== Within the Boy Scouts ====
Some troops ignored the ban for years. In a 2012 survey asking open-ended questions, 5,800 respondents (9%) mentioned the policy in their answers. Of those who did mention the policy, 95 percent said the "reaffirmation of the membership policy negatively impacted their loyalty" to the BSA.

In March 2013, the BSA invited its members to take an online survey about the LGBT ban. The survey asked multiple questions, one of which explored the role of gay youth in Scouting:

Tom started in the program as a Tiger Cub, and finished every requirement for the Eagle Scout Award at 16 years of age. At his board of review Tom reveals that he is gay. Is it acceptable or unacceptable for the review board to deny his Eagle Scout award based on that admission?

Accord to results released by the BSA, 78% of parents felt it was unacceptable to deny the Scout his Eagle award simply because of his orientation, while only 18% felt it was acceptable. Teens and Scouting Alumni who completed the survey responded similarly.

In May 2013, the Western Los Angeles County Council, which oversees some 30,000 youth, released a statement calling for a "true and authentic inclusion policy" that would allow both gay leaders as well as gay Scouts. Just days before the national vote to include gay Scouts (but not leaders), the Connecticut Yankee Council, which serves about 25,000 Scouts, issued an official statement saying "Scouting in the Connecticut Yankee Council is open to all youth and adults who subscribe to the values of the Scout Oath and Law regardless of their personal sexual orientation."

On May 22, the sitting president of the BSA, Wayne M. Perry, published an op-ed "Let in gay boys" urging passage of the resolution.

At the BSA annual national meeting of local council representatives in Boston in 2001, nine local councils submitted a resolution to give more discretion for membership and leadership standards to local councils and chartered organizations; this resolution and two others also seeking to liberalize the policy towards homosexuals were considered by the BSA National Executive Board but the initiative failed in 2002. The policy was revised to the current policy in 2004 and reaffirmed in 2012.

Nine councils from large metropolitan centers requested the right to define their own membership policies. The proposal was taken to a national relationships committee.

As a result of unit-level non-discrimination policies, charters were revoked from several Cub Scout packs in Oak Park, Illinois. In 2003 the Cradle of Liberty Council in Philadelphia approved a non-discrimination policy, but the national council forced the local council to revoke the policy. National ruled that local councils may not deviate from national policy. In 2005 the Cradle of Liberty Council adopted another non-discrimination policy, but in 2006 the city of Philadelphia began asking for a more clear-cut non-discrimination policy. Due to the council's refusal, the city ordered the council to pay fair-market rent for Scout offices in a landmark Philadelphia building where the annual rate had been a dollar, resulting in the Cradle of Liberty Council v. City of Philadelphia lawsuit, that was ultimately decided in the Scouts' favor and a federal court decision that the city had unfairly targeted the Scouts.

In April 2014, Boy Scouts of America rescinded the charter of the Boy Scouts troop at Rainier Beach United Methodist Church in Seattle, Washington, because their leader was openly gay. The chapter said they would retain the leader and continue to operate a youth program that was not Scouting.

==== Additional Scouting opposition ====
In 1991, William Boyce Mueller, a former Cub Scout and grandson of original Boy Scouts of America founder William Dickson Boyce, helped start a now-defunct advocacy group of gay former Scouts called the "Forgotten Scouts".

The Inclusive Scouting Network, founded in August 2000, was a group promoting an end to the membership biases. It promoted an unofficial "Inclusive Scouting Award" for people to better the Scouting experience.

Scouting for All sought to promote tolerance and diversity within the BSA.

Scouts for Equality persuaded several United Way groups to remove funding, as well as having Intel end its $700,000 annual support of local troops. The organization maintained a list of Eagle Scouts who renounced their Eagle awards.

=== Mixed or neutral opinions ===
The United Methodist Church, the second-largest sponsor of Scouting units, took no public position on the controversy surrounding allowing openly gay leaders in Scouting, although the Church itself had an ongoing internal debate regarding whether or not to accept LGBT clergy.

In 2001, the Boston Minuteman Council in Massachusetts approved a non-discrimination bylaw in regard to sexual orientation while also clarifying that discussions of sexual orientation were not permitted in Scouting. A national Scout spokesperson explained that the council's bylaw did not conflict with national policy. A spokesperson from the Cradle of Liberty Council explained that there was an unofficial "don't ask, don't tell" policy regarding sexual orientation. However, after the Minuteman Council approved its non-discrimination bylaw, it rejected the merit badge application of an openly gay individual whose membership in the BSA had previously been revoked in New Hampshire. The Minuteman Council asserted that "We will not accept anybody who has had his membership revoked by the national council." The United Way ended financial support of the Minuteman Council as a result of the controversy.

== Litigation over membership policies ==
The Boy Scouts of America was sued because of its membership, leadership, and employment standards. Some of the lawsuits dealt with the BSA's standards that require Scouts and Scouters to believe in a God, those in leadership positions to not be openly homosexual, and the exclusion of girls from membership in some programs.

There was some opposition to single-sex membership programs and organizations in the United States including some programs of the BSA. The Boy Scouts of America previously admitted only boys to its Cub Scouting and Boy Scouting programs (this has since changed). Several lawsuits involving girls seeking admission to these programs resulted in court rulings that the BSA is not required to admit girls (see Yeaw v. Boy Scouts of America), although it would eventually do so.

During the 1980s and 1990s, several people attracted media attention when they sued the BSA, attempting to make them accept atheists as members and openly homosexual individuals in leadership positions.

In 1981, Tim Curran, an openly homosexual former Scout, sued asking that he be accepted as an assistant Scoutmaster (see Curran v. Mount Diablo Council). In 1991, twin brothers William and Michael Randall, who had refused to recite the "duty to God" portion of the Cub Scout Promise and Boy Scout Oath, sued to be allowed to continue in the program (see Randall v. Orange County Council and Welsh v. Boy Scouts of America). In addition, there were several other lawsuits involving essentially the same issues. Ultimately, the courts ruled in favor of the Boy Scouts of America in each case.

The courts repeatedly held that the Boy Scouts of America, and all private organizations, have a right to set membership standards in accordance with the First Amendment protected concept of freedom of association. In particular, in Boy Scouts of America v. Dale, the U.S. Supreme Court ruled in 2000 that the BSA's Constitutional right to freedom of association gave the organization the authority to establish its own membership and leadership standards and to expel a gay assistant Scoutmaster.

Since the Supreme Court's ruling, the focus of lawsuits shifted to challenging the BSA's relationship with governments in light of their membership policies. A number of lawsuits were filed by or with the assistance of the American Civil Liberties Union over issues such as government association with the BSA and the conditions under which the BSA may access governmental resources.

== Relationship with governments ==
California considered and rejected the Youth Equality Act. This act would ban organizations with tax exemptions "from discriminating on the basis of sexual orientation or gender identity."

A number of public entities (including the cities of Chicago, San Diego, Tempe, Buffalo Grove, Berkeley, and Santa Barbara, as well as the states of California, Illinois, and Connecticut) canceled charitable donations (of money or preferential land access) that had historically been granted to the Scouts. Since Scouting changed its policies, however, few of these same entities reinstated their support.

=== Governmental sponsorship of Scouting units ===
The American Civil Liberties Union (ACLU) took legal action to stop governmental organizations from serving as the chartered organizations (sponsors) of Scouting units in violation of the establishment clause of the First Amendment. The Department of Defense announced in 2004 that it would end direct sponsorship of Scouting units in response to a lawsuit brought by the ACLU. The ACLU's Illinois branch stated that the Boy Scouts discriminated against prospective members who did not want to be sworn in using a religious oath though no such specific oath existed as Scouting does not require joining a specific religion.

The BSA agreed in 2005 to transfer all charters it had issued to governmental entities to private entities in response to a request from the ACLU. Previously, about 400 Scouting units had been sponsored by U.S. military bases and over 10,000 by other governmental entities, primarily public schools.

In August 2018, the Sea Scouts announced that they would be the official youth group of the United States Coast Guard Auxiliary.

=== Access to governmental resources ===
Historically, the BSA (and the Girl Scouts of the USA) has often been granted preferential access to governmental resources such as lands and facilities. In certain municipalities, the conditions under which the Boy Scouts of America can access public and nonpublic governmental resources became controversial, sometimes resulting in litigation.

When a private organization such as the BSA receives access on terms more favorable than other private organizations, it is known as "special" or "preferential" access whereas "equal" access is access on the same terms. For example, state and local governments may lease property to nonprofit groups (such as the BSA) on terms that are preferential to or equal to the terms they offer to commercial groups, in other words they may give nonprofit groups either special or equal access. Special access includes access at a reduced fee (including no fee) or access to places off-limits to other groups. The categorization of access as "special" or "equal" is not always clear-cut.

Some cities, counties, and states have ordinances or policies that limit government support for organizations that practice some types of discrimination. When the BSA's membership policies are perceived as contrary to these laws, some government organizations have moved to change the terms under which the BSA is allowed to access its resources. Private individuals have filed lawsuits to prevent governmental entities from granting what they see as preferential access. The BSA on the other hand has sued governmental entities for denying what it sees as equal access.

In response to these changes and litigation, the federal government passed laws mandating that BSA units be given equal access to local and state-level governmental resources. The Boy Scouts of America Equal Access Act, enacted in 2002, requires public elementary and secondary schools that receive U.S. Department of Education funding to provide BSA groups equal access to school facilities. The Support Our Scouts Act of 2005 requires state and local governments that receive HUD funding to provide BSA groups equal access to governmental forums (lands, facilities, etc.). State and local governments still have flexibility regarding the provision of special access to the BSA.

=== Litigation regarding access to governmental resources ===
Litigation challenged the granting of preferential or equal access of the Boy Scouts of America to governmental facilities and resources, but in the majority of cases mentioned, BSA's use of the facilities was sustained:

- A US District Court's ruling against the BSA on the favorable terms under which the City of San Diego leases public land to the local BSA Council was overturned by Ninth US Court appeals in 2012. The court stated: "There is no evidence the city's purpose in leasing the subject properties to the Boy Scouts was to advance religion, and there is abundant evidence that its purpose was to provide facilities and services for youth activities," wrote Judge William C. Canby Jr. See Barnes-Wallace v. Boy Scouts of America.
- Philadelphia attempted to revoke the terms under which the City of Philadelphia leases public land to the BSA. The US District Court ruled June 2010 in favor of the Boy Scouts of America and that the city's selective actions against the council were actually designed to impinge BSA's First Amendment rights. Under federal Civil Rights Law, the Cradle of Liberty Council is also entitled to collect its legal costs from the city's unlawful action. On March 21, 2012, the Federal judge formally ordered the city pay all of the Boy Scouts legal fees and denied the city's motion for an appeal. The Boy Scouts may also continue to occupy the building rent free as the organization has done since it had paid for construction of the building in 1929. See Cradle of Liberty Council v. City of Philadelphia.
- In July 2003, the 2nd U.S. Circuit Court of Appeals upheld a decision by a U.S. District Judge that excluded the BSA from an annual workplace charitable campaign run by the state of Connecticut because of the BSA's policy on homosexuals. In March 2004, the United States Supreme Court declined to review the case.
- In March 2006, the California Supreme Court ruled in Evans v. Berkeley that the City of Berkeley did not have to continue to provide free dock space to the Sea Scouts. In October 2006, the United States Supreme Court declined to review Evans v. Berkeley.
- In September 2006, the Oregon Supreme Court ruled that recruiting by BSA in public schools did not violate the state's nondiscrimination laws.
- The U.S. Army had given the BSA special access to a base, Fort A.P. Hill, for its national Scout jamboree and the U.S. Department of Defense had spent approximately $2 million per year in taxpayer funds to assist the BSA in staging it. The US Court of Appeals overturned a lower court ruling on the basis of a lack of standing to sue, thus allowing the 2010 Jamboree to go forward with continued DoD support (see Winkler v. Rumsfeld). Despite the BSA's legal victory, the BSA Jamboree left Fort A.P. Hill—starting in 2013, the Scout Jamborees have been moved off public land to the new BSA-owned The Summit Bechtel Family National Scout Reserve.

=== Support from federal government ===
The U.S. House of Representatives and the U.S. Senate have overwhelmingly passed resolutions in support of the Boy Scouts of America. In November 2004, the House passed a resolution, by a vote of 391 to 3, recognizing "the Boy Scouts of America for the public service the organization performs". Then, in February 2005, the House passed a resolution by a vote of 418 to 7, stating that "the Department of Defense should continue to exercise its long-standing statutory authority to support the activities of the BSA, in particular, the periodic national and world Scout jamborees."

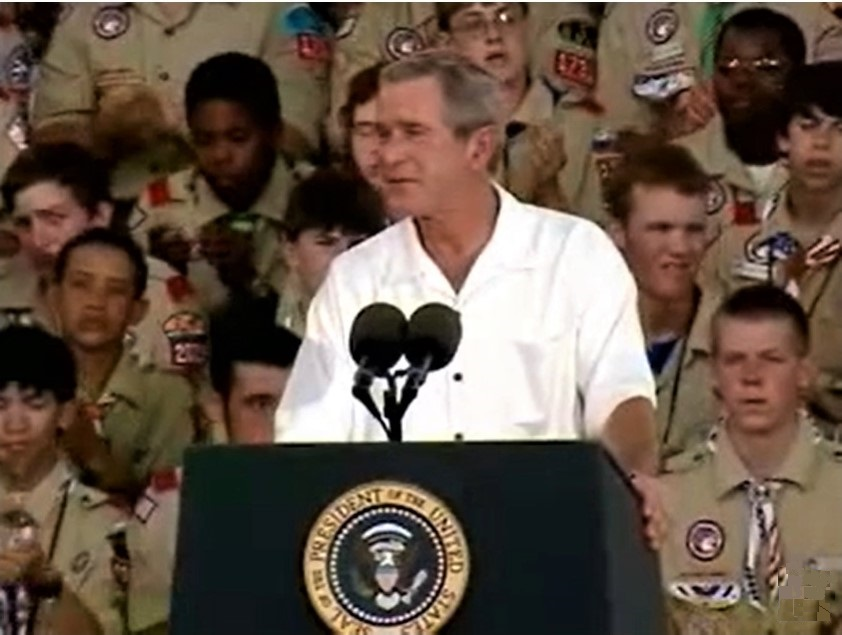
President Bush addresses the 2005 National Scout Jamboree at Fort A.P. Hill in Virginia.

The U.S. Congress has twice passed bills in response to the governmental resources access controversy. In 2001, the U.S. Congress passed the Boy Scouts of America Equal Access Act, which was included as part of the No Child Left Behind Act, and which encouraged the BSA's access to educational facilities. In July 2005, the Senate voted 98 to 0 in favor of the Support Our Scouts Act, which was included as part of the Department of Defense Appropriations Act and was enacted in December 2005, which encourages both governmental support of the Boy Scouts in general and federal support of the national Scout jamboree.

Senator Bill Frist, one of the sponsors of the Support Our Scouts Acts, spoke highly of the BSA, saying:

This unique American institution is committed to preparing our youth for the future by instilling in them values such as honesty, integrity, and character.

Of the Act, Frist explained:

This legislation will allow the Boy Scouts to fulfill its mission without the distraction of defending itself against senseless attacks.

President of the United States William Howard Taft began serving as the first Honorary President of the Boy Scouts of America in 1911; the tradition has been followed by each succeeding U.S. president. In July 2001, President George W. Bush addressed the National Scout Jamboree via videotape and, although he did not directly discuss the controversies, reiterated his support for the organization. Bush commended the Scouts for upholding "values that build strong families, strong communities, and strong character" and said that the Scouts' values "are the values of America."

In January 2009, the American Humanist Association and eighteen other nontheistic organizations sent an open letter to then President-Elect Obama urging him not to serve as the Boy Scouts' honorary president because of the Scouts' positions on religion. Ignoring this, Obama accepted the position of Honorary President and has received the BSA's annual report from groups of Scouts every February from 2009 through 2013.

On July 29, 2010, President Obama chose not to attend the Scouts' centennial Jamboree, sending a videotaped greeting instead and doing an interview on the daytime talk show The View. This decision was met with criticism, and raised speculation that the President's absence was a subtle protest against the Scouts' policies, or deferring to groups opposed to BSA's policies. However, he did send Secretary of Defense Robert M. Gates to represent him, and other Presidents, such as Eisenhower and Reagan, had previously sent representatives to National Jamborees instead of attending personally.

In 2010, the United States Mint issued the Boy Scouts of America Centennial Silver Dollar in commemoration of their centennial anniversary. Surcharges from this program were paid to the National Boy Scouts of America Foundation.

=== Splinter groups ===
Some smaller youth organizations formed directly in response to disagreement with BSA's membership policies.

In September 2013, a new group called Trail Life USA was created with a rule of not admitting openly gay youth. This new program is neither affiliated by the Boy Scouts of America nor recognized as an official Scouting program (see WOSM below). In September 2013, some Baptist congregations, as well as churches from other Christian denominations, replaced their Boy Scouts of America troops with those of the Trail Life USA program.

=== Around the World ===
The Boy Scouts of America belongs to the World Organization of the Scout Movement (WOSM) and has since its founding in 1922. WOSM has a membership of 155 National Scout Organizations with more than 28 million individuals. Only one Scouting organization per country is recognized by WOSM (BSA is the official Scouting organization in America). In about ten percent of the countries, the National Scout Organization is a federation composed of more than one Scout association; some of the associations in a federation may be for members of a specific religion (e.g., Denmark and France), ethnicity (e.g., Bosnia and Israel), or native language (e.g., Belgium).

On religion, WOSM states the following about its Fundamental Principles:

Under the title "Duty to God", the first of the above-mentioned principles of the Scout Movement is defined as "adherence to spiritual principles, loyalty to the religion that expresses them and acceptance of the duties resulting therefrom". ...the body of the text does not use the word "God", in order to make it clear that the clause also covers religions which are non-monotheistic, such as Hinduism, or those which do not recognize a personal God, such as Buddhism.

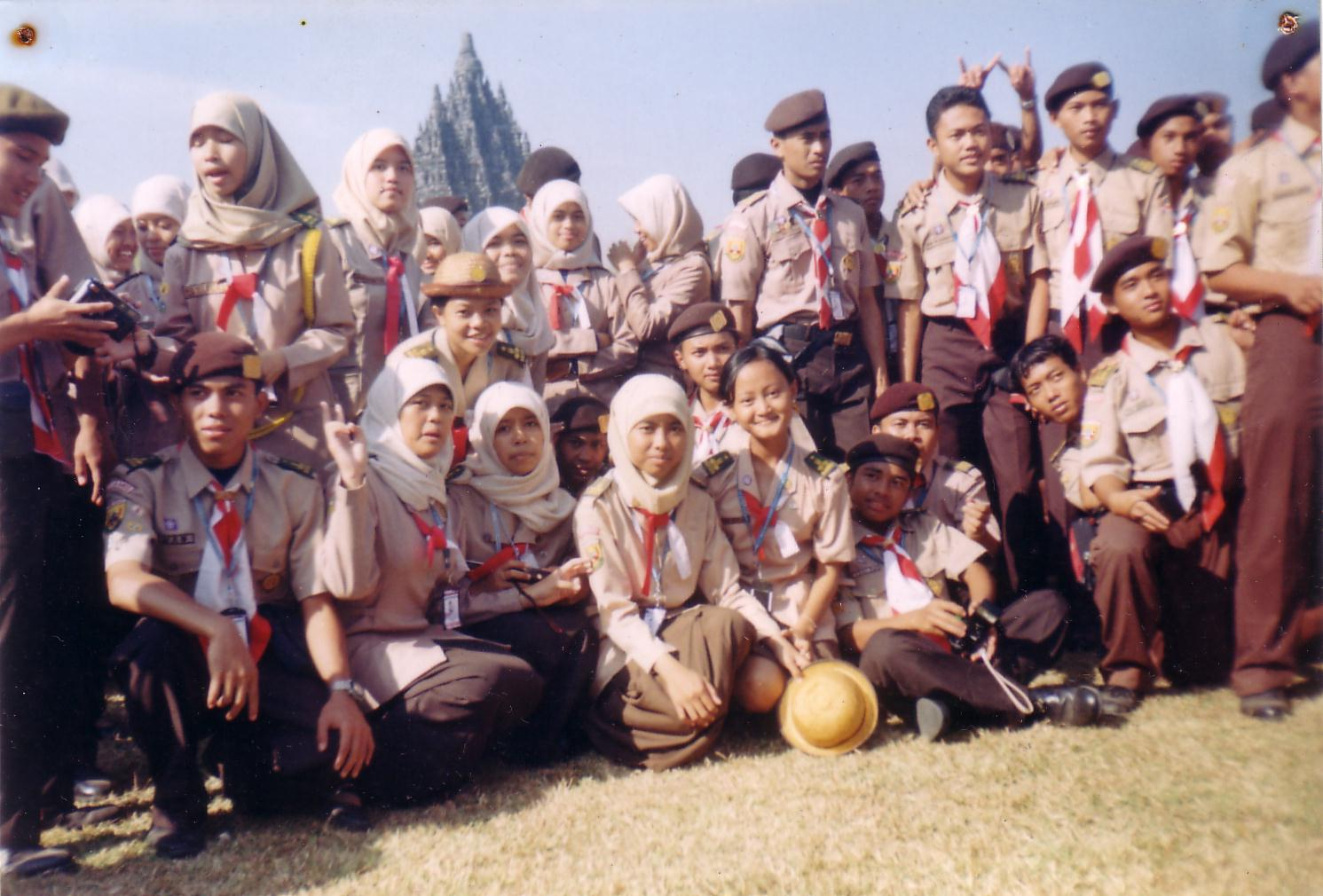
Indonesian Scouts at the 8th Indonesian National Rover Moot July 8–17, 2003, Prambanan Temple-Yogyakarta

The value system of the BSA and other Scouting associations around the world may differ; this is evident in the different Scout promises and laws used by associations. Most other Scouting associations laws do not include the very specific wording to be "reverent" and "morally straight" which BSA added at its founding in 1910. Correspondingly, the membership policies of Scouting associations may differ as well (see Scout Promise and Scout Law).

"Duty to God" is a principle of worldwide Scouting and WOSM requires its member National Scout Organizations to reference "duty to God" in their Scout Promises (see WOSM Scout Promise requirements). Scouting associations apply this principle to their membership policies in different ways. Scouts Canada defines "duty to God" broadly in terms of "adherence to spiritual principles" and does not have any explicit policy excluding non-theists. According to the old Equal Opportunities Policy of The Scout Association in the United Kingdom:

To enable young people to grow into independent adults the Scout method encourages young people to question what they have been taught. Scouts and Venture Scouts who question God's existence, their own spirituality or the structures and beliefs of any or all religions are simply searching for spiritual understanding. This notion of a search for enlightenment is compatible with belief in most of the world's faiths. It is unacceptable to refuse Membership, or question a young person's suitability to continue to participate fully in a Section, if they express doubts about the meaning of the Promise.

On January 1, 2014, the Scout Association allowed an additional revised promise "that can be taken by people with no affirmed faith and humanists". and changed its Equal Opportunities Policy to state that neither youth nor adults should be discriminated against for, among other reasons, "religion or belief (including the absence of belief)".

The membership policies of Scouting organizations also vary regarding the inclusion of girls, see Coeducational Scouting.

== Historical membership controversies ==
There have been membership controversies in the past that have been resolved, such as those related to the exclusion of women from some leadership positions, the breakup of Exploring, and racial segregation.

=== Racial segregation ===
Segregated public schools were declared unconstitutional in 1954 by a unanimous Supreme Court ruling in Brown v. Board of Education, but the Boy Scouts of America included racially segregated units as late as 1974.

In 1974, the National Association for the Advancement of Colored People sued in response to such racial discrimination in Latter-day Saints-affiliated troops. Two 12-year-old black Scouts sought to fill the role of Senior Patrol Leader. Mormon boys enter the lowest level of the priesthood at 12, and the church's rules required that the Senior Patrol Leader be a deacon with the church. Until 1978, Mormon doctrine prohibited people of African descent from being members of the priesthood, and thus black Scouts were prohibited from holding the office of Senior Patrol Leader in Mormon-affiliated troops. The parties ultimately reached settlement.

== BSA membership size ==
Annual Youth Membership
Year	Tiger Cubs, Cubs, Webelos	Boy Scouts, Varsity Scouts	Venturers (post-1997), Explorers (pre-1998), not incl. LFL (post-1989)	Total Traditional Scouting
1999	2,181,013	1,028,353	202,486	3,411,852
2000	2,114,405	1,003,681	233,828	3,351,914
2001	2,043,478	1,005,592	276,434	3,325,504
2002	2,000,478	1,010,791	293,323	3,304,592
2003	1,914,425	997,398	288,395	3,200,218
2004	1,875,752	988,995	280,584	3,145,331
2005	1,745,324	943,426	249,948	2,938,698
2006	1,701,861	922,836	244,256	2,868,963
2007	1,687,986	913,588	254,259	2,855,833
2008	1,665,635	905,879	261,122	2,832,636
2009	1,634,951	898,320	257,361	2,790,632
2010	1,601,994	898,852	238,846	2,739,692
2011	1,583,166	909,576	231,127	2,723,869
2012	1,528,421	910,163	219,453	2,658,794
2013	1,417,034	888,947	192,080	2,498,061
2014	1,295,527	854,692	157,655	2,307,874
2015	1,261,340	840,654	142,892	2,244,886
2016	1,262,311	822,999	136,629	2,221,939
2017	1,245,882	834,124	87,827	2,167,833
2018	1,231,831	789,784	55,101	2,076,716
2019	1,176,119	798,516	42,571	2,017,206
2020	649,248	474,403	23,731	1,147,382
2021	526,310	439,603	17,280	983,193
2022	580,194	414,564	15,400	1,010,158
2023	574,365	392,275	14,961	981,601
2024	589,253	388,941	14,986	993,180
Most Recent Peak	1999	1999	2008	1997
Change (1999 to 2023)	-73.7%	-61.9%	-92.6%	-71.2%

== In popular culture ==
In 2001, South Park satirized the controversy over inclusion of gay men as scoutmasters. In that episode, "Cripple Fight", Big Gay Al, the local scoutmaster, is beloved by the boys. Under pressure from parents, BSA leaders kick Big Gay Al out of the group and he is replaced by a very regimenting and masculine man who goes on to commit abuses.

== See also ==
- Len Lanzi
- Religion in Scouting
- Religious emblems programs (Boy Scouts of America)
- Scouting controversy and conflict
- Scouting/USA
