= Cradle of Liberty Council v. City of Philadelphia =

2010 United States District Court case

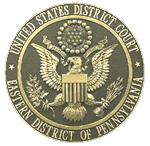
- Court: United States District Court for the Eastern District of Pennsylvania
- Full case name: Cradle of Liberty Council, Inc., Boy Scouts of America, v. City of Philadelphia
- Decided: June 23, 2010

Case history
- Subsequent actions: City filed and withdrew an appeal, agreed to pay the Cradle of Liberty Council for construction improvements in exchange to the Scouts vacating the property

Holding
- Federal Jury sided with the Cradle of Liberty Council and against the city's unlawful selective eviction of the Boy Scouts

Court membership
- Judge sitting: Ronald L. Buckwalter

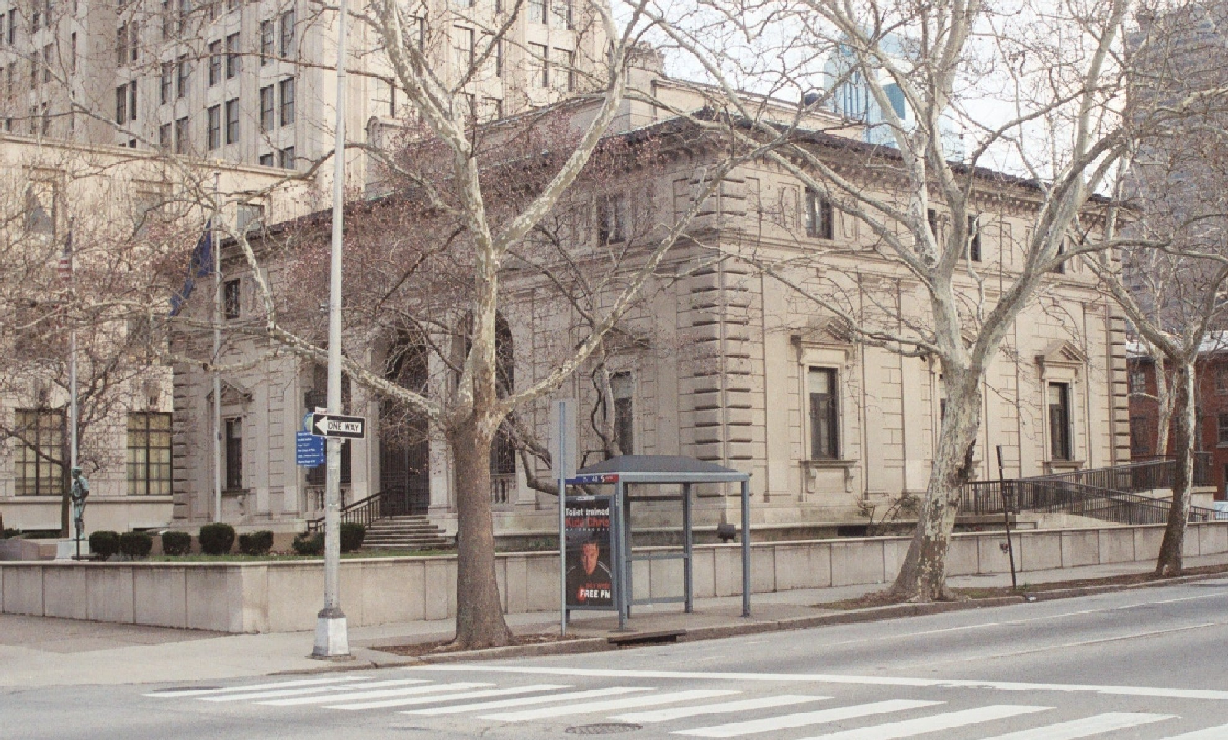
Bruce S. Marks Scout Resource Center

Cradle of Liberty Council, Inc., Boy Scouts of America, v. City of Philadelphia also known as Cradle of Liberty Council v. City of Philadelphia, [2:08-cv-02429RB] is a U.S. Court case involving the Cradle of Liberty Council versus the City of Philadelphia. The case was filed on May 23, 2008, in the United States District Court for the Eastern District of Pennsylvania. Judge Ronald L. Buckwalter presided over the case. The Boy Scouts were represented by Drinker Biddle & Reath. The case ended with the court ruling in favor of the Boy Scouts of America. The Cradle of Liberty Council Council is also entitled to collect $877,000 of legal costs from the city's unlawful action.

== Background ==
The City of Philadelphia said that it cannot allow organizations that receive city benefits to discriminate and planned to evict the local Scout council from their city-owned service center building on the Benjamin Franklin Parkway. Similar city owned land was used by other organizations such as churches which have a religious test for the participants. The Historic Landmark building laden with Scouting symbols was built and paid for by the Scouts on city land at the city's request in 1929 and the cost of maintenance and renovation has been borne by the Boy Scout council ever since.

The Council claimed:

The City has imposed an unconstitutional condition upon Cradle of Liberty's receipt of a benefit that Cradle of Liberty has enjoyed for nearly eight decades, and that many other organizations that limit members or services to members of a particular group continue to enjoy without punishment or the threat of punishment

— COLBSA Court Filing

The Boy Scouts of America is a private, non-profit organization engaged in instilling its system of values in young people. It formerly asserted that open homosexuality by leaders is inconsistent with those values. The Scouts contend that the city's ultimatum violates their rights under the U.S. and Pennsylvania Constitutions, namely, the right to Freedom of Assembly guaranteed under the First Amendment to the United States Constitution.

In 2003, the City of Philadelphia, under the leadership of Mayor John F. Street, indicated that council's policies violated the city's 1982 Fair Practices law. This effort to have the Scouts change their policy or be evicted was led by R. Duane Perry, an Eagle Scout and gay rights activist.

The Boy Scouts of America formerly maintained an official policy of barring "avowed homosexuals" from leadership; Cradle of Liberty, however, had adopted a non-discrimination policy. The BSA National Office sent Cradle of Liberty a cease-and-desist letter which threatened dissolution of the council if it failed to adopt the policies set forth by the National office, and the council rescinded its non-discrimination policy at the annual BSA meeting. Philadelphia, whose city charter bylaws prohibit discrimination against all individuals, including anti-gay discrimination, owns the land on which the council headquarters building stands and rents it to the council for $1 annually. Similar deals are given to other non-profits, including churches that have religious tests for their leadership.

Because of the council's decision to follow national policy, the city wanted the council to vacate the office at 23rd and Winter Streets (near the Franklin Institute); this decision drew fire from Scouting officials and city residents who saw Scouting as an alternative to the "mean streets" of the depressed areas of the city. In 2004, negotiations with the city resulted with the Scouts promising not to "unlawfully discriminate." This agreement held until the city realized that under the Supreme Court decision (Boy Scouts of America v. Dale) the Scouts could lawfully exclude people from membership. Afterward, the city reversed its decision.

In July 2006, Mayor Street again told the council to either change its policy, pay fair market rent or leave the city-owned Marks Scout Resource Center. The city said that providing the city-owned property rent-free to the council violates Philadelphia's anti-discrimination laws. The BSA fought the city's decision.

Local Boy Scouts officials must vacate their Center City headquarters by July 24, 2007, if they don’t begin either paying rent or accepting gays, City Solicitor Romulo L. Diaz Jr. said this week. The commission issued its notice to the Scouts on July 24, 2006, stating they could avoid eviction if they began paying fair-market rent or accepting gays, Diaz said. "Our position is that [the Scouts] already have been given notice," Diaz told Philadelphia Gay News. "The clock began ticking on July 24, 2006, at the latest." The mayor and City Council also must approve the eviction, but the 1928 ordinance doesn’t specify a time frame for those approvals, Diaz added.

However, citing "rising violence and other urban ills daily threatening Philadelphia's teens," some community leaders said it made no sense to evict the Boy Scouts. Also, some questioned the objectivity of city solicitor Romulo L. Diaz, Jr., himself openly gay, in moving to evict the Scouts but not worrying about similar deals with churches who restrict attendance to members. - arguing that the city could lose $62 million in federal funds with the eviction because of the Support Our Scouts Act of 2005 and the Boy Scouts of America Equal Access Act.

Around May 31, 2007, the Philadelphia City Council voted 16-1 on a bill introduced by Darrell L. Clarke to permit the eviction and terminate the 1928 lease by which the council was allowed the use of the building "in perpetuity." This came despite the fact that the building itself was built and paid for by the Scouts, and given to the city with the understanding that the Scouts would be allowed to remain in it "in perpetuity." Because of this decision, the council would have had to pay $200,000 rent or leave the building.

This would have left Philadelphia to become the largest city in the nation without its own council office. Street's successor, Mayor Michael Nutter said in a televised debate on NBC 10 Live @ Issue, "In my administration, we will not subsidize discrimination." Solicitor Diaz gave the Council until December 3, 2007 to comply with the city's demand.

The Scouts indicated they would file suit, and did so in May 2008. The scouts claimed their civil rights were being violated, and the firm Drinker Biddle took the case pro bono. On September 26, 2008, the US District Court said that the Council's claim that the city's actions were designed to impinge BSA's First Amendment rights had merit and that BSA's suit could proceed.

On November 20, 2009, the US District Court ordered the city to "immediately cease and desist" efforts in Common Pleas Court to evict the council from its headquarters while a federal lawsuit was pending. The ruling by Judge Buckwalter did not prevent the city from pursuing similar claims in the federal suit.

== Outcome ==
On June 15, 2010, the case went to trial in Federal Court and 8 days later, on June 23, 2010, a Federal Jury of eight unanimously sided with the Cradle of Liberty Council and against the city's unlawful selective eviction of the Boy Scouts.

Under federal Civil Rights Law, the Cradle of Liberty Council Council is also entitled to collect its $877,000 of legal costs from the city's unlawful action to abridge the Boy Scouts' Constitutionally protected civil right of Freedom of Association. As a result, the city and the Cradle of Liberty Council engaged in negotiations to transfer the building from the city to the council in exchange for the council not collecting those legal costs from the city. Transfer of the land and building from city to the council would have effectively ended the controversy.

While the Boy Scouts offered to then settle the dispute by having the City pay half of the legal fees in return for title to the building and the city accepted, the city council later reneged. On March 2, 2012, the Federal judge then formally ordered the city pay all of the Boy Scouts legal fees and denied the motion for an appeal to settle the matter. The Boy Scouts may also continue reside in the building rent free as they have done since they had paid for construction of the building in 1929.

On May 3, 2013, the City withdrew its appeal and agreed to pay the Cradle of Liberty Council $825,000 for improvements made to its building over the past 85 years. In exchange, the Scouts agreed to vacate the property, with the administrative offices leaving by June 30 and the scouting retail store by Oct. 31.

== See also ==
- Scouting in Pennsylvania
