= Scouting/USA =

1970s-era Scouting/USA branding

Scouting/USA was a "communicative name" chosen by the Boy Scouts of America in 1976 in an effort to rebrand itself. The Scouting/USA logo was unveiled at its biennial National Council meeting. The organization retained the name Boy Scouts of America as its legal name, but planned to use the new name on literature, billboards, insignia, business cards and stationery and for most other promotional material. They quietly abandoned this effort by 1980 and the printing of the ninth edition of the Boy Scout Handbook.

== Background ==
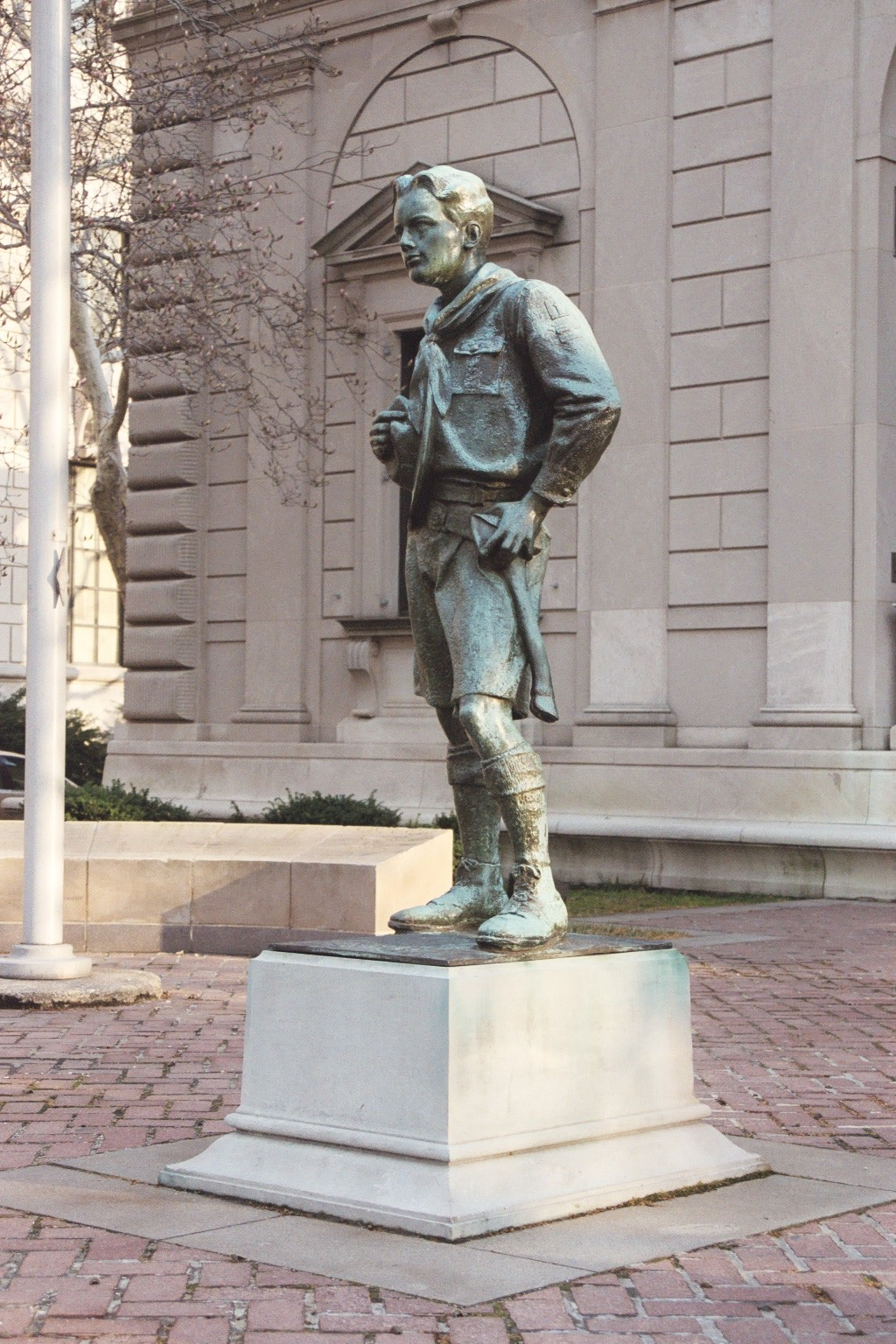
The Ideal Scout

You can see that it would be tough to use the word "boy" when your troop is 80 per cent black. But I also thought that "boy" ignored girls' involvement in scouting. The new name takes it all in.

With the inclusion of girls in the Exploring program, and in an effort to appeal to underserved communities (i.e. Latino, African Americans, Asian Americans, Native Americans, and Native Hawaiians) the national headquarters said, "The word 'boy' is objectionable to minorities, our young adult (male and female) leaders and naturally to the young women enrolled in our coed Exploring program."

Additionally, the rebranding was meant to identify the organization with the country it worked in, the United States, rather than a continent, America; and be inclusive of all of its programs: Cub Scouts, Boy Scouts, and Exploring.

Despite some reservations among its members and the community, the BSA went ahead with the rebranding. "Forward Together/Scouting USA" became the theme of the 1977 National Scout Jamboree. The BSA also tried to reinforce this by emphasizing that everyone in Scouting should be moving forward together.

A new, bright red and white symbol, included a modernized version of the traditional fleur-de-lis of Scouting was introduced. The symbol, along with the new name was meant to the broadened scope of the organization.

The Girl Scouts were not happy. Leaders with the GSUSA accused the BSA of chauvinism, moving forward with the name change without consideration to how it would affect the girls. The GSUSA also claimed that the public would assume that GSUSA was a part of Scouting/USA, which it was not. Many of these same charges arose in 2018 and 2019 with the renaming of BSA's flagship Scouting program, Boy Scouts, to Scouts BSA. Longtime observers of Scouting will note that this is not the first time the two Scout organizations have fought over the use of the term, "Scout".

== See also ==
- Boy Scouts of America membership controversies
- Yeaw v. Boy Scouts of America
- Scouts BSA
