= Golden Empire Council =

Nonprofit organization

Golden Empire Council (#047)
- Owner: Boy Scouts of America
- Headquarters: Sacramento, California
- Country: United States
- Founded: 1920
- Website gec-bsa.org

The Golden Empire Council (GEC-BSA) is a California-based 501(c)(3) nonprofit affiliated with the Boy Scouts of America and its Western Region, Area 4. The council serves a large section of Northern California, primarily the Sacramento Valley and the northern Sierra Nevada. Its boundaries range north to south from Redding to Elk Grove and west to east from Vacaville to Pollock Pines and include 16 Northern California Counties (listed below) . Its council headquarters and service center is located in Sacramento. The council also operates two Scout Shops selling BSA merchandise; located in Sacramento and Chico.

The Golden Empire Council serves over 6,000 youth members as of 2021.

== History ==
The Golden Empire Council was founded in 1920 as the Sacramento Council. The council changed its name to the Sacramento Area Council in 1933, and to Golden Empire in 1937. In 1927, the Kit Carson Council (#46), founded in 1924, merged into the council. In 1971, the Tahoe Area Council (#648), founded in 1924, merged into the council. In 1992, the Mount Lassen Area Council (#036) and Buttes Area Council, both founded in 1924, merged into the council. The Mount Lassen Area Council had absorbed the Mount Shasta Area Council (#037), founded in 1923, in 1926.

== Organization ==
GEC is organized into 7 separate districts that cover its 16 different counties, supported by a professional District Executive and volunteer leadership.

- American River: El Dorado County. Western Slope’ including Placerville (but not South Lake Tahoe served by Nevada Area Council), and Sacramento County (West) cities Folsom, California, Rancho Cordova, California, and other Sacramento County (East) communities including Gold River, California and Mather, California among others.
- Buttes: Buttes, Colusa, Glen, Nevada, Sierra, Sutter, and Yuba counties. Includes the communities of Yuba City and Marysville among others.
- Northern Rivers: Shasta, Tehama, Trinity, Siskiyou, Modoc, and Glenn Counties. Includes Redding and Red Bluff among others.
- Pioneer Express: Covers communities in Sacramento County (North). Includes the communities of Natomas, North Highlands, Carmichael, and Fair Oaks among others.
- Placer: Placer County communities including Auburn, California, Granite Bay, California, Lincoln, California, and Roseville, California among others.
- Three Rivers: Amador and Sacramento County (South). Includes the communities of Jackson, California and Elk Grove, among others.
- Yolo: Covers Yolo County, a small part of Solano County and a portion of Sacramento County (East). Includes Davis, California and Woodland, California among others.

== Camps ==
GEC owns and operates four camp properties: Camp Winton, Camp Lassen, Camp Robert L. Cole, and the NorCal Adventure Area.

== See also ==
- Scouting in California
- Yeaw v. Boy Scouts of America
