= 2006 United States federal budget =

2006 Budget of the United States federal government
- Submitted: February 7, 2005
- Submitted by: George W. Bush
- Submitted to: 109th Congress
- Country: United States
- Total revenue: $2.178 trillion (requested) $2.407 trillion (actual); 17.6% of GDP (actual)
- Total expenditures: $2.568 trillion (requested) $2.655 trillion (actual); 19.4% of GDP (actual)
- Deficit: $390 billion (requested) $248.2 billion (actual); 1.8% of GDP (actual)
- Debt: $8.45 trillion (at fiscal end); 61.8% of GDP (actual)
- GDP: $13.685 trillion
- Website: Office of Management and Budget

The 2006 United States Federal Budget began as a proposal by President George W. Bush to fund government operations for October 1, 2005 – September 30, 2006. The requested budget was submitted to the 109th Congress on February 7, 2005.

The government was initially funded through a series of three temporary continuing resolutions. Final funding for the government was enacted as several appropriations bills enacted between August 2 and December 30, 2005. As of 2018, this is the last fiscal year to be funded without the use of an omnibus spending bill or full-year continuing resolution.

== Congressional action ==
=== Enacted Appropriations ===
Public Law #	Description	Passed House	Passed Senate	Signed by President
109‑54	Department of the Interior, Environment, and Related Agencies Appropriations Act, 2006	07/28/2005 roll call vote (original bill passed in the House on 05/19/2005)	07/29/2005 voice vote (House bill with amendment(s) passed in the Senate on 06/29/2005)	08/02/2005
109‑55	Legislative Branch Appropriations Act, 2006	07/28/2005 roll call vote (original bill passed in the House on 06/22/2005)	07/29/2005 roll call vote (bill with amendment(s) passed in the Senate on 06/30/2005)	08/02/2005
109‑77	Continuing appropriations through Nov 18, 2005	09/29/2005 roll call vote	09/30/2005 voice vote	09/30/2005
109‑90	Department of Homeland Security Appropriations Act, 2006	10/06/2005 roll call vote (original bill passed in the House on 05/17/2005)	10/07/2005 roll call vote (bill with amendment(s) passed in the Senate on 07/14/2005)	10/18/2005
109‑97	Agriculture, Rural Development, Food and Drug Administration, and Related Agencies Appropriations Act, 2006	10/28/2005 roll call vote (original bill passed in the House on 06/08/2005)	11/03/2005 roll call vote (bill with amendment(s) passed in the Senate on 09/22/2005)	11/10/2005
109‑102	Foreign Operations, Export Financing, and Related Programs Appropriations Act, 2006	11/04/2005 roll call vote (original bill passed in the House on 06/28/2005)	11/10/2005 unanimous consent (bill with amendment(s) passed in the Senate on 07/20/2005)	11/14/2005
109‑103	Energy and Water Development Appropriations Act, 2006	11/09/2005 roll call vote (original bill passed in the House on 05/24/2005)	11/14/2005 roll call vote (bill with amendment(s) passed in the Senate on 07/01/2005)	11/18/2005
109‑105	Continuing appropriations through Dec 17, 2005	11/17/2005 roll call vote	11/18/2005 voice vote	11/19/2005
109‑108	Science, State, Justice, Commerce, and Related Agencies Appropriations Act, 2006	09/15/2005 roll call vote (original bill passed in the House on 06/16/2005)	11/16/2005 roll call vote (bill with amendment(s) passed in the Senate on 09/15/2005)	11/22/2005
109‑114	Military Quality of Life and Veterans Affairs Appropriations Act, 2006	11/18/2005 roll call vote (original bill passed in the House on 05/26/2005)	11/18/2005 roll call vote (bill with amendment(s) passed in the Senate on 09/22/2005)	11/30/2005
109‑115	Transportation, Treasury, Housing and Urban Development, the Judiciary, the District of Columbia, and Independent Agencies Appropriations Act, 2006	11/18/2005 roll call vote (original bill passed in the House on 06/30/2005)	11/21/2005 roll call vote (bill with amendment(s) passed in the Senate on 10/20/2005)	11/30/2005
109‑128	Continuing appropriations through Dec 31, 2005	12/17/2005 voice vote	12/17/2005 unanimous consent	12/18/2005
109‑149	Departments of Labor, Health and Human Services, and Education, and Related Agencies Appropriations Act, 2006	12/14/2005 roll call vote (original bill passed in the House on 06/24/2005)	12/21/2005 roll call vote (bill with amendment(s) passed in the Senate on 10/27/2005)	12/30/2005
109‑148	See also: Public Law 109-148 Department of Defense, Emergency Supplemental Appropriations to Address Hurricanes in the Gulf of Mexico, and Pandemic Influenza Act, 2006	12/19/2005 roll call vote (original bill passed in the House on 06/20/2005)	12/21/2005 roll call vote (bill with amendment(s) passed in the Senate on 10/07/2005)	12/30/2005
109‑234	Emergency Supplemental Appropriations Act for Defense, the Global War on Terror, and Hurricane Recovery, 2006	06/13/2006 roll call vote (original bill passed in the House on 03/16/2006)	06/15/2006 roll call vote (bill with amendment(s) passed in the Senate on 05/04/2006)	06/15/2006

== Total Receipts ==
2006 Actual Receipts by Source
1. Individual income tax (43.4%)
2. Social Security/other payroll tax (34.8%)
3. Corporate income tax (14.7%)
4. Excise tax (3.10%)
5. Estate and gift taxes (1.20%)
6. Customs duties (1.00%)
7. Other miscellaneous receipts (1.90%)

Receipts by source: (in billions of dollars)

Source	Requested	Actual
Individual income tax	967	1,044
Corporate income tax	220	354
Social Security and other payroll tax	819	838
Excise tax	76	74
Estate and gift taxes	26	28
Customs duties	28	25
Other miscellaneous receipts (Including, Capital gains tax and Generation-skipping transfer tax)	42	45
Total	2,178	2,407

== Total Spending ==
The President's budget for 2006 totals $2.7 trillion. This budget request is broken down by the following expenditures:

- $544.8 billion (20.90%) - Social Security
- $512.1 billion (18.00%) - Defense
- $359.5 billion (13.79%) - Unemployment and welfare
- $345.7 billion (13.26%) - Medicare
- $268.4 billion (10.30%) - Medicaid and other health related
- $211.1 billion (8.10%) - Interest on debt
- $88.7 billion (3.40%) - Education and training
- $70.7 billion (2.71%) - Transportation
- $68.4 billion (2.62%) - Veterans' benefits
- $43.1 billion (1.65%) - Administration of justice
- $38.4 billion (1.47%) - Foreign affairs
- $31.2 billion (1.20%) - Natural resources and environment
- $26.0 billion (1.00%) - Agriculture
- $24.0 billion (0.92%) - Science and technology
- $19.1 billion (0.73%) - Community and regional development
- $17.8 billion (0.68%) - General government
- $23.4 billion - Energy

=== Adjustments ===
- -$698 billion (2.68%) - Undistributed offsetting receipts

== 2006 Deficit Estimate ==
(The amount that government spending exceeds total receipts)

- $500 billion

== See also ==
- United States budget process
