= Support Our Scouts Act =

2005 act of United States Congress

Support Our Scouts Act of 2005
- Enacted by: the 109th United States Congress

The Support Our Scouts Act of 2005 was passed as part of the Department of Defense Appropriations Act, 2006 (Public Law 109-148, Division A, Title VIII, Sec. 8126) to prevent Local, State and Federal agencies from reducing their support for the Boy Scouts of America (and other youth organization). The bill was passed in the wake of a number of controversies involving the Boy Scouts of America, such as their exclusion of gays and atheists, and subsequent attempts to limit government support of the organization.

== Legislative language ==
In particular, the bill states:

- No Federal law... shall be construed to limit any Federal agency from providing any form of support for a youth organization (including the Boy Scouts of America or any group officially affiliated with the Boy Scouts of America) that would result in that Federal agency providing less support to that youth organization... than was provided during the preceding fiscal year.
- The Secretary of Defense shall provide at least the same level of support under this section for a national or world Boy Scout Jamboree as was provided under this section for the preceding national or world Boy Scout Jamboree.
- No State or unit of general local government that has a designated open forum, limited public forum, or nonpublic forum and that is a recipient of assistance under this title shall deny equal access or a fair opportunity to meet to, or discriminate against, any youth organization, including the Boy Scouts of America or any group officially affiliated with the Boy Scouts of America, that wishes to conduct a meeting or otherwise participate in that designated open forum, limited public forum, or nonpublic forum.

In October 2005, the Senate agreed to include the proposed legislation as an amendment (S.Amdt.2054) to the Department of Defense Appropriations Act, 2006 by unanimous consent and, after holding a joint conference with the House to reconcile differences with each of their own versions of the appropriations bill, passed the Senate 93–0 in December 2005 (H.R.2863, Sec. 8126.)

== Impact ==
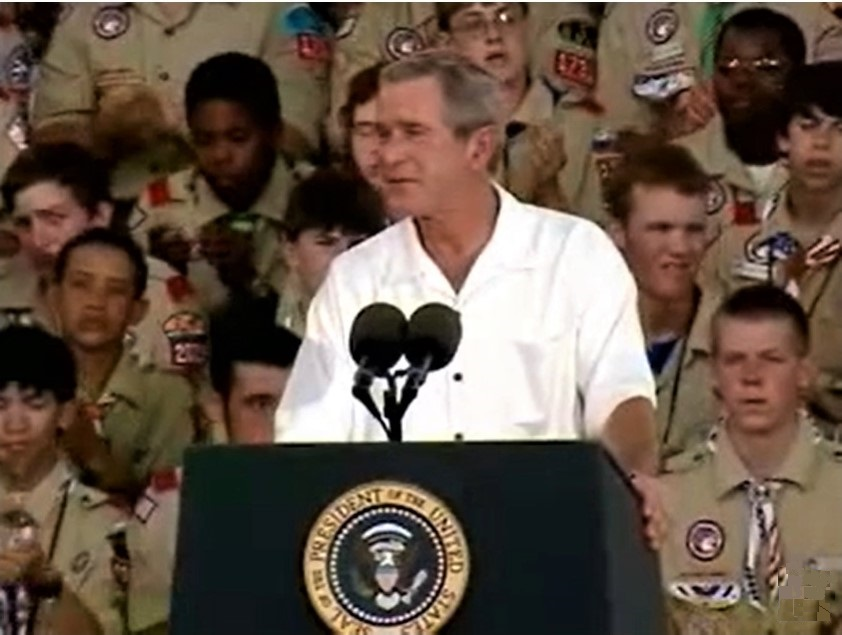
President Bush at the Jamboree

SOSA was signed into law along with the entire Appropriations bill by President George W. Bush on December 30, 2005. Earlier in the year, Bush had indicated his support for the act.

Scout leaders welcomed the legislation because it protected them "against constant attempts to exclude the organization from the public realm." Since the enactment of the act, no new restrictions on Boy Scout access to public facilities have been reported to have been initiated. In the Appellate Decision regarding Winkler v. Rumsfeld, the Appellate Court cited the act as showing the will of Congress to allow Boy Scouts continued access.

== See also ==
- Good News Club v. Milford Central School (2001); Supreme Court case that established the precedent legislated by the Support Our Scouts Act
