= Evans v. Berkeley =

2006 US court case regarding sexual discrimination

- Supreme Court of California

Argued January 10, 2006 Decided March 9, 2006
- Full case name: Eugene Evans et al., Plaintiffs and Appellants, v. City of Berkeley, et al., Defendants and Respondents.
- Citation(s): 38 Cal. 4th 1; 129 P.3d 394; 40 Cal. Rptr. 3d 205

Case history
- Prior history: Judgment for defendants affirmed, 104 Cal. App. 4th 1

Holding
- A government entity may withhold financial support from a nonprofit organization that discriminates on the basis of sexual orientation.

Court membership
- Chief Justice: Ronald M. George
- Associate Justices: Joyce L. Kennard, Marvin R. Baxter, Kathryn Werdegar, Ming Chin, Carlos R. Moreno, Carol Corrigan

Case opinions
- Majority: Werdegar, joined by George, Kennard, Baxter, Chin, Moreno, Corrigan

Evans v. Berkeley was a court case which upheld the right of governmental entities in California to withhold support from non-profit organizations that practice discrimination on the basis of sexual orientation.

== Background ==
Sea Scouts is a nautical-themed youth program of the Boy Scouts of America. At the time of this lawsuit, the BSA had policies forbidding avowed homosexuals from membership in BSA, and these policies also applied to Sea Scouting units.

For over 50 years, the city of Berkeley, California had provided various Sea Scout units with free berths in the city's Berkeley Marina, including the ship Farallon, chartered by S.E.S. Farallon Inc., the ship Northland, and the ship St. Ambrose.

== Dispute ==
In 1997, the city passed a resolution requiring that in order to receive free use of the marina, non-profit organizations must "demonstrate" through "membership policies and practices" that it “promote[s] cultural and ethnic diversity.” The resolution also required that access to the marina "not be predicated on a person’s race, color, religion... age, sex, [or] sexual orientation".

Based on the Boy Scouts of America's policy of excluding gays from membership within its organization, the City of Berkeley decided that continued free berthing for Sea Scouts would violate the resolution. As a result, the City terminated the free usage arrangement, and began billing the Sea Scouts the standard rent of $500 per month for the amount of berth space it uses. Two of the three ships, ships Northland and St. Ambrose, moved to marinas in other cities. However, adult leader ("Skipper") of the ship Farallon, Eugene Evans, and thirteen other adult members of the Sea Scouts sued the City of Berkeley. They alleged that the city's actions violated their Freedom of Speech and Freedom of Association. This suit was by individuals and did not include the BSA as plaintiffs.

A trial court ruled against the plaintiffs, holding that "Berkeley had not 'attempted to muzzle anyone’s speech' or force the Sea Scouts to sever their association with BSA, but had only 'conditioned a city subsidy on compliance with nondiscrimination principles'."

In March 2006, the California Supreme Court unanimously upheld the lower courts rulings and found against the plaintiffs: "We agree with Berkeley and the Court of Appeal that a government entity may constitutionally require a recipient of funding or subsidy to provide written, unambiguous assurances of compliance with a generally applicable nondiscrimination policy. We further agree Berkeley reasonably concluded the Sea Scouts did not and could not provide satisfactory assurances because of their required adherence to BSA’s discriminatory policies."

In July 2006 Evans et al. appealed to the United States Supreme Court. On October 16, 2006, the Supreme Court rejected the appeal from Evans without comment, thus allowing the California decision to stand.

== Aftermath ==
In 2007, plaintiff Eugene Evans was removed from BSA membership following reports of sex abuse with Sea Scouts ages 13–17. In 2008, he pleaded no contest to two counts of child molestation with minors after facing 18 charges related to accusations from four current and former Sea Scouts. Evans was sentenced to six years imprisonment, payment of $10,000 in restitution for victims, and registration for life as a sex offender.

The ship Farallon remained at the Berkeley Marina and paid commercial rates until the vessel was sold in 2009 and moved to another location.

== See also ==
- Boy Scouts of America v. Dale
- Boy Scouts of America membership controversies
