= Camp Winton =

Summer camp in California, United States

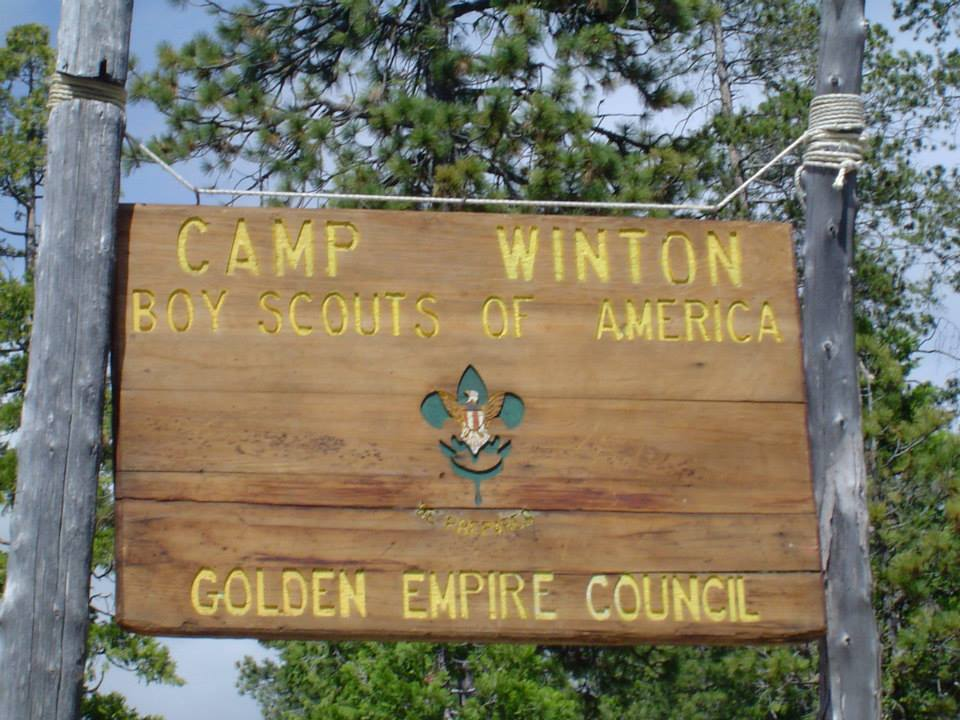
- Sign hung at the entrance to the camp
- Location: Pioneer, California
- Coordinates: 38.6374°N 120.142042°W
- Website http://www.gec-bsa.org/camping-/camp-winton

Camp Winton is a summer camp of the Boy Scouts of America, belonging to the Golden Empire Council. It is located in the Sierra Nevada mountain range at an altitude of 5,800 feet, approximately 20 miles south of Lake Tahoe, close to the town of Pioneer, California, in Amador County. It was founded in 1958, built in the El Dorado National Forest, which land was formerly managed by the Winton Lumber Company, from whence it obtained its name. It is built on the south bank of Lower Bear River Reservoir, and takes pride in its staff and adherence to traditions passed through the years.

Camp Winton is usually closed to the general public, but opens during the summer months to Boy Scout troops.

== Founding ==
The camp was formally dedicated as a summer camp on August 3, 1958, by the Winton Lumber Company. The text of the dedication is cast on a bronze plaque embedded in the rock on "Dedication Point," where the original flag ceremonies took place. The main lodge was built shortly before the camp's founding. At the time, the camp was only accessible by foot or boat, so local materials were used when possible. For example, a large group of Boy Scout volunteers worked collecting rocks to construct the granite chimney. The rocks acted as their "meal ticket." He who brought the biggest rock from the furthest distance got to eat first. Before the renovation of 2008 hid the outside of the chimney from view, it was apparent that many of the rocks weighed in excess of several hundred pounds. The rocks were then mortared in place around a wooden frame for the chimney, which was then burnt out by pouring diesel fuel down the top.

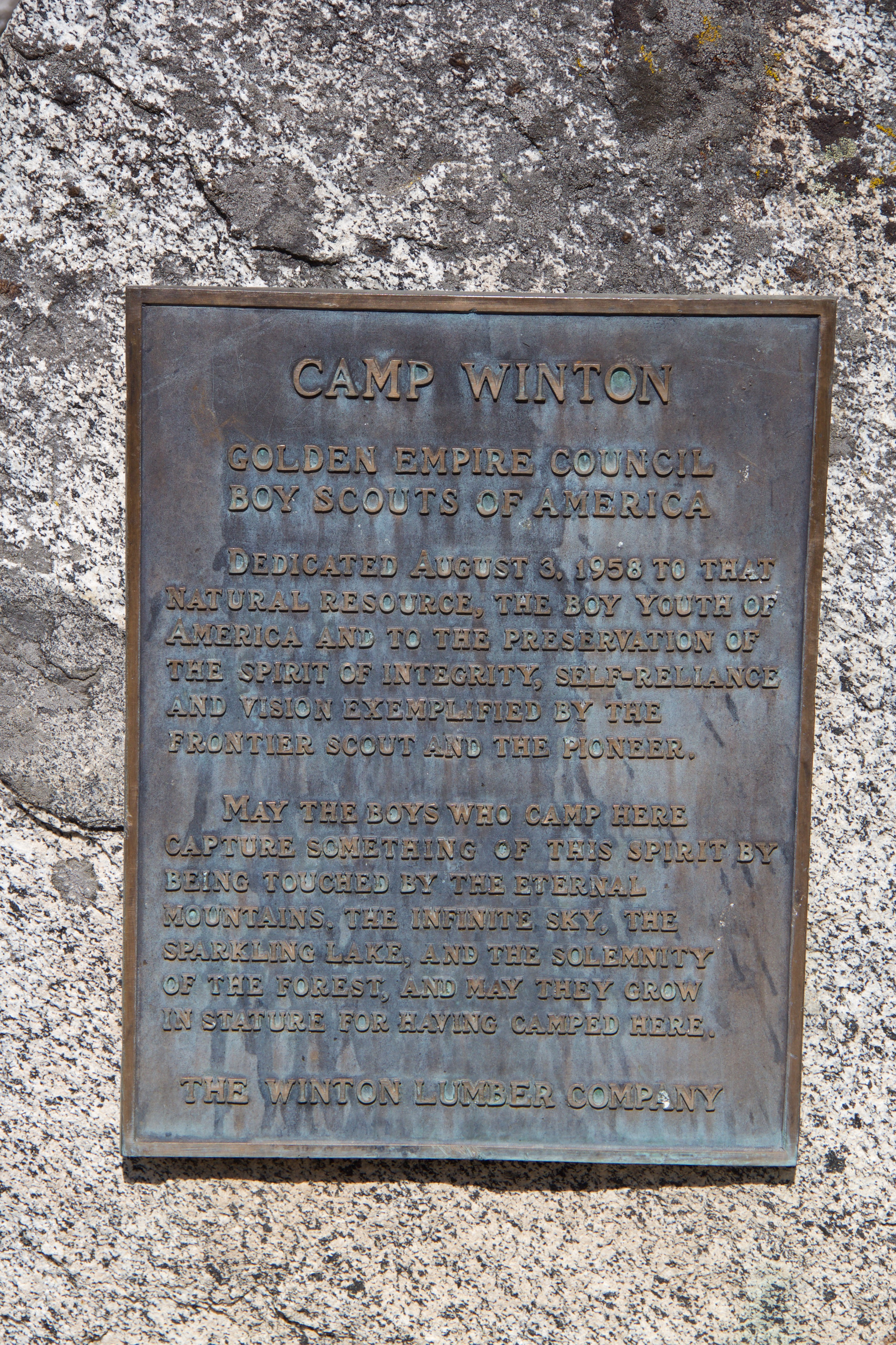
The dedicatory plaque displayed at dedication point

== Development ==
As the camp grew in size, the flag ceremonies were moved from Dedication Point to a large protruding rock on the shore, now named "Flagpole Rock."

The environment also could no longer handle the amount of waste produced by the camp. To solve this problem, a staff member named Karl Heimberg, who was a German WWII tank driver on the eastern front, rented a backhoe which he drove into camp through the forest. With it he excavated several locations throughout camp and built improved vault toilets in the 1980s.

The only medical and emergency response at the camp consisted of a camp medic, who had a tent for the purpose of housing the sick and medical supplies after the original medical lodge degraded and had to be condemned. Karl Heimburg once again drew up plans for a permanent "Medical Lodge" building. Since the camp could only be accessed by boat or by foot, Karl, a mechanic by profession, built a temporary steel barge in 1996 big enough to fit 2 pallets of building materials without sinking. Over the course of a few months all the needed materials were boated into camp. The barge was nicknamed "Das Boat" in honor of Mr. Heimberg, and it has never left the lake since. To this day it is still used to carry troop gear. In the fall of 1997, a dirt fire road was built into camp, making access easier.

Another building was also built, later named the "Duff Holt Trading Post" (for one of the camp directors, who ran the camp from the late 1980s through 1998) which includes a small store, maintenance room, and storage space. Three small cabins were also built in camp for visiting officials or other people of importance, and have since been replaced with three newer buildings for the same purpose. The majority of scouts and staff sleep in tents.

In 2008 the entire lodge and many areas of the camp, such as the septic system and showers, were extensively remodeled thanks to donations. The lodge was renamed "The Wagner Lodge," after the largest donor.

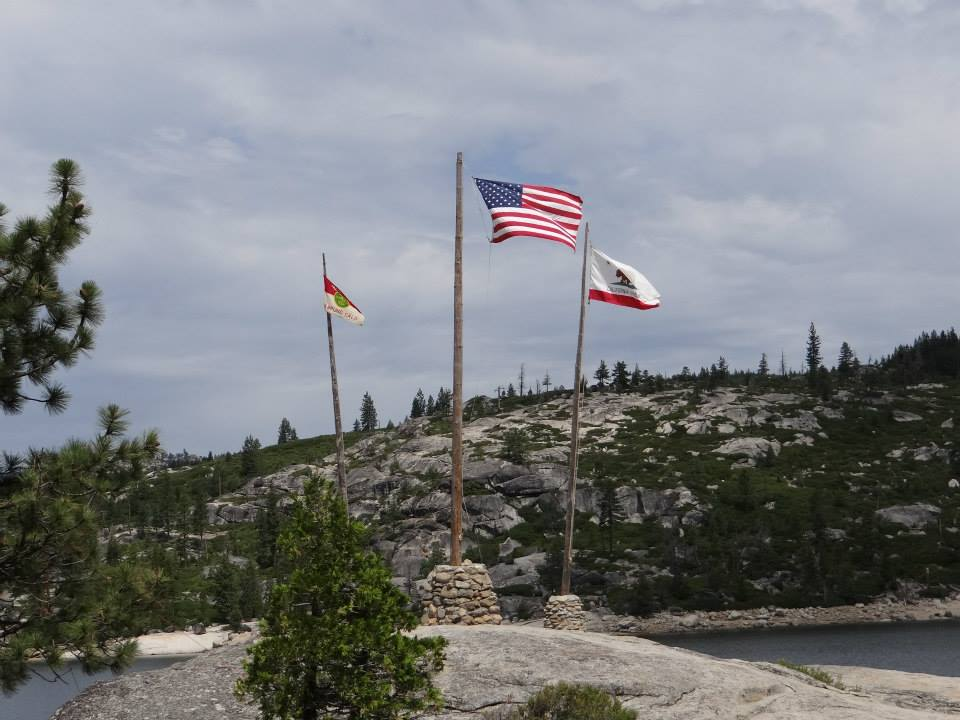
Picture of Flagpole Rock

== Traditions ==
Camp Winton holds true to many traditions. One such tradition is the absence of collars on staff uniforms. According to the legend, the uniforms of the 1950s did not have collars, but some of the uniforms of the 1960s did. This caused some staff to have collars and some to not. So, in order to maintain a uniform look, the staff with collars were instructed to tuck the collar in as to not be noticeable. This tradition passed on until the present day, when all the staff tuck their collars in to honor the decades-old order.

Another tradition is that of loud singing during mealtimes. As the scouts get their food, the staff stand singing as loud as they can until the very last scout gets his food. Also, as per the tradition, the first song always sung is the "Washington Post March", followed by the theme from Gilligan's Island.

The history of Camp Winton can partially be deciphered by the tradition of "totems," which are plaques of artwork created by the staff each year that document important events that occurred. The years of totems are hung inside the lodge. The oldest totem is from 1961, and it is unknown where the totems of 1958–1960 are, if they were ever made.

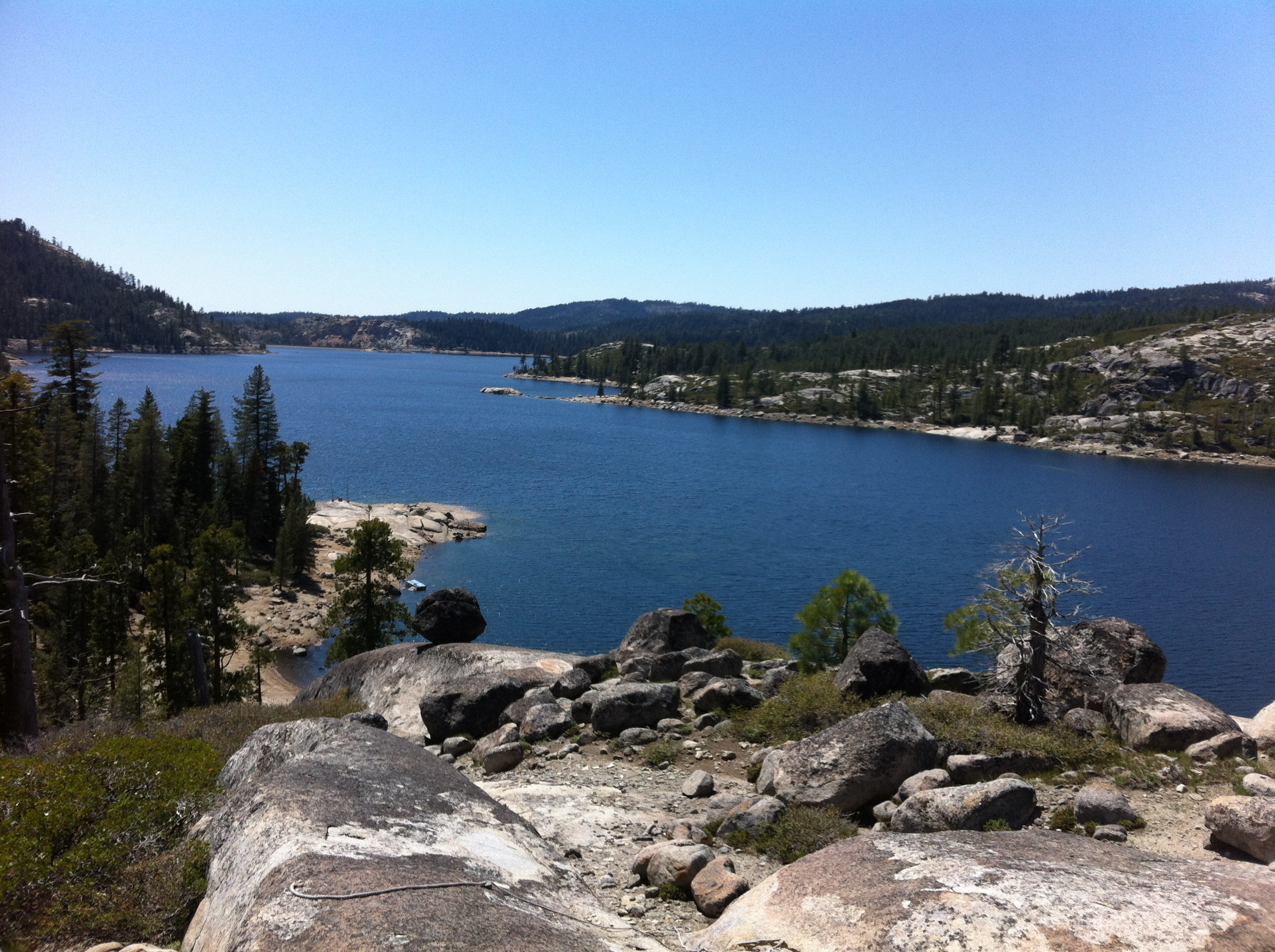
The view of Lower Bear River Reservoir from cliffs near the camp

== Program ==
As with most scout camps, the main attraction at Camp Winton are its merit badge classes. Merit badges and activities include canoeing, motor-boating, pioneering, rifle shooting, leatherworking and other crafts, fishing, and environmental science. The camp also offers campfires through the week with original skits created by past or present staff members. From the 1970s, through 2019, the camp held a "tribe" campfire on Thursday nights, which is partially based on Order of the Arrow ceremonies, with the purpose of building trust and unity among the scouts. This was replaced by a new program known as "Trail" in 2021, which removed all Native American references

== Media coverage and influence ==
- Camp Winton was featured in an episode of Jeopardy! in celebration of the 100th anniversary of Scouting.
- In 2012 the camp received national news coverage for firing an employee after receiving constant complaints about him breaking the dress code. The employee stated that he was fired for being a homosexual. Ten other staff members quit with him in protest. The council leaders that fired him stated that they did not know of his sexual orientation.
