= Public Law 109-148 =

Department of Defense, Emergency Supplemental Appropriations to Address Hurricanes in the Gulf of Mexico, and Pandemic Influenza Act, 2006
- Long title: Making appropriations for the Department of Defense for the fiscal year ending September 30, 2006, and for other purposes.
- Enacted by: the 109th United States Congress

Citations
- Public law: Pub. L. 109–148 (text) (PDF)

Legislative history
- Introduced in the House of Representatives as H.R. 2863 by Bill Young (R‑FL) on June 10, 2005; Passed the House on June 20, 2005 (398 - 19); Passed the Senate on October 7, 2005 (97-0) with amendment; House agreed to Senate amendment on December 19, 2005 (308-106) with further amendment; Senate agreed to House amendment on December 21, 2005 (93-0); Signed into law by President George W. Bush on December 30, 2005

Public Law 109-148 is an appropriations bill enacted by the 109th United States Congress and signed into law by president George W. Bush on December 30, 2005.

It includes:

- The Support Our Scouts Act
- The Detainee Treatment Act
- The Department of Defense Appropriations Act, 2006
- The Higher Education Hurricane Relief Act of 2005
- The Emergency Supplemental Appropriations Act to Address Hurricanes in the Gulf of Mexico and Pandemic Influenza, 2006
- The Public Readiness and Emergency Preparedness Act

== See also ==
- 2005 United States federal budget
