= Winkler v. Rumsfeld =

US legal case

- Court: United States Court of Appeals for the Seventh Circuit
- Full case name: Eugene Winkler, Gary Gerson, Timuel Black, Mary Cay Marubio and C. Douglas Ferguson v. Donald H. Rumsfeld
- Argued: April 6 2006
- Decided: April 4 2007

Holding
- Taxpayers lack standing to sue to address Federal budget issues.

Court membership
- Judges sitting: William J. Bauer; Diane Pamela Wood; Diane S. Sykes

Case opinions
- Majority: Wood, joined by Bauer
- Concurrence: Sykes

Winkler v. Rumsfeld was a case regarding the United States Armed Forces and their support of the Boy Scouts of America's national Scout jamborees.

Every four years, the Boy Scouts of America holds a national Scout jamboree, where for ten days, approximately 30,000-40,000 Scouts camp out and participate in a wide variety of activities. At the time of the case, the US Department of Defense (DOD) was the official host of the jamboree. From 1981 until 2010, the jamboree was held at Fort A.P. Hill, a US Army base in Virginia. The US Government spent an average of $2 million a year towards hosting of the jamboree.

The Boy Scouts of America has always required all Scouts to agree to the Scout Oath which includes the phrase "To do my Duty to God". There have been several high-profile cases in which atheists and agnostics were removed from the organization for failing to agree to the Scout Oath.

The American Civil Liberties Union brought suit on behalf of Chicago-area taxpayers Eugene Winkler, Methodist pastor, Gary Gerson, Reform rabbi, Timuel Black, teacher and civil rights activist, Douglas Ferguson and Mary Cay Marubio arguing that the Department of Defense's use of taxpayer money to fund the jamborees of what they called a private religious organization violates the First Amendment, which prohibits Congress from establishing a religion.

In 2005, a U.S. District Court ruled that the DOD's spending on national Scout jamborees violates the Establishment Clause of the United States Constitution. The decision was subsequently reversed by the US Court of Appeals on April 4, 2007, in Winkler vs Gates (renamed due to a new Secretary of Defense), which ruled that the plaintiffs lacked legal standing as taxpayers to bring the suit in the first place. Therefore, the 2010 Jamboree at Fort A.P. Hill and future support by DOD of Jamborees continued as before.

The case arose out of Winkler v. Chicago School Reform Board of Trustees, in which the plaintiffs sued the U.S. government and the city of Chicago.

== Background information ==
The national Scout jamboree is a large gathering of Scouts held once every four years. Historically, jamborees were held in state and national parks like other groups' gatherings, but mutual concerns by BSA and the government over the environmental impact of 35,000 Scouts camping in heavily used public places led to a 1978 agreement to use infrequently used military facilities instead. The United States military used the jamboree as a large-scale training exercise for engineer, military police, and medical units. In addition, the military supported the jamboree through many different public relations and civilian support functions as well, as well as by teaching merit badges. While only registered Scouts and Scouters are allowed to camp at the jamboree, the exhibits and shows are open for the general public to visit and typically 300,000 persons visit a jamboree.

From 1981 to 2010, the U.S. Army allowed the BSA to use Fort A.P. Hill in Virginia as the home of the national Scout jamboree, as authorized by Congress in 1972 through 10 U.S.C. 2554. As part of the 1978 agreement, BSA paid for capital improvements at Fort A.P. Hill (water lines, road improvements, amphitheater, etc.) that are used by both the jamboree and unrelated military encampments. BSA uses the facility for four weeks once every four years and it is available to the military and other members of the public for the rest of the time. The U.S. military regards the national Scout jamboree as beneficial for public relations and recruitment, and is a unique training opportunity, particularly in testing operations needed to support large-scale military encampments or refugee tent cities.

The U.S. military has supported all of the national Scout jamborees since 1937. Most of the approximately $50 million jamboree expense is paid for by BSA and its participants. About 1,500 troops and DOD contractors are involved during the four weeks of a national jamboree operation. About half of them are involved in military training operations and half are involved in military public relations activities oriented towards the participants and visitors. Total Defense Department funding for these training and public relations activities averaged $8 million per jamboree. According to the government, "these funds were used to pay not only for services provided in support of the event itself, but also for the costs of transporting and billeting the population of soldiers brought to Fort A.P. Hill to perform services during the event."

The BSA requires its members to promise to do their "duty to God", which excludes atheists from participating in jamborees as Scouts, but not as visitors. No Scout is required to participate in any religious ceremony at the Jamboree or elsewhere, but they have to repeat the Scout Oath. This policy has caused controversy and the federal government has been sued by people who claim that direct support of the BSA (such as funding or sponsoring Scouting units) violates the separation of church and state.

A U.S. District Court Judge ruled in June 2005 that federal funding for the national Scout jamboree is unconstitutional because "the Boy Scouts are a religious organization, requiring Scouts to affirm a belief in God." The U.S. Department of Justice appealed the ruling on behalf of the Secretary of Defense, arguing that the military's support for the jamboree does not violate the separation of church and state on the grounds that BSA is not a religious organization, that the plaintiffs had no legal standing to bring the suit in the first place, and that visiting the Jamboree is open to the general public.

After the June 2005 Federal District Court Judge's ruling, Congress enacted and the President signed the Support Our Scouts Act of 2005 on December 30, 2005, to indicate their desire for continued Defense Department support of the jamboree.

The US Court of Appeals determined in April 2007 in Winkler vs Gates that the plaintiffs had no legal standing to bring the suit in the first place, thus ending the suit and affirming that the military may assist future jamborees, including providing campsites at Fort A.P. Hill.

== Reaction ==
Although not an actual litigant in the proceedings, the BSA welcomed the decision, saying:

Boy Scouts of America is pleased that the United States Court of Appeals for the Seventh Circuit dismissed the ACLU’s lawsuit against the Department of Defense for supporting the National Scout Jamboree. Boy Scouts of America is grateful also for the efforts of the Department of Justice in achieving this successful outcome.

For more than 25 years, Boy Scouts have held the national Scout jamboree every four years at Fort A.P. Hill near Fredericksburg, Virginia. Scouts from all over the country camp together for ten days and participate in activities emphasizing physical fitness, appreciation of the outdoors, and patriotism. Seven Presidents have attended the jamboree since President Franklin D. Roosevelt in 1937. The jamboree grounds at Fort A.P. Hill are open to the public, and an estimated 300,000 visitors attended in 2005 along with 43,000 Scouts and their leaders. The 2010 Jamboree will celebrate the 100th Anniversary of Boy Scouts of America.

The United States Congress has found that the military’s logistical support for the national Scout jamboree is an incomparable training opportunity for our armed forces. The jamboree requires the construction, maintenance, and disassembly of a "tent city" capable of supporting tens of thousands of people for a week or longer.

We are pleased that today’s ruling preserves the training opportunity for the military that Congress wanted it to have."

The ACLU considered seeking review by the Supreme Court of the United States. According to the ACLU:

The court did not reach the core constitutional issue of the Department of Defense's use of taxpayer funds. We continue to believe that government funding to support private activities which exclude persons on the basis of their beliefs is unconstitutional. Indeed, such religious tests are antithetical to basic American values -- values including fairness, respect for the religious liberty of all persons and neutrality in the use of government funds.

However, no such review was ever requested.

Much of the issue became moot when the BSA announced in May 2008 that it was looking for a different permanent location for the national Scout jamborees, beginning with the one scheduled for 2013. The move was due to reasons outside of the lawsuit, including a more favorable summer climate, the ability to host a world jamboree, and off-year use as a high adventure base, along with the reduced need for the DOD to use the jamboree as a training opportunity due to recent operations in the Middle East. A site was found in Fayette County, West Virginia on private land. The Summit Bechtel Family National Scout Reserve will host all future national Scout jamborees, as well as serving as the BSA's fourth high adventure base. However, future involvement of the military in supporting jamborees at The Summit is likely due to the recruiting and training opportunity it affords DOD.
