= Chartered organizations of Scouting America =

All Scouting America units are owned and operated by chartered organizations. Of the 40,732 units (Scouts BSA troops, Cub Scout packs and Venturing crews) and 1,496,790 youth members in 2010:

- 65% of all youth members are chartered to faith-based organizations
- 23.5% of all youth members are chartered to civic organizations
- 11.5% of all youth members are chartered to educational organizations

Each unit is chartered by a local branch of an organization, not at the national level. The following tables combine all chartering organizations that fall into a religious denomination or national organization.

The following table lists chartered organizations (originally divided into faith-based groups, civic groups, then educational groups) by number of registered youth:

2013 Chartered Organizations associated with Scouting America
Name of Organization	Total Units	% Total Units	Total Youth	% Total Youth
The Church of Jesus Christ of Latter-day Saints	37933	36.99%	437160	17.98%
United Methodist Church	10703	10.44%	349614	14.38%
Catholic Church	8131	7.93%	259297	10.67%
Parent-teacher groups other than PTAs	3076	3%	126207	5.19%
Presbyterian Church (U.S.A.)	3520	3.43%	119879	4.93%
Lutheran churches	3728	3.64%	111483	4.59%
Private schools	2579	2.51%	91828	3.78%
Baptist churches	3532	3.44%	91526	3.76%
Groups of citizens	2633	2.57%	84497	3.48%
American Legion and American Legion Auxiliary	2477	2.42%	64864	2.67%
Lions Clubs International	2200	2.15%	60671	2.5%
Parent-Teacher Association/Parent Teacher Organization	1473	1.44%	60171	2.47%
Business and industry	2555	2.49%	57266	2.36%
Episcopal Church (United States)	1180	1.15%	41340	1.7%
Unnamed community organizations	1503	1.47%	41180	1.69%
Rotary International	1289	1.26%	40996	1.69%
United Church of Christ	1154	1.13%	36194	1.49%
VFW, Auxiliary, Cootie	1078	1.05%	30686	1.26%
Community churches	1009	0.98%	30114	1.24%
Christian Church (Disciples of Christ)	1083	1.06%	30113	1.24%
Fire departments	1156	1.13%	29752	1.22%
Kiwanis International	857	0.84%	26587	1.09%
Elks lodges (BPOE)	794	0.77%	21892	0.9%
Unnamed churches	802	0.78%	21804	0.9%
Community centres	818	0.8%	19661	0.81%
Boys & Girls Clubs of America	547	0.53%	16628	0.68%
Nonprofit agencies	570	0.56%	15286	0.63%
Church of Christ	495	0.48%	13559	0.56%
Athletic booster clubs	353	0.34%	11201	0.46%
Playgrounds, recreation centers	379	0.37%	9561	0.39%
Chamber of commerce, business associations	303	0.3%	8892	0.37%
Homeowner associations	242	0.24%	8786	0.36%
Optimist International	244	0.24%	8300	0.34%
Masons - Eastern Star	260	0.25%	8018	0.33%
Evangelical/independent churches	299	0.29%	7740	0.32%
YWCA, YMCA	257	0.25%	7362	0.3%
Church of God	207	0.2%	4354	0.18%
Reformed Church in America	124	0.12%	3921	0.16%
Church of the Nazarene	154	0.15%	3841	0.16%
Jewish synagogues and centers	146	0.14%	3268	0.13%
Church of the Brethren	101	0.1%	2614	0.11%
Islam, Muslim, Masjid	75	0.07%	2226	0.09%
African Methodist Episcopal Church	128	0.12%	2053	0.08%
Christian Methodist Episcopal Church	91	0.09%	2004	0.08%
The Salvation Army	101	0.1%	1721	0.07%
Community of Christ	66	0.06%	1718	0.07%
Buddhist Churches of America	69	0.07%	1698	0.07%
Assemblies of God USA	74	0.07%	1620	0.07%

This table gives more information about which type of units are sponsored by which Chartered Organizations, but is more out of date than total units/total youth table:

Scouting America traditional Scouting membership as of December 2007 — top 25 chartered organizations
Organization	Packs	Cub youth	Troops	Scout youth	Crews	Vtr youth	Total units	Total youth
The Church of Jesus Christ of Latter-day Saints	9959	135115	18726	199141	8028	66473	36713	400729
United Methodist Church	5307	232758	5201	125989	1187	9673	11695	368420
Roman Catholic Church	4617	189985	3878	97185	905	10141	9400	297311
Parent-teacher groups other than PTA	3911	162534	874	21527	340	8671	5125	192732
Groups of citizens	2454	85060	1249	24297	1035	20159	4738	129516
Baptist churches	2114	69296	1969	33813	350	3467	4433	106576
Lutheran churches	1875	71680	1888	46834	436	3710	4199	122224
Presbyterian churches	1531	68556	1893	53031	408	3514	3832	125101
Business and industry	1432	42328	931	17298	1096	13712	3459	73338
Private schools	1568	46883	698	15171	804	30458	3070	92512
American Legion	1248	45762	1220	23023	311	4130	2779	72915
Lions Clubs International	1288	48539	1224	24174	190	1996	2702	74709
Other community organizations	922	30192	680	14671	814	16421	2416	61284
Parent-Teacher Associations	1779	73075	330	6336	41	971	2150	80382
Community centers	725	17521	509	9268	211	4444	1445	31233
Rotary International	625	27061	618	15570	179	3225	1422	45856
Fire departments	607	21636	583	11499	217	1889	1407	35024
United Church of Christ	565	24039	653	16224	119	966	1337	41229
Episcopal Church	551	24167	608	17261	161	1666	1320	43094
Christian Church (Disciples of Christ)	571	21648	584	12038	131	1027	1286	34713
Source: Boy Scouts of America Membership Report
