= Boy Scouts of America Equal Access Act =

US legislation

- Long title: An Act to prohibit discrimination against the Boy Scouts of America and other designated youth groups in access to public school facilities.
- Enacted by: the 107th United States Congress

Citations
- Public law: Pub. L. 107–110
- Statutes at Large: 115 Stat. 1425

Codification
- Acts amended: Elementary and Secondary Education Act of 1965
- Titles amended: 20 U.S.C. § 7905
- U.S.C. sections amended: Sec. 9525 in the No Child Left Behind Act

Legislative history
- Introduced in the House as H.Amdt.65 by Van Hilleary on May 23, 2001; Signed into law by President George W. Bush on January 8, 2002

The Boy Scouts of America Equal Access Act was passed to prevent State and Federal agencies from reducing their support for the Boy Scouts of America (and other youth organizations) based on their policies. The bill was passed in the wake of a number of controversies involving the Boy Scouts of America, such as their exclusion of gay people and atheists, and subsequent attempts to limit government support of the organization.

In particular, the bill states that no school receiving Department of Education funds:

"shall deny equal access or a fair opportunity to meet to, or discriminate against, any group officially affiliated with the Boy Scouts of America, or any other youth group listed in title 36 of the United States Code (as a patriotic society), that wishes to conduct a meeting within that designated open forum or limited public forum, including denying such access or opportunity or discriminating for reasons based on the membership or leadership criteria or oath of allegiance to God and country of the Boy Scouts of America or of the youth group listed in title 36 of the United States Code (as a patriotic society)."

Schools are not required to allow access to the Boy Scouts or similar organizations if they do not have a designated open or limited public forum, that is, if they do not provide meeting space for any outside groups.

The bill was included as Sec. 9525 in the No Child Left Behind Act, which was signed into law on January 8, 2002.
