= Welsh v. Boy Scouts of America =

U.S. Court of Appeals case

- Court: United States Court of Appeals for the Seventh Circuit
- Full case name: Mark G.A. Welsh, a minor, and Elliott A. Welsh, his father and next friend v. Boy Scouts of America and Boy Scouts of America West Suburban Council # 147
- Argued: Nov. 13, 1992
- Decided: May 17, 1993
- Citation: 993 F.2d 1267 (7th Cir. 1993)

Case history
- Prior history: 742 F. Supp. 1413 (N.D. Ill. 1990); 787 F. Supp. 1511 (N.D. Ill. 1992)

Court membership
- Judges sitting: Walter J. Cummings, Jr., John Louis Coffey, Diane Pamela Wood

Case opinions
- Majority: Coffey, joined by Wood
- Dissent: Cummings

Laws applied
- Title II of the Civil Rights Act of 1964

Welsh v. Boy Scouts of America, 993 F.2d 1267 (7th Cir. 1993), was a decision by the United States Court of Appeals for the Seventh Circuit that upheld the right of private organizations to discriminate on the basis of religion when establishing their own membership standards.

In 1989, six-year-old Mark Welsh, after receiving a flyer advertising membership, attempted to sign up for Tiger Cubs, the Boy Scouts of America's Scouting program for six- and seven-year-olds. To become a member of the Tiger Cubs, each child must have an "Adult Partner", typically a parent, who also becomes a member of the organization. Mark's father, Elliott Welsh, an agnostic, informed a BSA official that he did not want to sign the "Declaration of Religious Principles" section of the adult application. The Boy Scouts of America, therefore, denied Mr. Welsh membership, thereby also denying Mark membership. One year later, when Mark had reached the age of eligibility for Cub Scouts (who do not require Adult partners), he was still denied admission into the Scouting organization as he refused to repeat the phrase "to do my duty to God and my country" in the Cub Scout Promise.

The Welshes sued in 1990, alleging that the defendant organization was a place of public accommodation practicing unlawful religious discrimination under Title II of the Civil Rights Act of 1964.

A panel of U.S. District Court judges, Diane Pamela Wood, John Louis Coffey and Walter J. Cummings, Jr. heard the case. On May 17, 1993, the Court ruled against the Welshes in a 2 to 1 decision delivered by Judge Coffey, holding that Boy Scouts of America did not qualify as a place of public accommodation under Title II because it is not an "establishment" that "serves the public," and that the Boy Scouts does not constitute a "place of exhibition or entertainment" in the sense Congress envisioned when drafting Title II. The majority's opinion was based purely on the statute and did not reach the Constitutional question.

Judge Cummings dissented, arguing that because the Americans with Disabilities Act of 1990, expanded the number of establishments in its definition of "places of public accommodation," this court should have expanded Title II to include membership organizations. Judge Cummings explained, "My inclination would have been to hold that the Scouts could exclude atheists under a line of freedom of association decisions suggesting that individuals may form groups in the pursuit of political, social, economic, educational, religious and cultural ends."

In 1993, the U.S. Court of Appeals upheld the ruling, and the U.S. Supreme Court declined to hear the case.
