= Barnes-Wallace v. Boy Scouts of America =

Court case concerning gay rights

Lori and Lynn Barnes-Wallace, Michael and Valerie Breen v. City of San Diego and the Boy Scouts of America - Desert Pacific Council
- Court: United States Court of Appeals for the Ninth Circuit
- Full case name: Barnes-Wallace v. Boy Scouts of America
- Argued: June 20th 2010
- Decided: December 20th 2012

Case history
- Prior history: 2003 ruling by the District Court in favor of the plaintiffs

Holding
- The leases do not violate the No Aid Clause or the No Preference Clause of the California Constitution, or the federal Establishment Clause

Court membership
- Judges sitting: William C. Canby, Jr., Andrew J Kleinfeld, Marsha S. Berzon

Case opinions
- Majority: William C. Canby, joined by Marsha S. Berzon
- Concurrence: Andrew J Kleinfeld

Barnes-Wallace v. Boy Scouts of America was a case involving the City of San Diego's relationship with the Boy Scouts of America.

Plaintiffs Lori and Lynn Barnes-Wallace, a lesbian couple, joined Michael and Valerie Breen, an agnostic couple, in suing the City of San Diego and the Boy Scouts of America. Both couples are the parents of Scout-aged sons, but had never tried to use the facilities.

The Boy Scouts of America has policies forbidding atheists, agnostics, and formerly had policies forbidding gays, from participating in the organization. Since 1957, the City of San Diego has leased part of the city's Balboa Park to the Boy Scouts of America for the price of $1 per year. In 2000, the Breens and the Barnes-Wallaces, aided by the American Civil Liberties Union, sued the city, alleging that the lease was unconstitutional.

In 2003, the District Court agreed and ruled in favor of Barnes-Wallace. The case was appealed to the Ninth Circuit Court of Appeals who reversed the decision in 2012 in favor of the Boy Scouts. "There is no evidence the city's purpose in leasing the subject properties to the Boy Scouts was to advance religion, and there is abundant evidence that its purpose was to provide facilities and services for youth activities," wrote Judge William C. Canby Jr. .

In 2013, the plaintiffs decided not to appeal the ruling in favor of the Boy Scouts, thus ending the suit.

== Background information ==
The City of San Diego has leased property to more than 100 nonprofit organizations for little or no cash rent to provide for the "cultural, educational, and recreational enrichment of the citizens of the City." Many of those leases involve parkland from which the City benefits by saving on maintenance costs.

A number of other leases involve property in residential and commercial zones. The lessees under the San Diego policy are diverse, ranging from the YMCA and the Jewish Community Center to the Vietnamese Federation of San Diego and the Black Police Officers Association. A number of churches are among the lessees.

The issue in this case involves two of these leases, between the City and the Boy Scouts for dedicated parkland in Balboa Park and Mission Bay Park (which includes Fiesta Island). The Boy Scouts of America is a nonprofit charitable organization that received a congressional charter in 1916 "to promote, through organization, and cooperation with other agencies, the ability of boys to do things for themselves and others, to train them in scoutcraft, and to teach them patriotism, courage, self-reliance, and kindred virtues."

All youth members and adult leaders must subscribe to the Scout Oath and Law. Together, these entail acknowledging a duty to God, and recognizing reverence as a virtue. The bylaws of the BSA include the Declaration of Religious Principle, which is printed in BSA publications such as the youth and adult applications and the various leader handbooks.

The Boy Scouts of America maintains that no member can grow into the best kind of citizen without recognizing an obligation to God and, therefore, recognizes the religious element in the training of the member, but it is absolutely nonsectarian in its attitude toward that religious training. Its policy is that the home and organization or group with which the member is connected shall give definite attention to religious life. Only persons willing to subscribe to these precepts of the Declaration of Religious Principle and to the Bylaws of the Boy Scouts of America shall be entitled to certificates of membership.

The original lease for Camp Balboa was entered into in 1957 for a period of 50 years. This lease enabled the Boy Scouts to build a recreational facility and administrative offices for the Desert Pacific Council (now San Diego-Imperial Council) of the Boy Scouts. The Boy Scouts also built nine campsites, made extensive improvements to the property, and maintains all of the facilities of Camp Balboa. These facilities are available, for a nominal usage fee, to all community groups and individuals on a first-come, first-served reservation basis.

In 1987, the City entered into a 25-year lease with the Boy Scouts for a half acre parcel of public parkland located on Fiesta Island in Mission Bay Park. The Fiesta Island Facility Committee, which was composed of more than 40 organizations serving youth in the San Diego area, had identified the Boy Scouts as the entity best able to provide the funding for construction and maintenance of a community aquatic park, and to run its operations. In lieu of cash rent, the Boy Scouts committed to build the San Diego Youth Aquatic Center on Fiesta Island.

The Aquatic Center that BSA built is used by a wide variety of other groups serving youth. The lease states that the Boy Scouts "can use no more than 75% of all available aquatic activities up to 7 days prior." Both leases include nondiscrimination clauses prohibiting the Boy Scouts from discriminating in access to the properties against non-scouting individuals and organizations based on religion and sexual orientation. There have been no instances of a non-scouting organization or individual being discriminated against when requesting access to either facility.

The Boy Scouts of America has policies forbidding atheists and agnostics from participating in the organization. Until 2013 and 2015, it banned openly gay youth and leaders respectively.

In December 2001, prior to the lease's expiration date, the city renewed the lease for an additional 25 years, with an option to renew for an additional 15-year term. The terms of the renewal lease require the Boy Scouts to spend at least $1.7 million over the next seven years on improvements, remodeling, and new construction.

== District Court ==
In 2000, the Plaintiffs sued the city, aided by the American Civil Liberties Union (ACLU). They alleged that the lease was unconstitutional.

The case was filed in the United States District Court, Southern District of California. The official title is LORI & LYNN BARNES-WALLACE; MITCHELL BARNES-WALLACE; MICHAEL & VALERIE BREEN; and MAXWELL BREEN, Plaintiffs, v. BOY SCOUTS OF AMERICA; CITY OF SAN DIEGO; and BOY SCOUTS OF AMERICA — DESERT PACIFIC COUNCIL. Case No. 00CV1726 J (AJB).

The State of California filed an amicus brief in support of the plaintiffs. The United States Department of Justice and the American Civil Rights Union, a non-partisan legal policy organization, submitted an amicus brief on behalf of the Boy Scouts.

In 2003, Judge Napoleon A. Jones Jr. of the United States District Court for the Southern District of California ruled that the Boy Scouts of America is, by its own admission a religious organization — and therefore that the non-market rate lease was in violation of the Establishment Clause of the Constitution. A subsequent settlement between the ACLU and the City of San Diego provided for the Scouts' continued ability to use the facilities.

While the City of San Diego had been a co-defendant, after the 2003 decision and a failed appeal the city council withdrew from the lawsuit and agreed to a $950,000 settlement to the ACLU to cover legal fees. The City Attorney issued a statement regarding the decision, stating that "During the course of the case, however, and without forewarning the City as to its position, the Boy Scouts admitted in court documents that it was in fact a 'religious organization.'" and that "The Boy Scouts have repeatedly and pointedly refused to support the City in helping to pay any of the potential attorney's fees involved in this case. They want the City taxpayers to continue to argue the case even though they have acknowledged that they are a religious organization and even though they refuse to share in the potentially enormous attorney's fee award that will be ultimately awarded to plaintiffs who have already prevailed in Judge Jones' ruling noted above."

== Ninth Circuit ==
On appeal, the Federal Court ruled in favor of the Boy Scouts in 2012. "There is no evidence the city's purpose in leasing the subject properties to the Boy Scouts was to advance religion, and there is abundant evidence that its purpose was to provide facilities and services for youth activities," wrote Judge William C. Canby Jr.

== See also ==
- Curran v. Mount Diablo Council of the Boy Scouts of America
