= Scouts for Equality =

- Abbreviation: SFE
- Formation: June 7, 2012
- Dissolved: December 31, 2020
- Purpose: Advocacy
- Region served: United States
- Founders: Zach Wahls; Jonathan Hillis
- Founding Members: Brad Hankins; Justin Bickford; J. Justin Wilson; Justin Paul Wilson
- Executive Director: Justin Paul Wilson
- Main organ: Board of Directors
- Website: www.scoutsforequality.org

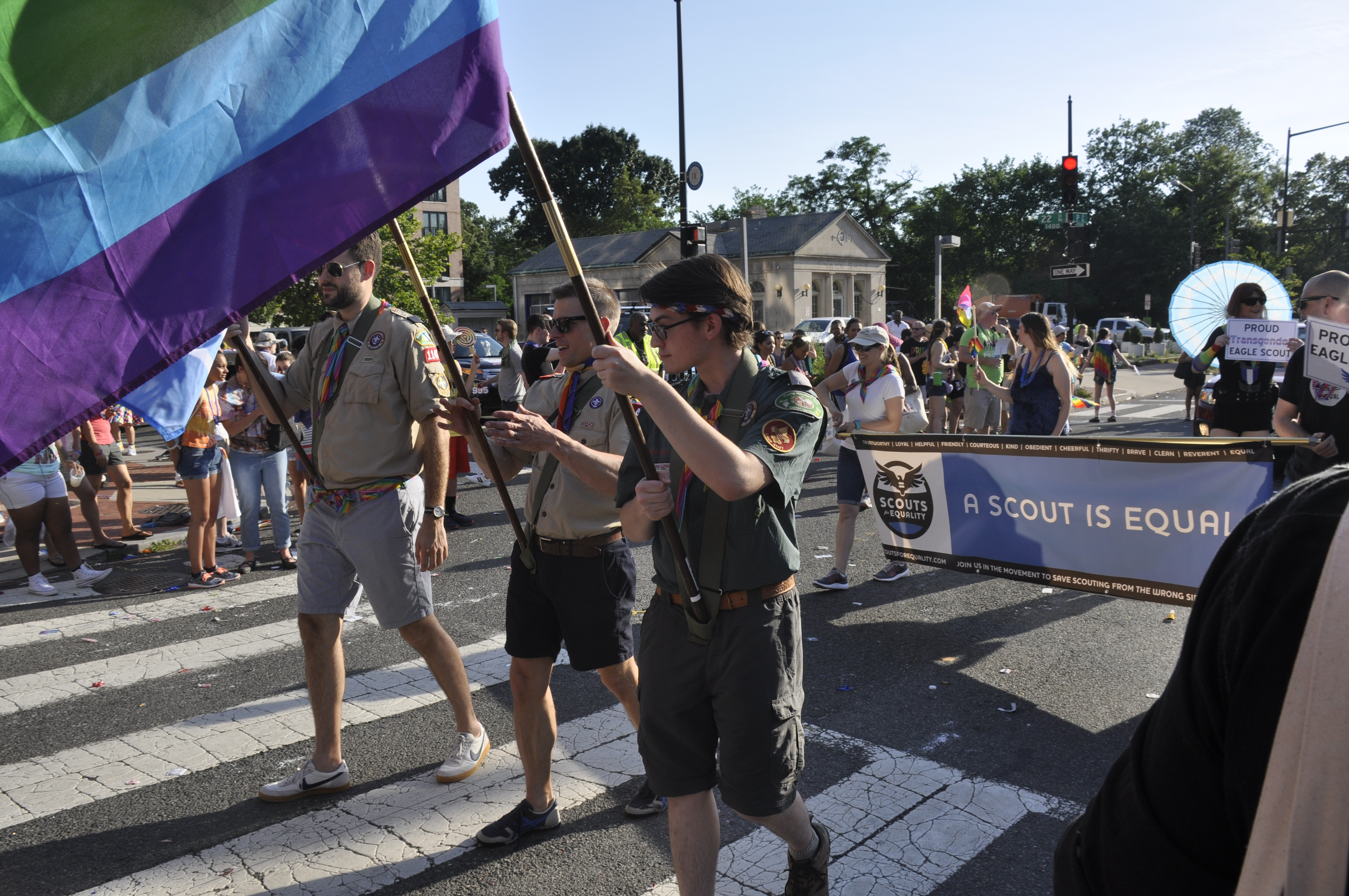
Scouts carrying a Scouts for Equality banners at 2017 Capital Pride parade.

Scouts for Equality (SFE) was an American advocacy organization that advocates for equal treatment within the Boy Scouts of America (BSA) for all scouts and scout leaders, regardless of sexual orientation. On July 17, 2012, the BSA reaffirmed a policy, first established in 1991, which prohibited "known or avowed" gay scouts and scout leaders from participating in the organization.

On May 23, 2013, the BSA approved a resolution to remove the restriction denying membership to youth on the basis of sexual orientation alone (effective January 1, 2014), but maintained the national ban on gay scout leaders. Scouts for Equality continues to advocate for an end to the BSA's requirement that scout leaders be heterosexual. In late May 2015, Robert Gates, the president of the BSA, called for an ending of the ban on gay scouting leaders.

== History ==
In April 2012, Jennifer Tyrrell, a lesbian Den Mother from Ohio, was ousted from her son's Cub Scout Pack. A friend sent her story to GLAAD (formerly the Gay and Lesbian Alliance Against Defamation), which introduced her to Change.org, an online petition platform. Ms. Tyrrell's petition asking for reinstatement gathered 275,000 signatures in a matter of days. Zach Wahls—a straight Eagle Scout who rose to national prominence after a video of his testimony before the Iowa legislature about his lesbian parents became YouTube's top political video in 2011—delivered Ms. Tyrrell's petition to senior BSA leadership at their annual national meeting in late May 2012.

As a continuation of their work in delivering this petition to the BSA, Mr. Wahls and Jonathan Hillis—a former BSA Executive Board youth member and a fellow straight Eagle Scout—founded Scouts for Equality (SFE), an organization of Scouts opposed to the BSA's ban on gay Scouts and Scouters.

One month after the founding of SFE, the BSA publicly reaffirmed their ban on gay members and leaders. In the wake of that reaffirmation, Scouts for Equality led a nationwide campaign to highlight both the devastating impact of the ban on youth and adults, both gay and straight, and the detrimental long-term effects on the BSA's future. The campaign received wall-to-wall coverage when Scouts for Equality broke the story of Ryan Andresen, an all-American youth from California who was denied his Eagle Scout award because he was gay. Amid mounting pressure—both Mitt Romney and Barack Obama called on the BSA to end their ban—the Boy Scouts of America decided, after more than thirty years, to publicly address the issue and announced in February 2013 that the ban would be put up to a vote of their 1,400-member National Council in May 2013.

Scouts for Equality had a three-month window to influence this vote, and put together a team of twenty-three full-time campaign staff with a heavy emphasis on field organizing. In April, the BSA announced that the resolution to be voted on in May would not address their ban on gay adults and would only concern gay youth. However, instead of proposing a “local option” that would have allowed individual councils to enforce the ban at their discretion, this “youth option” would be nationwide. On May 23, 2013, the Boy Scouts of America's National Council voted 61.3% in favor of ending the BSA's longstanding ban on gay youth.

SFE is now executing a long-term three-pronged strategy for growing inclusive Scouting, which was announced in December 2013:

1. End discrimination against adult leaders within the BSA.
2. Create a safe culture of inclusiveness for all youth through bullying prevention programs and ensuring the new membership policy is implemented consistently across all levels of the BSA.
3. Grow an inclusive Boy Scouts of America by increasing membership and creating new inclusive Scouting units.

On December 31, 2020, the Board of Directors dissolved Scouts for Equality by a unanimous vote.

== Campaigns ==
SFE encourages and provides support to local Boy Scout councils and troops to decline to participate in enforcing BSA's anti-gay policy, and tracks such actions, like the Northern Star Council (Minnesota), and Connecticut Rivers Council.

The organization tallies the many donors who have withdrawn or threatened to withdraw their support, such as United Way of Cleveland and United Way of the Capitol Region (Pennsylvania).

The organization also maintains a list of Eagle Scouts who return their awards to the BSA in protest of the organization's ban on non-heterosexual members and leaders, though it does not recommend returning the award. In October 2012, Scouts for Equality announced that more than 300 Eagle Scouts had returned their awards. Scouts for Equality has also collected Eagle Scout awards submitted in protest of the BSA's policies and forwarded them to Ryan Andresen, a 17-year-old California scout who completed the requirements for Eagle Scout but whose award was denied by his scoutmaster because he is gay.

== Impact ==
Primarily by gathering electronic signatures through Change.org, SFE has successfully lobbied organizations that provide the BSA with financial support. SFE had collected over 500,000 signatures by August 2012 and announced passing the 1 million signature milestone on November 23, 2012.

Intel Corporation, one of BSA's largest corporate donors, withdrew its funding in September 2012, though it said its decision was not based on the campaign by Scouts for Equality but on changes in its own corporate policies. Another major donor, United Parcel Service, terminated their support to BSA in November 2012 after extensive lobbying by SFE members and supporters.

As of November 19, 2012, SFE has begun petitioning Verizon, who through their foundation gave $315,000 to the Boy Scouts of America in 2010, in violation of their eligibility requirements.

On May 21, 2015, BSA President Robert Gates called for an ending of the ban on gay scouting leaders. He stated that the BSA "cannot ignore the social, political and judicial changes taking place in our country....We must deal with the world as it is, not as we might wish it to be. The status quo in our movement's membership standards cannot be sustained." Gates called on the board to consider his proposal, but stopped short of asking the board to vote that same day. Gates also stated local jurisdictions would be able to decide membership according to their beliefs. The announcement was praised by Zach Wahls, the Human Rights Campaign, and Scouts for Equality, among others.

SFE and their work have been endorsed by a number of organizations. Faith organizations that have publicly announced their support include:

- Unitarian Universalist Association
- United Church of Christ
- Union for Reform Judaism

== See also ==
- Scouting for All
- Corporate Equality Index
