= Yeaw v. Boy Scouts of America =

1997 Supreme Court of California case

- Supreme Court of California

Holding
- The Boy Scouts of America are not considered a "business establishment" and do not fall under the provisions of California's Unruh Civil Rights Act. Decision of the Court of Appeal is reversed.

Laws applied
- Unruh Civil Rights Act (Cal. Civil Code § 51)

Yeaw v. Boy Scouts of America was a high-profile case filed in 1997 before the Supreme Court of California to determine whether the Boy Scouts of America is a business establishment within the meaning of the Unruh Civil Rights Act (Civ. Code, § 51) or has the right to exclude girls from membership.

== Background ==
Katrina Yeaw attempted to join her twin brother Daniel's Boy Scout Troop No. 349 in the Golden Empire Council in her hometown of Rocklin, California. When she was rejected due to the fact she is female, she filed suit against the Boy Scouts of America, accusing them of discrimination.

== See also ==
- Scouting in California
- Scouting/USA
