= Southwest Michigan Council =

Local council of Scouting America

- Owner: Boy Scouts of America
- Country: United States
- Founded: 1973
- Defunct: August 14, 2012

Southwestern Michigan Council is a defunct local council of the Boy Scouts of America that served youth in Kalamazoo, Michigan serving Northern Van Buren County, Kalamazoo County, St. Joseph County, Branch County, and Western Calhoun County

== History ==
The Southwest Michigan Council was a creation of several mergers culminating 1973, composing of the Fruitbelt Area Council, Nottawa Trails Council, and a previous iteration of the Southwest Michigan Council.

Based in Kalamazoo, this city has hosted a council since 1915 when it was known just as the Kalamazoo Council. The Council Number has always been #270. In 1927 "AREA" was added to the council name. That name stuck for only two years before the council again changed its name to the Kalamazoo Fruitbelt Area Council. This time the name lasted eight years before additional territory and a desire for a shorter name prompted the council to change the name to just the Fruitbelt Area Council in 1937. In 1973 there was a three way merger that formed the current Southwest Michigan Council. Battle Creek MI had their own council dating back to 1915 with a council of the same name. In 1927 "AREA" was added to the Council (always designated Council # 256). In 1956 the council in Battle Creek changed their name to Nottawa Trails Council which lasted until the 1973 merger. The other component of the 1973 merger came from the small lakefront town of Saint Joseph which had hosted the Southwestern Michigan Council (#258) since 1941. Before that Saint Joseph had hosted the Berrien County Council as far back as 1919. In 1923 the name was changed to the Benton Harbor & Saint Joseph Council and then in 1929 the name was edited to become the Berrien-Cass Area Council. Records show the Council ending in 1941 when its final name of Southwestern Michigan Council (#258) was adopted. The name aptly describes the council which has most of that corner of the state (with La Salle Council in Indiana picking up two of the border counties at the extreme lower tip of the state). Finally, there were several other early councils of note in the town of South Haven, there was briefly an unnumbered council from 1917 to 1918. Similarly in 1923 the town of Sturgis had the Sturgis Council (#279) until 1929 when the name changed to Fort Hill Council, where it lasted another two years before being merged with the Kalamazoo-Fruit Belt Area Council. The town of Dowagiac had a council (#263) from 1917 to 1927 before merging with the Benton Harbor & Saint Joseph Council.

In 2012 the Southwest Michigan Council was merged with the Great Sauk Trail Council to form the Southern Shores Field Service Council as a part of the Area 2 Project, which created four Field Service Councils in the lower peninsula of Michigan, under the Michigan Crossroads Council

=== Organization ===
The council is administratively divided into districts:

- Nottawa Trails District
- Pathfinder District
- Wabano District

=== Properties ===
Rota-Kiwan Scout Reservation was a 199-acre property located in Texas Township just outside of the Kalamazoo city limits. Rota-Kiwan was developed in 1921, and was the third-oldest camp in Michigan. Rota-Kiwan was composed of two camps, Camp Madron, which is the Boy Scout and Webelos camp, and Camp T. Ben Johnson, which is the Cub Scout camp. The camp served Scouts and Scouters from throughout the state -- many from Ohio, Indiana, Illinois and Canada. The Michigan Crossroads Council (MCC) closed the camp in December 2019 against the wishes of local scouts, volunteers and residents of Texas Township. Kalamazoo County had planned to develop the property into a county park.

=== Order of the Arrow ===
Nacha-Mawat served as the council Order of the Arrow lodge. The name means "three into one." The name was adopted after the merging of the Carcajou, Mandoka, and Wakazoo Lodges. At this time, to foster brotherhood and reduce strife, the fleur de lis was chosen as the lodge totem. The Lodge adopted a policy that each member will get two lifetime lodge flaps for each honor in the OA: red for ordeal, blue for brotherhood, and silver Mylar for vigil. This policy was adopted in 2006 and was suspended in (approximately) 2009 when the lodge supply of these flaps ended. There are also trader flaps which are unrestricted; these 'trader flaps' are now the only flaps issued by the lodge. The Nacha-Mawat totem is now the Blue Heron. The Lodge has achieved quality lodge in 2010, and 2011. It brings outstanding service projects to Rota-Kiwan Scout Reservation.

== See also ==
- Scouting in Michigan
