= Michigan International Camporee =

- Owner: Michigan Crossroads Council
- Location: Camp D-Bar-A
- Website http://www.micamporee.org/

The Michigan International Camporee is a camporee attended by Scouts from the United States, Canada and other counties. It is hosted by the Michigan Crossroads Council of the Boy Scouts of America and is recognized by the World Organization of the Scout Movement (WOSM). The theme is international friendship and fellowship.

The Michigan International Camporee provides an opportunity for local and international Scouts to attend a Jamboree at a fraction of the cost of traditional International Scout Jamborees. One patrol of Scouts from any country outside the U.S. and Canada may attend free of charge. A small fee is charged for local Scouts and Venturers, but is still a fraction of the cost of participating in a World Scout Jamboree.

== Frequency ==
Generally every four years (1997, 2000, 2004, 2008, 2012, 2016), contingents of Scouts, both all boys and mixed boys and girls, from over 20 countries, gather for fun and various activities in Michigan. Scouts are hosted in various Michigan Communities and then come together to camp. The next Michigan International Camporee community hosting will be held from Monday July 17 to Sunday July 23. Scouts will then spend from Saturday July 23-Sunday July 31 at Trout Lake Subcamp of D-Bar-A Scout Ranch, 880 East Sutton Road, Metamora, Michigan.

== Activities ==
Events include music and dance performances, camping, campfires, pioneering, team building events, international cooking, scoutcraft, shooting sports, water sports, Native American activities, and international festival day.

== Participants ==
Past Michigan International Camporees have included contingents from:

- Argentina (2008)
- Australia (1997, 2000, 2004, 2008, 2012)
- Austria (2000, 2004, 2008, 2012)
- Belize (2004, 2008)

Bonaire (2012)

- Canada (1997, 2000, 2004, 2008, 2012)
- Costa Rica (2000, 2008, 2012, 2016)

Cruacao (2012)

- Czech Republic (2004, 2008)
- Denmark (1997, 2000, 2008)
- Egypt (2004, 2012)

Ethiopia (2012)

- Finland (1997)
- Ghana (1997, 2000, 2008, 2012)
- Guatemala (2004)
- Honduras (2008,2012)
- Hungary (1997, 2000, 2004, 2008, 2012)
- Ireland (2000, 2004, 2008, 2012)
- Isle of Man (2000, 2004, 2008, 2012)
- Jamaica (2000, 2004)
- Jordan (2000, 2004, 2008)
- Kazakhstan (2008)
- Kenya (2004, 2008, 2012)

Republic of Korea, 2008, 2012)

- Mexico (1997, 2000, 2004, 2008, 2012)
- Mongolia (2004)
- Netherlands Antilles (1997, 2000, 2004, 2008)
- New Zealand (2000)
- Peru (1997, 2000)
- South Korea (2008)
- Romania (1997)
- Saudi Arabia (2008)
- Taiwan (2008)
- Slovakia (1997, 2000)
- Sweden (1997, 2000)
- Switzerland (1997, 2000, 2012)

Taiwan (2008, 2012)

- Tanzania (1997, 2008, 2012)
- Philippines (2000)
- Trinidad and Tobago (1997, 2004, 2008)
- Uganda (1997, 2000, 2004, 2008, 2012)
- United Kingdom (1997, 2000, 2008, 2012)
- Zimbabwe (1997, 2000, 2004).

== See also ==
- Mackinac Rendezvous
- President Gerald R. Ford Field Service Council
- Scouting in Michigan
