= Scouting in Michigan =

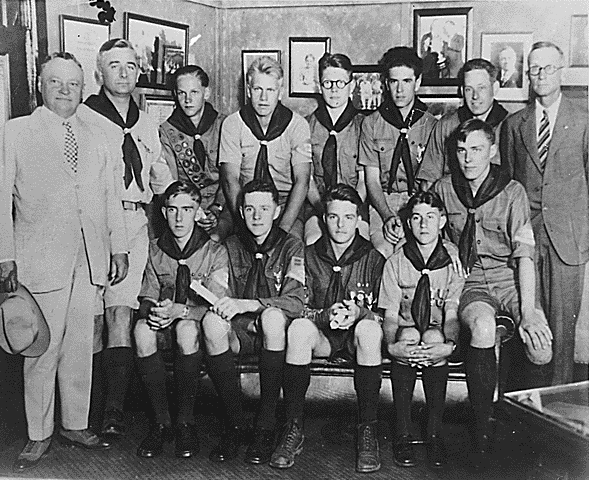
Michigan Eagle Scouts in 1929, including President Gerald Ford at age 16

Scouting in Michigan has a long history, from the 1910s to the present day, serving thousands of youth in programs that suit the environment in which they live.

== Beginning years (1910–1950) ==
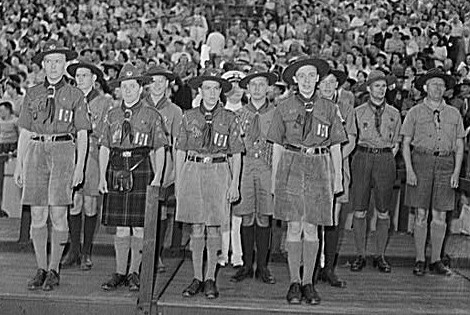
Blitz Scouts from England at the University of Detroit stadium July 1942. Photograph by Arthur Siegel.

The YMCA in Michigan was organizing Scout troops based on Scouting for Boys as early as 1909.

In 1910 the first scout troop in West Michigan, Rockford Troop 1 was formed by Merritt Lamb. Shortly after the formation of Rockford Troop 1, Merritt formed Muskegon Troop 1 and the Muskegon Council. Merritt Lamb was the 13th Eagle Scout in the nation, and the first person in Michigan to receive the Bronze Cross for Lifesaving.

The Michigan Forest Scouts were formed by the State of Michigan in 1911. This group was formed in response to a number of late 19th century and early 20th century forest fires, and were effectively "auxiliary fire wardens".

In 1914, St. Stanislaus Boy Scouts of America (BSA) Troop No. 1 obtained its charter as the first organized troop in Bay City Michigan and the first admitted to the Bay City Council (chartered in 1917). Scout activities had been going on for several years prior to this. Father Ladislaus P. Krakowski, pastor of St. Stanislaus Kostka, and his assistant Father Frank Kozak encouraged the official link, per the St. Stanislaus Kostka Church Centennial 1874-1974 book of 1974.

The Forest Scouts crested at 5,000 members and ended in 1916.

In 1929, a group of 8 Eagle Scouts including Gerald R. Ford participate in the first Mackinac Island Honor Guard.

In 1933, the National Order of the Arrow Lodge Meeting was held at the Owasippe Scout Camps outside Whitehall, Michigan.

In 1950, the Gerber baby food company donated the funds to purchase Gerber Scout Reservation (now of the Michigan Crossroads Council) to BSA.

=== Mackinac Island Honor Guard Program ===
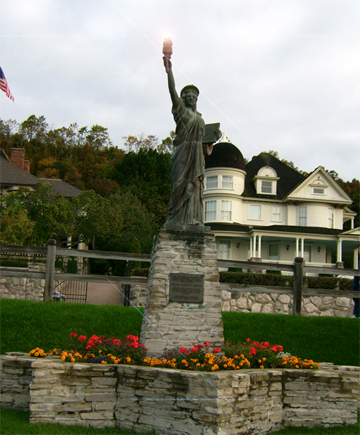
One of the 200 Lady Liberty statues donated by the Boy Scouts of America is located on Michigan’s Mackinac Island in historic Haldimand Bay.

The Mackinac Island Governor's Honor Guard (Mackinac Island Honor Scouts) program is one of the few elite programs of its kind. Starting in 1929, a select group of eight Eagle Scouts from across the state, including young Gerald Ford, to serve as honor guards in Fort Mackinac. In 1934, as a Civilian Conservation Corps project, Scout Barracks were built just outside the fort walls. The service camp has been known by many names. Originally, it was named to honor the Governor of Michigan at the time. It was also known as the Mackinac Island Eagle Scout Honor Guard until it was opened up to scouts of all ranks. In 1974, the program was expanded to include Girl Scouts. Similar programs are the Utah National Parks Council Honor Guard and Greater Niagara Frontier Council Honor Guard.

As participants in the program, scouts raise and lower twenty-six flags on the island, serve as guides, and complete volunteer service projects during their stay. Duties on the island include raising and lowering flags each day, serving downtown and in Fort Mackinac as guides, and doing a variety of service projects to better Mackinac Island State Park.

A unique tie that Scouting has with Mackinac Island can be seen overlooking the Mackinac Island harbor. The Mackinac Island Statue of Liberty replica was dedicated in 1950 by the Boy Scouts of America. The statue is one of 200 donated by the BSA in 1950 to celebrate the 40th anniversary of Scouting. The program was called Strengthen the Arm of Liberty and the Mackinac statue is the only one located in Michigan. Due to the unique role that BSA Scouts play on Mackinac Island during the summer, the statue is a lasting testament to the island’s scouting heritage. The statue was restored by the Mackinac Island American Legion in 2013 and was rededicated on July 4, 2014.

Between Memorial Day and Labor day, the island is the summer home to 14 scout troops. Of the six Girl Scout troops, one is from Michigan Shore to Shore Council, two from Heart of Michigan Council, and three from Southeastern Michigan Council. Of the eight BSA councils, Bay-Lakes Council, Southern Shores Field Service Council, and Great Lakes Field Service Council all provide one troop, President Gerald R. Ford Field Service Council is home to two units, while Water and Woods Field Service Council has three honor troops.

== Middle years (1950–1990) ==
The Bass Lake lone troop Scout camp was part of the Owasippe Scout Reservation operated by the Chicago Area Council. The Bass Lake camp was a single camp on a small (approximately 600 feet (180 m) wide) lake in the Owasippe reservation. A single troop would take over the entire camp, usually for a two-week period, preparing all their own food and overseeing all aspects of the camp life. Active in the 1950s and 1960s, Bass Lake camp is no longer in use.

International Girl Scouts of the USA gatherings named Senior Roundups were held every three years from 1956 until 1965. The first one was held at Milford, Michigan in 1956, attended by 5,000 girls.

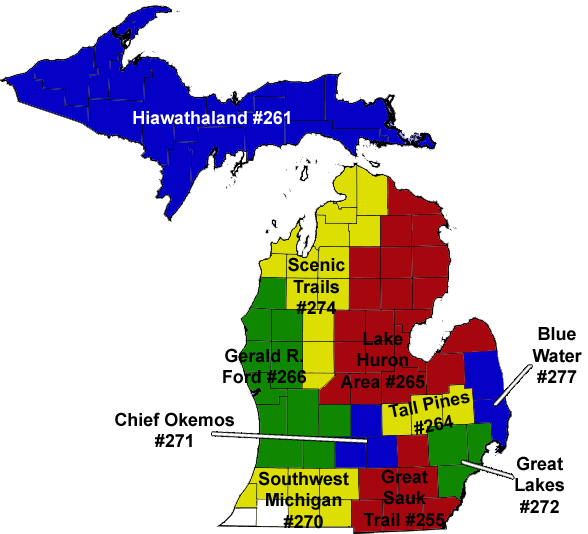
The 10 BSA Councils of Michigan prior to the Michigan Crossroads Council.

As the scouting program grew across the state, local councils began to be consolidated into larger councils to manage the increased number of scouts and units. By the end of the 20th century, Michigan was home to 14 Boy Scout councils and 14 Girl Scout Councils.

The 1986 National Order of the Arrow Conference was held at Central Michigan University in Mount Pleasant.

== Recent history (2000–present) ==
The 2006 and 2012 National Order of the Arrow conferences (NOACs) were held at Michigan State University in East Lansing. The host lodge in 2006 was Gabe-shi-win-gi-ji-kens Lodge #374. 8,003 Arrowmen from around the country came by plane, train, and bus to participate in the Order's 2006 NOAC; Over 600 people from the state of Michigan were present during the 5 day event.

At the beginning of 2010, there were 12 Boy Scout Councils and 14 Girl Scout Councils in Michigan. In 2008, many Girl Scout Councils were merged in the state, resulting in the 5 present day Girl Scouts councils. In 2012, the Boy Scouts of America consolidated nine of its councils across the state into the Michigan Crossroads Council.

In 2020, Michigan Crossroads Council made a decision to merge their Field Service Councils to create one central Council.

== Boy Scouts of America ==
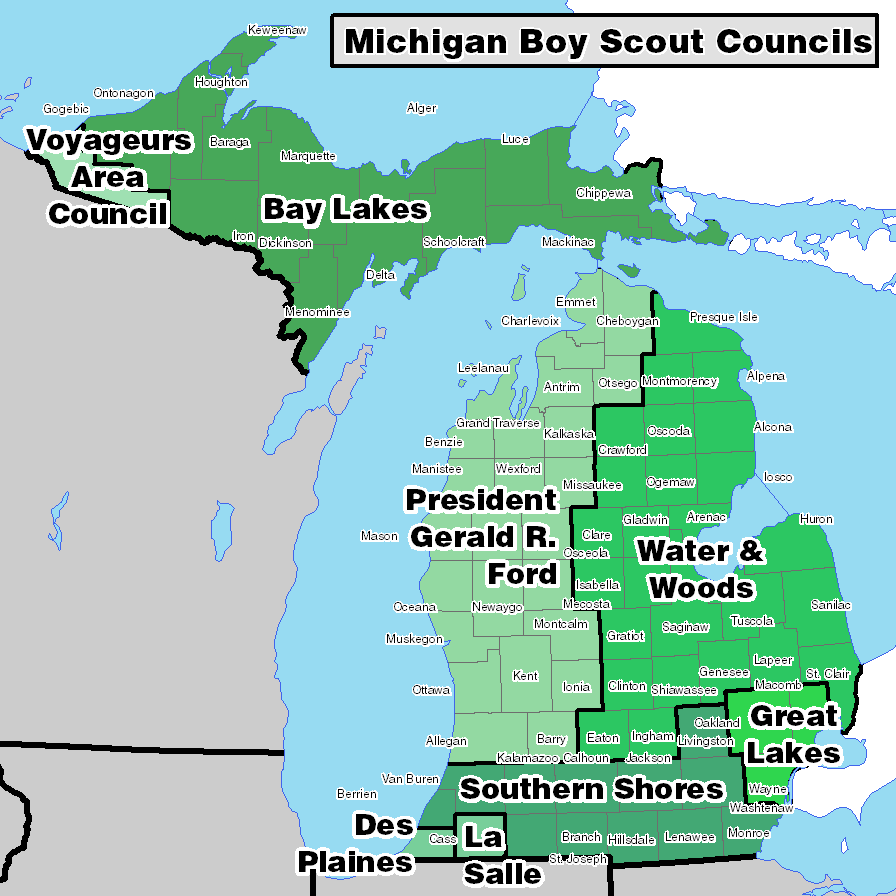
BSA Councils serving Michigan (2012).

=== Michigan Crossroads Council ===
Due to a population decline in the 2000s, with a corresponding loss in youth members, the Boy Scouts of America decided that Michigan's councils should consolidate to help save costs and raise membership. In October 2010, the Area 2 Project was launched to develop a sustainable origination for the 21st Century. In 2012 the Area 2 project committee presented a "Crossroads Recommendation" to the Central Region. As a result of the recommendation, nine councils were merged into the Michigan Crossroads Council, which was then divided into four field service councils.

- Great Lakes Field Service Council serves Scouts in Metro Detroit.
- President Gerald R. Ford Field Service Council serves Scouts in western and northern Michigan.
- Southern Shores Field Service Council serves Scouts in Southern Michigan.
- Water & Woods Field Service Council serves Scouts in eastern and central Michigan.

In 2020, Michigan Crossroads Council made a decision to merge their Field Service Councils to create one central Council.

=== Bay-Lakes Council ===
The Bay-Lakes Council is headquartered in Appleton, Wisconsin, and also serves Scouts in Michigan. It is merged with Hiawathaland Council, retaining the Bay-Lakes name.

Camp Hiawatha was opened in 1967 on property formally known as Wolfe's Lodge. There were several small cabins and a larger lodge on the "family side" and little else. The "camp side" was nothing but trees, brush and ferns as tall at the campers. The first campers that summer faced a real challenge. No electricity, telephones, running water and very little shelter.

Today Camp Hiawatha is 800 acres (3.2 km^{2}) and encircles Bunting Lake, a 60-acre (240,000 m^{2}) lake in the middle of Hiawathaland National Forest in the heart of the Upper Peninsula of Michigan. The closest towns are Chatham and Munising, Michigan.

Camp Hiawatha is now under the administration of Bay-Lakes Council, becoming Bay-Lakes' third Scouts BSA resident camp, joining Bear Paw Scout Camp and Gardner Dam Camps, and fifth overall resident camp, joining Cub Scout World Camp Rokilio and Twin Lakes Webelos Resident Camp.

=== La Salle Council ===
La Salle Council serves Scouts in Indiana and Michigan.

=== Voyageurs Area Council ===
Headquartered in Hermantown, Minnesota, Voyageurs Area Council serves Scouts in Minnesota, Wisconsin, and Michigan

== Girl Scouts of the USA ==
Map of Girl Scout Councils in Michigan

There are five Girl Scout councils in Michigan.

=== Girl Scouts Heart of Michigan ===
Girl Scouts Heart of Michigan serves 30,000 girls in central Michigan. It was formed on October 1, 2008 by the merger of Glowing Embers Girl Scout Council, Girl Scouts of The Huron Valley Council, Girl Scouts - Irish Hills Council, and Girl Scouts of Michigan Capital Council.

- Camp Deer Trails, Harrison, MI
- Camp Linden, Linden, MI
- Camp Merrie Woode, Plainwell, MI
- Camp O' the Hills, Brooklyn, MI
- Camp Oak Hills, Harrison, MI
- Camp Wacousta, Wacousta, MI
- Barbara Osterman Cabin, Alma, MI
- Jane Harris Cabin, Mt. Pleasant, MI
- Program & Training Center, Kalamazoo, MI

=== Girl Scouts of Michigan Shore to Shore ===
Headquartered in Grand Rapids, Michigan, the Girl Scouts of Michigan Shore to Shore serves just over 6,000 members in northwestern Michigan (not including the Upper Peninsula). It was formed by the merger of Girl Scouts of Michigan Pine and Dunes Council, Girl Scouts of Michigan Trails, Girl Scouts of Crooked Tree, and Girl Scouts of Mitten Bay.

Camps:

- Camp Anna Behrens - Greenville, MI
- Camp Woodlands - Alpena, MI
- Sherwood Lodge at Camp Anna Behrens - Greenville, MI
- Betsy Cutler House - Muskegon, MI
- Grand Haven Little House - Grand Haven, MI
- Ludington Little House - Ludington, MI

=== Girl Scouts of Northern Indiana-Michiana ===
Headquartered in Fort Wayne, Indiana serves girls in Berrien and Cass counties.

=== Girl Scouts of The Northwestern Great Lakes ===
Headquartered in Green Bay, Wisconsin, this dividing serves girls in the Upper Peninsula.

- Camp Birch Trails - in Rock Falls, 8 miles N of Merrill, WI
- Camp Cuesta - by Bailey's Harbor, West of Traverse City on the across Lake Michigan past South & North Manitou Islands.
- Camp Del O'Claire - Weston, WI
- Camp Nawakwa - NW of Cornell, WI
- Camp Pow-Low - Gwinn, MI near Marquette, MI in waterfall country
- Camp Sacajawea - Wisconsin Rapids, WI on Lake Tapawingo.
- Camp Winnecomac - NE of Appleton in Kaukauna, WI surrounded by 1,000 Island Nature Preserve.
- Appleton Service Center - Appleton, WI
- Eau Claire Service Center - Eau Claire, WI
- Green Bay Service Center - Green Bay, WI

=== Girl Scouts of Southeastern Michigan ===
Headquartered in Detroit, Michigan, it was formed by a merger on January 1, 2009 of Girl Scouts Fair Winds Council, Girl Scouts of Macomb County - Otsikita Council, Girl Scouts of Metro Detroit, and Girl Scouts - Michigan Waterways Council.

- Camp Hawthorn Hollow - Columbus, MI
- Playfair Program Center - near Lexington, MI

== Scouting museums ==
- E. Urner Goodman Scout Museum, Owasippe Scout Reservation, Blue Lake Township, Michigan
- Thomas D. Trainor Boy Scout Museum
- Washington Scouting Museum, Washington, Michigan

== See also ==
- Scouting in Ontario
- Duck Lake State Park
- Michigan International Camporee
- Mackinac Rendezvous
