= Jackson Council =

Jackson Council may be:

- Jackson Council (Michigan)
- Jackson Council (Mississippi)
