= Great Sauk Trail Council =

Local council of Scouting America

- Owner: Boy Scouts of America
- Headquarters: Ann Arbor, Michigan
- Country: United States
- Founded: July 1, 1993
- Defunct: August 14, 2012

The Great Sauk Trail Council is a defunct local council of the Boy Scouts of America which was based out of Ann Arbor, Michigan serving Livingston County, Washtenaw County, Jackson County, Lenawee County, Hillsdale County, Monroe County, Eastern Calhoun County, and the city of Flat Rock, in Michigan.

== History ==
The Great Sauk Trail Council was a result of a merger in 1993 between the Wolverine Council and Land o' Lakes Council. The new council was known as the Wolverine-Land o' Lakes Council until the Great Sauk Trail Council name was decided upon later that year.

In 2012, the Great Sauk Trail Council was merged with the Southwest Michigan Council to form the Southern Shores Field Service Council as a part of the Area 2 Project, which created four Field Service Councils in the lower peninsula of Michigan, under the Michigan Crossroads Council.

== Organization ==
The council was administratively divided into districts:

- Chief Lenape Trails District serving Jackson County, Lenawee County, Hillsdale County, and Eastern Calhoun County
- Three Fires District serving Livingston County
- Running Waters District serving Monroe County and the city of Flat Rock
- Huron Trails District serving Washtenaw County

== Camps ==
Camp Munhacke was a 120-acre (0.49 km^{2}) camp located roughly 15 minutes north of Chelsea, Michigan, located on Bruin Lake. Camp Munhacke was a camp for the Southern Shores Field Service Council, hosting Cub Scout Resident Camp during the summer. The camp featured four cabins, 33 campsites, three pavilions, a dining hall with industrial style kitchen, archery range, rifle range, fire bowl and waterfront. It also bordered the Pinckney Recreation Area and connects with the Potawatami Trail. The camp hosted 2,000 campers in a six-week season, and approximate 15,000 through the course of the year.

This was a year round facility used for Cub Scouts Resident camp in the summer and Boy Scouts/Cub Scouts camping/events at other times. Events included Cub Scout/Boy Scout Training events, shooting sport events, and had hosted many events for the District and Order of the Arrow and weekend camping.

Camp Muscootah is a 40-acre (0.16 km^{2}) camp five minutes west of Hillsdale, Michigan. The camp offers 13 campsites, an open pavilion, and a large fire bowl.

Camp Teetonkah is a 210-acre (0.85 km^{2}) camp near Grass Lake, Michigan. Opened in 1912, it is the second-oldest Boy Scout camp in America. The camp can be found on Jackson County's Big Wolf Lake and features a new dining hall, three cabins, four Adirondack shelters and seven campsites.

Camp Teetonkah is one of the oldest Boy Scout camps still operating in the United States. Originally, the camp consisted of about 50 acres (200,000 m^{2}). Teetonkah has operated on the same land since 1913, but the land was owned privately until the then-Jackson Council took official title in 1917, stated in the deed to the camp. The facility now operates as a weekend camp. According to a 1921 news clipping, the name "Tee-Tonk-Ah" means "Big Lodge"

In 1913, the Jackson Council held its first summer camp at Teetonkah, and continued to hold them for 81 years. In 1994, due to the lack of Scouting unit support as evidenced of fewer than 150 participants for the whole few-week season, and continuing financial losses, the summer camp operation closed.

Today, Teetonkah is available for use by all BSA groups. They can use the facility for activities besides weekend campouts. Training events include "National Youth Leadership Training" and "Wood Badge", advanced adult leader training, outdoor leadership training, Jamboree shakedowns, multiple training groups, and shooting sport events.

During 2006-07, a dining hall was built that included an industrial kitchen and a 250-person capacity dining area. Also at the camp are 14 unisex showers for adult males and females, and restrooms. The building has seating area for another 250 people under a pavilion attached to the dining hall. From 2008-11, the camp had a select lumber "harvest" under a new forestry plan. This allowed for the creation of seven campsites. In 2009, water was reactivated to two cabin areas and one campsite, and, as money permits, the camp plans to have running water in all campsites. In late 2011, oil was discovered on the property, providing much-needed revenue for the property. In 2012, a shooting range was created for the use of high-powered rifles as well as pistols. Five shotgun stands were also added.

On December 12, 2015, the Michigan Crossroads Council Executive Board voted to close Camp Teetonkah and cease its operations by Dec. 31.

Camp Kanesatake is a defunct Boy Scouts of America camp located in Cambridge Township, Lenawee County, Michigan. Camp Kanesatake was built in 1926 and was the Wolverine Council camp until it was sold in 1981.

== Order of the Arrow ==
Manitous Lodge served at the council Order of the Arrow lodge. The name is translated as "Mystic Lodge" in Ojibway, and the lodge totem is the medicine wheel. The four chapters in the lodge, Munhacke, Teetonkah, Tecumseh, and Allohak, correspond in location with their respective districts. The names come from the original lodges found within the council, prior to council mergers.

The lodge annually held four events: Spring Ordeal, Fall Fellowship, an April Work Day and Winter Banquet.

== See also ==
- Scouting in Michigan
