= Midland Council =

Midland Council may be:

- Midland Council (Texas)
- Midland Council (Michigan)
