= President Gerald R. Ford Field Service Council =

Field service council of Scouting America

President Ford Field Service Council
- Owner: Michigan Crossroads Council, Scouting America
- Headquarters: Grand Rapids, Michigan
- Country: United States
- Defunct: 2021
- Scout Executive: Aaron Gach
- Website http://michiganscouting.org/PresidentFord

The President Ford Field Service Council is a field service council of the Michigan Crossroads Council (MCC), a local council of Scouting America.

The President Ford Field Service Council is part of the result of a 2012 merger of nine local councils into Michigan Crossroads Council. The Gerald R. Ford Council and the Scenic Trails Council merged to form the President Ford Field Service Council. The field service council structure is unique within the BSA and necessitated by the large geographic area.

== Organization ==
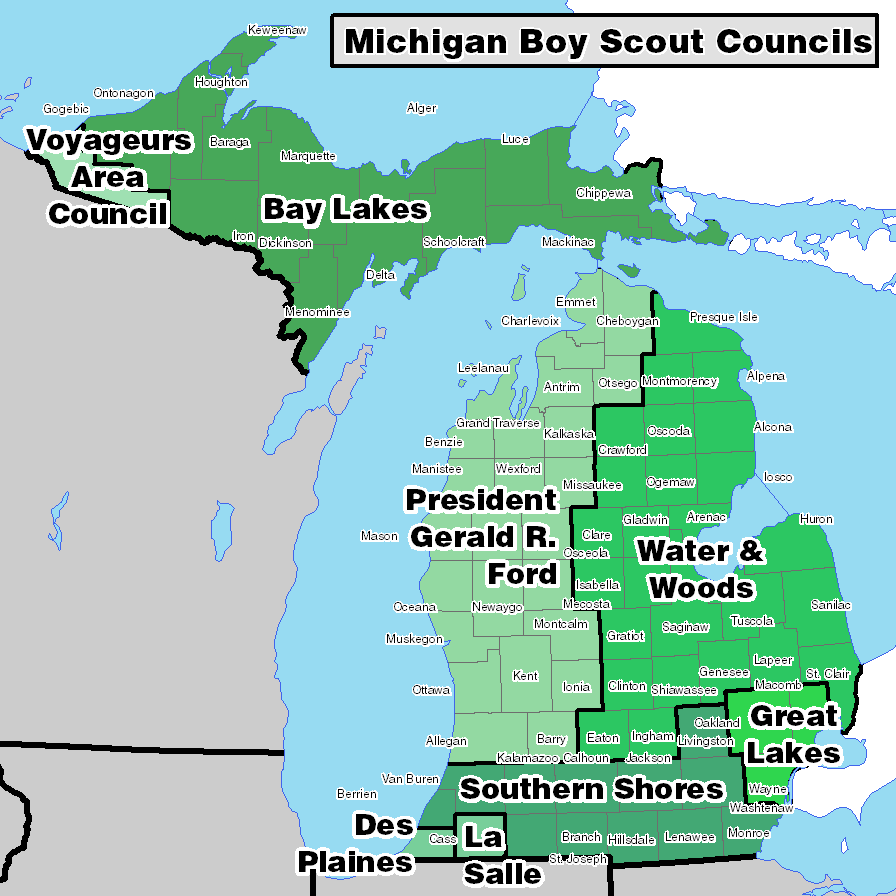
BSA Councils in Michigan. The President Ford FSC serves Scouts in Western Michigan.

The field service council is divided into districts:

- Eagle Spirit District serving youth in the Kent, Ionia, and Barry counties
- Lakeshore District serving youth in the Allegan, Muskegon, and Ottawa counties and school districts of Grandville and Byron Center
- Northern Lights District serving youth in the Alpena, Antrim, Charlevoix, Cheboygan, Emmet, Montmorency, Otsego, and Presque Isle counties
- Scenic Trails District serving youth in the Benzie, Crawford, Grand Traverse, Kalkaska, Leelanau, Manistee, Missaukee, Roscommon, and Wexford counties
- Timber Trails District serving youth in the Lake, Mason, Mecosta, Montcalm, Newaygo, Oceana, and Osceola counties

== History ==
The Gerald R. Ford Field Service Council is a product of the merger of the former Gerald R Ford Council and the Scenic Trails council. This merger occurred in 2012 as a result of the Area 2 Project.

In 2020, Michigan Crossroads Council made a decision to merge their Field Service Councils to create one central Council.

=== Gerald R. Ford Council ===
Gerald R. Ford Council was formed by the merger of Timber Trails Council and Grand Valley Council in 1975, and was known as West Michigan Shores Council until 1995. At that time, the Council was renamed after Gerald R. Ford, 38th President of the United States and an Eagle Scout from Troop 15 (now Troop 215) in Grand Rapids.

== Properties ==
=== Camp Gerber ===
See Gerber Scout Reservation

=== Camp Shawondossee ===
Camp Shawondossee was the former camp of the Grand Valley Council, located on Duck Lake in Muskegon County in Whitehall. The land is now part of Duck Lake State Park.

== Order of the Arrow ==
=== Nataepu Shohpe Lodge (2012-2020) ===
Nataepu Shohpe Lodge is based in the President Ford Field Service Council of west and northwest Michigan. The Lodge is very active and is divided into 8 chapters, the borders of which are the same as the borders of the council's districts. The one exception to the boundaries is within the River Trails District. This district holds two chapters, Wundchenneau and Wa-Wa Esh Ki.

In the lodge's first year the lodge provided over 14,000 hours of service to Gerber Scout Reservation, Greilick Scout Camp, and the west Michigan community. The Lodge holds an annual winter event (in January), a spring event (in May), a fall event (in August), and a strategic planning weekend for the lodge executive committee (in September).

Nataepu Shohpe Lodge was a part of the Order of the Arrow in the Boy Scouts of America. It came from the merger of Nacha Tindey lodge and Indian Drum lodge.

Nataepu Shohpe Lodge has an E.C. (executive committee) which includes a Lodge Chief, Vice Chief of Administration, Vice Chief of Inductions, Vice Chief of Program, Lodge Secretary and Lodge Treasurer. It also has eight (one for each chapter) Chapter Chiefs and numerous committee chairmen. There are monthly or bi-monthly meetings where the members plan upcoming events, report on current events and discuss ideas.

Nataepu Shohpe is a part of Section C-2 which encompasses most of the lower peninsula of Michigan. The other lodges in Section C-2 are Agaming Maangogwan (Water and Woods Field Service Council), Noquet (Great Lakes Field Service Council), and Kishahtek (Southern Shores Field Service Council).

==== Indian Drum Lodge (1939-2012) ====
Indian Drum Lodge was based in the Scenic Trails Council of Michigan. The Lodge was divided into 4 chapters, the borders of which were the same as the borders of the council's districts. The Lodge held an annual winter extravaganza, fall fellowship and spring fellowships.

Indian Drum Lodge was chartered from 1939 up until last year. Indian Drum Lodge had an ecomm (executive committee) which included a Lodge Chief, Lodge Vice Chief of Administration, Lodge Vice Chief of Inductions, Lodge Vice Chief of Activities, Lodge Secretary and Lodge Treasurer. It also had four Chapter Chiefs and numerous committee chairmen.

Indian Drum Lodge was a part of Section C-2B which encompassed most of western and northern Michigan and the upper peninsula.

==== Nacha Tindey Lodge (1975-2012) ====
Nacha Tindey Lodge was based in the Gerald R. Ford Council of west Michigan. Nacha Tindey is Lenni Lenape for "Three Fires". The Lodge was very active and divided into 4 chapters, the borders of which were the same as the borders of the council's districts. Since 1997, its members typically put in over 10,000 hours of service annually to Gerber Scout Camp and the west Michigan community. The Lodge holds an annual winter banquet, two lodge conclaves(This is pretty much the same as a "fellowship". During these conclaves, the Arrowmen would help dismantle Gerber Scout Camp for the winter, or set up for the summer season.)

Nacha Tindey Lodge was chartered from 1975 until 2012. It resulted from the merger of Jibshe Wanagan lodge and Nakida Naou lodge. Nacha Tindey Lodge had an E.C. (executive committee) which included a Lodge Chief, Vice Chief of Administration, Vice Chief of Service, Vice Chief of Program, Secretary and Treasurer. It also has four (one for each chapter) Chapter Chiefs and numerous committee chairmen. There are usually 10 scheduled meetings where the members plan upcoming events, report on current events and discuss ideas.

In the Spring of 2007 Nacha Tindey restructured itself with Gerald R. Ford Council and went from six chapters to four chapters.

In 2001, Nacha Tindey introduced the Takachsin. It is a necklace that is worn to show the Arrowman's achievements and services as well as how long they have been a member.

Nacha Tindey was part of Section C-2B which encompassed most of western and northern Michigan and the upper peninsula.

===== Jibshe Wanagan (1935-1975) =====
Jibshe Wanagan maintained the lodge number 79 and served The Grand Valley Council

===== Nakida Naou (1945-1975) =====
Nakida Naou maintained the lodge number 401 and served the Timber Trails Council.

== See also ==
- Scouting in Michigan
- Mackinac Rendezvous
