= Duck Lake State Park =

Park in Michigan, USA

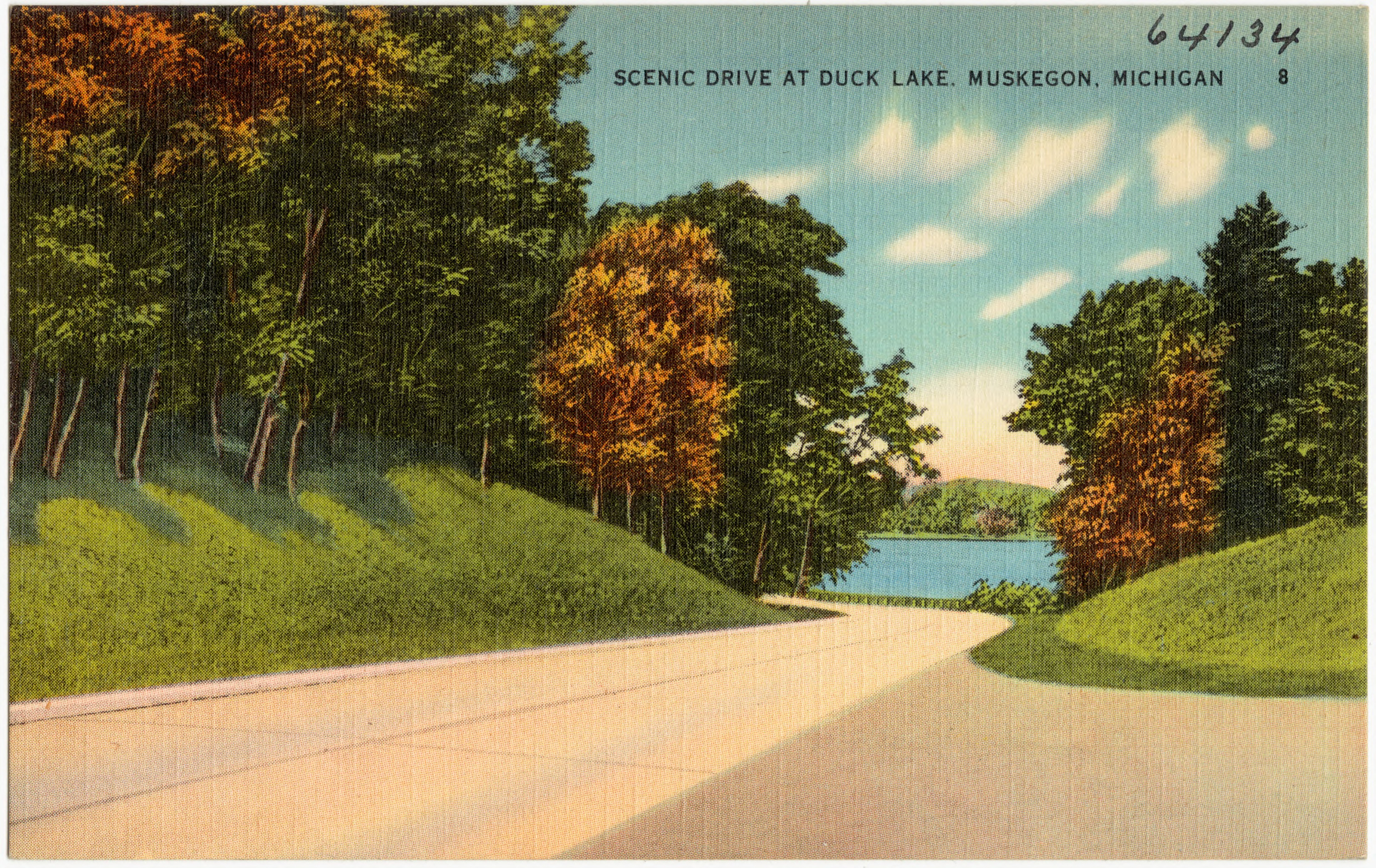
- Duck Lake: 1940s-era postcard view

- Location within Michigan Location within the United States
- Location: Fruitland Township, Muskegon County, Michigan, United States
- Nearest city: Whitehall, Michigan
- Coordinates: 43°20′40″N 86°23′40″W
- Area: 728 acres (295 ha)
- Elevation: 640 feet (200 m)
- Established: 1974
- Administrator: Michigan Department of Natural Resources
- Designation: Michigan state park
- Website: Official website

Duck Lake State Park is a public recreation area covering 728 acres (295 ha) on Lake Michigan five miles (8.0 km) southwest of Whitehall in Muskegon County, Michigan. The state park, which runs along the north side of Duck Lake to Lake Michigan, features a large sand dune. The park's Scenic Drive is part of the Shoreline Trail route in Muskegon County.

== History ==
The Nature Conservancy purchased the land from two Boy Scout organizations. The state removed the remains of the scout camps and built access roads after acquiring the site in 1974. The park was officially dedicated in 1988. In 2005, a new entrance was constructed off Scenic Drive.

== Facilities and activities ==
A beach at the mouth of Duck Lake is a popular spot for swimming and fishing. A half-mile paved trail skirts Duck Lake. The park also offers picnicking, boat launch, snowmobiling, hiking, and hunting.
