= Mackinac Rendezvous =

Mackinac Rendezvous is a BSA event held in the Mackinac region of Michigan, taking place on a weekend in September, every other year, since 1987 (38 years ago).

The Boy Scouts at the Mackinac Rendezvous XIV (2013) set a world record for the most people posed in the shape of a symbol, with 1132 participants forming the shape of the Fleur-de-lis.

== See also ==
- Michigan International Camporee
- President Gerald R. Ford Field Service Council
- Scouting in Michigan
