= Southern Shores Field Service Council =

Former regional division of the Boy Scouts of America

- Owner: Boy Scouts of America
- Country: United States
- Founded: August 14, 2012
- Scout Executive: Melissa Stricherz
- Website http://www.michiganscouting.org/

Southern Shores Field Service Council is a field service council of the Michigan Crossroads Council.

== History ==
=== 2012 Merger ===
The Scouting program in the Lower Peninsula of Michigan saw a drastic drop in membership beginning in the early 2000s. The decrease in population was due to the economy in Michigan and the resulting out-migration of population, jobs and industry. The Area 2 Project was created in 2010 and studied the impact on Scouting and presented the Crossroads Recommendation, which proposed that the ten councils in Michigan merge into one large council. As a result, in 2012, four field service councils were created consisting of former councils.

The Southern Shores Field Service Council is the result of a merger between the Great Sauk Trail Council and Southwest Michigan Council.

=== 2020 Merger ===
In 2020, the Michigan Crossroads Council made a decision to merge its Field Service Councils to create one central Council.

== Organization ==
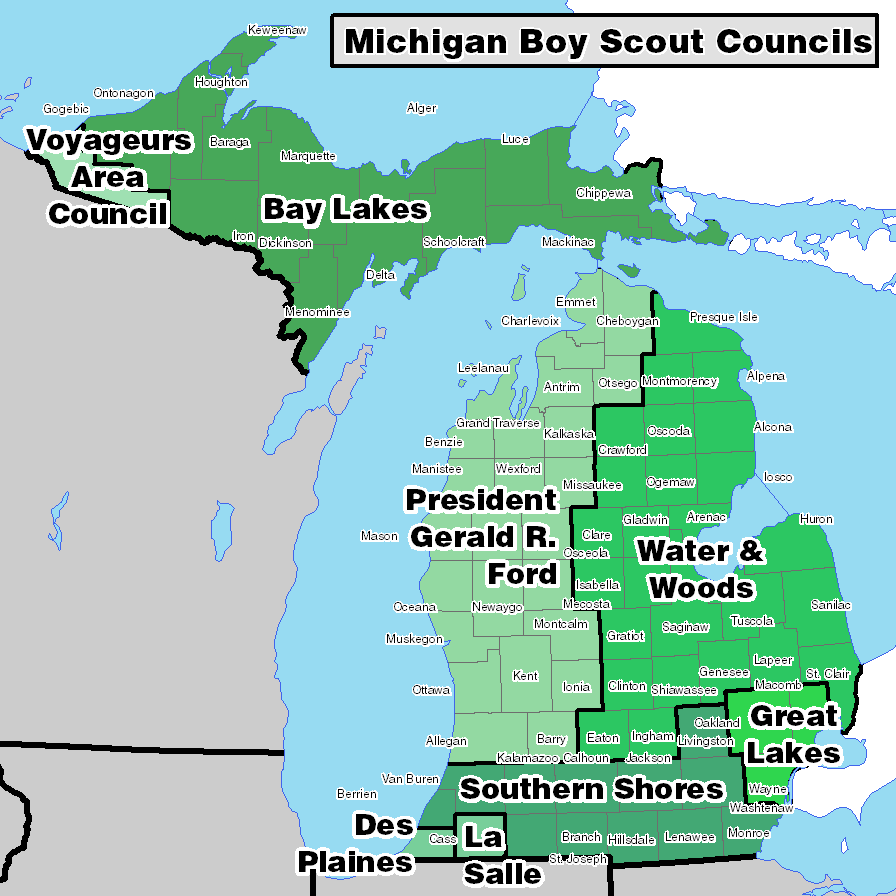
BSA Councils in Michigan. The Southern Shores FSC serves Scouts in southeastern and southwestern portions of Michigan.

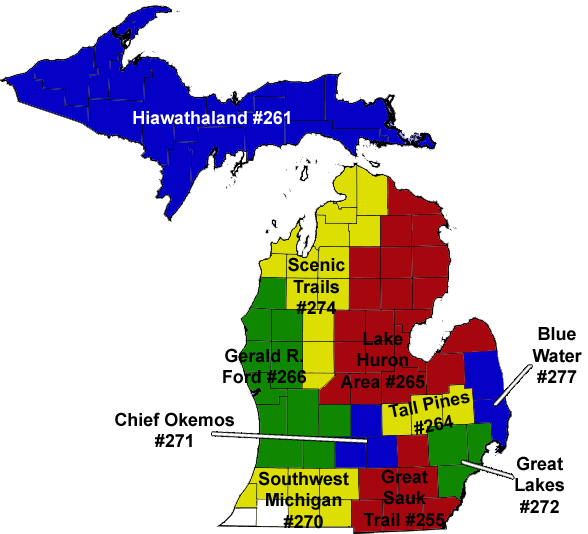
Michigan Boy Scout Councils prior to the Michigan Coordinating Councill

The council is administratively divided into districts:

- Lenape District serving Lenawee County and Hillsdale County
- Three Fires District serving Livingston County
- Running Waters District serving Monroe County and the city of Flat Rock
- Huron Trails District serving Washtenaw County
- Wabano District serving Van Buren County and Berrien County
- Pathfinder District serving Kalamazoo County and St. Joseph County
- Nottawa Trails District serving Western Calhoun County and Branch County
- Cascades District serving Jackson County

== Properties ==
=== Operating as of 2020 ===
==== Camp Teetonkah ====
Located on Wolf Lake in Jackson, MI; Camp Teetonkah claims to be the second oldest scout camp in the United States. It boasts 240 acres of land and currently caters to Cub Scout programs.

=== Closed as of 2020 ===
==== Camp Rota-Kiwan ====
Formerly located in Texas Township south of Kalamazoo, MI; Camp Rota-Kiwan formerly occupied nearly 200 acres of land and was closed by the council in 2019 for financial reasons.

==== Camp Munhacke ====
Formerly located on Bruin Lake in Gregory, Michigan, Camp Munhacke was closed by the council on December 31, 2019, for financial reasons.

==== Camp Kanesatake ====
Formerly located on Washington Lake in Cambridge, MI, Camp Kanesatake was purchased in 1926 and operated for roughly 50 years.

==== Wrights Lake Scout Camp ====
Formerly located in Evart, MI, Wright's Lake Scout Camp was closed by the council after the 1995 season for financial reasons.

== Order of the Arrow ==
=== Kishahtek Lodge (2012–2020) ===
Kishahtek Lodge, maintained the lodge number 88, and served as the Field Service Council's Order of the Arrow Lodge. The name is translated as "Northern Lights" in Lenne Lenape, and the totem is the wolverine.

The lodge was formed from merging Manitous Lodge 88 and Nacha-Mawat Lodge 373 after the Great Sauk Trail Council and Southwest Michigan Council merged into the Southern Shores Field Service Council.

Similar to the Field Service Council, the lodge is divided into chapters, which correspond within district boundaries

- Allohak Chapter in the Huron Trails District. This name comes from a prior lodge which served the Ann Arbor area.
- Carcajou Chapter in the Wabano District. Named after the Carcajou Lodge 373 that served the Southwestern Michigan Council prior to merging with the Fruit Belt Area and Nottawa Trails Councils in 1973. Carcajou Lodge had the Camp Madron Dance Team.
- Lenape Chapter in the Lenape District
- Mandoka Chapter in the Nottawa Trails District. Named after the Mandoka Lodge 315 that served the Nottawa Trails Council prior to merging with the Southwestern Michigan and Fruit Belt Area Councils in 1973.
- Munhacke Chapter in the Three Fires District. This name comes from a prior lodge which served Livingston County
- Tecumseh Chapter in the Running Waters District. This name comes from a prior lodge which served Monroe County
- Teetonkah Chapter in the Cascades District. This name comes from a prior lodge which served Jackson County
- Wakazoo Chapter in the Pathfinder District. Named after the Wakazoo Lodge 203 that served the Fruit Belt Area Council prior to merging with the Southwestern Michigan and Nottawa Trails Councils in 1973.

==== Manitous Lodge (1995–2012) ====
The Manitous Lodge was formed as a result of the merger of the Land'o'Lakes Council and the Wolverine Council, the merger forced the Allohak and Teetonkah lodges to restructure into the new lodge. The Manitous lodge totem was the medicine wheel. Manitous Lodge was the home lodge of the 1995 National Chief Josh Feigelson

===== Allohak Lodge (1973–1995) =====
The Allohak lodge was formed when the Wolverine council absorbed the Portage Trails council. The Allohak lodge totem was the Wolverine.

====== Tecumseh Lodge (1946–1973) ======
The Tecumseh lodge served the Wolverine council from 1946 until its merger in 1973. The lodge totem was a 4-leaf clover due to the lodge's location in the area locally known as the Irish Hills.

== See also ==
- Scouting in Michigan
