= Bay-Lakes Council =

Scouting America council in eastern Wisconsin

Bay-Lakes Council (#635)
- Owner: Scouting America
- Headquarters: Appleton, Wisconsin
- Country: United States
- Founded: 1973
- Scout Executive: James Martin
- President: Tim Feldhausen
- Council Commissioner: Tod Salfai
- Website; Bay-Lakes Council

The Bay-Lakes Council is the Scouting America council serving eastern Wisconsin. Headquartered in Appleton, Wisconsin, it is geographically one of the larger local Scout councils. Bay-Lakes Council #635 was formed on July 1, 1973, the product of a merger between six east Wisconsin councils. The council is served by Kon Wapos Lodge of the Order of the Arrow.

== History ==
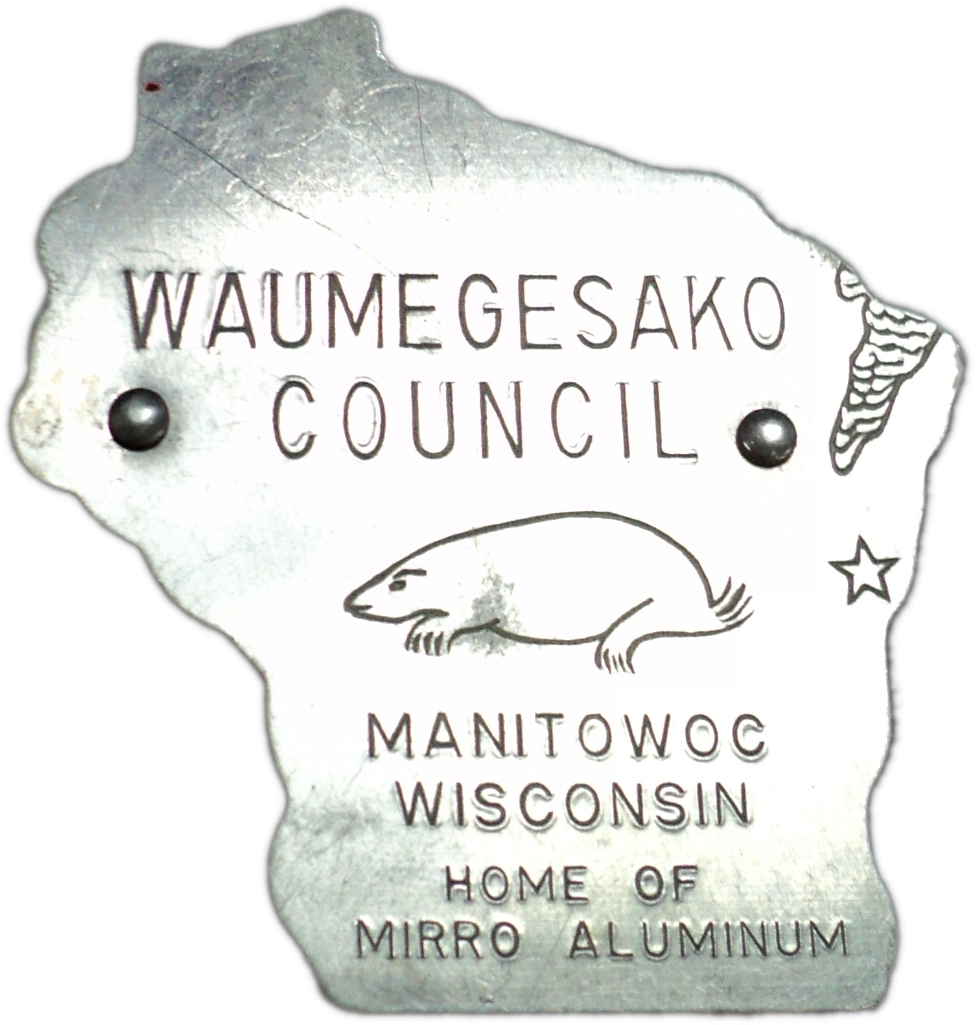
Neckerchief slide from historical Waumegesako Council

The Bay-Lakes Council was formed in 1973 by a merger of the following councils: Badger (based in Fond du Lac), Waumegesako (based in Manitowoc), Nicolet Area (based in Green Bay), Valley (based in Menasha), Twin Lakes (based in Oshkosh), and Kettle Moraine (based in Sheboygan). The Hiawathaland Council joined in 2012. The history of each of these parent councils is depicted below.

Hiawathaland District was transferred to the Michigan Crossroads Council on January 1, 2025.

Among councils that predated the ones that merged into Bay-Lakes, includes Sturgeon Bay Council which was formed in 1918 disbanded in 1919.

Fond du Lac #622 founded 1920	Manitowoc #625 founded 1919	Green Bay founded 1920	Neenah-Menasha founded 1920	Appleton founded 1920	Oshkosh #630 founded 1919	Sheboygan County #632 founded 1919	Marquette #271 founded 1915	Sault Ste. Marie founded 1917
Green Bay ended 1922	Valley #635 merged 1922	Chippewa County #259 name changed 1920
Fox River Valley #635 name changed 1924	Marquette #271 ended 1928	Copper County #260 founded 1923
Badger #622 name changed 1926	Manitowoc County #625 name changed 1929	Green Bay Area #621 founded 1930	Valley #635 name changed 1925	Marquette Area #261 founded 1931	Chippewa Area #256 name changed 1929
Waumegesako #625 name changed 1940	Nicolet Area #621 name changed 1934	Twin Lakes #630 name changed 1935	Kettle Moraine #632 name changed 1935	Hiawatha Area #261 name changed 1933	Iron Range #649 founded 1938	Red Buck #263 founded 1938
Hiawathaland #261 merged 1945
Bay-Lakes #635 merged 1973
Bay-Lakes #635 merged 2012
Transfer of Hiawathaland District to Michigan Crossroads #780; 2025
Bay-Lakes #635; 2025

== Organization ==
Bay-Lakes Council has a professional staff of approximately 20 employees. There are over 7,500 Scouts in the council's 23 counties in Eastern Wisconsin. There are 141 Cub Scout packs, 174 Scouts BSA troops, 17 Venturing crews and 12 Explorer posts and over 3,400 adult volunteers. Bay-Lakes Council is divided into seven districts.

- Gathering Waters District serves parts of Calumet, Winnebago & Waupaca and all of Outagamie and Shawano counties.
- Kettle Country District serves Ozaukee county, and parts of Dodge and Washington counties.
- Lakeshore District serves Calumet, Manitowoc, and Sheboygan counties.
- Ledge to Lakes District serves Fond du Lac, Green Lake, and Marquette counties.
- Northern Lights District serves Marinette, Oconto, and Langlade Counties.
- Twin Lakes District serves Waupaca, Waushara, and Winnebago counties.
- Voyageur District serves Brown, Door, and Kewaunee counties.

== Camps ==
Bay-Lakes Council camps (click on markers for Geohack maps)

=== Bear Paw Scout Camp ===
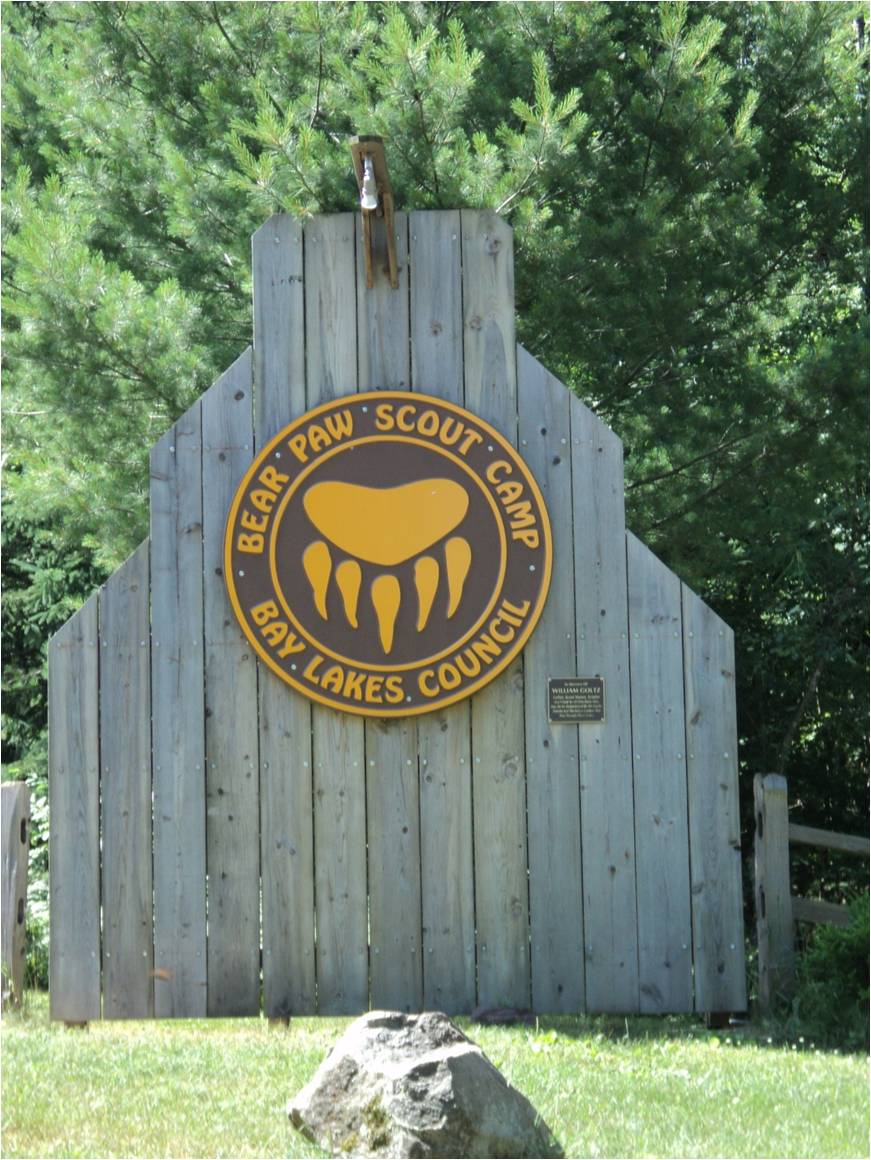
Main entrance to Bear Paw

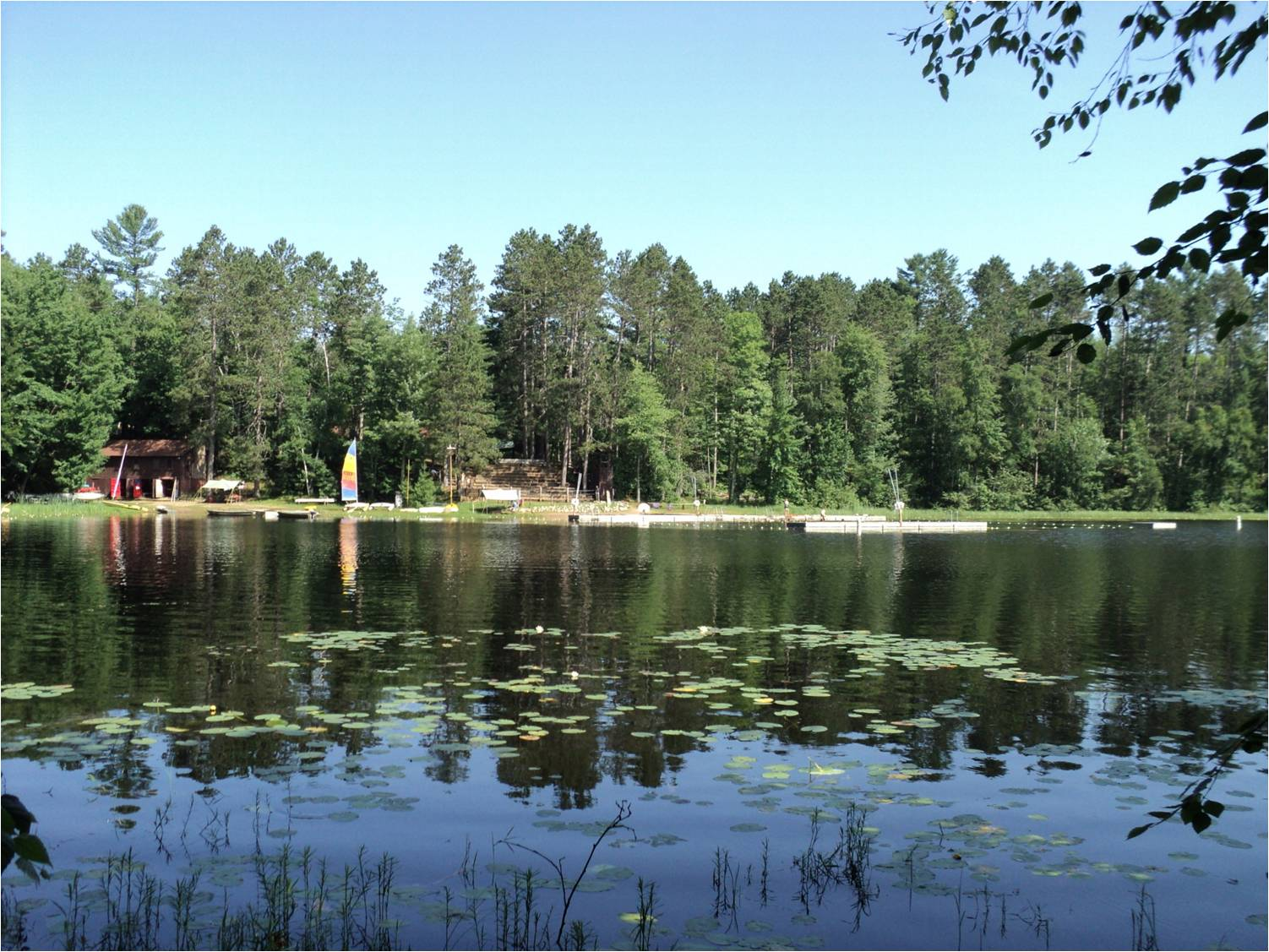
Bear Paw's waterfront, viewed from Chapel Point

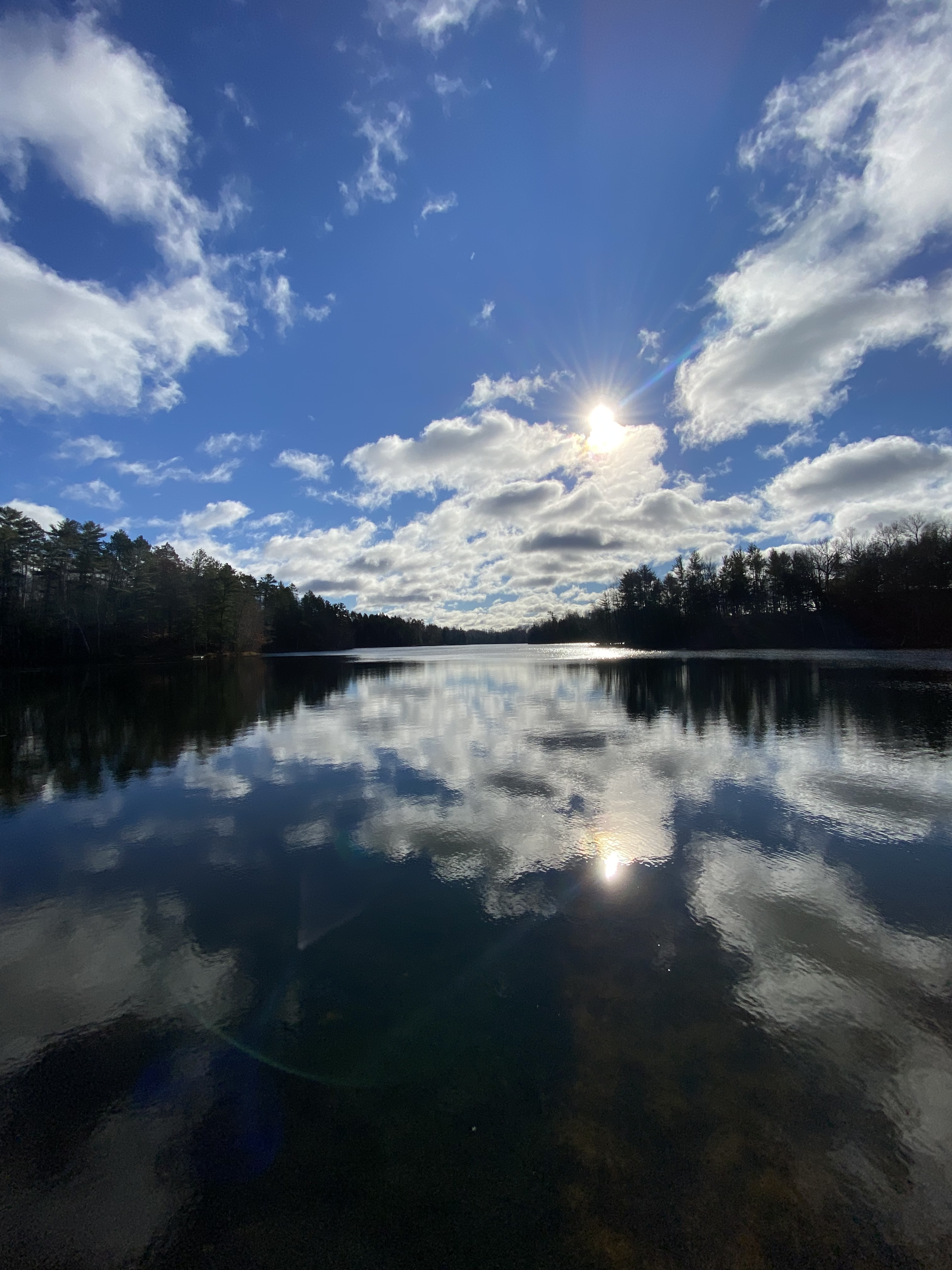
View from the Bear Paw Lake waterfront

Located on Bear Paw Lake 5 miles (8.0 km) east of Mountain, Wisconsin in the Nicolet National Forest, Bear Paw Scout Camp has year-round camping, both indoor and outdoor, but is primarily a week-long resident summer camp for Scouts. In addition to rustic campsites and heated cabins for camping, Bear Paw has several permanent buildings supporting its program areas, a trading post for snacks and memorabilia, an enclosed chapel on a wooded point overlooking the water, a large and modern dining hall, a lakeside fire circle for evening council fires and ceremonies, and a nine-hole disc golf course. Hiking trails range from short, in-camp jaunts to destinations such as Explorer Point to longer treks to Oconto County features such as Lost Mountain, Staff Mountain, and Waupee Rapids. Marked cycling trails up to 50 miles (80 km) long criss-cross the roads in the vicinity of camp.

Besides summer camp weeks, Bear Paw's sixteen campsites and four heated cabins can be rented by Scouts. Some events and programs offered throughout the year include shooting sports, Maple Syrup Days, Cooking merit badge, Paul Bunyan Woodsman Award, geocaching, orienteering, and wilderness search and rescue.

The camp has a website.

- Summer Camp program at Bear Paw Scout Camp, week-long summer resident camping for Scouts BSA.

=== Gardner Dam Adventure Base ===
Opened in 1932, Gardner Dam Adventure Base is located along the Wolf River, near the village of White Lake, in the town of Wolf River, Langlade County. Gardner Dam offers a variety of programs including many high adventure opportunities including rock climbing, bouldering, whitewater tubing, whitewater kayaking, whitewater canoeing, and ATVs. Gardner Dam also offers shooting sports ranges for shotgun, rifle, and archery, as well as a host of trails for hiking and biking. The camp inhabits both sides of the river with one side being dedicated to campsites and the other side being dedicated to the numerous program areas. When Gardner Dam first opened in 1932, it was a dining hall camp. Then in 1970, it changed to a patrol cooking camp for Scout troops where Scouts would pick up their food from the commissary each meal and cook in their campsite. With the change in summer programs to Webelos, a dining hall is going to be erected on the north side of the Wolf River. There is a engineered pond fed directly from the Wolf River. The water flows freely through the pond and is held in by a dam. Because of this design, the water avoids becoming stagnant, because fresh water is constantly being fed from the river. Gardner Dam also has a 35 ft (11 m) climbing tower available for Climbing merit badge and climbing during free time. In 2008 a new shooting sports facility was built. The shooting sports area has a section for both rifle shooting and shotgun trap shooting. The camp is also available in spring, fall, and winter months for Scout troops and non-Scouting groups to come and camp on their own. In the non-summer months, units may stay in either the older Wisconsin Electric lodge, or the newer Wausau Homes Adventure Lodge (WHAL - pronounced Wall), both of which have indoor bathrooms including showers.

The campsites and program areas are home to 13 sessions of four-day, three-night AOL resident camp from June through August, and weekend use by all units the remainder of the year.

- Gardner Dam Adventure Base, a Webelos and Arrow of Light resident camp and offers many high-adventure activities in partnership with Bear Paw Scout Camp

=== Camp Rokilio ===
This camp was founded in 1924 as a Boy Scout Camp. Original funding came from several service clubs: the Rotary, Kiwanis, Lions, and later the Optimist clubs, hence the name Rokilio. Cabins were built and Rokilio became a winter destination as well. Sledding down the driveway from the cabins to the dining hall became classic. Camp Rokilio is 213 acres (0.86 km^{2}) of hilly terrain with tall timber located in the Kettle Moraine 7 mi (11 km) east of Kiel, Wisconsin. The camp is on Cedar Lake and has a waterfront. In the late 1990s, Cub Scout day camp moved from Twin Lakes, and Cub Scout World at Rokilio was created. The camp features five program theme buildings: Fort J.J. Keller, Gunderson Viking Bäten, Knauf Space Station, Kohler Castle, and Oertle Train Station.

The buildings are home to 13 sessions of four-day and three-night Cub Scout resident camp from June through August, and weekend use by all units the remainder of the year. Camp Rokilio offers waterfront activities in Cedar Lake, BB guns and archery ranges, and a natural bog conducive to nature hikes and environmental studies.

- Cub Scout World Camp Rokilio, a Cub Scout resident camp

=== JAX Camp ===
JAX Camp is a rustic weekend camp that offers basic amenities, and is located in Door County near Sturgeon Bay, in the town of Sevastopol.

=== Camp Brown ===
Camp Brown is a rustic weekend camp that offers basic amenities, and is located in Porterfield, Wisconsin. This camp is mainly used by the Northern Lights District, but is a Bay-Lakes Council property. Similar to JAX Camp, Camp Brown has only latrines, hand pump wells, and no electricity. The camp has a Facebook Page.

== Former camps ==
Former Bay-Lakes Council camps (click on markers for Geohack maps)

The following properties were originally owned by the council (or one of its predecessor councils) or operated by the council as a camp:

=== Camp Hiawatha ===
Founded in 1967, the camp consists of 800 acres around Bunting Lake in the Hiawatha National Forest south of Munising, Michigan. The camp provides eight developed campsites for Scouts BSA and Cub Scout resident camps, a number of buildings to serve the programs and activities, and a few cabins that can be rented by families. Camp Hiawatha was transferred to the Michigan Crossroads Council along with the Hiawathaland District on January 1, 2025.

=== Camp Twin Lakes ===
Camp Twin Lakes was located on County Road K, 11 miles (18 km) south of Waupaca, WI, on 425 acres (1.72 km2) of woods and meadowland, with three lakes that were used for swimming, boating, canoeing, and fishing. It was developed into sixteen campsites ranging from improved sites for group camping to leave-no-trace sites for backpacking to family campsites for registered Scouters and family. It also had several hiking trails and three winter buildings, two housing twenty-four people and one for eighteen. Originally designed for Cub Scout Day Camp, Camp Twin Lakes was later used as the home of Twin Lakes Webelos Resident Camp. Camp Twin Lakes was sold to private buyers in 2016 and was leased by Bay-Lakes until the Webelos Summer Camp program was moved to Gardner Dam Scout Camp in 2018 as part of the Imagine 2024 (later Growing Future Leaders) initiative.

=== Camp Maywood-Wilderness ===
Camp Maywood-Wilderness, founded 1970, (over 200 acres near Wautoma) was primarily used for Wood Badge and JLT courses. In addition to some rustic campsites, it had a heated barn with kitchen and bunkhouse, a pavilion, a private lake, hiking trails, and geocaching. The camp was sold to private buyers in 2014 as a part of the Imagine 2024 initiative, and some of its assets given to the other Bay-Lakes camps.

=== Camp Sinawa ===
Camp Sinawa is now a privately run camp in Valders, WI. Sites are rented out by the public and various youth groups.

=== Camp Shaginappi ===
Camp Shaginappi, used by the former Badger Council, was on Pipe Creek and is now a county park.

=== Camp Red Buck ===
Camp Red Buck was an early Boy Scout summer camp located on Scout, Council, and Red Jacket Lakes in Michigan's Upper Peninsula near Munising. The camp was closed with the opening of Camp Hiawatha. The site is currently occupied by the Council Lake Dispersed Campsite in the Hiawatha National Forest.

== Order of the Arrow ==
Bay-Lakes Council is served by the Kon Wapos Lodge of the Order of the Arrow. The Kon Wapos totem is the snow shoe hare, and the lodge does not use a lodge number (if required for administrative purpose, the council number of 635 is used, but it is not the lodge number). This lodge was formed as the 2013 merger of Ag-Im and Awase lodges.

Awase Lodge #61 was chartered on January 1, 1974. The name Awase, originally derived from the word owasse, which means "bear" in the Menominee Indian language, was adopted as the name for this lodge, which was created as new lodge, due to the merger of the six Northeast Wisconsin Councils. The original lodges, Shaginappi, Sinawa, Chequah, Wa Zi Ya Ta, Day Noomp, and Wolverine chose lodge #61 for the new Awase Lodge. Some arrowmen have chosen to correlate the lodge number "61" to signify "six lodges to one" (circa 2010).

Ag-Im Lodge #156 was formed in 1945 from Northwoods Circle Lodge #156 (originally part of Copper Country Council), Ottawa Lodge #198 (originally part of Iron Range Council), and Minnewasco Lodge #250 (originally part of Red Buck Council).

The ancestry of each of these lodges is depicted below.

Shaginappi #61 founded 1932	Ay-Ashe #73 founded 1934	Northwoods Circle #156 founded 1939	Ba-Ta-Wa-Ga-Ma #198 founded 1941
Sinawa #73 name changed 1937	Chequah #194 founded 1941	Wa Zi Ya Ta #233 founded 1943	Day Noomp #244 founded 1943	Ottawa #198 name changed 1943	Minnewasco #250 founded 1943
Wolverine #501 founded 1953	Ag-Im #156 merged 1945
Awase #61 merged 1974
Kon Wapos #635 merged 2013

== See also ==
- Scouting in Wisconsin
- Local council camps of Scouting America - Wisconsin
