= Water and Woods Field Service Council =

Field service council in Michigan

- Owner: Boy Scouts of America
- Headquarters: Flint, Michigan
- Country: United States
- Founded: August 14, 2012
- President: Rich Wells
- Council Commissioner: Michael Weber
- Scout Executive: Paul Schwartz
- Website www.michiganscouting.org/WaterAndWoods

Water and Woods Field Service Council was a field service council of the Michigan Crossroads Council that served youth in the central and northeastern Lower Peninsula of Michigan. The Council was headquartered in Flint, Michigan, with service centers located in Auburn, Lansing, and Port Huron. The Water and Woods Field Service Council was the result of a merger in 2012 of Lake Huron Area Council, Blue Water Council, Tall Pine Council and Chief Okemos Council.

== Organization ==
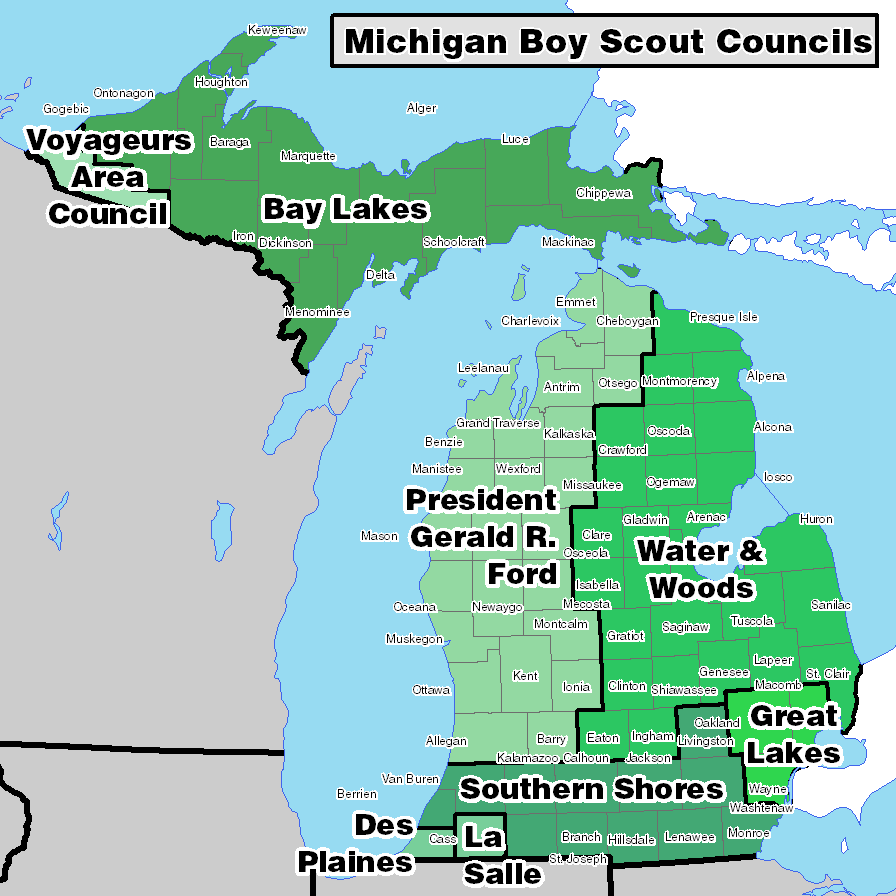
BSA Councils in Michigan. The Water and Woods FSC serves scouts in eastern and central Michigan.

The Organization of the Boy Scouts of America councils in Area 2 of the Central Region is unique to Michigan. The Michigan Crossroads Council (MCC) was created by the merger of nine councils in the lower peninsula of Michigan. It is a coordinating council that oversees properties, personnel, and program. MCC is then split into four field service councils which handle the day-to-day aspects of Scouting and have their own professional staff serving local units.

The Water and Woods Field Service Council is composed of the former Blue Water, Lake Huron Area, Tall Pine, and Chief Okemos Councils.

Water and Woods is further divided into eight districts to better serve the Scouting units in the local community.

- Blue Star District serving youth in Lapeer County, and serving youth in Davison, Lakeville, Beecher, Bentley, Clio, Flint, Flushing, Genesee, Kearsley, Mount Morris, and Westwood Heights School Districts.
- Blue Water District serving youth in St. Clair and Sanilac County, Michigan
- Chief Okemos District serving youth in Clinton, Eaton and Ingham County, Michigan, and the Portland School District in Ionia county.
- Heartland District serving youth in Midland, Gladwin, Clare, Isabella and Gratiot Counties.
- Ojibway District serving youth in Saginaw County, Michigan, as well as the communities of Reese and Vassar in Tuscola county.
- Rivers North District serving youth in the Atherton, Bendle, Carman-Ainsworth, Fenton, Goodrich, Grand Blanc, Lake Fenton, Linden, Montrose & Swartz Creek School Districts and Shiawassee County, Michigan
- Shoreline District serving youth in Bay, Arenac, Ogemaw, Oscoda, Iosco, and Alcona counties.
- Thumb District serving youth in Huron and most of Tuscola County.

In 2020, Michigan Crossroads Council made a decision to merge their Field Service Councils to create one central Council.

== Properties ==
All properties in the Michigan Crossroads Council are operated by the council-wide Outdoor Adventures Committee, not by the local Field Service Council. However, each of the four Field Service Councils continue to hold events at their traditional camps from their legacy councils. Each year, the Outdoor Adventures Committee assesses the council property and determines which camps will be open for resident summer camps, weekend camping, or closed for the season. Transition Properties Committee Report

=== Silver Trails Scout Reservation ===
Silver Trails Scout Reservation Silver Trails was a 300-acre camp near Jeddo, Michigan, on the St. Clair-Sanilac County line. It is 28 miles North West of Port Huron, 78 miles North East of Detroit, 68 miles East of Flint and 88 Miles South East of the Tri-Cities; just a short 20 minute drive from a major shopping area. Silver Creek winds through the Scout camp, emptying into the Black River on the east end of camp. There are five cabins, three Adirondacks (3-sided shelters), and fourteen campsites. The camp’s Dining and Meeting Hall, known as the Rotary Lodge, was a gift from area Rotary Clubs and was completed in 1948. The camp was dedicated on November 1, 1945. Over the years, numerous other buildings and facilities were added to the camp. These include a chapel, health lodge, Order of the Arrow Trading Post, Nature Center, and most recently, a new Training and Activities Building.

The camp is situated in the Black River basin, carved out by the Black River, Silver Creek, Fuseline Creek, and Wilson Creek. Silver Trails might be best known for its steep cliffs, scenic bluffs, and rolling landscape. Hemlock and Birch trees cover the camp, as well a Trilliums, endangered flowers that flourish in the woodlands. The camp’s trademark is the “Number Nine Tree”, a large Sugar Maple that once grew along Silver Creek. Its trunk was twisted in the form of a number nine. The tree has since been cut down, but remains on display at camp as a testament to Silver Trail’s rich history.

Annual events held at Silver Trails included Fall and Spring Camporees for Boy Scouts; "Mom-and-Me" and "Dad-and-Lad" for Cub Scouts, and Fall and Spring Conclaves for the Order of the Arrow. Silver Trails has been host to both the 2005 and 2011 Section C-2A Conclaves of the Order of the Arrow.

Michigan Crossroads Council closed and sold Silver Trails in the fall of 2019 to gravel mine company, Mid Michigan Materials.

=== Paul Bunyan Scout Reservation ===
The Paul Bunyan Scout Reservation was a wilderness camp near Rose City, Michigan. It was originally purchased by the Boy Scouts in 1959, and was closed in 2013. The Michigan Crossroads Council listed the camp for sale in 2019 and eventually sold the property in September 2021.

=== Camp Rotary ===
Owned by the Saginaw Rotary Foundation, and leased by the Boy Scouts, Camp Rotary offers 1,180 acres (5 km^{2}) of year around camping just north of Clare, MI, on Old US-27. Camp Rotary has heated cabins, a full service dining hall and an outdoor education center that can be used as a classroom for Schools, Civic Groups, or Business. Camp Rotary was purchased in 1924 and has served as a summer camp since 1926. It was alternately known as Camp Ke-pay-sho-wink (Anishinabe for "a good place to camp")in its early days. It has been a primary scout camp for the Saginaw Council (1926-1929) the Saginaw Valley Council (1929-1934) the Valley Trails Council (1934-1961) the Saginaw Bay Area Council (1961-1971) the Lake Huron Area Council (1971-2012) and continues as a primary Boy Scout Camp for the Michigan Crossroads Council (2012–present).

=== Camp Holaka ===
Camp Holaka offers many camping choices among its 340 acres (1.4 km^{2}) of rolling woodlands and trails in Lapeer County. It also has many cabins and a couple lodges for indoor camping and many campsites for tent camping. During the summer, Camp Holaka is used primarily for Cub Scout camping with different day camps and weekend events.

Camp Holaka is closed as of 2014. It was sold to a developer in 2018 or 2019. The developers plan was to create a camp for disabled children.

=== Camp Tapico ===
Camp Tapico is located in the eastern region of Kalkaska County just north of M-72 between Grayling and Traverse City; the camp's closest town is of the same name, Kalkaska. Directly to the north of the camp is the larger sporting lake of Manistee and to the east is Bear Lake. Camp Grayling, a United States National Guard installation, is also located 20 miles (32 km) to the south east.

The camp covers 1200 acres of mixed deciduous and coniferous forests. Camp Tapico has three bodies of water with the primary being the 120-acre (0.49 km^{2}) Grass Lake. The other two are smaller, developing ponds set away from the general campers. Grass Lake however, features a robust ecosystem and is one of the main attractions to the property. The lake's deepest spot of 75 feet (23 m) allows for large walleye and bass while shallow sandbars, make for great fishing. Camp Tapico has 17 wilderness campsites, which Scout troops, Venturing crews and other groups can rent. During the winter, Camp Tapico hosts activities such as snowshoeing and winter camping in quinzhees.

The camp was established in 1946 and developed a thriving summer camp operation. Camp Tapico ran a traditional week-long summer camp program. It served Scout troops from Flint, MI and the surrounding suburbs, as well as out-of-council troops from Illinois and Missouri. Troops camped out and participated in staff-led activities such as the Water Carnival and flag ceremonies. Scouts also earned merit badges like Archery, Rifle Shooting, Canoeing, Climbing, and Wilderness Survival.

This camp has been permanently closed and sold by the Council. It is now a nature preserve under the name: Upper Manistee Headwaters: The Milock Family Preserve.

=== Camp Kiwanis ===
Camp Kiwanis located 3.5 miles (5.6 km) east of Mason, Michigan, on M-36 at Diamond Road. The camp contains 85 acres (340,000 m^{2}), 55 acres (220,000 m^{2}) of which are wooded. Camp Kiwanis is open year-round for camping, hiking, sledding and outdoor fun. Camp facilities can sleep 107 people indoors, or 300 outdoors. Camp Kiwanis was previously owned by the Lansing Kiwanis Club and used as a fresh air camp for tubercular children. It was donated June 8, 1939, to the Chief Okemos Council of the Boy Scouts of America. The camp was also used for several years by the Volunteers of America and the Salvation Army for children and their mothers.

=== Northwoods Scout Reservation ===
Northwoods Scout Reservation is located near West Branch in Ogemaw County, Michigan. The camp consists of 840 acres (3.4 km^{2}) of northern hardwood forest, wetlands and Lake Arrowhead, a 90-acre (360,000 m^{2}) private lake. 618 of the 840 is used as the main scout camp, the remaining 24 acres (0.1 km^{2}) is a family camp; where families can stay when their kids are at camp. Part of Big Williams Lake is also on camp property. Facilities range from rustic campsites on the south side of the lake to the heated log cabin overlooking Lake Arrowhead. Chief Okemos Council purchased Northwoods Scout Reservation in 1962. It was formerly the Kenyon Ranch, with the only structure on the property a horse barn, which is now a garage at the ranger’s house. The roads, campsites, cabins for staff and family camp, Log Cabin, Meijer Lodge, Administration Building, Memorial Building and program structures were added over the years. The camp has two unofficial Mascots; one is a loon, the other is a very large snapping turtle nicknamed Bowser. Once every four years, contingents of Scouts, both all-boys and mixed boys and girls, from over 20 countries all around the world, gather at Northwoods for 8 days of international friendship and fellowship at the Chief Okemos Council’s Michigan International Camporee, the largest council-run multinational Scouting event in North America.

The Northwoods Scout Reservation closed in 2016 following the 2012 merger of nine scout councils into the Michigan Crossroads Council, and was sold in 2018 to Detroit real estate developer Dennis Kefallinos.

=== Camp Weidman ===
Camp Weidman was owned by Lake Huron Area Council of the Boy Scouts of America and is intended for District or Council events and Unit (Pack, Troop or Crew) activities of the Boy Scouts of America. Unit activities must be approved by the Unit Committee and meet the requirements of Lake Huron Area Council and Boy Scouts of America.

Camp Weidman is located four miles (6 km) west of Mt. Pleasant just off M-20. From M-20, turn south on Vandecar Road. Go approximately ½ mile to the Chippewa River. The entrance to Camp Weidman is about 80 yards (73 m) south of the bridge on the west (right hand) side hand of the road and is marked by a sign. Camp Weidman is a square 40-acre (160,000 m^{2}) parcel with the Chippewa River winding through it. Deerfield County Park adjoins Camp Weidman on the north and west borders.

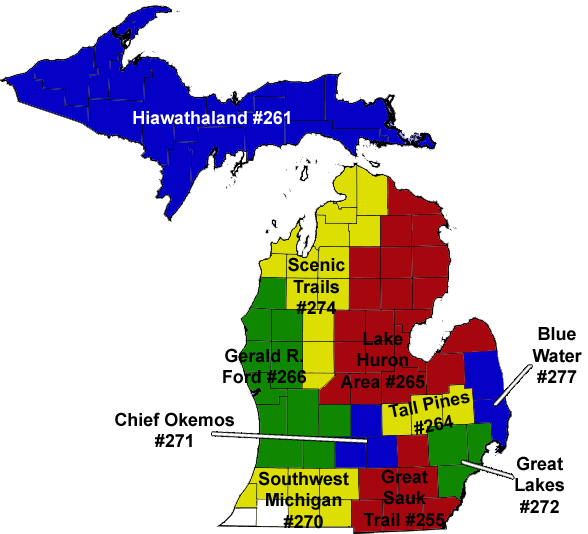
BSA Councils in Michigan prior to the Area 2 project and the Michigan Crossroads Council.

== Legacy Councils ==
=== Blue Water Council ===
The former Blue Water Council No. 277 was based out of Port Huron, Michigan. The Council was Established in 1919 to serve scouts in the Port Huron Area, and was officially granted permission in 1928 to serve scouts in the St. Clair and Sanilac County area. Blue Water Council was the smallest council in the State of Michigan, and was one of, if not the smallest in the nation. Yet, the small council was stable both in membership and fiscally. The original council camp was located along North River Road in Clyde Township, Michigan. The Council also operated Camp Loyalty for a short time in the 1930s, which was located south of Port Sanilac, Michigan. In 1942, the family of Crowswell Businessman Philip Graham donated property along the Black River in Sanilac County to Blue Water Council. The property was known as "Camp Chickagami", named after the Council's Order of the Arrow lodge that was established just one year earlier. Camp Chickagami was located 2 miles north of Croswell, Michigan, and is now a county park by the name of "P.L. Graham Memorial Park". In 1948, the council's camp moved downriver to the current Silver Trails Scout Reservation in Jeddo, Michigan.

The Blue Water Council was divided into two districts at the time of its merger. The Black River Basin District served units numbered in the 100s and 300s in the City of Port Huron, Northern St. Clair, and all of Sanilac County. The Three Rivers District served units numbered in the 200s which included downriver communities in Southern St. Clair County.

=== Lake Huron Area Council ===
The former Lake Huron Area Council No. 265 was created in 1971 with the merger of Saginaw Bay Area Council (headquartered in Saginaw, Michigan) and Paul Bunyan Council (headquartered in Midland, Michigan) and parts of Scenic Trails Council (headquartered in Traverse City, Michigan). Its headquarters city was Auburn, Michigan, and comprised 19 counties located in Northeastern Michigan. Major cities include: Bay City, Saginaw, Midland, Mt. Pleasant, Clare, Harrison, Gladwin, Standish, Caro, Alpena, Oscoda, Grayling, Houghton Lake, Alma, Ithaca, West Branch and Rose City, as well as many other smaller towns.

Historically the first Scout council serving this area was formed in 1917 in Bay City. Soon after other councils were formed in Saginaw (1919) and Midland (1920). In 1927 Bay City and Midland merged into an "area" council named Summer Trails Council. The following year Saginaw formed the Valley Trails Council. Summer Trails initially served communities from Bay City into the Thumb and northward on the east and central parts of the state up to the Straits of Mackinaw. Valley Trails included Saginaw, Gratiot, Isabella, Clare and part of Tuscola counties. In 1951 Midland, Arenac, Roscommon and Gladwin Counties divided off to form Paul Bunyan Council, while the counties north of that joined the Scenic Trails Council out of Traverse City. In 1961 Summer Trails and Valley Trails merged to form Saginaw Bay Area Council.

The council was initially organized into nine districts: Shoreline, Arrowhead, White Pine, Pioneer Trails, Thumb, Tomahawk, Chippewa, Au Sable, and Thunderhead. At the time of the merger it had downsized to six districts, including: Tall Pine, Chippewa, Ojibway, Shoreline, Thumb, and Thunderhead Districts.

=== Tall Pine Council ===
The former Tall Pine Council No. 264 was a local council of the Boy Scouts of America which served counties of Lapeer, Genesee, and Shiawassee in the Flint, Michigan, area.

There were four districts in the council, including: North Star District, Blue Heron District, New Horizons District, and Shiawassee District.

=== Chief Okemos Council ===
The former Chief Okemos Council No. 271 served scouts in the Mid-Michigan area, and was based out of Lansing, Michigan. The council was divided into three districts. The Mawanjidiwin District served the greater Eaton County area. The Migisins District served the northern portion of the Lansing Public School District and much of Clinton County. The Ojibwas District served the southern portion of the Lansing Public School District and the greater Ingham County area.

== Agaming Maangogwan Lodge ==
The Order of the Arrow is a youth-lead honor society of Scouts who provide service to their local camps and communities. In the Water and Woods Field Service Council, Agaming Maangogwan Lodge 804 has been chartered to serve the needs of the new field service council. Agaming Maangogwan translates in Ojibwe to "Loon Feather on the Shore". The lodge is split into nine chapters, one per district.

Agaming Maangogwan Lodge will be the host for the 2015 National Order of the Arrow Conference (NOAC) at Michigan State University. NOAC is the second largest gathering of scouts in the nation, and will be celebrating the 100th anniversary of the order in 2015.

The current lodge 804 covers the same geography as the former lodges of Chickagami 180, Mischigonong 89, Cuwe 218, and Gabe-Shi-Win-Gi-Ji-Kens 374. Agaming Maangogwan Lodge is a member of Central Region Section 2 of the Order of the Arrow.

=== Legacy lodges ===
==== Chickagami Lodge ====
Chickagami Lodge No. 180 of the Order of the Arrow served the Blue Water Council since 1941. The Lodge had no chapters and hosted bi-annual conclaves at Silver Trails Scout Reservation. The lodge's totem was the Standing Brave, and a Chicken was the "unofficial mascot" of Chickagami Lodge. Total membership was 168 members. Chickagami Lodge was the second smallest lodge in the nation, and operated a trading post located at Silver Trails Scout Reservation. Chickagami Lodge earned Quality Lodge in 2007, 2008, and 2010.

During the 1960s and 1970s, the Chickagami ceremonial dance team competed across the nation for Order of the Arrow competitions.

Chickagami was a member of Central Region Section 2A of the Order of the Arrow.

==== Mischigonong Lodge ====
Mischigonong Lodge No. 89 was the local Order of the Arrow Lodge serving the former Lake Huron Area Council. It was formed in 1971 as a result of a merger of 89-Kepayshowink (1936-1971), 469-Tittabawasink (1951-1971), 214-Gimogash (aka Tom Tom) 1942-1961 and parts of 152-Indian Drum Lodges. The totem was the canoe. The lodge hosted the 1986 National Order of the Arrow Conference in Mount Pleasant, Michigan, at Central Michigan University. It was a member of Central Region Section 2B of the Order of the Arrow.

==== Cuwe Lodge ====
Cuwe Lodge No. 218 was the local Order of the Arrow Lodge serving the former Tall Pine Council. Cuwe is the Lenape word for "pine tree." This Order of the Arrow lodge was divided into four chapters, each correlating to their respective districts in Tall Pine Council. These chapters include Chippewa (North Star), Bidaban (New Horizons), Muscadawin (Blue Heron), and Wassa (Shiawassee). The lodge was a member of Central Region Section 2A. It held a spring and fall conclave each year to induct new members.

==== Gabe-Shi-Win-Gi-Ji-Kens Lodge ====
Gabe-Shi-Win-Gi-Ji-Kens Lodge No. 374 served the former Chief Okemos Council of central Michigan. The lodge was chartered in 1948, and had 301 members in 2004. Gabe-Shi-Win-Gi-Ji-Kens means "Camp on the Little Cedar", and the lodge totem is the cedar tree.

In 2003 Gabe-Shi-Win-Gi-Ji-Kens won its first National Service Award for the OA Chapel project, in 2005 Gabe-Shi-Win-Gi-Ji-Kens won its second National Service Award for the OA Adirondack Village project, and again in 2008 Gabe-Shi-Win-Gi-Ji-Kens won its third National Service Award for its Campfire Bowl Bowl project.

Gabe-Shi-Win-Gi-Ji-Kens was the host lodge of the 2006 and 2012 National Order of the Arrow Conference (NOAC) held at Michigan State University and has won the NOAC Spirit Award 3 times, and the National Service award twice. It was also the home lodge of the 2008 National Vice Chief Ben Stilwill. Gabe has a strong record of achieving the Quality Lodge distinction.

== See also ==
- Boy Scouts of America
- Central Region (Boy Scouts of America)
- Michigan Crossroads Council
- Order of the Arrow
- Mid-Michigan
- Northern Michigan
- Scouting in Michigan
