= Merritt Lamb =

Merritt Udell Lamb
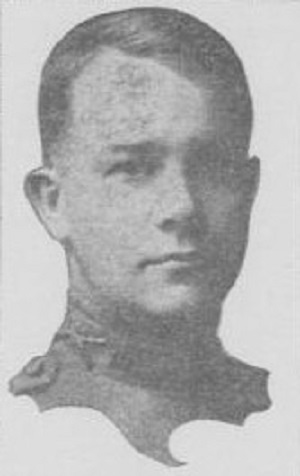
- Lamb c. 1917
- Born: April 4, 1892; Rockford, Michigan, U.S.
- Died: August 28, 1918 (aged 26); Juvigny, France

Merritt Udell Lamb (April 4, 1892 – June 28, 1918) was the founder of scouting in West Michigan and the 13th Eagle Scout in the United States. Lamb was killed in action during the battle of Juvigny, France, on August 28, 1918. Lamb is currently buried in his hometown of Rockford, Michigan.

== Scouting career ==
As a boy Merritt joined the Boy's Brigade; By age 13 Merritt became captain of the brigade, and by age 18 Merritt convinced the members of his Brigade to disband and reform as a troop in the newly created Boy Scouts of America. By November 1910 the first unit in West Michigan, "Rockford Troop 1," was formed with Merritt Lamb as the first scoutmaster. A little less than a year after forming Rockford Troop 1, Merritt Lamb moved to Muskegon, Michigan and started Muskegon Troop 1; again he was the scoutmaster. As time went on and more units formed Merritt moved up in the ranks, becoming Muskegon's first Scout Commissioner, and eventually Muskegon's First Scout executive. Merritt would also move on to be a member of Boy Scouts of America National Council.

In the Fall of 1913 Merritt Lamb achieved Scouting's highest honor and became an Eagle Scout. Merritt Lamb's attainment of the Eagle Scout rank was the 13th in the nation. On September 6, 1916, Merritt saved the life of Loyal Plough when he was caught in an undertow during a Troop 1 Scout Outing. Merritt received the Bronze cross for lifesaving from the National Boy Scouts of America for this action. Merritt Lamb was the first person from Michigan to receive the Bronze Cross for Lifesaving.

In 1914, Lamb is credited with establish the first Scouting units in El Paso, Texas, while he served in the U.S. Army near there.

== Military career ==
Merritt was scoutmaster when he joined the Michigan National Guard in 1910. In 1913 Merritt was promoted to corporal. Merritt was commissioned as a second lieutenant in May 1914. Merritt served on the Texas-Mexican Border during Pershing's punitive expedition against Pancho Villa, and helped establish the first motorized machine gun battalion. While in Texas he formed the first Scout troop.

When the US entered World War I, Merritt used his scouting skills to help train enlistees first aid and woodcraft skills. For his efforts he received a commendation. In July 1918 Merritt was promoted to captain and made an intelligence officer of the 125th infantry regiment. During the Battle of Juvigny, France, on August 28, 1918, Captain Lamb was on a scouting trip to locate the headquarters for his regiment. Captain Lamb was given information that the Germans had left town in retreat, but upon arrival had discovered that the enemy was still present. While returning with this new information Captain Lamb was killed by a bursting shell.

== Legacy ==
Although Captain Lamb only lived to be 26, his actions left a lasting legacy that would go on to impact scouting for many years to come. Following his death, Muskegon troop 1 re-chartered with the National Boy Scouts of America as, "Merritt Lamb Troop 1." Merritt Lamb Troop 1 went on to serve Muskegon area Scouts for many decades.

In addition to scout units, there are also a West Michigan American Legion post named after Captain Lamb.

=== Hackley Park Memorial ===
In 1939, over 20 years after his death, the Muskegon Boy Scouts planted an Elm Tree in Captain Lambs honor. In addition to a tree, a plaque attached to a rock from the lamb family farm was also placed in Hackley Park.

=== Camp Merritt ===
In the summer of 1919, the Muskegon Boy Scouts held a summer outing on Lake Michigan in honor of Captain Merritt. In 1921 the Muskegon Area Council bought property on the north shore of Big Blue Lake from the Muskegon Children's home. This property which would go on to serve Muskegon Scouts for the next 29 years was named, "Camp Merritt," in honor of Captain Lamb. Camp Merritt which consisted of 94 acres had a dining hall donated by the local Kiwanis club in 1923, a cook shack built in 1925, and a handicraft lodge built in 1928. The last structure built on the property was the Order of the Arrow Chapel in 1948. This chapel which is shaped like an arrowhead was built by Scottish Rite Masons for the Nakida Naou lodge 401; Nakida Naou lodge 401 was organized and inducted its first members during the summer of 1947 and received their first charter in fall of 1948. Nakida Naou was the Muskegon Area Scouts first Order of the Arrow lodge.

Due to the size constraints of the 94 acre Camp Merritt; the Muskegon Boy Scouts purchased property including Britton lake from the Chicago Council's Camp Owasippe in 1950. In 1950 the new Britton Lake camp Worked alongside Camp Merritt; in 1951 Camp Merritt was closed permanently and Britton Lake Camp was renamed Gerber Scout Reservation.

The property that once contained Camp Merritt is now owned by Pioneer Resources and serves special needs youth.

=== Camp Merritt Lamb ===
Lamb was also instrumental in the founding of Scouting in El Paso, Texas. As a recognition, in 1922 the El Paso Council named Camp Merritt Lamb in his honor.

=== Gerber Scout Reservation Program areas ===
Sometime in the 1970s the Muskegon Exchange Club provided funding for the local scouts to build a flag field at Gerber Scout Reservation in honor of Captain Lamb. This flag field was eventually retired.

In 2004 Gerber Scout Reservation built a new program area called the Honor Ground. The Honor Ground program area offers Eagle Scout required merit badges during the summer. Shortly after the program area was established it was dedicated in honor of Captain Merritt Lamb

== Published works ==
- Lamb, Merritt Udell (2016). My Scout, and Other Poems. Wentworth Press. ISBN 9781372973710.

== Bibliography ==
- Todish, Tim (2009). A Legacy for the Future. pp. 129–131. ISBN 978-09843104-0-1..
