= Gerber Scout Reservation =

Resident camp in Michigan, US

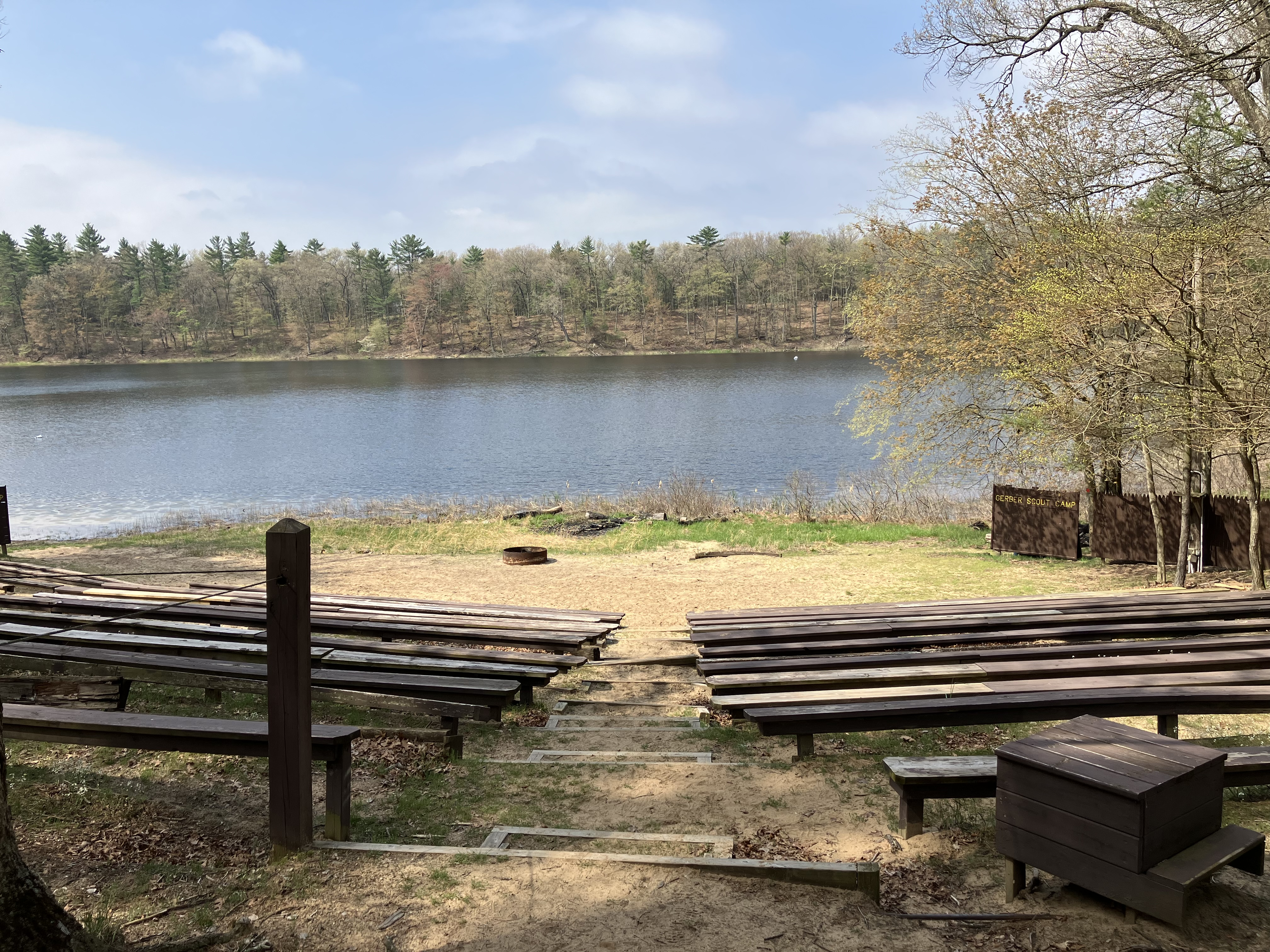
- Location: Twin Lake, Michigan
- Coordinates: 43.447031°N 86.196091°W
- Founded: October 7, 1951
- Camp Director: Marie Becvar
- Reservation Ranger: Vacant

Gerber Scout Reservation (GSR), located in Twin Lake, Michigan is a resident camp owned and operated by the Michigan Crossroads Council of the Boy Scouts of America. It began operation in 1950 and had its first official summer camp program in 1951. The Original property was purchased through a gift of 275 shares from Dan Gerber, founder of the Gerber Products Company. The reservation operates two camps; Gerber Scout Camp and the Betty Ford Cub Scout and Webelos Adventureland, as well as numerous year round weekend programming outside of the summer months.

== Geography ==
Gerber Scout Reservation lies within the boundaries of the Manistee National Forest in Blue Lake Township, Muskegon County, Michigan and is approximately 800 acres in area. The property is bordered on the north by Owasippe Road. The Blue Lake Township Hall and Fire Department lie within a quarter mile from the camp's main entrance. On the south and east borders of the property, Camp Gerber borders Owasippe Scout Reservation. The property contains four lakes; Big Britton, Little Britton, Mayo, and Grub. It shares Mud Lake with Owasippe. Gerber contains wetlands, oak and pine forests, and several areas of Michigan prairie. Some hills are very sandy in some places.

== History ==
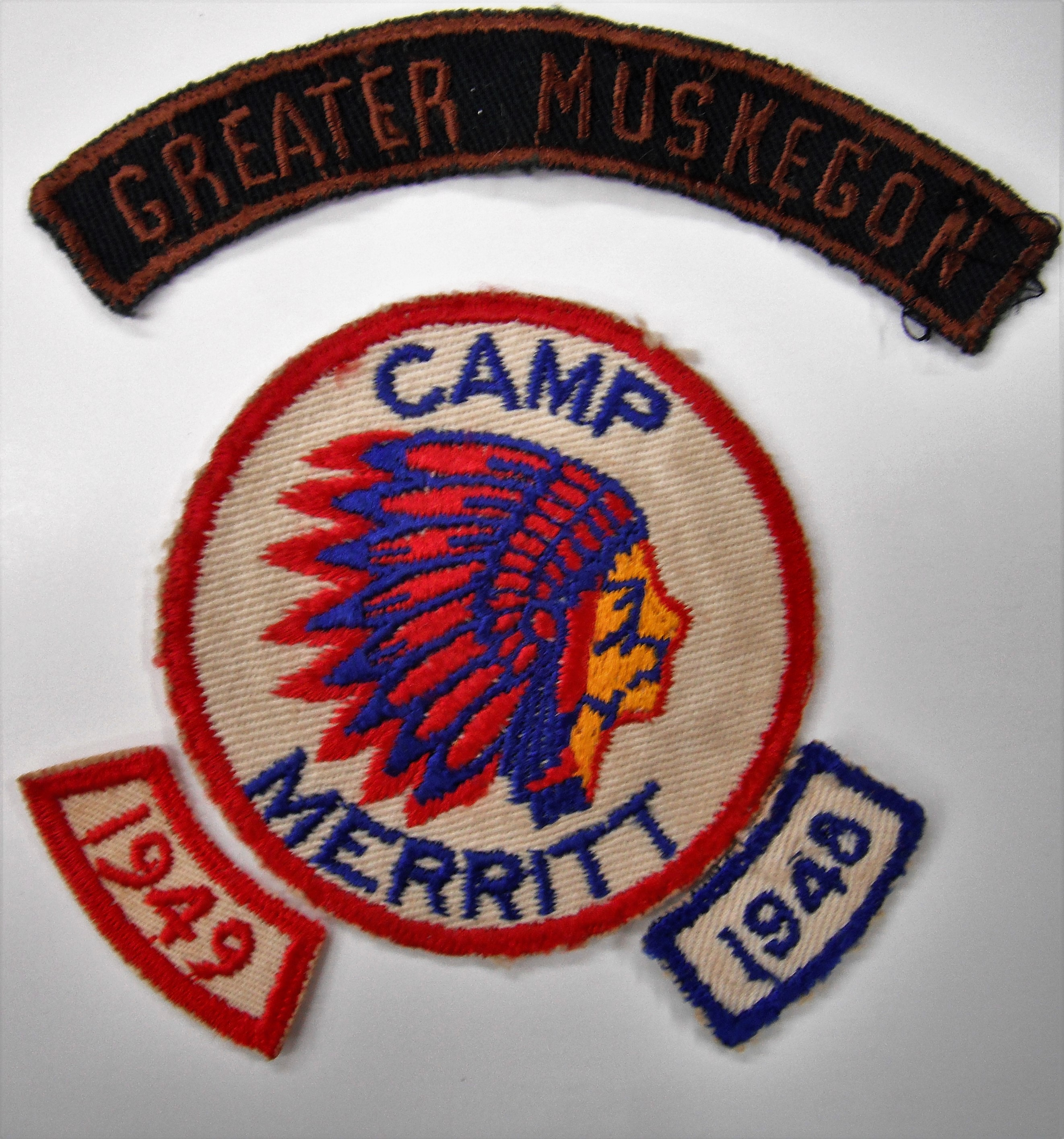
Camp Merritt year patch; Circa 1940s

In 1949, the Timber Trails Council Board decided to find a larger site for local scouts to camp. Their current site Camp Merritt was only 17 acres and bordered on all sides by other area summer camps, with no room to expand. In 1950 the board purchased the original 80 acres of Gerber Scout Reservation that included most of Britton Lake. This purchase was made on credit, but later paid off by the donation of stocks from Dan Gerber. The site was originally called "Camp Britton" or "Britton Lake Camp", but was renamed in honor of Dan Gerber and named Gerber Scout Reservation in 1951. Between 1950 and 1952, the first buildings were completed on the property. Bruce Cleveland Lodge, the original Rangers House, now used as the Reservation Director's house, was completed early in 1951. Evans Lodge, the original Boy Scout Camp Dining Hall, was completed in 1951 with a generous donation from the Elks Lodge. The Ranger Station, a large maintenance building used to service the camps many maintenance and building projects, is believed to be completed in the first few years of the camp's opening. Tryon Lodge, a log cabin used for staff housing in the summer and troop rentals and events during the year, was finished in 1952.

Chaffee Bunkhouse was officially dedicated Roger B. Chaffee and expanded to memorialize the sacrifice he gave to science and the space program. The Lodge features a photo of Mr. Chaffee as well as news articles about him framed in the common area.

In 2008 the Reservation built a replica of Fort Clatsop, the fort that Lewis and Clark built when they reached the Pacific Ocean. In 2012 they were recognized by the Lewis and Clark Trail Heritage Foundation with the Meritorious Achievement Award for its construction and use in youth programming.

== Logo ==
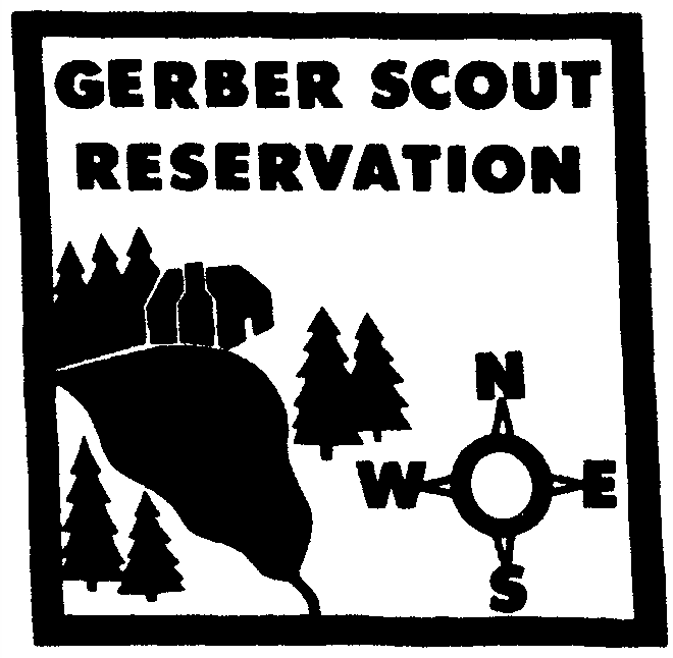
Gerber logo used in the 1950s-1960s

Used on the camp patches, neckerchiefs and insignia from 1951-1963, this logo depicted Big Britton lake and Evans Dining Hall.

In the 1960s Native American themed logos and insignia were very popular among Scout camps. A Native American themed logo was used on the 1964 and 1965 camp patch and mug; this logo was also used on the camp neckerchiefs from 1964-1969 and on the “Gerber Trails Award,” from 1964 through the early 1970s.

Starting in the late 1960s and continuing on through the mid 1970s with the implementation of the, “Early Bird Camper," program, woodpeckers became a common symbol used on the camp insignia, in 1970 a cardinal was used in place of the woodpecker, and in 1974 a blue jay was used.

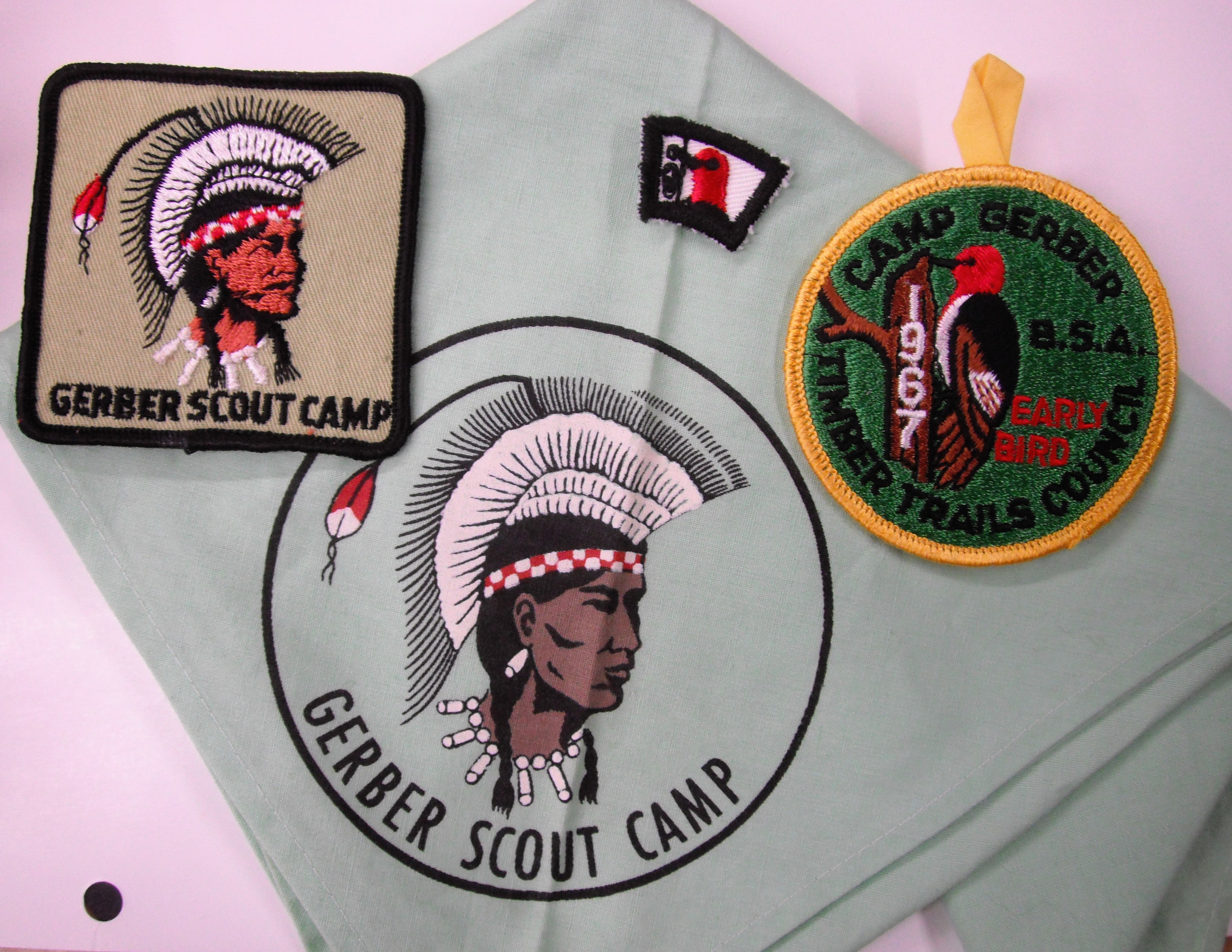
Indian and woodpecker logo on 1960s era insignia

After the merger of the Timber Trails Council and Grand Valley Council, a knot was primarily used as the camp symbol; this was in recognition of the two council camps (Camp Gerber and Camp Roger B. Chaffee) coming together. In addition to a new shared logo, the camps also shared a program and staff. The first half of the summer camping season would take place at Camp Chaffee and the second half of the summer camping season would take place at Gerber Scout Reservation. The transition period between the camping seasons was appropriately nicknamed,"The Great Move," as the staff would tear down one camp and set up the other in the same weekend. In 1981 this transition was ended and Camp Chaffee was sold. All of the campsites on Gerber's "Constellation Trail" are named after former Camp Chaffee campsites.

After the selling of Camp Chaffee, various outdoor themes were used on the camp insignia. In 1990, Gerber Scout Reservation adopted the moose as its new logo. Since the moose was adopted, it has been used on countless shirts, patches, and other items. The most recent update to the moose logo occurred in 2013, following the merger of the Gerald R. Ford Council.

== Resident camping ==
Gerber Scout Reservation has two resident camps; Gerber Scout Camp, that serves Scouts, and Betty Ford Adventureland, that serves Cub Scouts. In 2010 and 2011, Camp Gerber also operated the DeVos Family Venture Base, however in 2011 when the Gerber Scout Reservation became a part of the Michigan Crossroads Council, it was not selected to continue running its Venturing Program. The buildings from the Venture base have since been used as staff housing for the Scout and Cub Scout Resident Camps.

=== Gerber Scout Camp (GSC) - Scout Resident Camp ===
Gerber Scout Camp serves Scouts BSA Troops and is currently accredited through the National Camp Accreditation Process.

Gerber Scout camp has gone through major facilities improvements starting in 2002 and continuing through today. Some of these were the addition of a climbing tower and a high and low ropes course. In the middle of these improvements, the dining hall collapsed on December 24, 2008. In 2009, the camp used a 500-person tent as its dining hall. The Centennial Dining Hall was then built and opened in 2010, and seats 720 people.
