= Michigan Crossroads Council =

Local council of the Boy Scouts of America

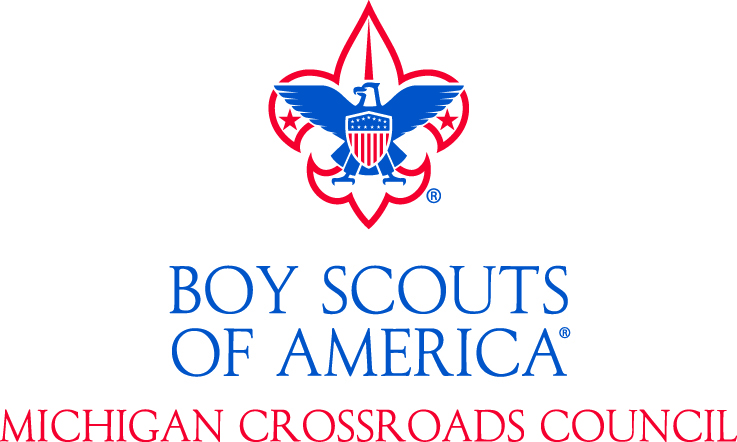
- Owner: Boy Scouts of America
- Headquarters: Eagle, Michigan
- Country: United States
- Founded: August 14, 2012
- President: Tim Ekola
- Council Commissioner: Stephen Foster
- Scout Executive: Don Shepherd
- Lodge Chief: Connor Todd
- Website http://www.michiganscouting.org/

The Michigan Crossroads Council (MCC) is a local council of the Boy Scouts of America that encompasses most of the State of Michigan. The council was formed in 2012 by the merger of nine councils.

== History ==
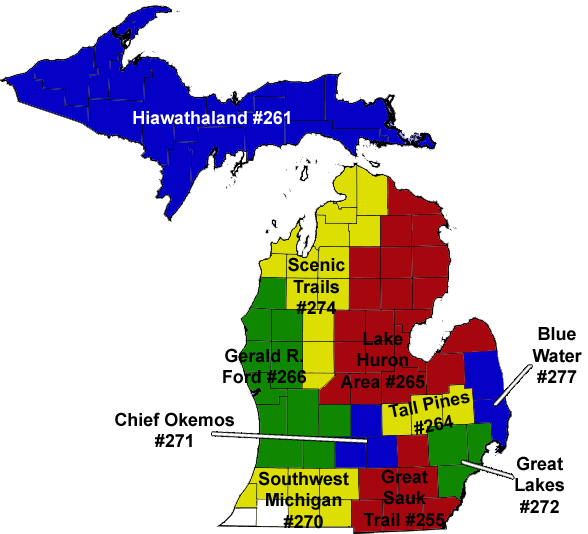
BSA Councils in Michigan prior to the Area 2 project and the Michigan Crossroads Council

=== 2012 Merger ===
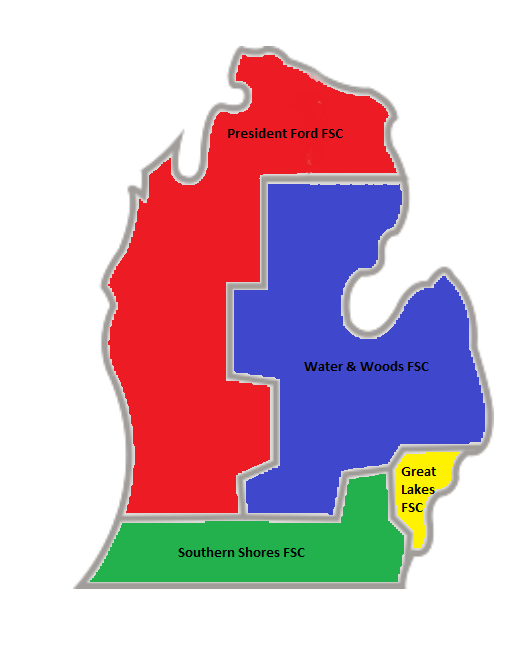
Michigan Crossroads Council's early map of their 4 Field Service Councils

The Scouting program in Michigan's Lower Peninsula saw a drastic drop in membership beginning in the early 2000s. The decrease in population was due to the economy in Michigan and the resulting out-migration of population, jobs and industry. The Area 2 Project was created in 2010 and studied the impact on Scouting and presented the Crossroads Recommendation, which proposed that the ten councils in Michigan merge into one large council.

Erie Shores Council in northwest Ohio voted not to join the Area 2 project. Hiawathaland Council in the Upper Peninsula of Michigan, voted against merging into MCC and later merged with the Bay-Lakes Council in Wisconsin.

As a result, in 2012, the remaining Lower Peninsula councils were merged into the Michigan Crossroads Council (MCC). The MCC is then split into four sub-councils or "Field Service Councils" which are then divided into districts.

==== Field Service Councils ====
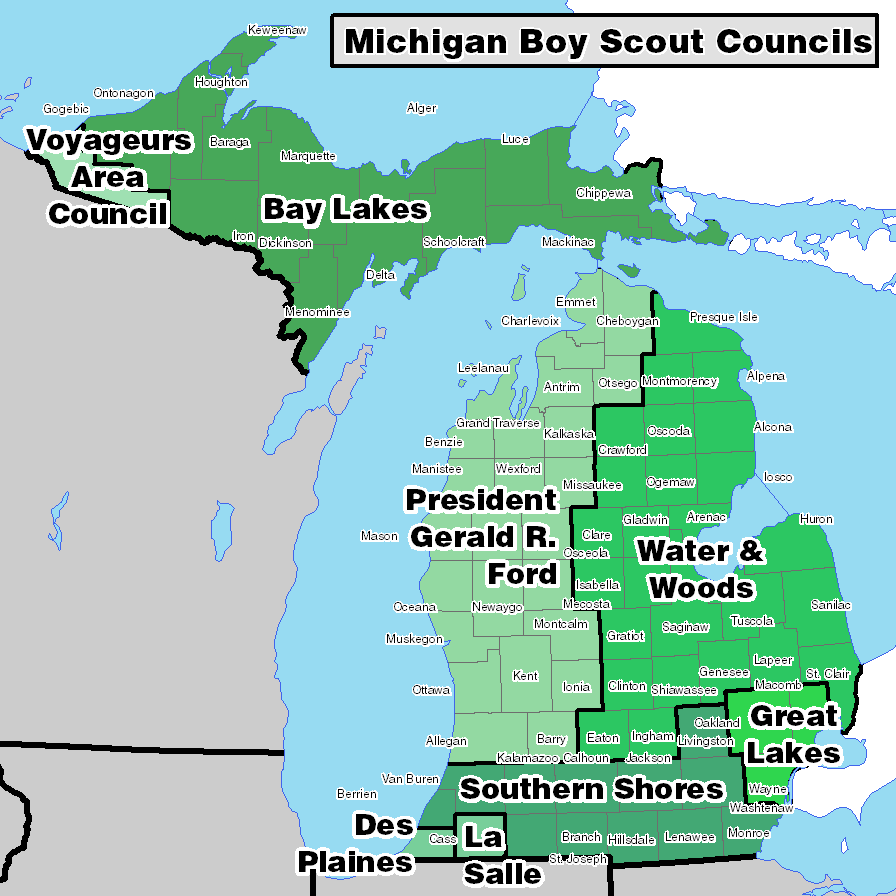
Pre-2025 map of BSA Councils in Michigan, including the four Field Service Councils of the Michigan Crossroads Council

- Great Lakes Field Service Council
- President Gerald R. Ford Field Service Council
- Southern Shores Field Service Council
- Water & Woods Field Service Council

=== 2020 Merger ===
In 2020, Michigan Crossroads Council made a decision to merge their Field Service Councils to create one central Council.

=== 2025 Hiawathaland District Transfer ===
On December 2, 2024, Michigan Crossroads Council and Bay-Lakes Council announced that the Hiawathaland District and Camp Hiawatha would be transferred to the Michigan Crossroads Council on January 1, 2025. The new district was added to Zone 1 of the President Ford Division.

== Organization ==
The Organization of the Michigan Crossroads Council Boy Scouts of America councils in Area 2 of the Central Region is unique to Michigan. The Michigan Crossroads Council (MCC) was created by the merger of nine councils in the lower peninsula of Michigan. It is a coordinating council that oversees properties, personnel, and program.

=== Divisions ===
As of 2021, Michigan Crossroads council has absorbed its Field Service Councils and is now divided into two administrative divisions. These divisions are formally called the President Ford Division, encompassing most of the western counties of Michigan's lower peninsula; and the Great Lakes Division encompassing the lower peninsula's eastern counties.

==== Districts ====
President Ford Division

- Northern Lights
- Scenic Trails
- Shoreline
- Timber Trails
- Heartland
- Ojibway
- Lakeshore
- Eagle Spirit
- Chief Okemos
- Wabano
- Pathfinder
- Nottawa Trails
- Hiawathaland

Great Lakes Division

- Blue Water
- Rivers North
- Blue Star
- Three Fires
- Pontiac-Manito
- Chippewa
- Ottawa
- North Star
- Sunrise
- Irish Hills
- Huron Trails
- Sunset
- Renaissance
- Mahican
- Running Waters

== Order of the Arrow - Mishigami Lodge 29 ==
The council is served by the Mishigami Lodge 29. The word Mishigami means "Land of Great Waters" in the Ojibwa language. The lodge uses the Mastodon as its totem. Mishigami Lodge performs service to all Michigan Crossroads Council Camps, hosts fellowship activities, promotes camping among council Scout Troops, Venturing Crews, and Cub Scout Packs, and attends regional and national Order of the Arrow events.

Like all Order of the Arrow programs, the Mishigami Lodge has youth leaders who are advised by appointed adults. The six lodge officers (Chief, Vice Chief of Program, Vice Chief of Area Relations, Vice Chief of Administration, Vice Chief of Finance, and Vice Chief of Communications) are elected annually. The lodge's work is performed by committees which have youth chairmen and adult advisers.

A volunteer Lodge Adviser is appointed by the Scout Executive. The lodge adviser appoints other adults to serve as advisers to specific lodge officers and committees. The Scout Executive also appoints a member of the professional staff to serve a Staff Adviser to the lodge.

Mishigami Lodge Chiefs:

2021: Zach Zlomek

2022: Tim Pfeiffer

2023: Michael Ferdig

2024-2025: Jason Babb

2026: Connor Todd

Mishigami is one of the six lodges that make up Section E2. Section E2 serves to support six lodges all across Michigan, Western Ohio, and Northern Kentucky. The section works closely with the lodge Key 3(Lodge Adviser, Lodge Chief, and Lodge Staff Adviser) to encourage growth and activation by offering the Section Leadership Seminar(SLS) and Section Conclave. SLS is an annual training tailored to each lodge and current challenges they are facing in order to give their arrowmen the tools they need to overcome those challenges. Later in the year, the Section holds Section Conclave which is a weekend full of trainings, fellowship, amazing shows, and more, all with the main purpose of activating and inspiring arrowmen.

The Order of the Arrow consists of four main levels: National, Regional, Sectional, and Council. Mishigami lodge sits at the council level. Beyond the council level arrowmen have a variety of opportunities to serve larger parts of the organization as a whole. Adults also have opportunities to serve at these levels as well. Individuals from Mishigami that have provided such service may be found below.

Service Beyond The Lodge:

Daniel Miller: 2021-2022 Section C2 Chief

Zachary Dotson: 2021-2022 Section C2 Vice Chief

Michael Ferdig: 2021-2022 Section C2 Secretary; 2022-2024 Section E2 Vice Chief

Brian Chrzanowski: 2022-2025 Section E2 Adviser

Timothy Pfeiffer: 2022-2023 Section E2 Secretary; 2023-2024 Section E2 Chief

Madison Wagner: 2024-2026 Section E2 Chief

Jack Lehmann: 2024 Section E2 Vice Chief

Ryan Shork: 2024-2025 Section E2 Secretary

Richard Mercado: 2025-2026 Section E2 Secretary

Elliott Patton: 2025-Present Section E2 Associate Adviser

== Camps ==
All properties in the Michigan Crossroads Council are operated by the council-wide Outdoor Adventures Division. Each year, the Outdoor Adventures Committee assesses the council property and determines which programs each camp will be operating such as resident summer camps, weekend camping, or shooting sports activities. The following is a list of camps that MCC operates:

=== Resident camps ===
The following are open in the summer for Cub Scout, Boy Scout, and Venturing resident camps. They are also open for weekend reservations year-round.

- Great Lakes Sailing Adventure, Mackinaw City, Michigan
- Cole Canoe Base, Alger, Michigan
- Camp Rotary, Clare, Michigan
- Gerber Scout Reservation, Twin Lake, Michigan
- D-Bar-A Scout Ranch, Metamora, Michigan
- Camp Teetonkah, Jackson, MI
- Camp Hiawatha, Munising, Michigan

=== Closed camps ===
Since its inception, the Michigan Crossroads Council has closed and sold several camps owned by predecessor councils to balance its finances. The following camp properties are no longer operated for an indefinite amount of time and are not available for reservations:

- Camp Agawam, Lake Orion, Michigan – returned to Orion Township and now open as park, still used by Scouts
- Camp Holaka, Lapeer, Michigan – sold to developer
- Camp Munhacke, Gregory, Michigan – closed 12/31/19
- Camp Tapico, Kalkaska, Michigan – sold and now is a nature preserve
- Northwoods Scout Reservation, Lupton, Michigan – sold
- Camp Kiwanis, Mason, Michigan – owned by Saginaw Kiwanis club still run as a camp and available for Scout use
- Lost Lake Scout Reservation, Lake, Michigan – listed for sale
- Paul Bunyan Scout Reservation, Rose City, Michigan – listed for sale
- Rota-Kiwan Scout Reservation, Kalamazoo, Michigan – sold to Kalamazoo County to be used as a park
- Silver Trails Scout Reservation, Jeddo, Michigan – sold to gravel company
- Camp Greilick, Traverse City, Michigan - used as GO•REC facility until purchased by Grand Traverse County Commission, converted into park space
- Camp Red Buck Munising, Michigan - Formerly operated by Hiawathaland Council, Closed circa 1966, site now occupied by Hiawatha National Forest, Council Lake camp sites.
- Camp Minneyata Ishpeming, Michigan - Formerly operated by Hiawathaland Council, Closed 1960s, now operated by AMVETS as Unky Lake camping area.
- Camp Harlow Lake Marquette, Michigan - Operated circa 1920's by Pere-Marquette Council. Site now occupied by Michigan DNR Harlow Lake rustic cabins.
