= Fotoautomat =

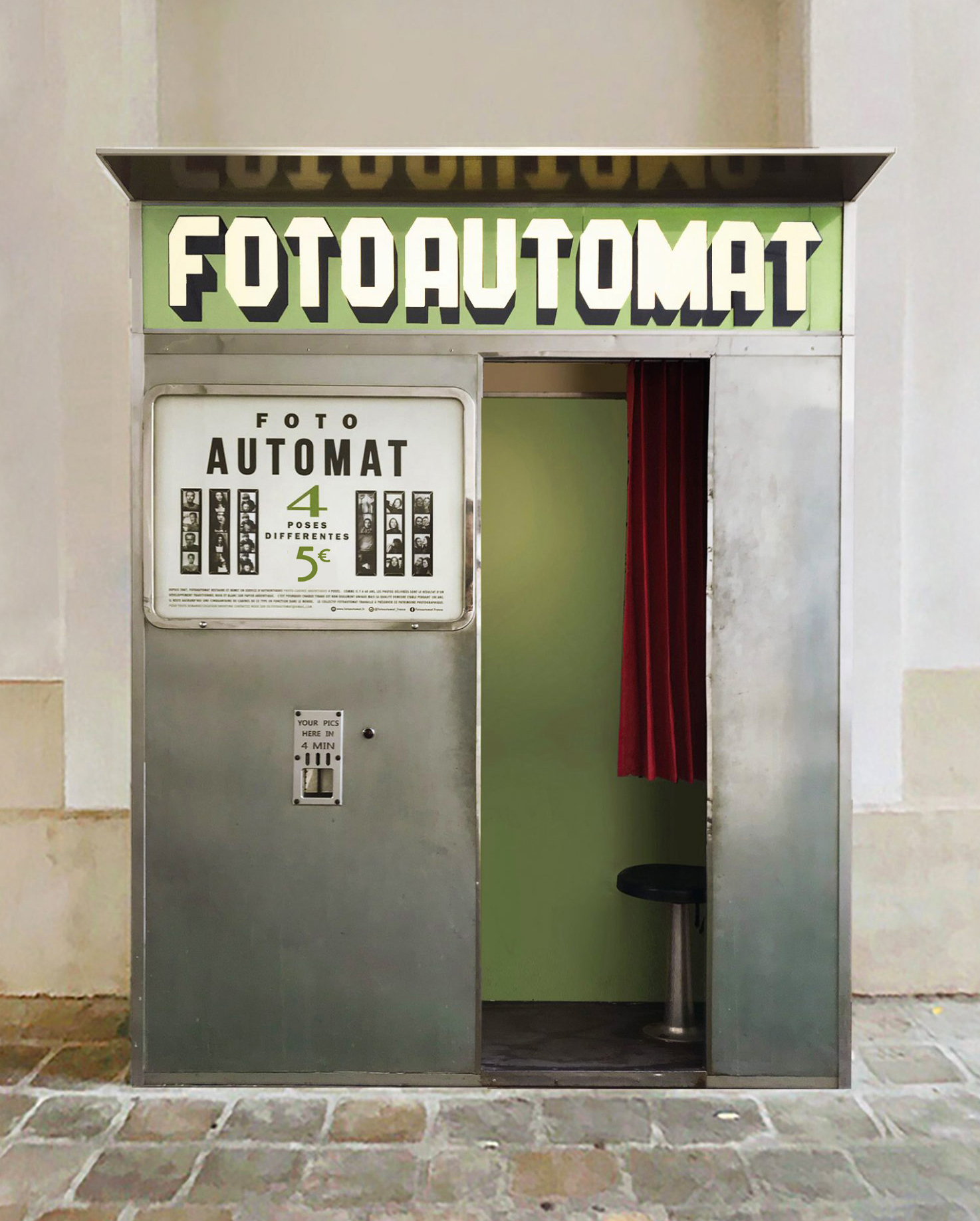
- Type: Société par actions simplifiée
- Industry: Photography
- Founded: 2007
- Founder: Eddy Bourgeois
- Headquarters: Paris, France
- Products: Analog photo booths
- Owner: Eddy Bourgeois; Virginie Voisneau
- Website: fotoautomat.fr

Fotoautomat is a company specialized in the restoration, preservation, and operation of analog photo booths. Founded by Eddy Bourgeois in 2007 in France, it contributes to the preservation of photographic heritage at a time when fewer than 200 booths are believed to still be operating worldwide.

== History ==
The activity of Fotoautomat France originates in Berlin, where the Photoautomat collective brought old analog photo booths back into service after their near disappearance in Europe following the spread of digital booths in the early 2000s.

In September 2007, the project expanded to France: Fotoautomat emerged with the opening of a restoration workshop in Chartres and the installation of the first analog booth at the Palais de Tokyo in Paris, marking the return of this type of machine in France.

In 2011, the first fully redesigned and reconstructed analog photo booth left the workshop to be presented at the Rencontres de la photographie d’Arles.

Other Parisian cultural institutions then hosted their restored booths, including the Jeu de Paume, La Maison Rouge, the Grand Palais, and the Cinémathèque française. Fashion designer Karl Lagerfeld acquired one for his studio, where he photographed his guests.

In 2016, the first place with an analog booth accessible directly from the street opened in Montmartre. In 2026, Fotoautomat opens a second store in Montmartre, where the company offers high-quality color photos for the first time.

In 2020, two Fotoautomat booths were installed in Prague at the National Theatre and the National Gallery Prague.

== Activity ==
The company restores authentic analog photo booths designed in the 1960s. Fewer than ten different models were originally designed, most of which were later modified at low cost during the 1980s to modernize their appearance. Original models that remain intact, now rare, are restored to their initial configuration whenever their condition allows it.

Other booths undergo custom restorations depending on their installation site, including redesign of the booth’s appearance (forms, materials, signage, posters), conceived by Eddy Bourgeois and Virginie Voisneau, sometimes involving the complete reconstruction of the structure while preserving the original analog mechanism. The original mechanical and electrical systems are overhauled to ensure reliable image capture and development even under intensive use.

Inside the booth, an automated darkroom carries out the photographic development process. Each photograph, produced on silver-gelatin paper, is exposed in four poses and then immersed in chemical development baths for four minutes before being delivered. A contactless payment terminal is added to simplify the payment process.

== Cultural significance ==
Besides Fotoautomat, the newspaper Le Monde reports that only about a dozen other restorers still know the technology of analog photographic booths and are able to maintain them. These booths are part of the history of photography and popular culture. This view is now shared by cultural institutions hosting Fotoautomat booths, for example at the Palais de Tokyo. “The museum director had considered that an art space like this could not contain only serious things. He wanted this museum to be a living place centered around culture,” said Eddy Bourgeois, founder of Fotoautomat, in an interview with Réponses Photo magazine.

Originally designed for the rapid production of identity photographs, old analog photo booths are now being rediscovered as spaces for expression and social interaction. These booths have seen renewed interest, particularly among younger audiences, within a broader context of renewed interest in analog practices. The black-and-white aesthetic, the tangible and immediate nature of the photograph, and the collective experience within the intimate space of the booth are often cited to explain the persistence of their appeal.

Each strip is produced as a unique copy and developed directly inside the machine, with no negative preserved and no internal memory, ensuring complete freedom behind the curtain. While users may adjust their posture by looking at their reflection in the shooting window, the automatic triggering of the flashes remains partly unpredictable. The image is never entirely controlled; it retains an element of spontaneity and accident. According to The Wall Street Journal, this characteristic may correspond to a desire for authenticity among some young people “tired of hyper-retouched posts…”.

The photographic strips, which have become souvenir objects, are frequently shared on social media, contributing to making the photobooth an intergenerational social ritual.

The value attributed to Fotoautomat photo booths is not limited to their practical function but also lies in their historical character and formal design. An expert report commissioned by the National Theatre in Prague from the Czech National Heritage Institute concluded that the photo booth integrates with the brutalist architecture of the New Stage building. Furthermore, the installation of booths in cultural venues is presented by the company as contributing to the “revitalization of public space”. A photobooth was installed on the theatre’s piazzetta “so that people can admire the surroundings and talk while waiting for their photos. We try to make public spaces more lively,” said Petr Šesták, a member of Fotoautomat, to Radio Prague International.

== See also ==
- Photo booth
- Purikura
