= Western Los Angeles County Council =

Southern California council of Scouting America

Western Los Angeles County Council (#051)
- Owner: Scouting America
- Headquarters: Van Nuys, California
- Country: United States
- Founded: 1917
- Website bsa-la.org

The Western Los Angeles County Council (WLACC) (#051) is one of five Scouting America councils in Los Angeles County, California. Headquartered in Van Nuys, the council services over 30,000 youth spanning six districts including the San Fernando Valley, Santa Clarita Valley, Antelope Valley, Malibu, and much of West Los Angeles.

== History ==
The Western Los Angeles County Council was formed in 1972 with the merger of the Crescent Bay Council (#026) and the San Fernando Valley Council (#050) to form the Great Western Council. The Great Western Council was renamed Western Los Angeles County Council in 1985.

On May 7, 2013, the Western Los Angeles County Council of the Boy Scouts issued a declaration calling for a "true and authentic inclusion policy" that would allow gay adults to work as troop leaders or staff members. The Council's campaign "Inclusion Now for All Gay Boy Scouts and Leaders: Western LA County Council Sends Clear Message" in conjunction with Olmstead Williams Communications won a 2013 PRism Award from PRSA-Los Angeles.

== Organization ==
The Western Los Angeles County Council is divided into six districts.

- Antelope Valley District, Edwards Air Force Base to Santa Clarita Valley border
- Balboa Oaks District, Central area of the San Fernando Valley: west of Sepulveda Boulevard and east of Corbin Avenue
- Bill Hart District, Santa Clarita Valley
- Campo De Cahuenga District, Eastern area of the San Fernando Valley: west of the City of Burbank to Sepulveda Boulevard
- Crescent Bay District, Mulholland Drive south to Playa Del Rey and Culver City, and from Ventura County line to Beverly Hills.
- Reyes Adobe District, San Fernando Valley: west of Corbin to the Ventura County line at Westlake Village.

== Camps ==
=== Current camps ===
- Camp Emerald Bay, Santa Catalina Island has been operating since 1925, when it was first opened by the Crescent Bay Area Council. In addition to being a summer camp, it offers year-round activities and has a great waterfront.
- Camp Whitsett, Sequoia National Forest is a summer camp in the Giant Sequoia National Monument which has been operating since 1947. Its 'sister camp' is Sierra Expeditions, which offers backpacking and other high-adventure activities. In 2012 Camp Whitsett was host to the BSA's tv show Are You Tougher Than a Boy Scout? which had six episodes.

=== Past camps ===
- Pardee Scout Sea Base, Marina Del Rey
- Camp Jubilee (late 1950s – 2003)
- Camp Slauson, Topanga Canyon (1910 – late 1970s)
- Camp Temescal, Pacific Palisades (? – 1930)
- Camp Wolverton, Sequoia National Park (1939–2012). It is apocryphally said to be the only Boy Scout camp in a National Park.

=== Camp Josepho ===
Camp Josepho, Pacific Palisades (1941–2025) is a year-round camp owned and operated by the Western Los Angeles County Council of the Boy Scouts of America. The 110-acre (45 ha) camp is located in the Santa Monica Mountains in Los Angeles County and has been serving Scouting and community groups since 1941.

The land on which Camp Josepho now lies was originally donated to the Crescent Bay Council in 1941 by Anatol Josepho and his wife Ganna. The camp quickly rose to the forefront of Scouting camps, becoming known as the West Point of Scouting. The focal point of the camp is its large old western style lodge now named the Malibu Lodge after the Malibu Lodge #566 of the Order of the Arrow.

In January 2005, a flood washed out the main road into Camp Josepho. The camp remained closed for less than a month, reopening (to backpacking) in February 2005. The camp remained inaccessible to vehicular traffic while the road was studied by civil engineers. As of July 2007, the road was open once again.

On January 8, 2025, Camp Josepho was declared "closed indefinitely" by the Western Los Angeles County Council as a result of the 2025 Southern California Wildfires. The Palisades Fire specifically resulted in the camp burning down in a complete loss.

== Order of the Arrow ==
The Malibu Lodge #566, chartered in 1972, serves 755 Arrowmen as of 2004. The lodge totem is a Pacific blue shark, and the name translates to "From the Mountains to the Sea" in the Chumash language. Malibu Lodge was created in 1972 from the merger of Tamet Lodge 225 and Walika Lodge 228.

== See also ==
- Scouting in California
