= Anatol Josepho =

Automated photo booth inventor (1894–1980)

Anatol Marco Josepho
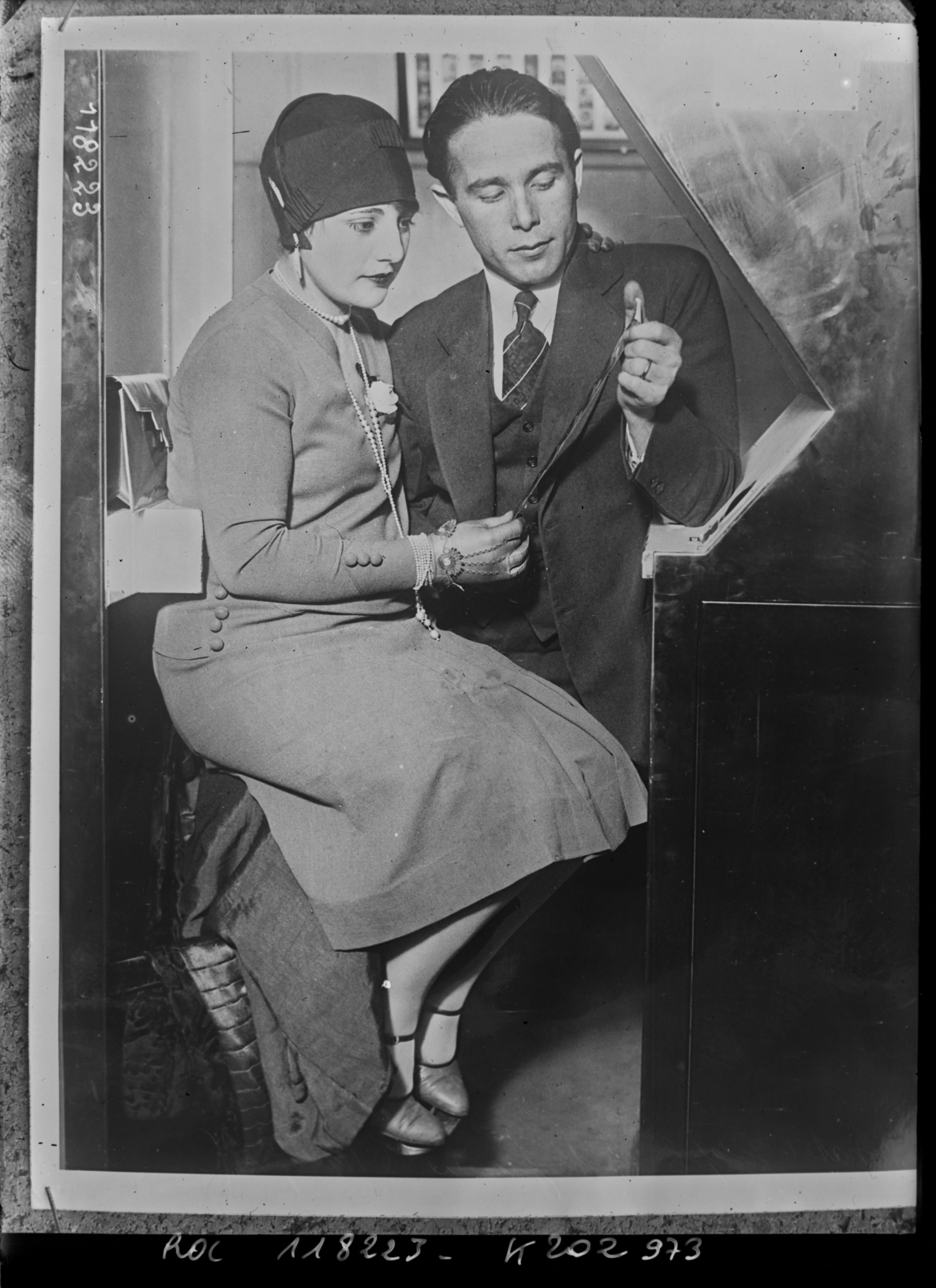
- Josepho and his wife in a Photomaton (1927)
- Born: Anatolу Markovich Yozefovich; March 31, 1894; Tomsk, Russia
- Died: December 16, 1980 (aged 86); San Diego, CA
- Occupation: Inventor
- Known for: Inventor of the photobooth
- Notable work: Photomaton
- Spouse: Hannah-Belle "Ganna" Kelhmann

Anatol Marco Josepho (born Anatolу Markovich Yozefovich, Russian: Анатолий Маркович Йозефович, later germanized as Anatol Josephewitz; March 31, 1894 – December 16, 1980) was a Jewish immigrant to the United States from Tomsk, Russia, who invented and patented the first automated photo booth in 1925, which was named the "Photomaton". In 1927, he was paid one million dollars for the invention.

== Biography ==
Josepho's father was a wealthy jeweler and his mother died when he was three years old. He developed a close bond with his father and became interested in the Wild West cultural phenomenon of expansion in the United States in the late 1800s. He began taking photographs with a Brownie camera produced by the Eastman Kodak Company during his childhood and he attended a local technical institute to pursue his growing interest in photography in 1909 at the age of 15.

On the eve of World War I, his father sent him to study in Germany. There, he studied the photo art to perfection. It was there that he conceived the idea of creating a photo machine that would work without an operator inside and would be able to produce photos automatically, but from the moment of conception to implementation it took more than 12 years. At 19, he opened his own studio in Budapest, Hungary. With the beginning of the First world war, he then moved to Shanghai. There he survived the revolution of 1917 and for a time worked as a photographer in his own photo studio. In the early 1920s, he briefly returned to Tomsk, where he soon left to the United States. In the early 1920s, he worked in New York to develop the Photomaton.

On July 22, 1926, he married Hannah-Belle "Ganna" Kehlmann (January 10, 1904 – October 19, 1978), the daughter of a New York printer and a silent film actress. The two were friends with their neighbor, performer Will Rogers and his wife Betty Blake. They had two children, both boys. He died on December 16, 1980, at the age of 86 in a rest home in La Jolla from a series of strokes.

Upon selling his invention in 1927 for one million dollars, Anatol made the announcement that he would split the money in two: $500,000 would be put in a trust for charity "along economically sound lines" and he other half would be for him to administer to help struggling inventors.

== The Photomaton ==
The US Patent was filed by Photomaton Inc March 27, 1925, and was granted on June 7 1927.

Josepho's invention of the photo booth, known as the "Photomaton", debuted in September 1926 at 1659 Broadway Street in Manhattan, located in the heart of New York City. The Photomaton charged twenty-five cents for a strip of eight photos that were developed in eight minutes. The automation was achieved in a room that synchronized a coin controlled camera that featured a single source of diffuse light. White-gloved attendants stayed by the machine during hours of operation to control the crowds as well as to provide maintenance for the machine. Around 280,000 customers, for instance, waited the eight-minute process as reported by Time magazine in April 1927. The Photomaton Company was created to place Photomaton machines all over the country. Future President Franklin D. Roosevelt was a member of the board of directors.

In 1928, Josepho sold the rights to the machine to Henry Morgenthau Sr. for $1,000,000, equivalent to $18,750,000 in 2025. In an interview with The New York Times, Morgenthau said that the machine will allow them "to do in the photographic field what Woolworths has done in novelties and merchandise, Ford in automobiles". The following year, the machine was introduced to the European market, where notable figures such as André Breton and Salvador Dalí had their portraits taken.

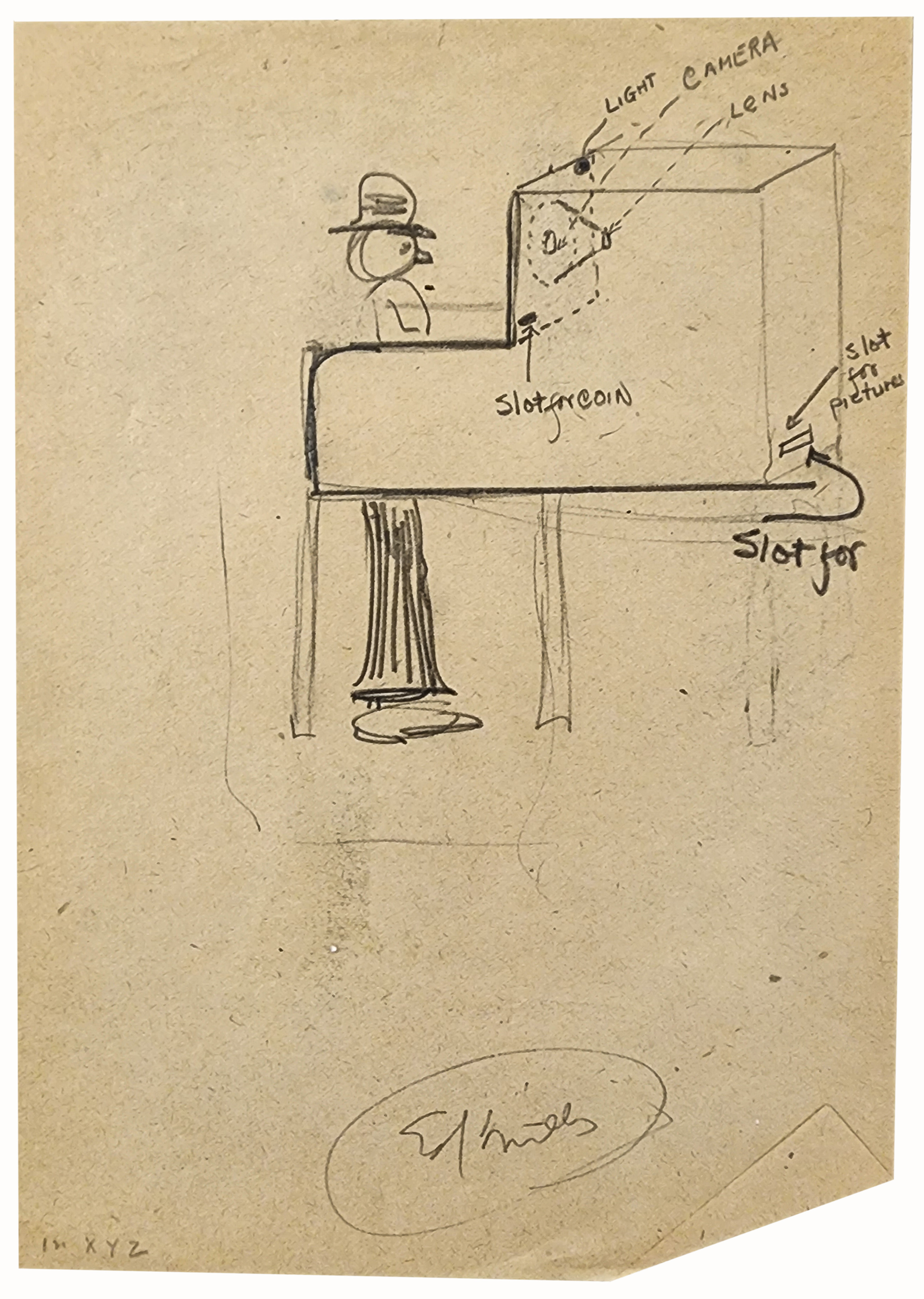
Anatol Josepho drawing for Manuel Rosenberg

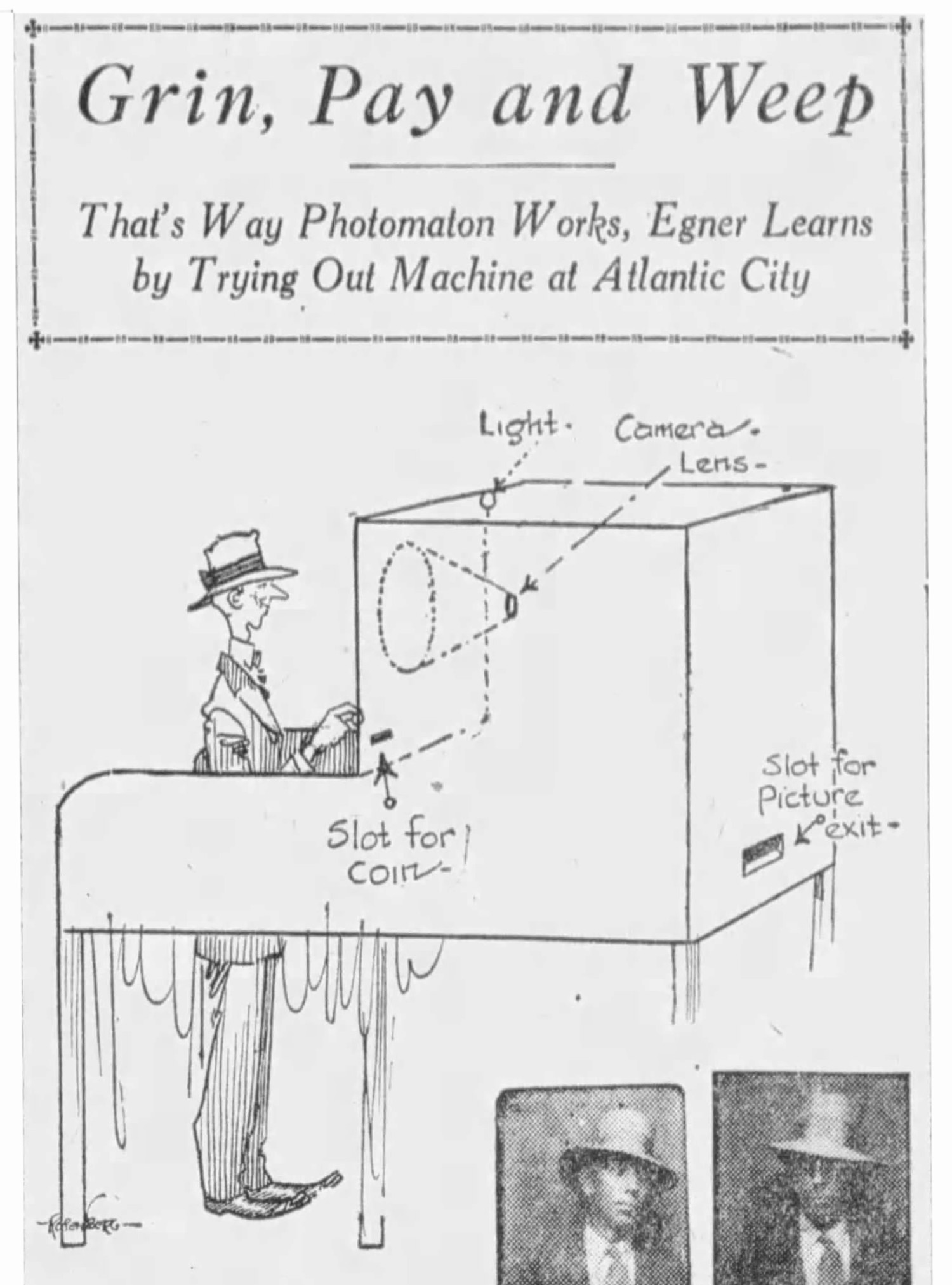
Illustration drawn by Manuel Rosenberg based on the previous drawing

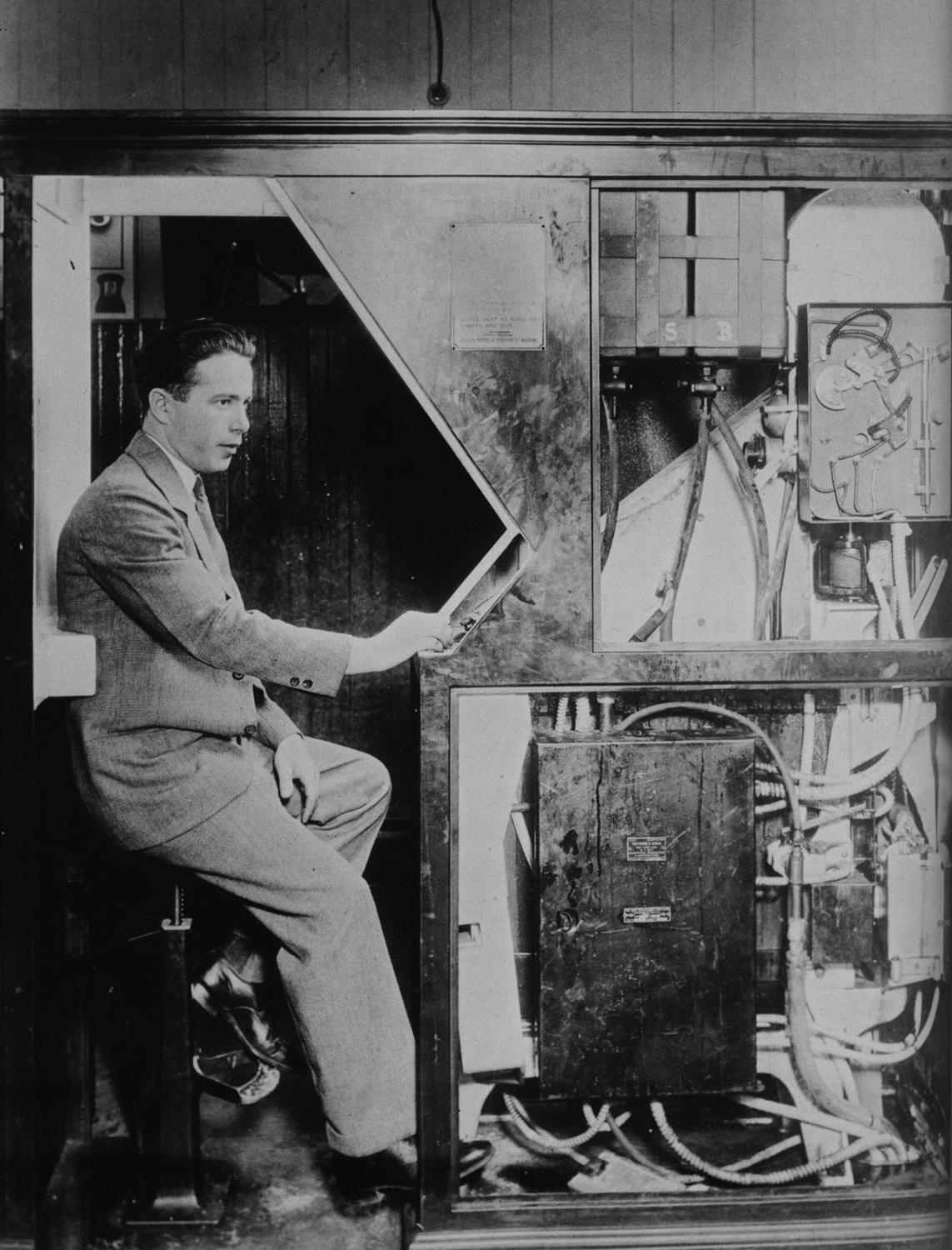
Anatol Josepho inside his photo booth in 1927

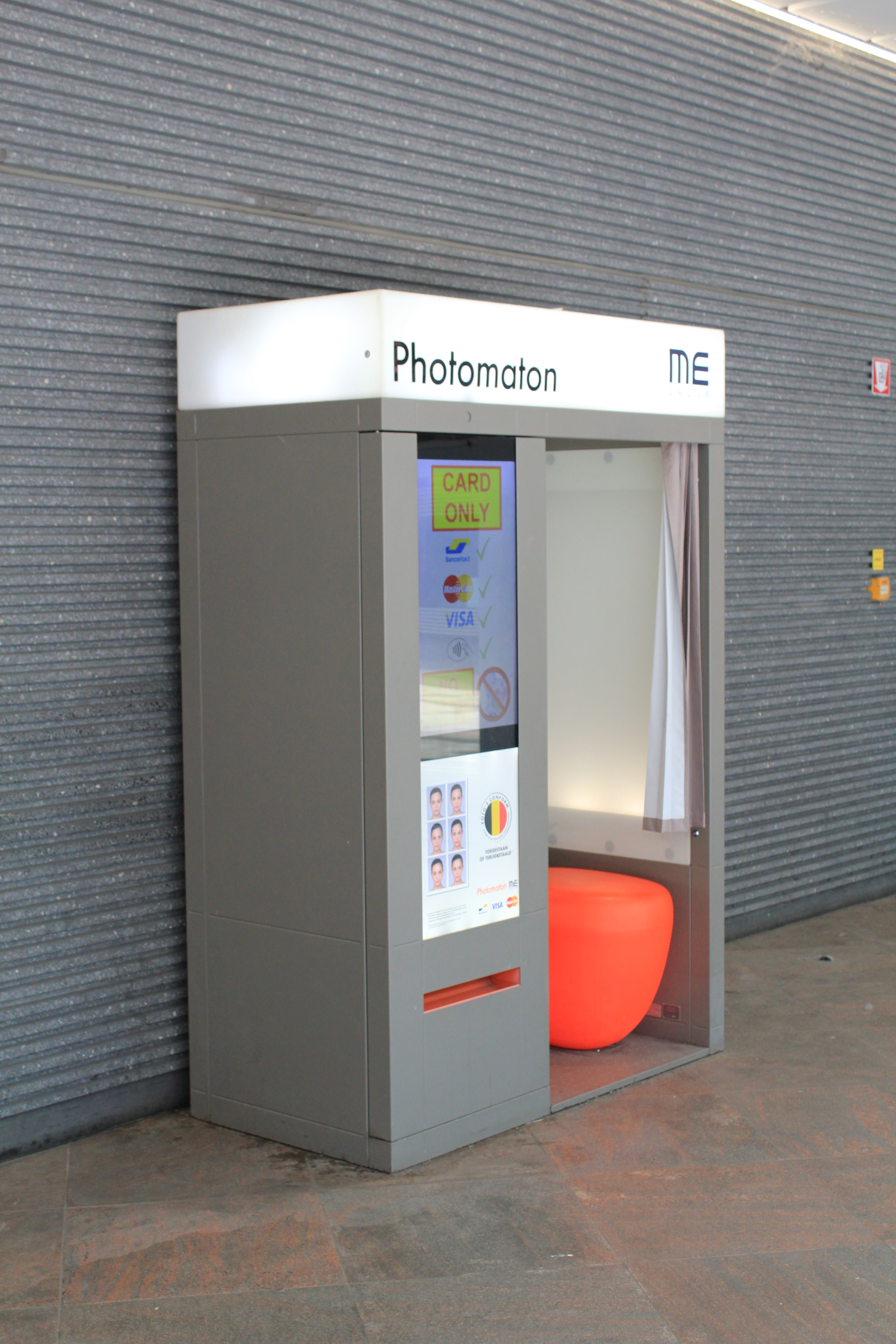
A modern Photomaton in Antwerpen Centraal Station in Belgium

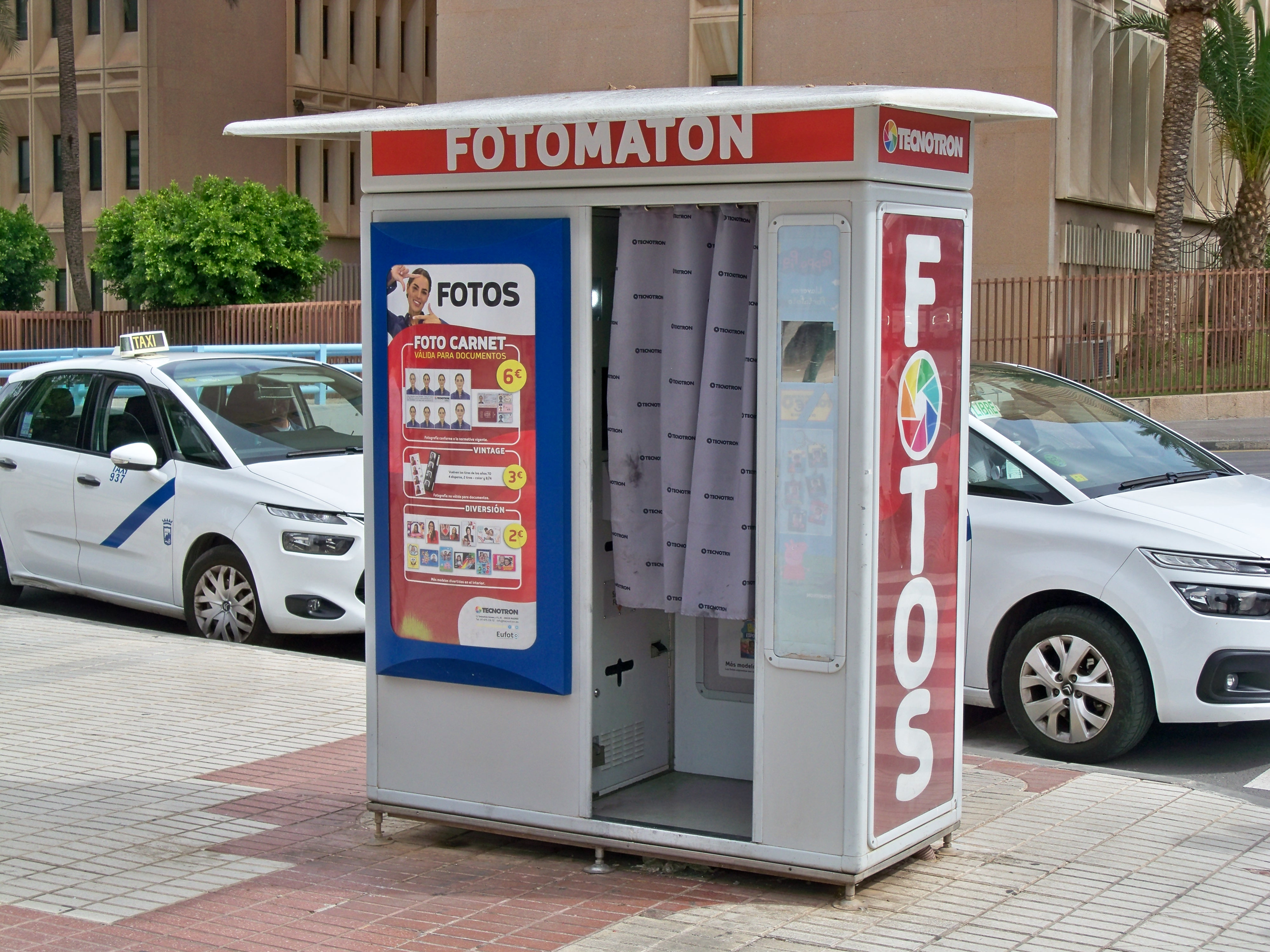
Fotomaton in Malaga, Spain

== Legacy ==
Camp Josepho, a 110-acre property, which stretches from Mandeville Canyon to Will Rogers State Historic Park, was given to the Crescent Bay Council of the Boy Scouts of America on July 7, 1941, by Anatol Josepho. The inventor wanted to thank his adopted country and support his favorite charity, the Boy Scouts of America. Actor Leo Carrillo officiated the dedication ceremonies. The camp accommodated 400 campers.

Camp Josepho under the Western Los Angeles County Council (WLACC) continued to fulfill its mission of serving youth throughout Los Angeles, with a unique emphasis on filmmaking, shooting sports, and computer programming until its destruction in the 2025 Palisades Fire. Scouting America announced that it intends to rebuild.

Remnants of what once was Josepho's personal mansion can be found between the camp and Murphy Ranch.
