= Olmstead Williams Communications =

Public relations agency

- Industry: Public Relations
- Genre: Technology, healthcare and professional services
- Founder: Tracy Olmstead Williams
- Headquarters: Los Angeles, CA
- Number of locations: Offices in Los Angeles and Seattle
- Website: olmsteadwilliams.com

Olmstead Williams Communications is a Los Angeles-based public relations agency.

== History ==
Olmstead Williams Communications was founded in 2008 by Tracy Williams.

== Recognition ==
Founder Tracy Olmstead Williams was named to the Los Angeles Business Journal's "Who's Who in Los Angeles Business" on January 6, 2014, January 5, 2015, and again on January 4, 2016.

In November 2013, Olmstead Williams Communications won in 2 out of 63 categories of the 2013 PRism Award from PRSA-Los Angeles: for a pro bono campaign for the Western Los Angeles County Council of the Boy Scouts, "Inclusion Now for All Gay Boy Scouts and Leaders: Western LA County Council Sends Clear Message", and for a non-profit campaign "POPP’s Path to Middle Class Pay: Arresting Interest in Police Work for Inner City Kids".
