= Photo booth =

Photo vending machine

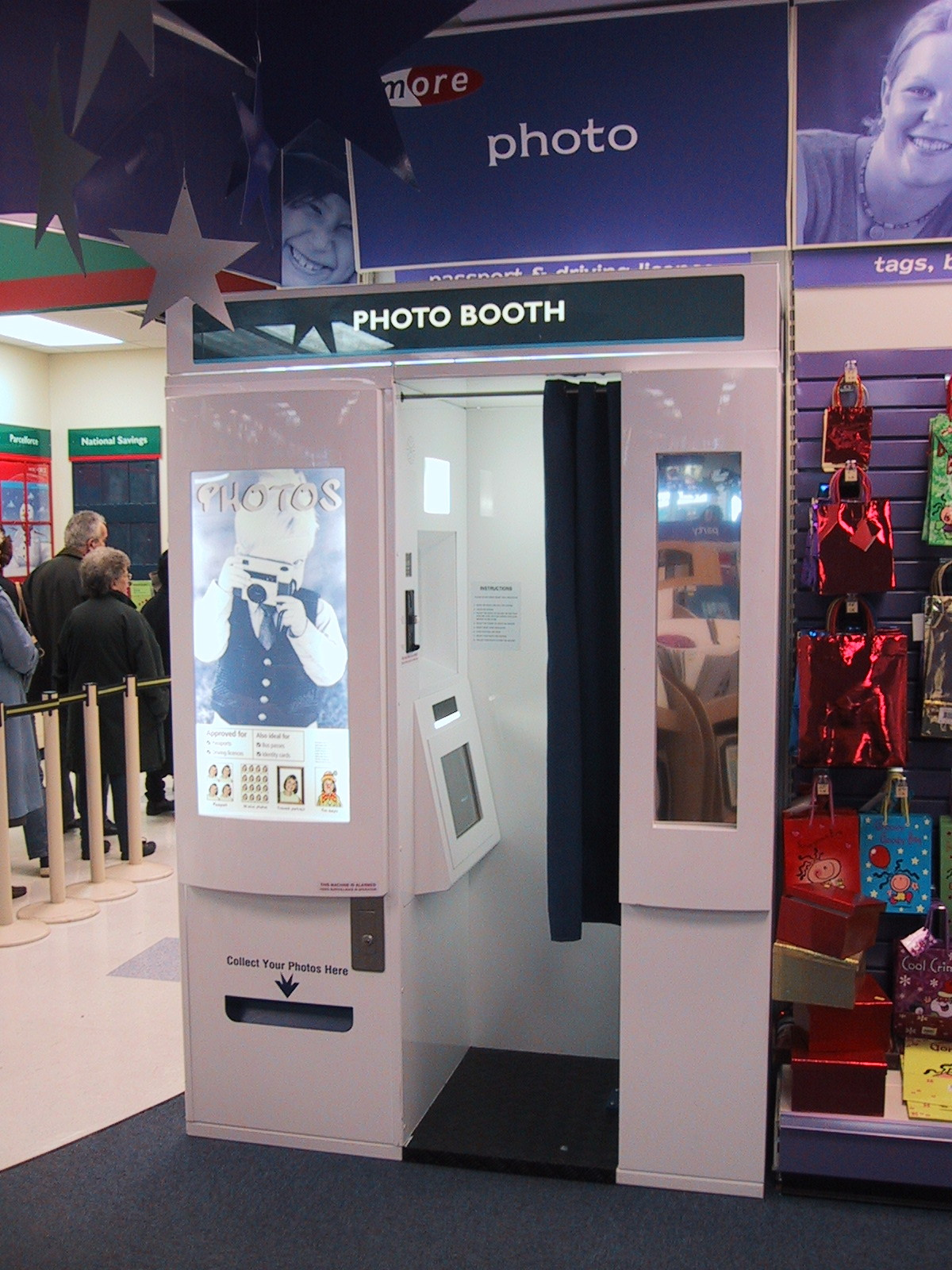
A Snap Digital Imaging booth in the UK

A photo booth is a vending machine or modern kiosk that contains an automated, usually coin-operated, camera and film processor. Today, the vast majority of photo booths are digital.

== History ==
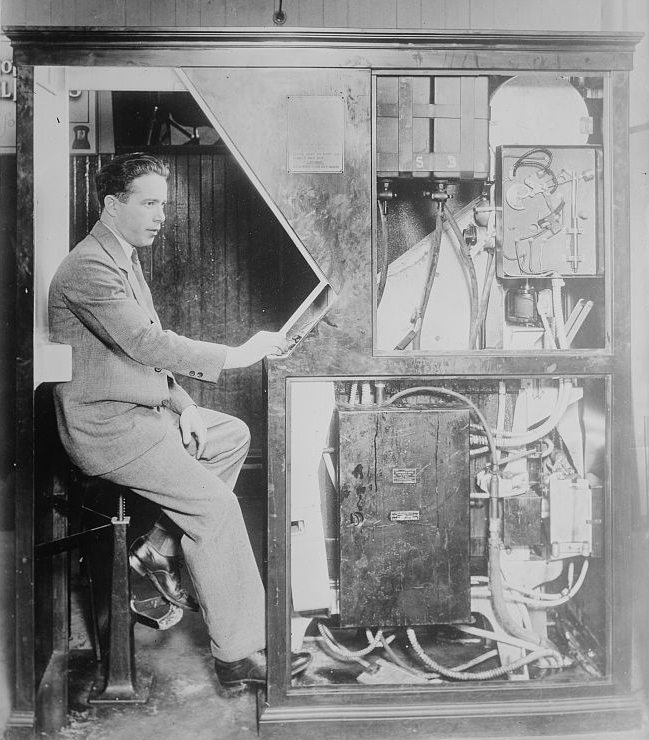
Anatol Josepho inside his photo booth

The patent for the first automated photography machine was filed in 1888 by William Pope and Edward Poole of Baltimore. The first known really working photographic machine was a product of the French inventor T. E. Enjalbert (March 1889). It was shown at the 1889 World's Fair in Paris. The German-born photographer Mathew Steffens from Chicago filed a patent for such a machine in May 1889. These early machines were not reliable enough to be self-sufficient. The first commercially successful automatic photographic apparatus was the "Bosco" from inventor Conrad Bernitt of Hamburg (patented July 16, 1890). All of these early machines produced ferrotypes. The first automatic photographic apparatus with negative and positive process was invented by Carl Sasse (1896) of Germany.

The modern concept of photo booth with (later) a curtain originated with Anatol Josepho (previously Josephewitz), who had arrived in the U.S. from Russia in 1923. In 1925, the first photo booth appeared on Broadway in New York City. For 25 cents, the booth took, developed, and printed 8 photos, a process taking roughly 10 minutes. In the first six months after the booth was erected, it was used by 280,000 people. The Photomaton Company was created to place booths nationwide. On March 27, 1927, Josepho was paid $1 million and guaranteed future royalties for his invention.

In the United Kingdom, entrepreneur Clarence Hatry established the Photomaton Parent Corporation, Ltd., in 1928.

== Operation ==
After money has been inserted in the machine, multiple customers can enter the booth and pose for a set number of exposures. Some common options include the ability to alter lighting and backdrops while the newest versions offer features such as cameras from a variety of angles, fans, seats, and blue screen effects. Some establishments even offer costumes and wigs for customers to borrow.

Once the pictures have been taken, the customers select the pictures that they wish to keep and customize them using a touch screen or pen-sensitive screen. The touch screen then displays a vast array of options such as virtual stamps, pictures, clip art, colorful backdrops, borders, and pens that can be superimposed on the photographs.

Features that can be found in some sticker machines are customizing the beauty of the customers such as brightening the pictures, making the eyes sparkle more, changing the hair, bringing a more reddish color to the lips, and fixing any blemishes by having them blurred. Other features include cutting out the original background and replacing it with a different background. Certain backgrounds may be chosen so when the machine prints out the picture, the final sticker will be shiny with sparkles.

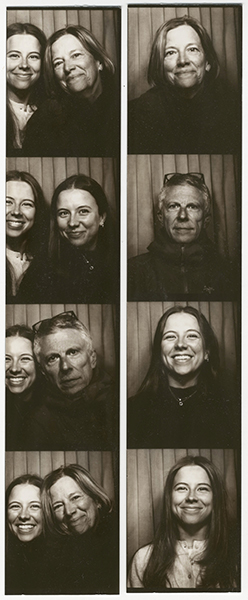
Old Friend Photo Booth, New York, 2025

Finally, the number and size of the pictures to be printed are chosen, and the pictures print out on a glossy full-color 10 × 15 cm sheet to be cut up and divided among the group of customers. Some photo booths also allow the pictures to be sent to customers' mobile phones. Other photo places have a scanner and laptop at the cashier's desk for customers to scan and copy their original picture before they cut and divide the pictures amongst their group.

== Types of photo booths ==
=== Passport photo booths ===
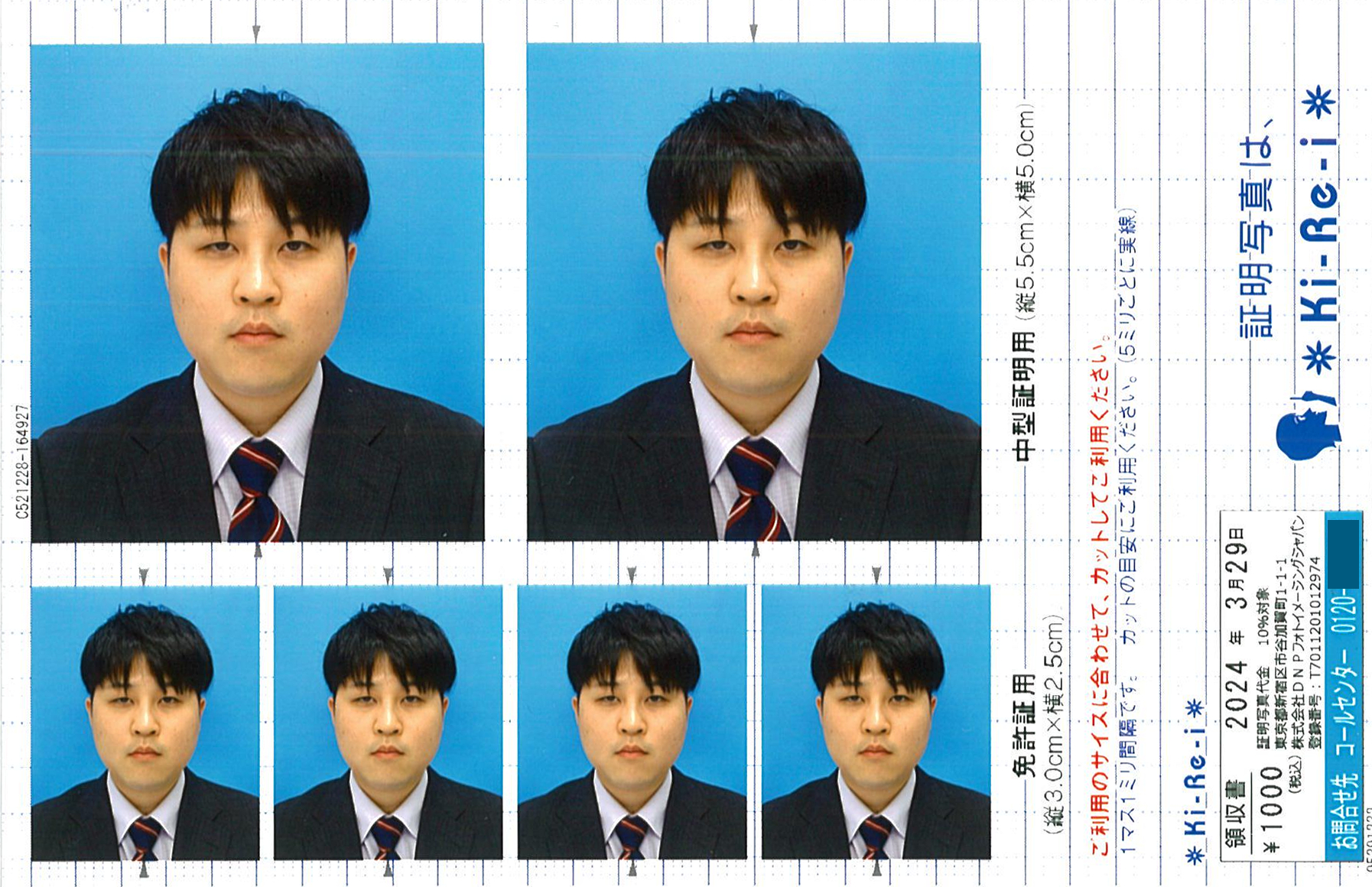
passport photo taken with photo booth

Most of the photo booths are used for passport photos. They are coin-operated automated machines that are designed to print a photo in a specific format that meets the passport photo requirements. Multiple copies can be printed so users can save some for future uses.

Traditionally, photo booths contain a seat or bench designed to seat the one or two patrons being photographed. The seat is typically surrounded by a curtain of some sort to allow for some privacy and help avoid outside interference during the photo session. Once the payment is made, the photo booth will take a series of photographs, although most modern booths may only take a single photograph and print out a series of identical pictures. Before each photograph, there will be an indication, such as a light or a buzzer, that will signal the patron to prepare their pose. Most booths will use artificial lighting, which may be flash or continuous lighting. After the last photograph in the series (typically between 3 and 8) has been taken, the photo booth begins developing the film — a process that used to take several minutes in the old "wet chemistry" booths, but is now typically accomplished in about 30 seconds with digital technology. The prints are then delivered to the customer. Typical dimensions of these prints vary. The classic and most familiar arrangement from the old style photo booths is four pictures on a strip about 40 mm wide by 205 mm long; digital prints tend to have a square arrangement of two images above two images.

Both black and white and colour photo booths are common in the US, however in Europe the colour photo booth has almost entirely replaced black and white booths. However, newer digital booths now offer the customer the option of whether to print in colour or in black and white. Most modern photo booths use video or digital cameras instead of film cameras, and are under computer control. Some booths can also produce stickers, postcards, or other items with the photographs on them, rather or as well as simply a strip of pictures. These often include an option of novelty decorative borders around the photos.

=== Photo sticker booths ===
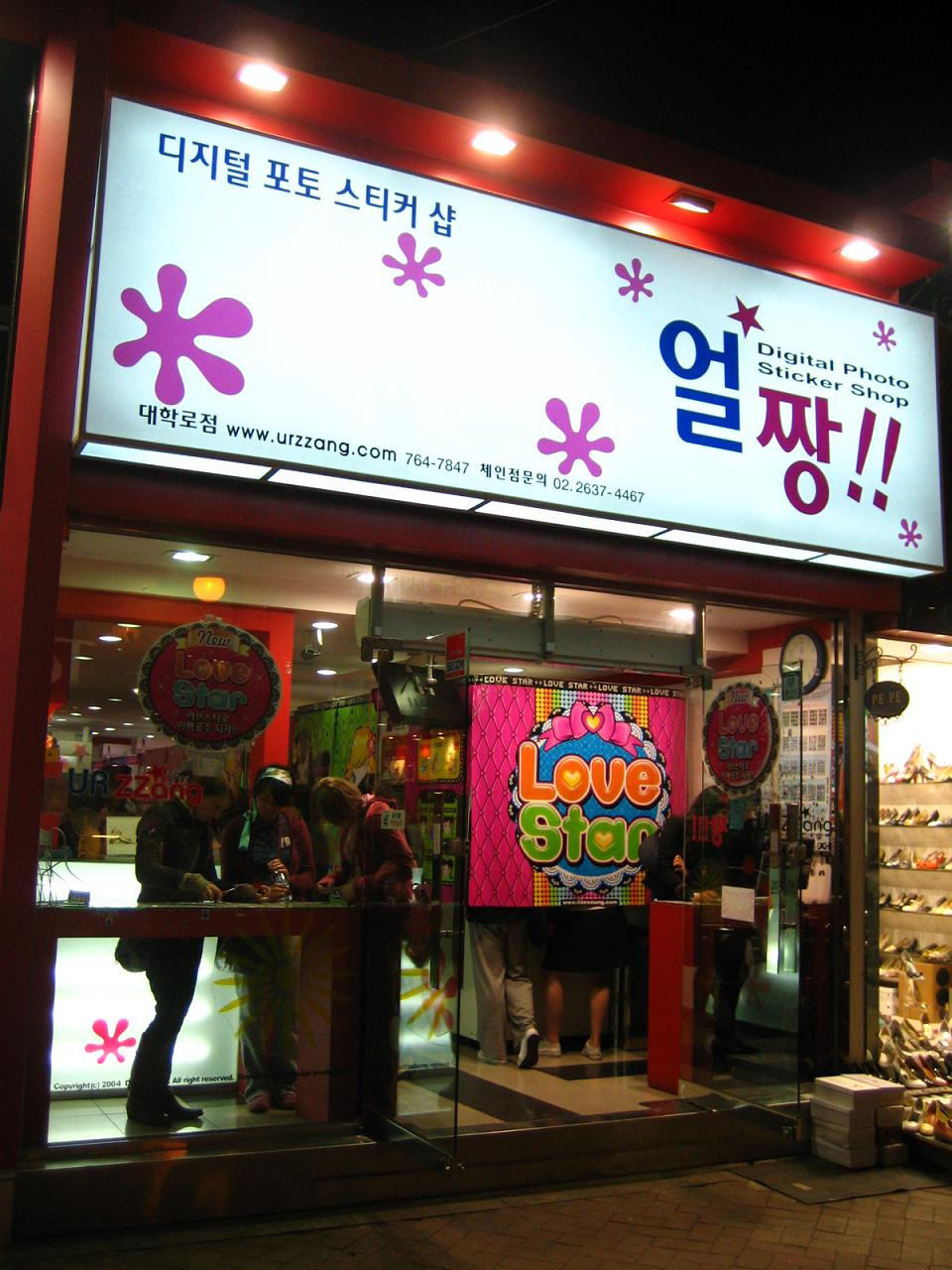
Photo sticker shop in Seoul, South Korea

Photo sticker booths or photo sticker machines originated from Japan (see Purikura below). They are a special type of photo booth that produce photo stickers. Still maintaining huge popularity in Japan, they have spread throughout Asia to Taiwan, South Korea, Hong Kong, Singapore, Malaysia, Philippines, China, Vietnam, and Thailand. They have also been imported to Australia. Some have also begun appearing in the United States and Canada although they failed to make any impression in Europe when introduced in the mid-1990s.

=== Purikura ===
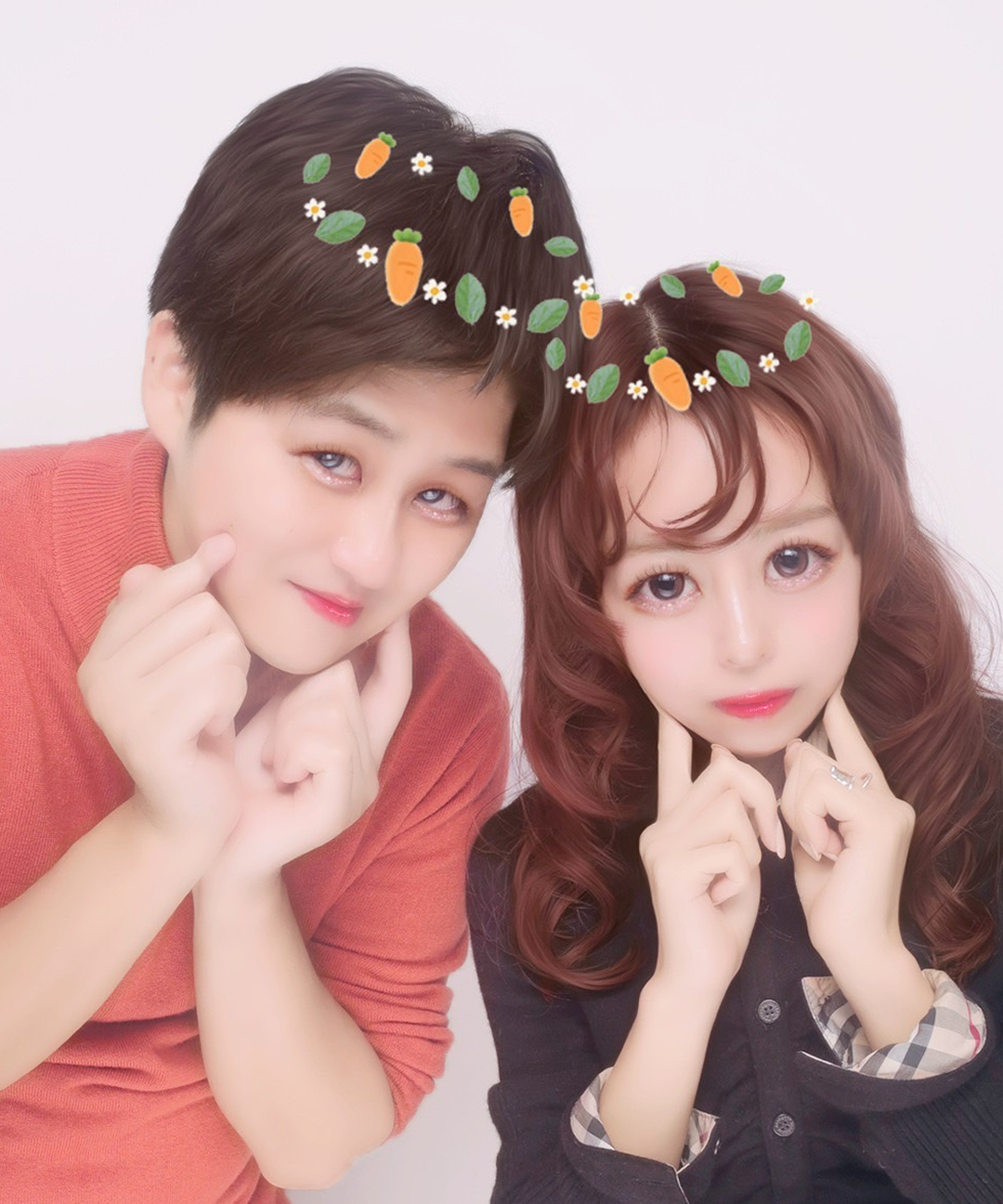
Photo sticker that various effects designed with Purikura

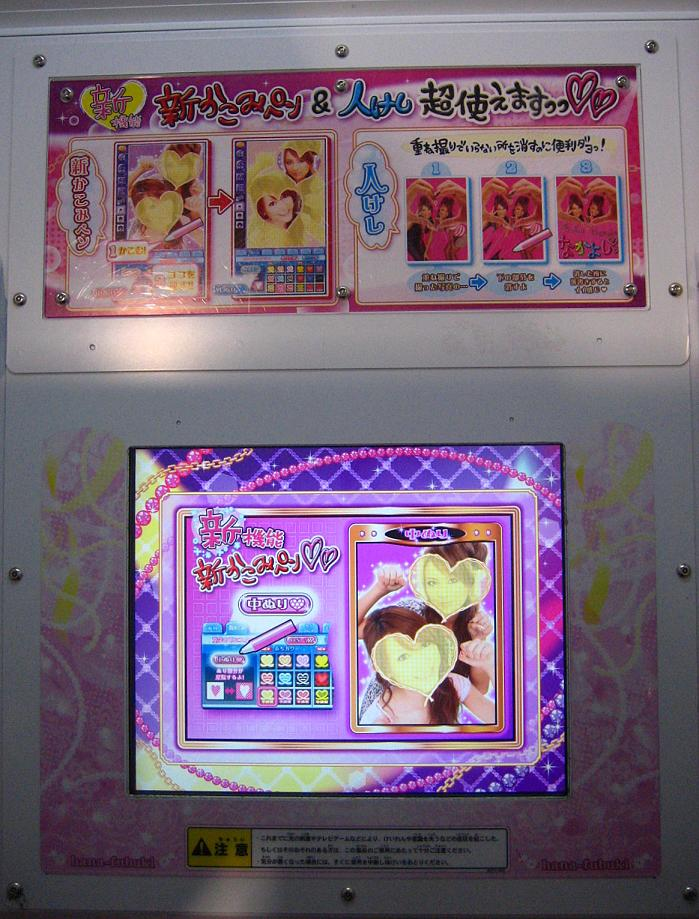
A pen-sensitive touchscreen for decorating photos inside a purikura photo booth in Fukushima City, Japan

In Japan, purikura (プリクラ) refers to a photo sticker booth or the product of such a photo booth. The name is a shortened form of the registered Atlus/Sega trademark Print Club (プリント倶楽部, Purinto Kurabu), the first purikura machine, introduced to arcades in 1995.

Purikura produce what are today called selfies. Purikura is essentially a cross between a traditional license/passport photo booth and an arcade video game, with a computer which allows the manipulation of digital images. It involves users posing in front of a camera within the compact booth, having their images taken, and then printing the photos with various effects designed to look kawaii. It presents a series of choices, such as desired backdrops, borders, insertable decorations, icons, text writing options, hair extensions, twinkling diamond tiaras, tenderized light effects, and predesigned decorative margins.

==== History of purikura ====
Purikura has roots in Japanese kawaii culture, which involves an obsession with beautifying self-representation in photographic forms, particularly among females. Purikura originate from the Japanese video game arcade industry. It was conceived in 1994 by Sasaki Miho, inspired by the popularity of girl photo culture and photo stickers in 1990s Japan. She worked for a Japanese game company, Atlus, where she suggested the idea, but was initially rejected. Atlus eventually decided to pursue Miho's idea, and developed it with the help of a leading Japanese video game company, Sega, which later became the owner of Atlus. Sega and Atlus introduced Print Club, the first purikura, in February 1995, initially at game arcades, before expanding to other popular locations such as fast food shops, train stations, karaoke establishments and bowling alleys. Game Machine magazine listed Printing Club as Japan's most successful arcade game in the non-video game category during early 1996, and it went on to become the overall highest-grossing arcade game of 1996 in Japan. By 1997, about 45,000 Purikura machines had been sold, earning Sega an estimated ¥25 billion (£173 million) or $283,000,000 (equivalent to $568,000,000 in 2025) annually from Purikura sales that year. Print Club went on to generate over $1 billion in sales for Atlus and Sega.

The success of the original Sega-Atlus machine led to other Japanese arcade game companies producing their own purikura, including SNK's Neo Print in 1996 and Konami's Puri Puri Campus (Print Print Campus) in 1997, with Sega controlling about half of the market that year. Purikura became a popular form of entertainment among youths in Japan, then East Asia, in the 1990s. To capitalize on the purikura phenomenon, Japanese mobile phones began including a front-facing camera, which facilitated the creation of selfies, during the late 1990s to early 2000s. Photographic features in purikura were later adopted by smartphone apps such as Instagram and Snapchat, including scribbling graffiti or typing text over selfies, adding features that beautify the image, and photo editing options such as cat whiskers or bunny ears.

=== Korean-style photo booths ===
South Korea’s photo-booth renaissance gathered pace in the late 2010s, led by chains such as Life Four Cut (인생네컷), Photoism, Photomatic, and Haru Film.

These booths emphasise a studio-style portrait look—typically using DSLR or mirrorless cameras with a slightly high-angle lens position, soft continuous lighting, slim vertical “four-cut’’ or receipt-style strips, seasonal decorative frames, and muted film-look filters.

By the early-2020s they had become ubiquitous along shopping streets, cafés, subway stations, festivals and K-pop fan-event venues, often operating 24 hours and offering QR-code downloads and cashless payment.

The K-style booth format has since expanded beyond Korea, with permanent outlets or pop-ups reported in Hong Kong, Singapore, the United States and the United Kingdom.

Alongside the major chains, Korean developers and manufacturers — such as Chalkak Studio — provide studio-look booths, vertical-strip layouts and event-driven software to domestic and overseas venues, helping the Korean style become one of the most influential modern photo-booth formats.

=== 3D selfie photo booths ===
A 3D selfie photo booth such as the Fantasitron located at Madurodam, the miniature park, generates 3D selfie models from 2D pictures of customers. These selfies are often printed by dedicated 3D printing companies such as Shapeways. These models are also known as 3D portraits, 3D figurines or mini-me figurines.

=== Different types of photo booths ===
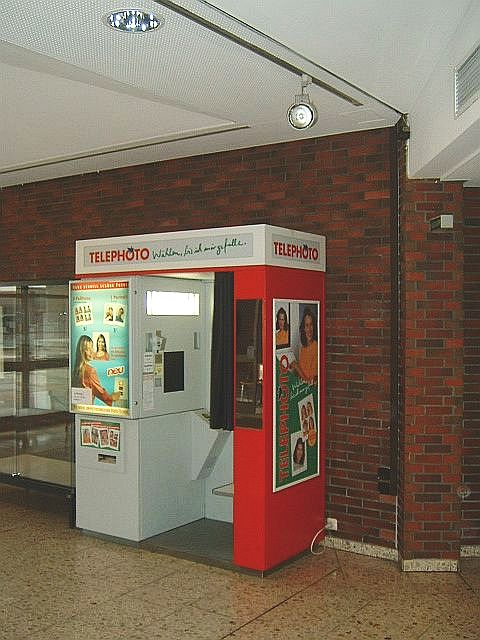
A photo booth in a public building in Germany

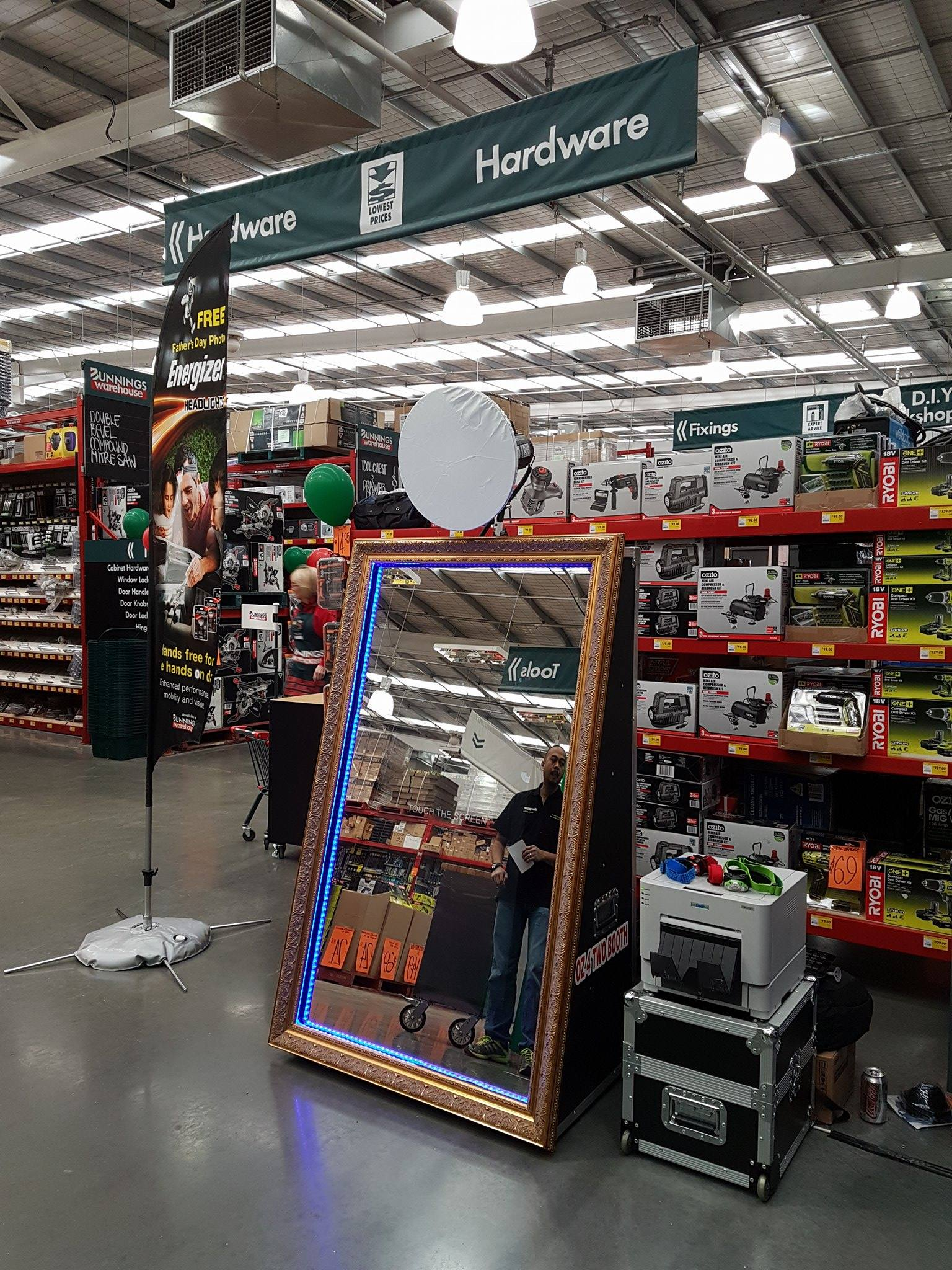
Mirror Me Photobooth in Victoria, Australia

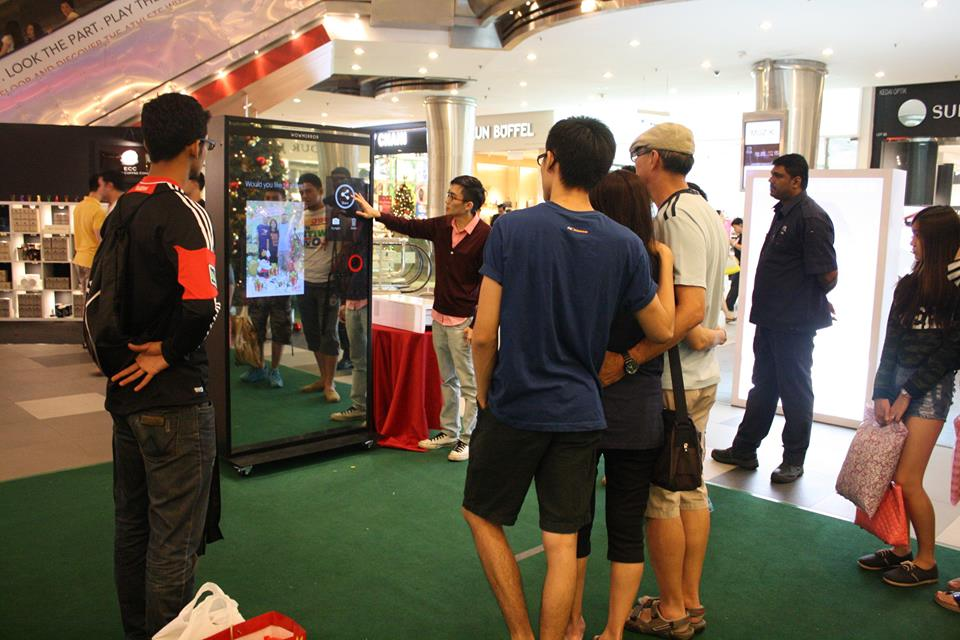
An open-plan photo booth in Lot 10 Shopping Centre in Kuala Lumpur, Malaysia

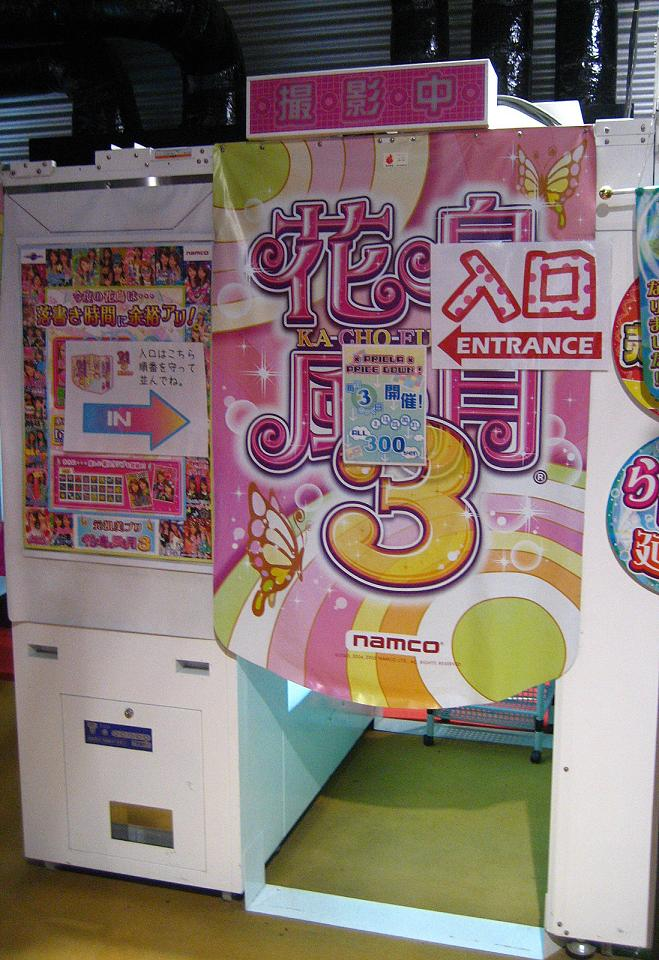
A purikura photo booth in Fukushima, Japan

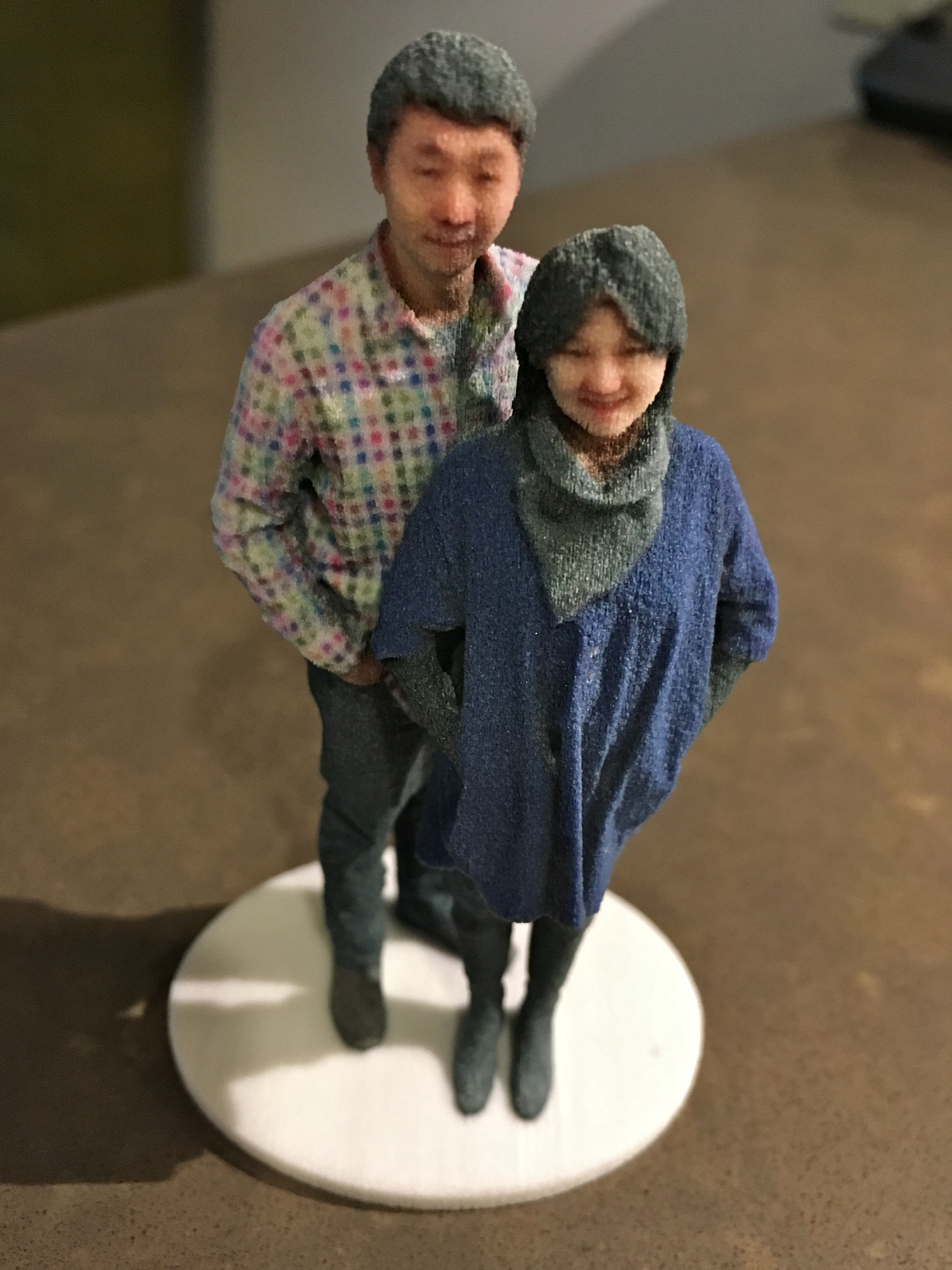
A 3D selfie in 1:20 scale printed by Shapeways using gypsum-based printing

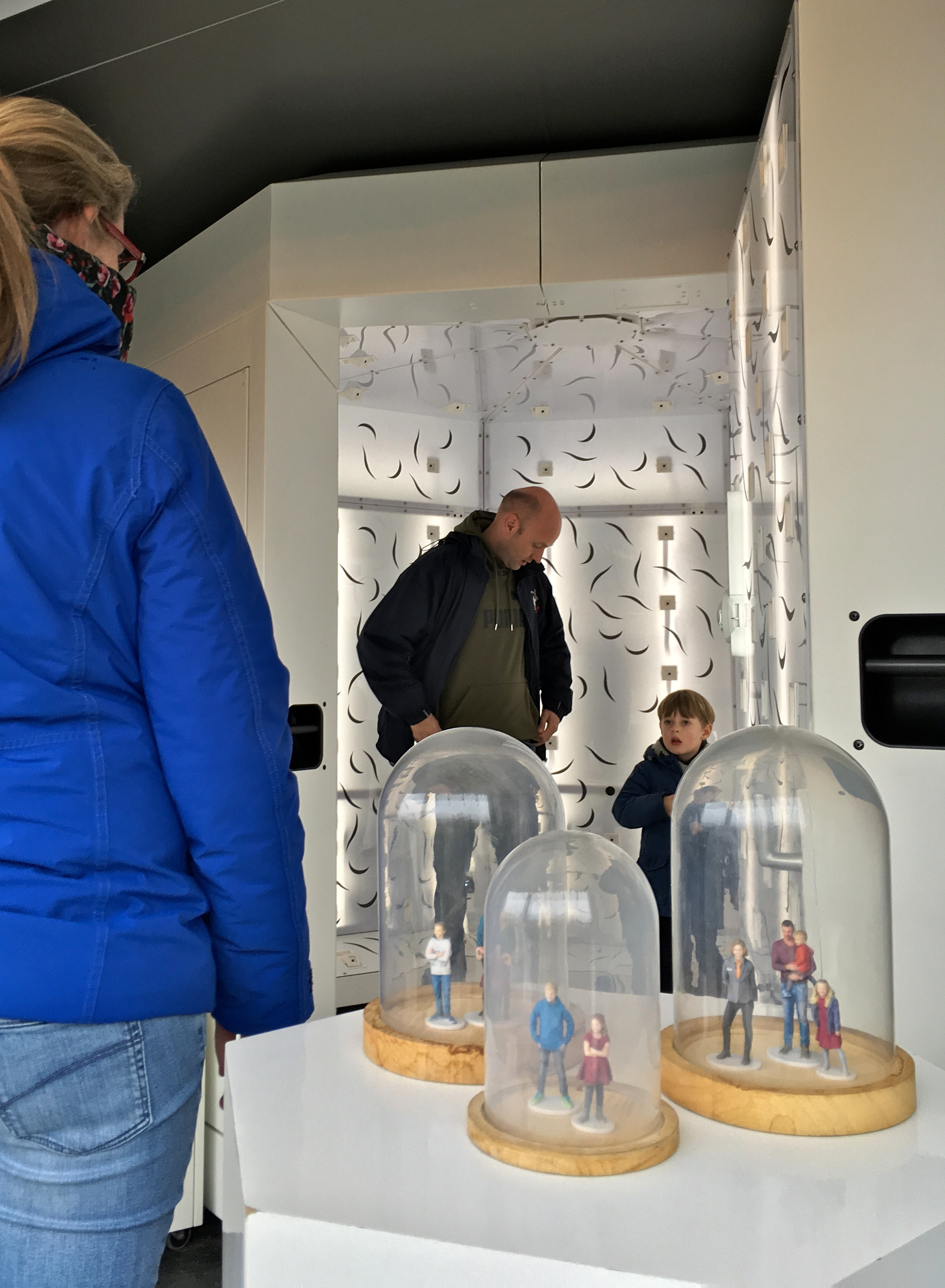
Fantasitron 3D selfie photo booth at Madurodam

== Cultural significance of photo booths ==
=== Purikura ===
Purikura offer rare insight into Japanese popular culture, specifically girl culture. Purikura is a social activity, rarely done alone. It is also now an established form of entertainment, with most Japanese having tried it at least once. The wide lexicon associated with purikura also reveals that it has grown outside kawaii culture; erotic purikura, creepy purikura, and couples purikura are all genres of this popular form of self-photography. Graffiti purikura, an alternative genre of purikura, represents young females' desire to rebel from traditional gender roles. In order to contradict stereotypical images of Japanese women as docile and meek, graffiti purikura photographers may photograph themselves in unflattering fashion or add stickers which defy cuteness, such as the poop emoji. Rather than simple conceited frivolity, purikura photography demonstrates ingenuity and creativity on the part of young Japanese women seeking forms of self-expression.

=== Flinders Street Station photo booth ===
Located at the Elizabeth Street exit of Melbourne's busiest railway station, Flinders Street Station, lies a culturally significant photo booth. The photo booth has been continuously operating at the station since 1961, with many feeling it has become an iconic and irreplaceable part of the station. It has been maintained for the entirety of its life by owner Alan Adler. During May 2018, Mr Adler (then 86) was given 10 days notice to remove the photo booth by Metro Trains Victoria to make way for station upgrades. Alan informed passerby with a hand written note explaining the news prompting widespread backlash from the public and support for Alan and his photo booth. After a letter writing campaign to Metro Trains, Public Transport Victoria CEO Jeroen Weimar phoned Alan to apologise and assured him a new home would be found. Days later they successfully relocated the photo booth to another location within Flinders Street Station. The photo booth shoots analogue images in black and white and joins 3 images together vertically. The three photo format is unusual and adds to the booth's international attraction and reputation. Most photo booths internationally print a narrower 4 image strip. The three image strip is a legacy of a time when the booths were used for things like identification cards for taxi drivers which required a wider image.

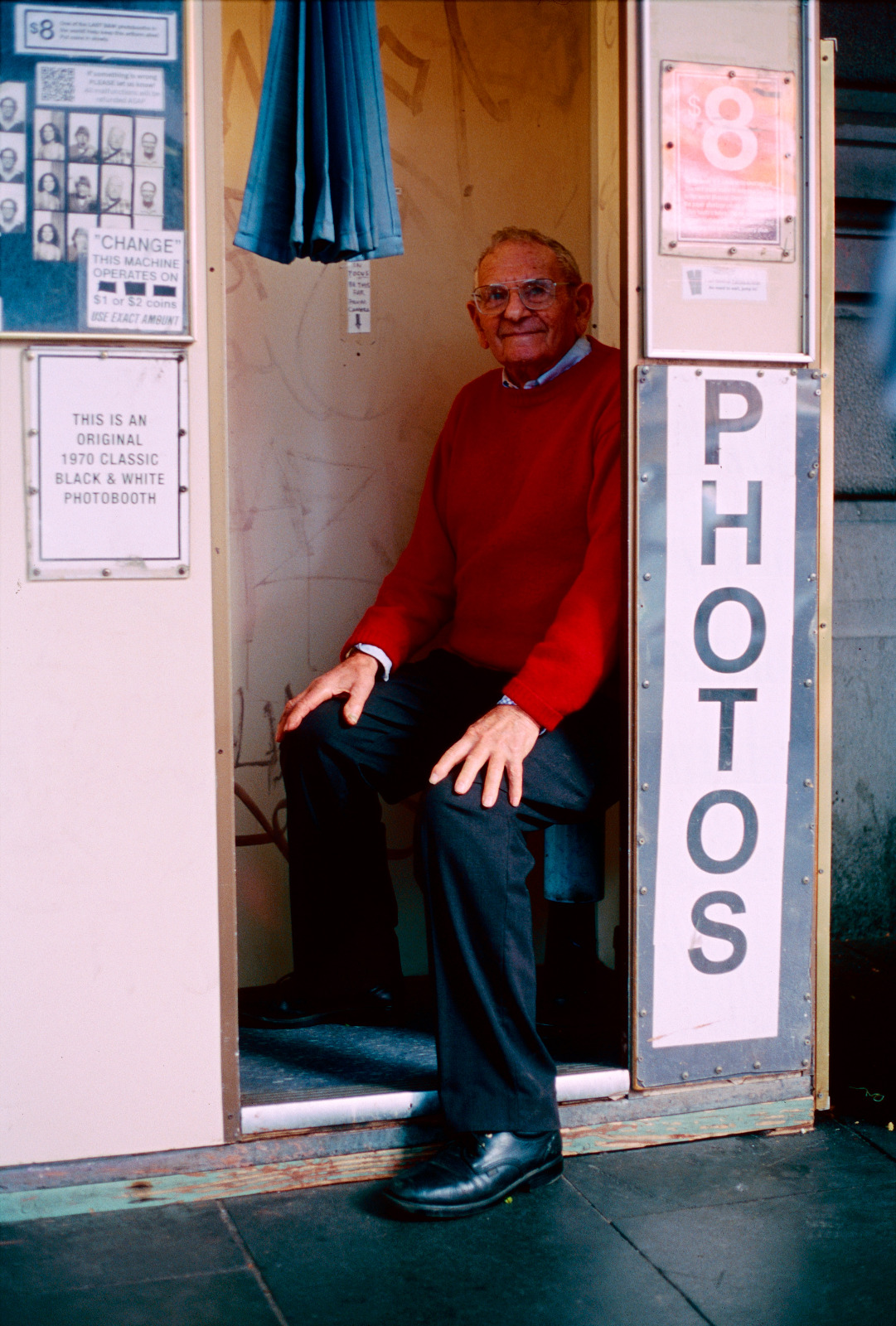
Alan Adler at his Flinders Street photo booth on 23 May 2024

Alan Adler was acknowledged in 2023 as "Melbourne's most photographed man" in an article in The Age, after 50 years of maintaining and adjusting his booths involved innumerable photo strips. Alan died at 92 years of age on 18 Dec 2024, leaving a legacy of millions of images of residents and visitors to Melbourne. For a man who didn't consider himself a photographer, he left a body of work larger than almost anyone alive.

Alan's work has been curated into a book, "Auto-Photo: A Life in Portraits." In June 2025 Alan's life work was celebrated in an exhibition with the same name at RMIT Melbourne, coinciding with 100 years since the first photobooth commenced operation in New York.

When Alan announced by way of a note on the Flinders Street booth that he was retiring and the booth would no longer be there after May 23, 2018, it prompted Chris Sutherland and Jess Norman to initially assist in the booth maintenance. The pair had a long term emotional attachment to the Flinders Street photo booth and recognized its place as a Melbourne icon. Several years later the pair set about purchasing Alan's booths and creating Metro Auto Photo to continue his legacy. Assisted by Lance Weeks from Burnt Out Electronics, Sutherland and Norman now continue Adler's life work operating his original photo booths in Melbourne, while also restoring and commissioning booths that have not operated for decades to new Melbourne locations.

=== Amélie ===
In the 2001 French film Amélie, the photobooth is an essential element of the story. Amélie (Audrey Tautou) encounters Nino (Mathieu Kassovitz) collected unwanted photos under a photobooth and collects these artefacts in a photo album. Photobooth pictures become a means of communication between the characters as well as characters themselves.

=== Photo booths for parties ===
Photo booth rental companies allow a person to rent a photo booth for a short period of time (usually in hours) for a fee. Photo booth rentals have become popular in the United States primarily for wedding receptions, sweet sixteen parties, Bar and Bat Mitzvah parties, along with a growing number of other public and private events. In addition to the photo booth and the printing of unlimited photo strips, rental companies usually include a photo booth attendant to service the photo booth and to help guests construct the guest book of photo strips. Online image hosting, compact discs containing the images and related merchandise are readily available. Celebrities are frequent users of photo booths in parties.

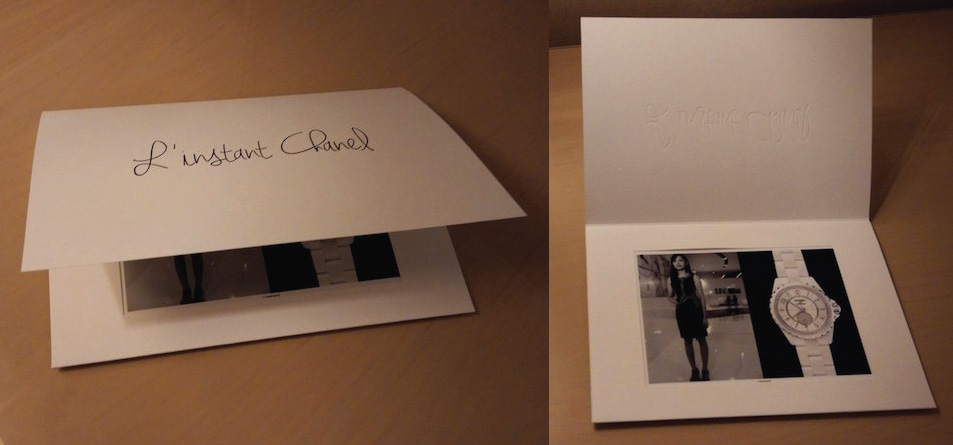
A photo printed from a Chanel event in Singapore in 2013

Apart from traditional photo printing, modern photo booths may also include the following new functions:

- Animated GIF
- Flip book printing
- Virtual props, placed intelligently on the person's eyes or shoulders etc.
- Slow-motion video
- Green-screen background removal
- Fun costume virtual dressing
- Games - mostly Kinect body gesture controlled games, and print a photo of the person and his/her scores
- Facial gesture recognition

== Growth of photo booth rentals ==
As digital cameras, compact photo printers, and flat screen computer monitors became widely available in the early 2000s, people connected these together using a personal computer and software and created their own photo booths. Entrepreneurs began renting machines built along these lines at weddings and parties and the idea spread. From 2005 to 2012, interest in the United States for photo booth rentals grew significantly. By 2016, more people were searching for photo booth rentals than DJ rentals in 15 of North America's largest cities. In Greater Los Angeles alone, there are now more than 600 photo booth rental companies. Photo booth rentals have also become popular in other countries such as Canada, Australia, and the UK. So far in 2016, there is an average of 226,000 monthly searches for a photo booth globally. This has risen by 48.9% since 2015 (in the UK alone this is nearly 20,000 searches a month).
