= Miquin Woods Preserve =

Scout camp in Glen Gardner, New Jersey

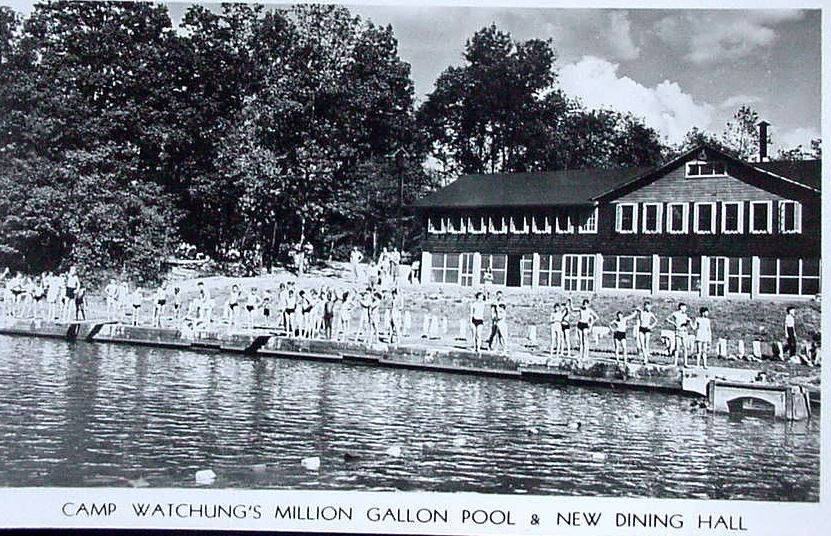
Boy Scouts swimming in the pool at Camp Watchung

Miquin Woods Preserve is a park located in Glen Gardner, New Jersey.

== Gallery ==
Photos of Camp Watchung

Photos of Camp Watchung

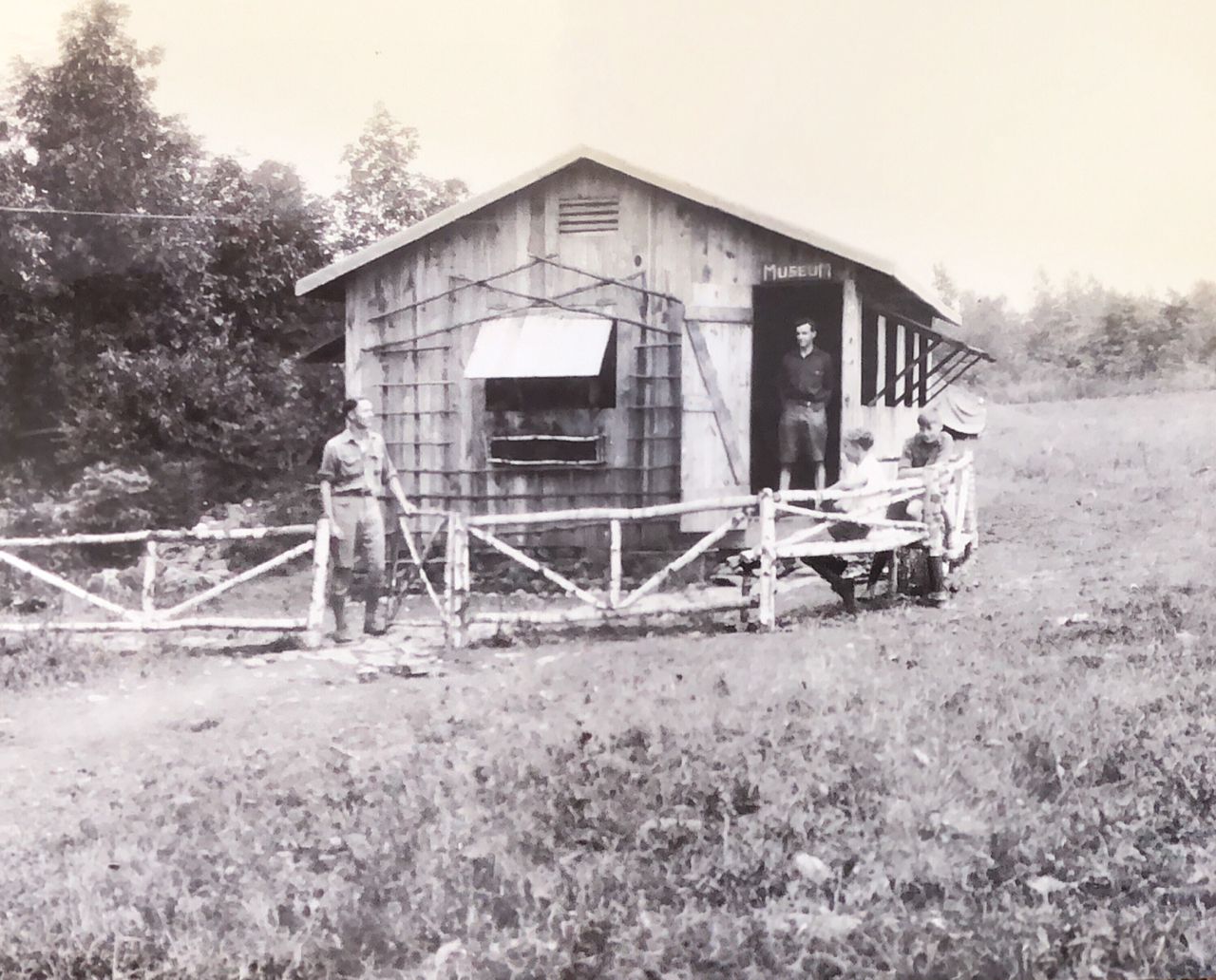
The Camp Museum

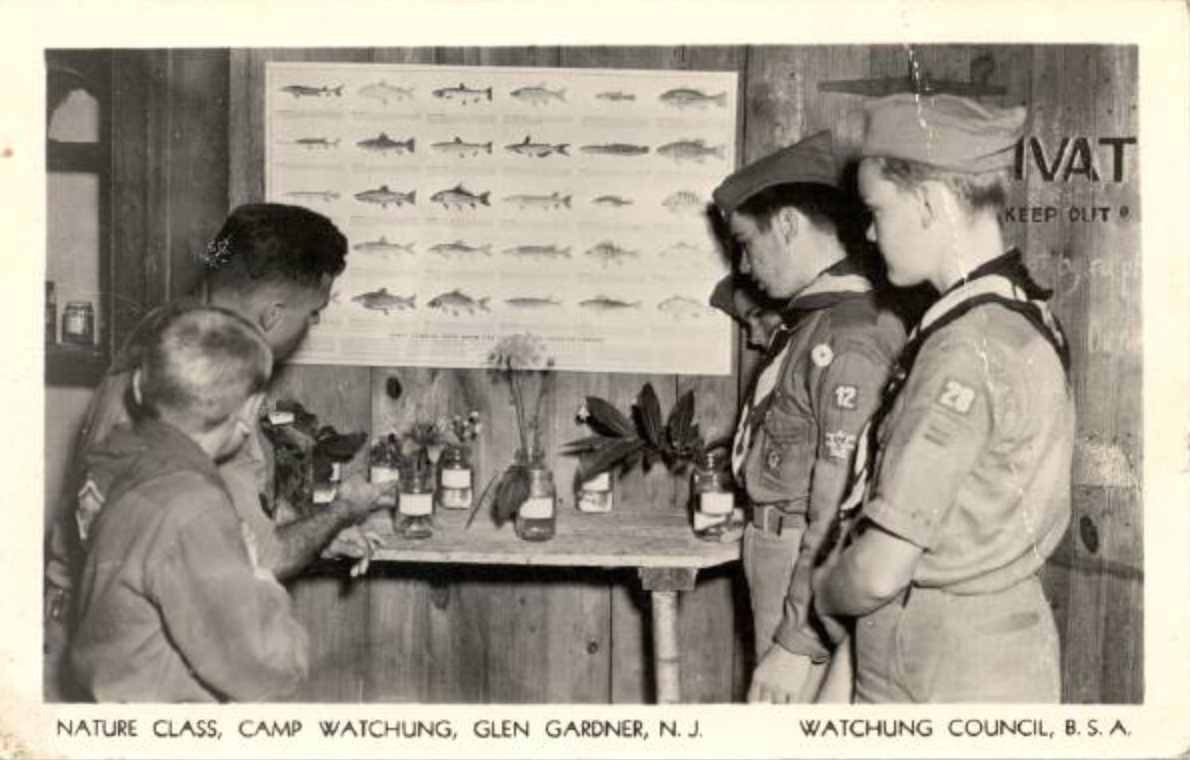
Watchung Council

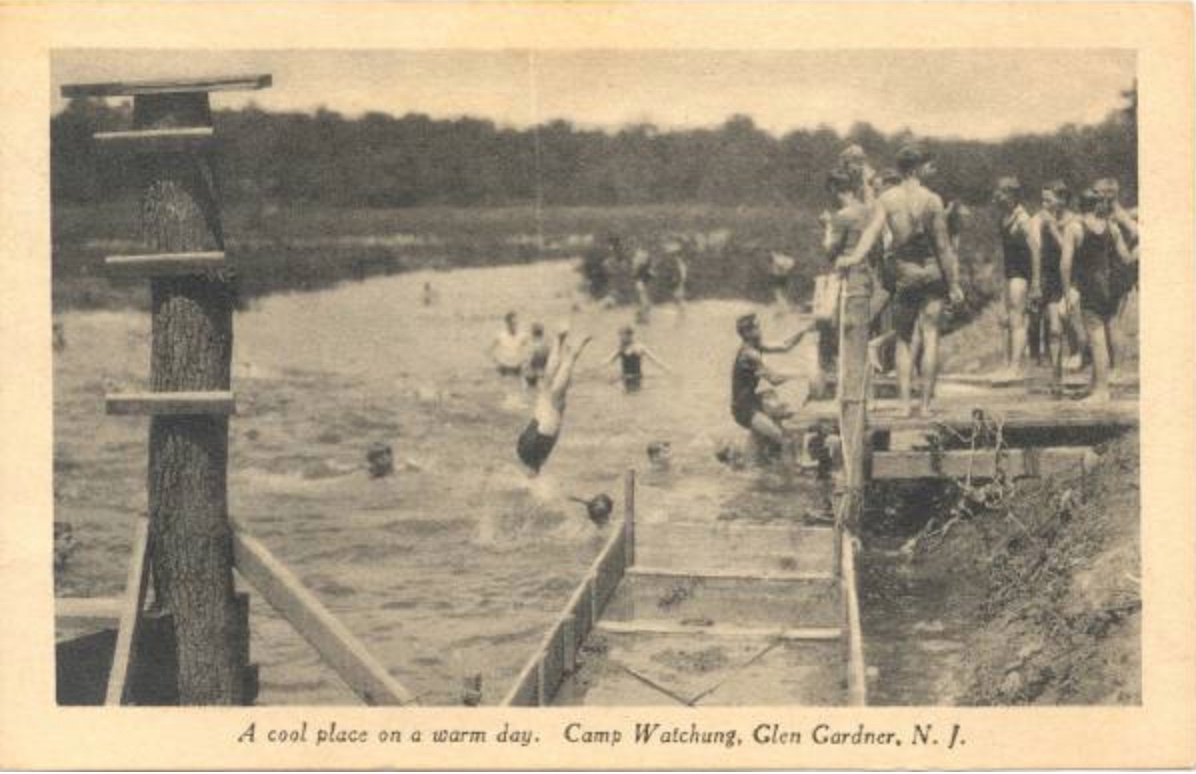
Craig Pond on a warm summer day

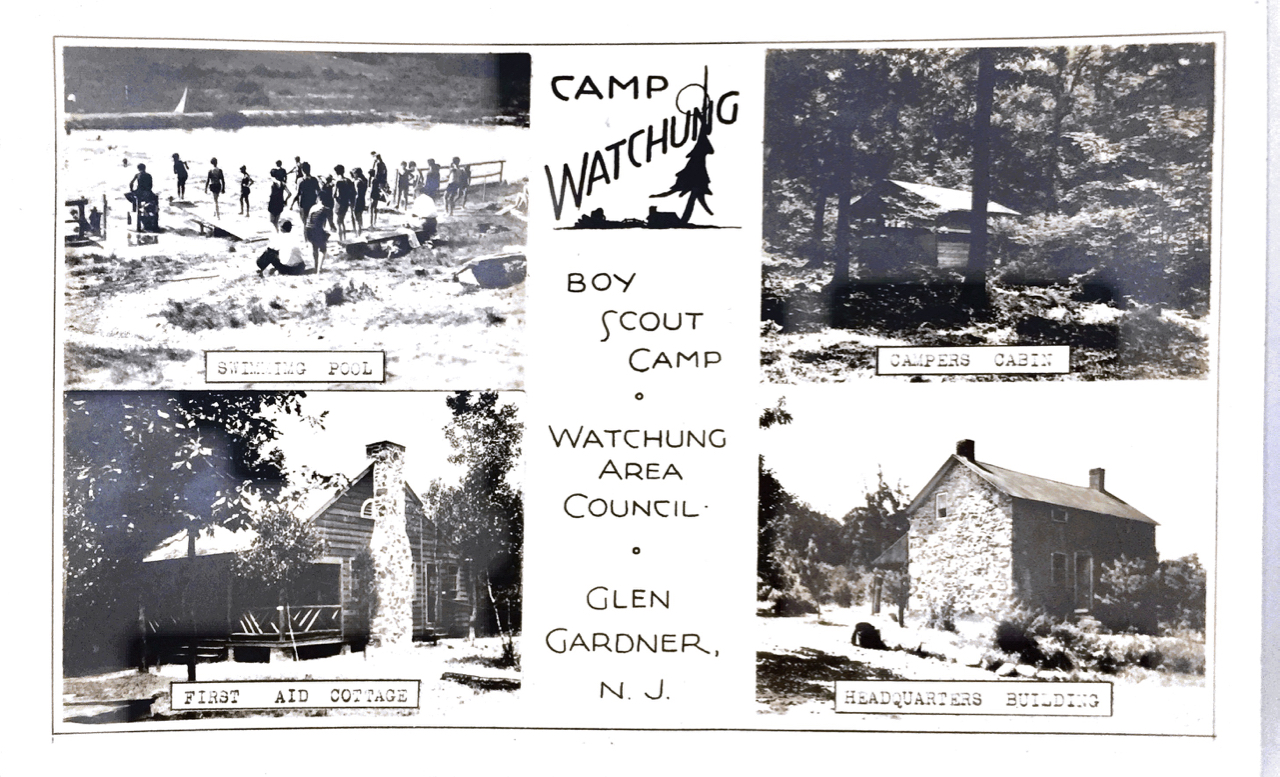
Various Building at Camp Watchung

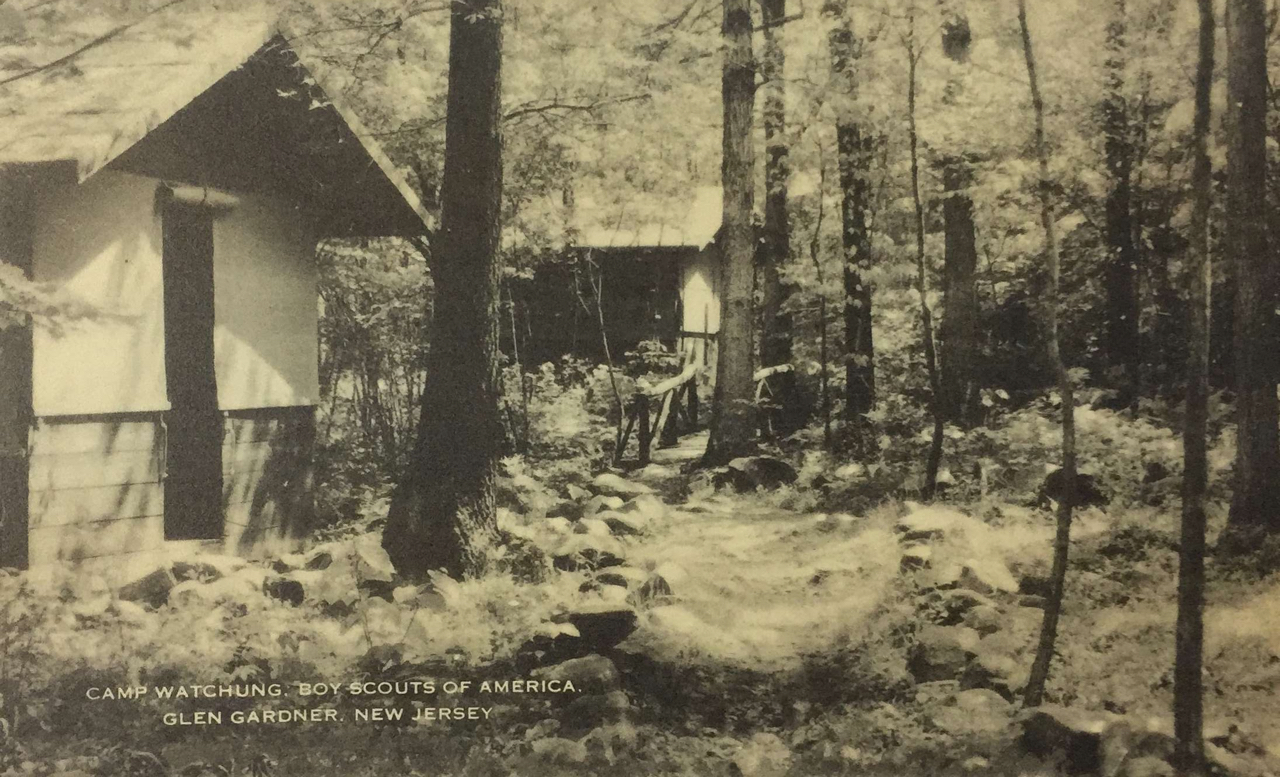
Living Quarters

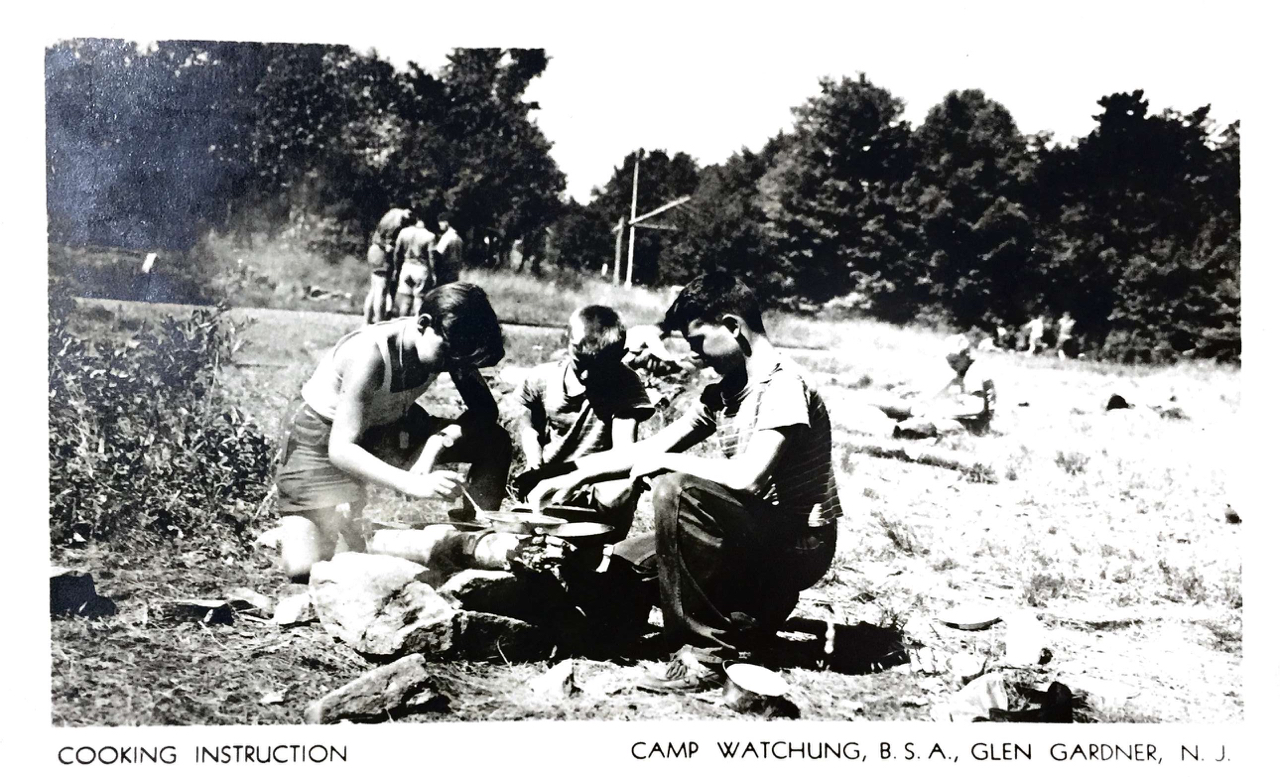
Cooking Instruction at Camp Watchung

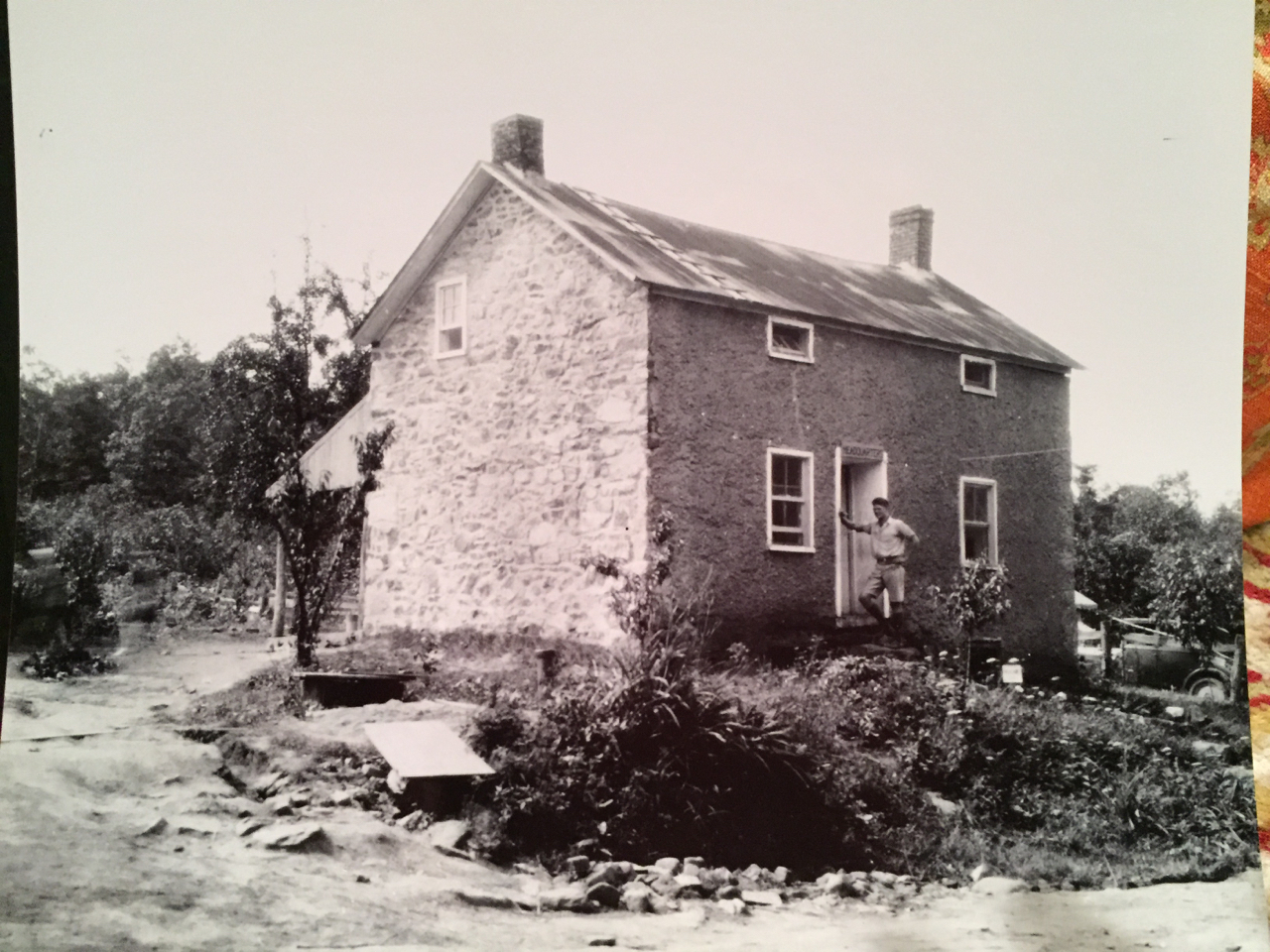
Camp Watchung Headquarters

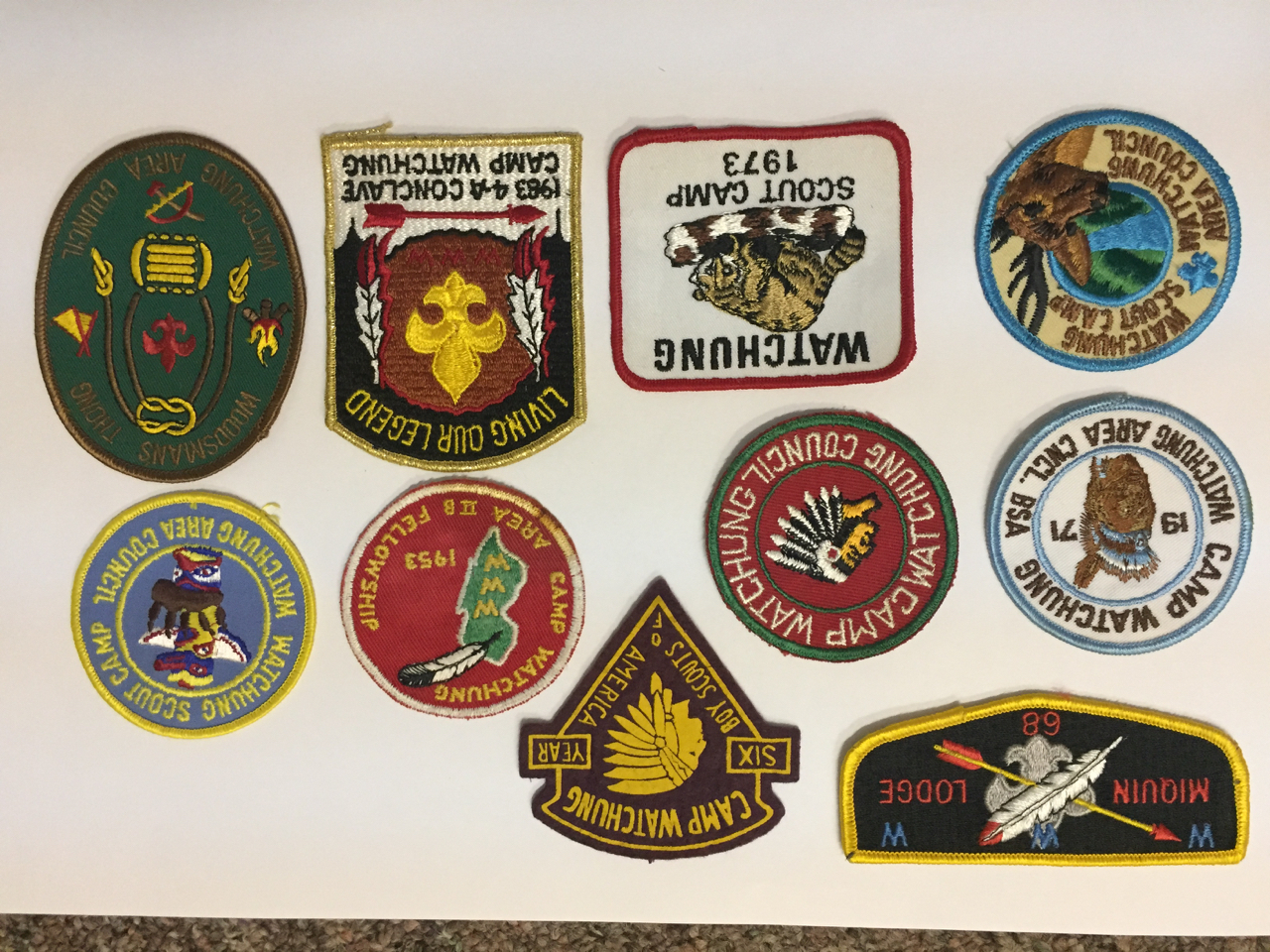
Various Boy Scout Patches

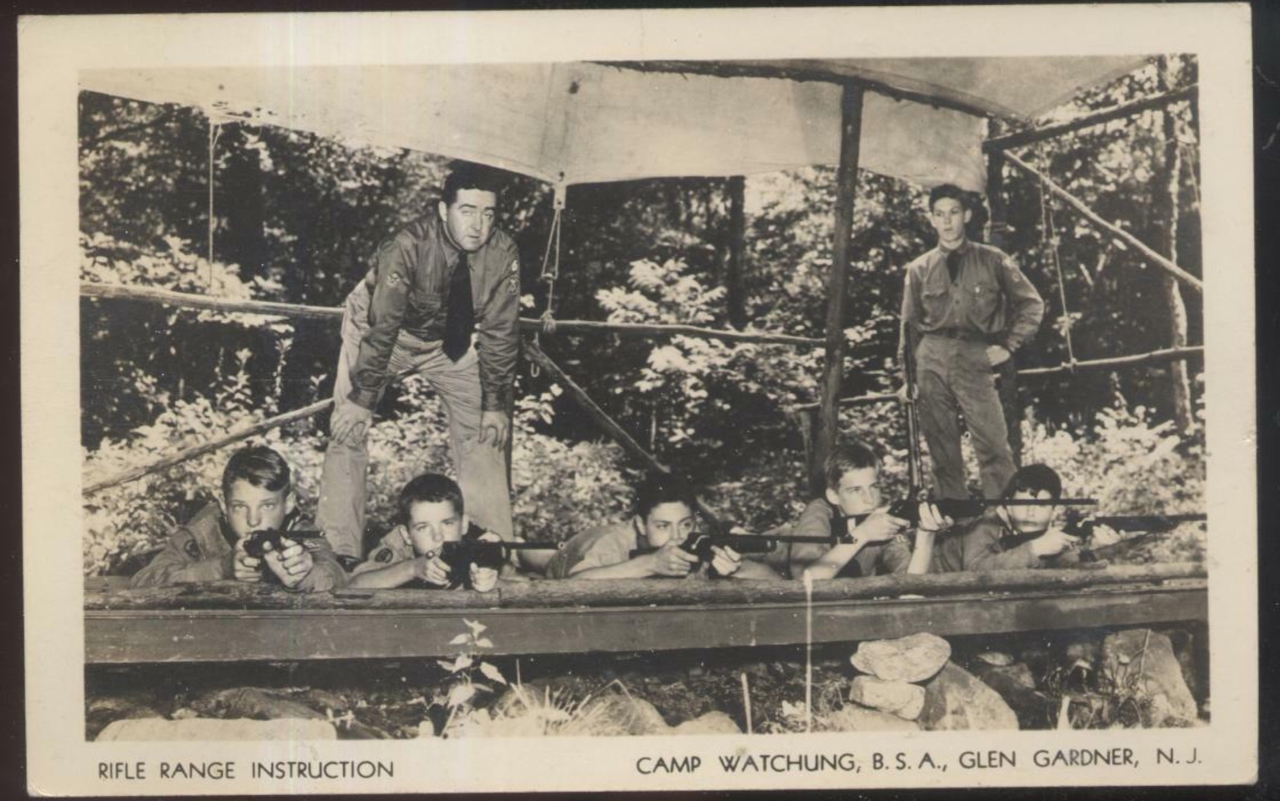
Rifle Range Instruction, 1940's

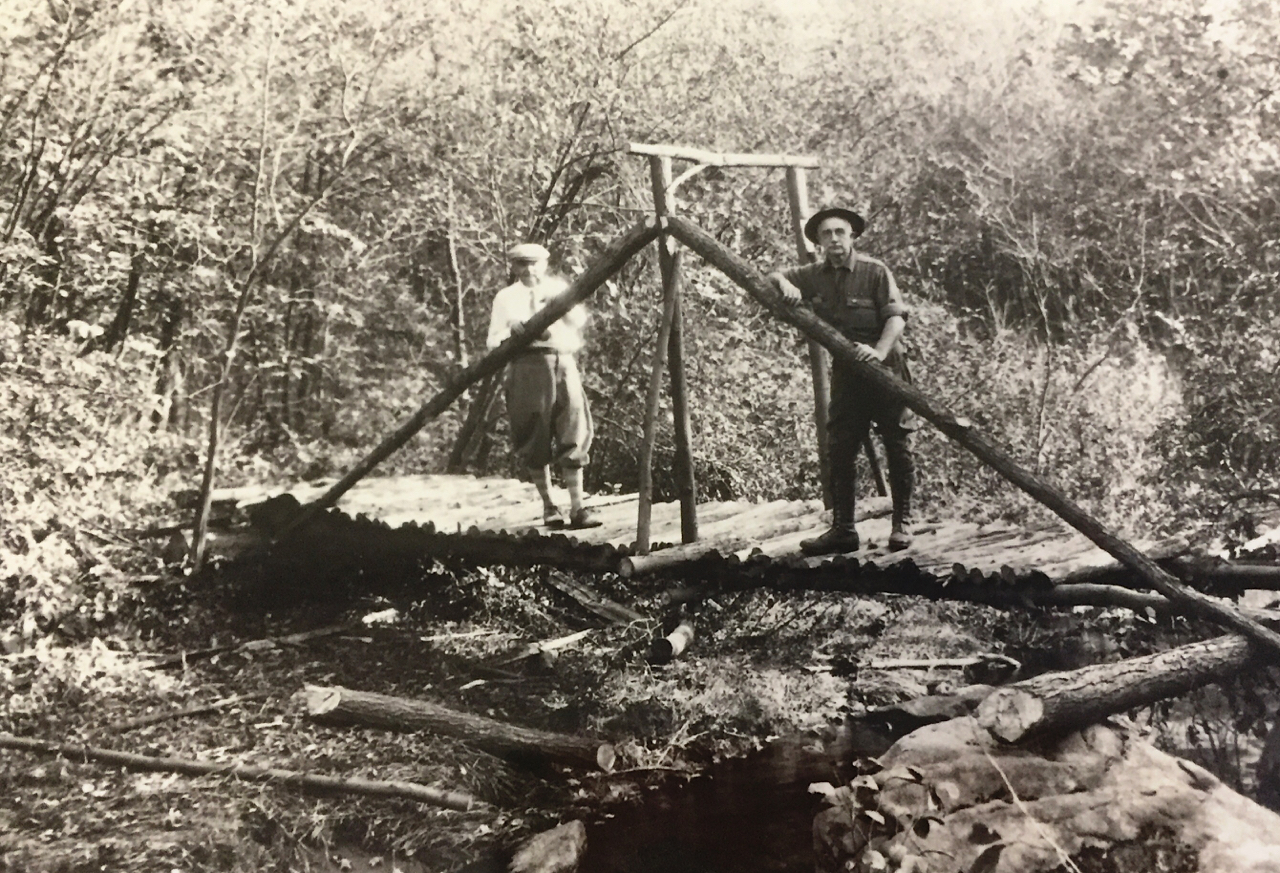
Searing Bridge Crossing Spruce Run, 1928

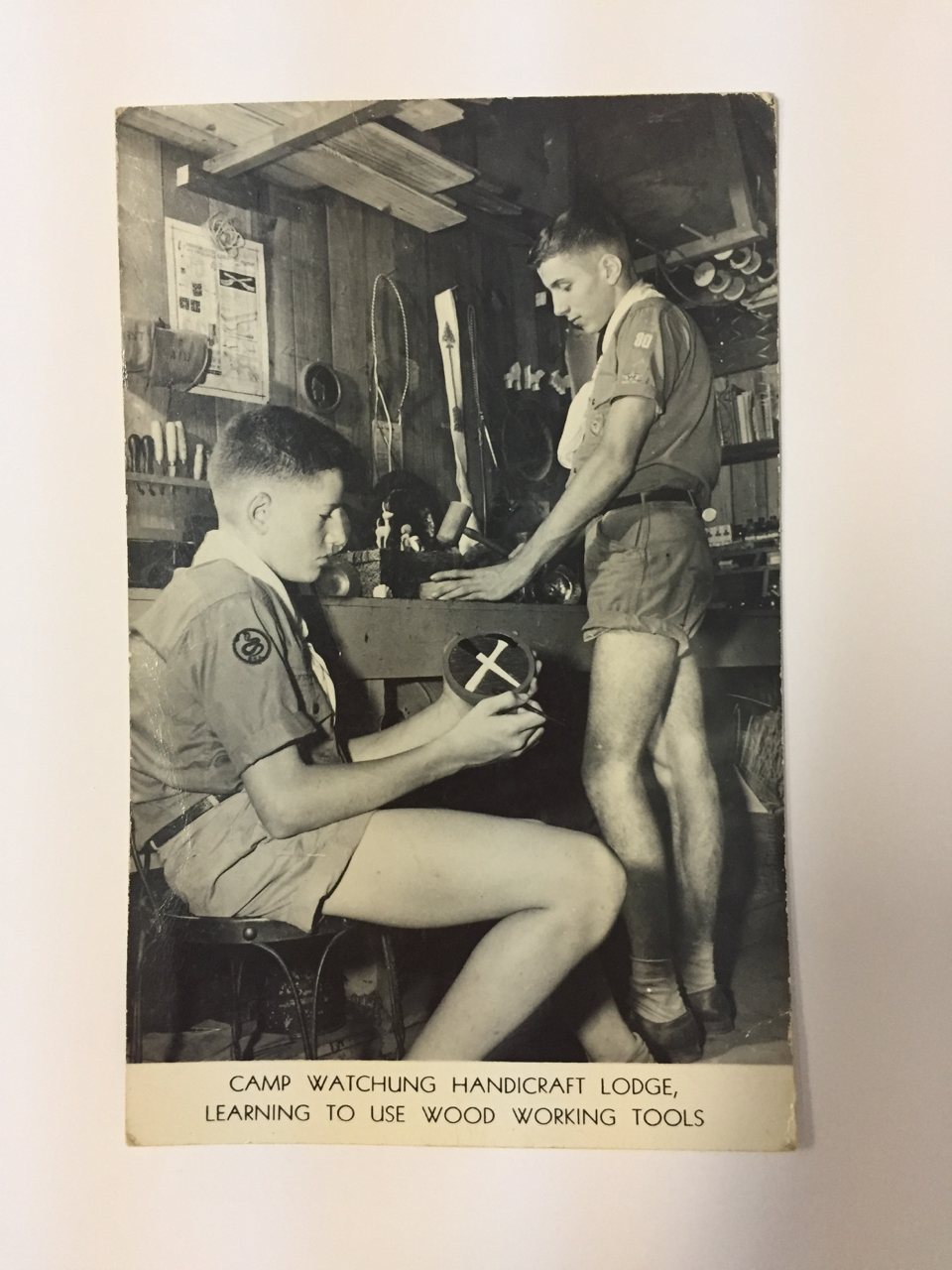
Camp Watchung Handicraft Lodge

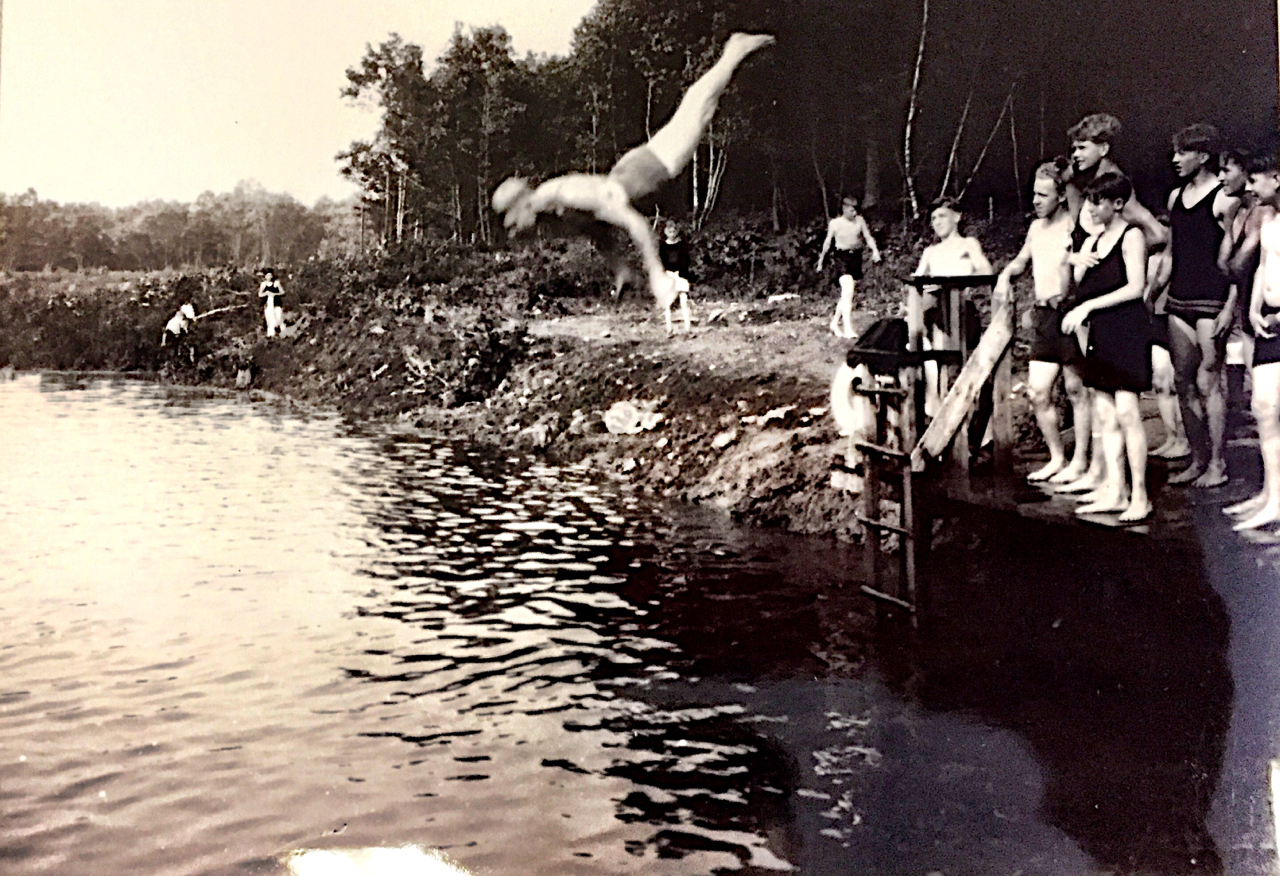
Dangerous Dive at Craig Pond 1928,

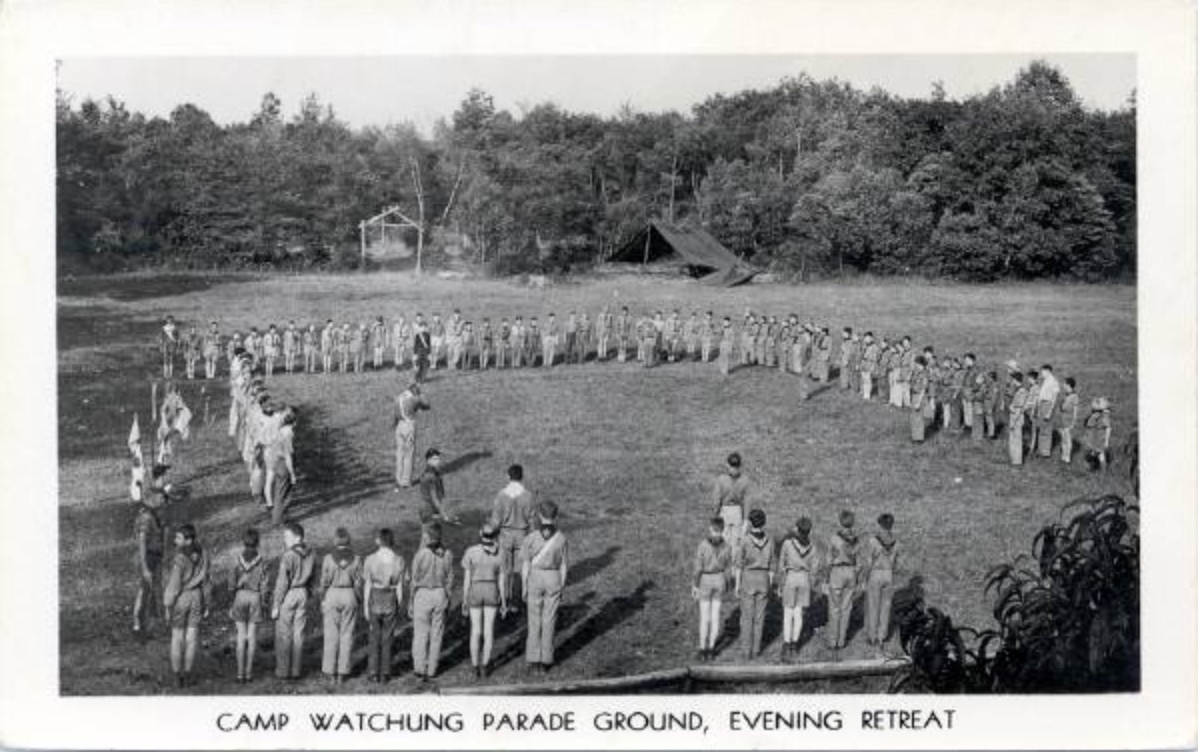
Camp Watchung Parade Grounds

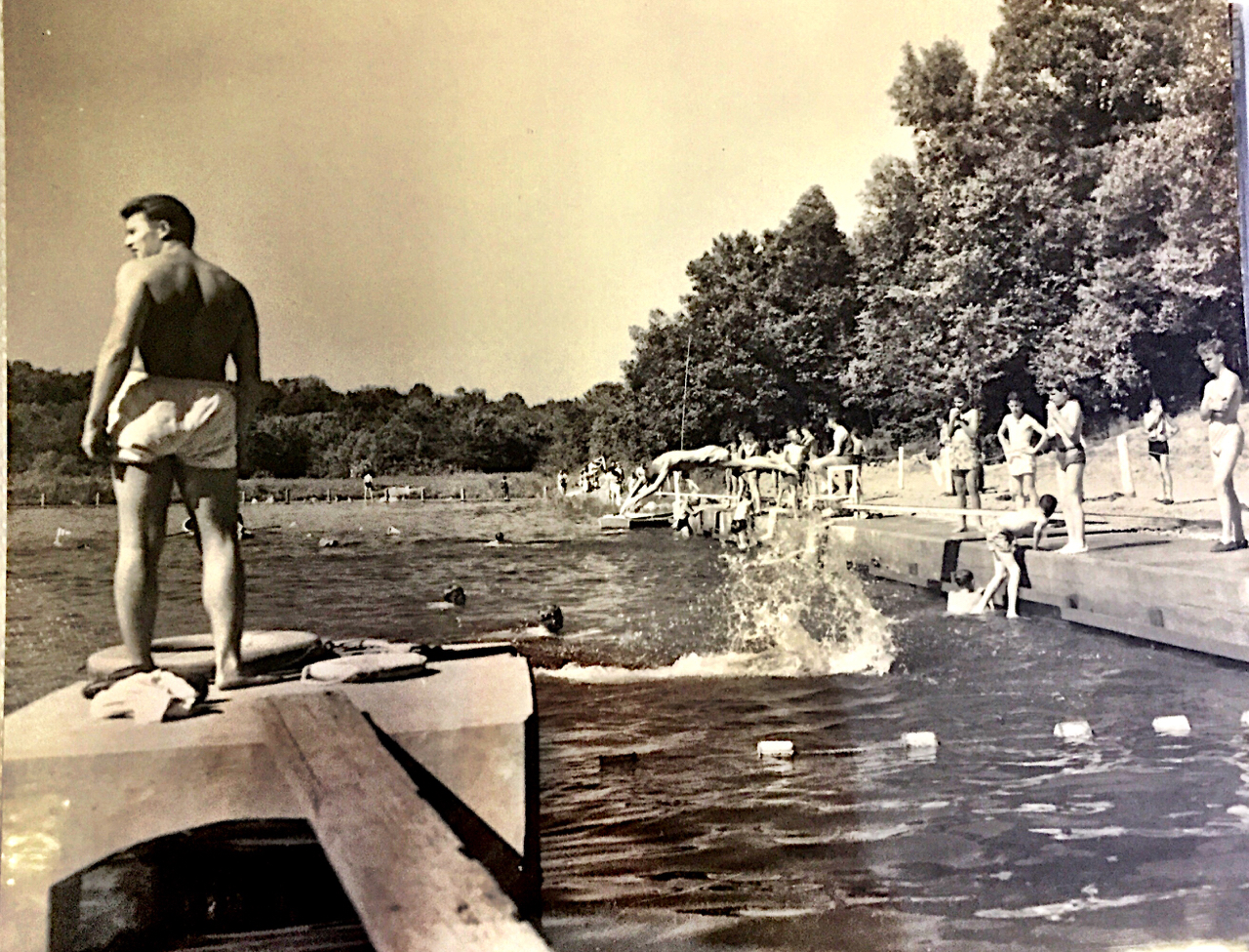
Craig Pond, July 1946

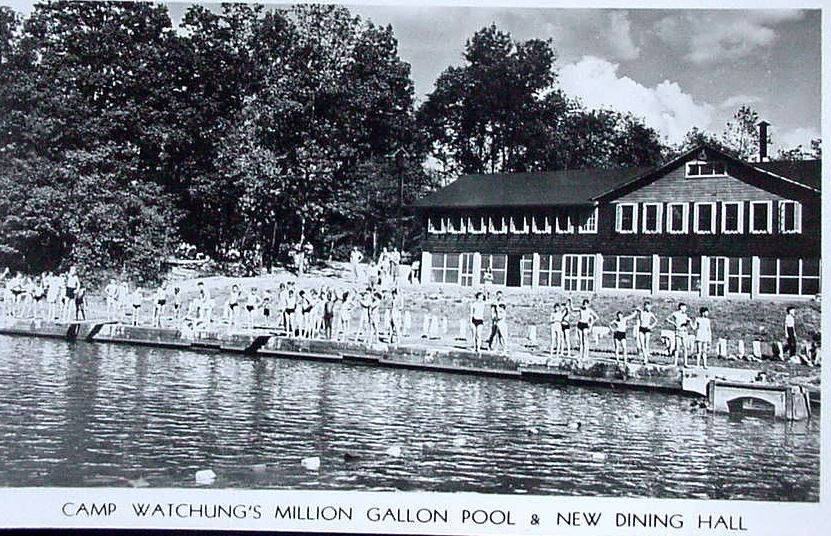
The 128', Million Gallon Pool

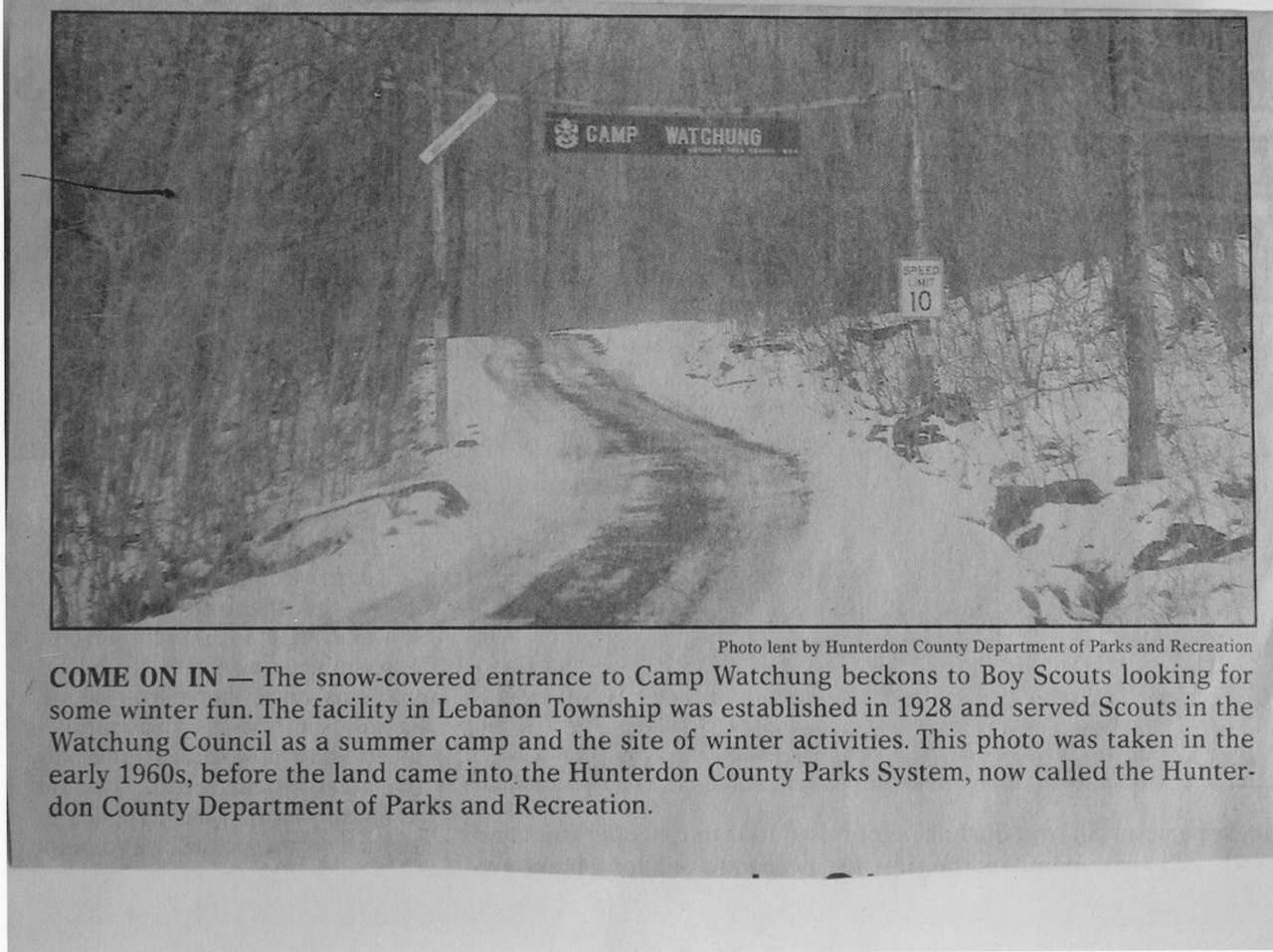
Entrance to Camp Watchung

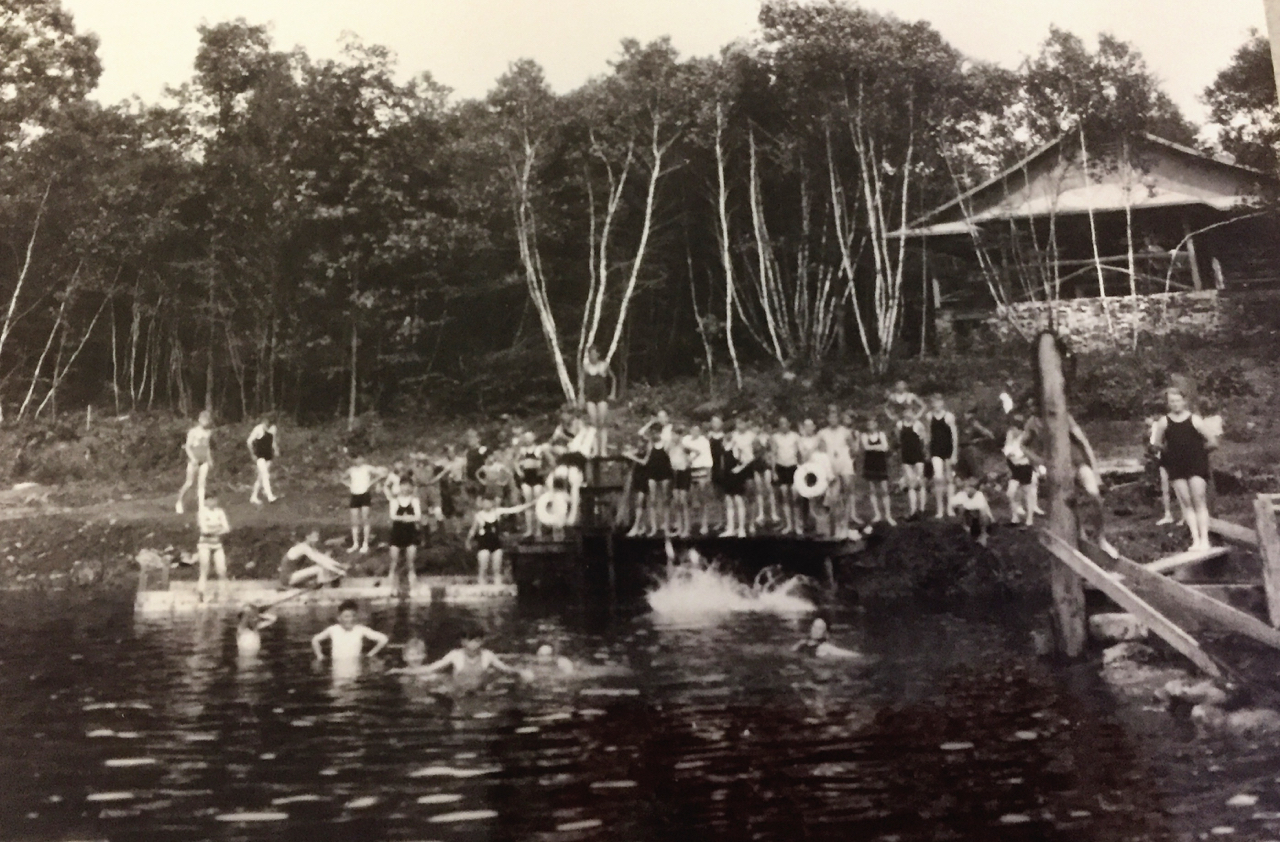
Boy Scouts Enjoying Craig Pond
