= List of defunct councils (Boy Scouts of America) =

List of defunct councils of the Boy Scouts of America

Defunct local councils of the Boy Scouts of America
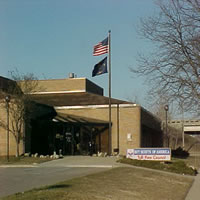
- Tall Pine Council Service Center

Many local councils have gone through countless name changes, merges, splits and re-creations since the establishment of the Boy Scouts of America in 1910.

== List of defunct local councils of the Boy Scouts of America ==
No	Council	City	State	Founded	Defunct	Remarks	New council
618	Allohak Council	Parkersburg	West Virginia	1990	2018	Merged into Buckskin Council 617	Buckskin Council 617
602	3rd Congressional District Council	Richmond	Virginia	1924	1927	Merged into Richmond Area Council 602	
728	4th Congressional District Council	Petersburg	Virginia	1926	1926	Merged into Robert E. Lee Council 728	
703	Aberdeen Area Council	Aberdeen	South Dakota	1925	1928	Renamed Northern South Dakota Council 703 |	
561	Abilene Council	Abilene	Texas	1922	1926	Renamed Chisholm Trail Council 561	
121	Acis Council	Acis	Illinois	1927	1929		Decatur Area 121
740	Adair County Council	Kirksville	Missouri	1926	1928		Pershing 740
141	Adams County Council	Quincy	Illinois	1926	1927		Quincy Area 141
394	Adirondack Council	Plattsburgh	New York	1924	2005	Merged into Twin Rivers 364	Twin Rivers 364
518	Admiral Robert E. Peary Council	Johnstown	Pennsylvania	1936	1970	Merged with Blair-Bedford Area Council 496 and William Penn Council 517	Penn's Woods Council 508
569	Adobe Walls Area Council	Pampa	Texas	1934	1986	Merged with Llano Estacado 562	Golden Spread 562
569	Adobe Walls Council	Pampa	Texas	1928	1934		Adobe Walls Area 569
354	Aheka Council	Passaic	New Jersey	1939	1972	Merged with Alhtaha 355	Passaic Valley 353
433	Akron Area Council	Akron	Ohio	1921	1971	Name changed	Great Trail 433
22	Alameda Council	Alameda	California	1917	2020	Merged with San Francisco Bay Area Council 028	Golden Gate Area Council 028
583	Alamo Area Council	San Antonio	Texas	1912	1918		San Antonio 583
98	Alapaha Area Council	Valdosta	Georgia	1960	2012	Merged with Chehaw 97	South Georgia 98
610	Alaska Council	Juneau	Alaska	1934	1954		Western Alaska 610
610	Alaska Council		Alaska	1930	1934		Alaska 610, Seattle Council 609
364	Albany Council	Albany	New York	1916	1923		Fort Orange 364
282	Albert Lea Council	Albert Lea	Minnesota	1921	1926		Southern Minnesota Area 282
	Albion Council	Albion	Indiana	1917	1918		
412	Albuquerque Council	Albuquerque	New Mexico	1918	1926		Bernalillo County 412
351	Alexander Hamilton Council	Union City	New Jersey	1937	1968	Merged with Hudson 342	Hudson-Hamilton 348
208	Alexandria Council	Alexandria	Louisiana	1919	1921		Attakapas 208
78	Alfred W Dater Council	Glenbrook	Connecticut	1939	1972	Merged with Mauwehu 75 and Pomperaug 65	Fairfield County 68
241	Algonquin Council	Framingham	Massachusetts	1925	1996	Merged with Norumbega 246	Knox Trail 244
355	Alhtaha Council	Wayne	New Jersey	1942	1972	Merged with Aheka 354	Passaic Valley 353
527	Allegheny Council	Pittsburgh	Pennsylvania	1921	1967	Merged with Nemacolin Trails 720	Allegheny Trails 527
	Allegheny County Council	Pittsburgh	Pennsylvania	1914	1920	Divided into seven councils 1921	
527	Allegheny County, West Council	Pittsburgh	Pennsylvania	1928	1943		Allegheny 527
527	Allegheny Trails Council	Pittsburgh	Pennsylvania	1967	1993	Merged with East Valley Area 530	Greater Pittsburgh 527
495	Allegheny Valley Council	Pittsburgh	Pennsylvania	1921	1924	From Allegheny County 1921	
157	Allen County Council	Fort Wayne	Indiana	1924	1925		Anthony Wayne Area 157
729	Allentown Council	Allentown	Pennsylvania	1926	1930		Lehigh County 729
434	Alliance Council	Alliance	Ohio	1923	1928		Canton Area 436
112	Alton Council	Alton	Illinois	1920	1922		Alton-Wood River 112
112	Alton-Wood River Council	Alton	Illinois	1922	1930		Piasa Bird 112
496	Altoona Council	Altoona	Pennsylvania	1919	1929	Merged with Tyrone 535	Blair-Bedford 496
562	Amarillo Area Council	Amarillo	Texas	1928	1939		Llano Estacado 652
562	Amarillo Council	Amarillo	Texas	1921	1924		Panhandle Area 562
116	Ambraw-Wabash Council	Decatur	Illinois	1928	1953		Buffalo Trace 116
169	Ames Council	Ames	Iowa	1914	1923		Story County 169
	Amherst Council	Amherst	Massachusetts	1919	1920		
365	Amsterdam Council	Amsterdam	New York	1919	1925	ended/dissolved/disbanded^{[b]}	
149	Anderson Council	Anderson	Indiana	1923	1928		Hoosier 149
	Anderson Council	Anderson	Indiana	1918	1919		
	Andover Council	Andover	Massachusetts	1917	1918		
730	Andrew Jackson Council	Florence	Alabama	1926	1930	Merged into Tennessee Valley 659	Tennessee Valley 659
255	Ann Arbor Council	Ann Arbor	Michigan	1917	1924	Merged with Ypsilanti 281	Washtenaw County 255
225	Annawon Council	Norton	Massachusetts	1930	2016	Merged with Narragansett 546	Narragansett 546
514	Anthracite Council	Hazleton	Pennsylvania	1927	1970	Merged with Wyoming Valley 542	Penn Mountains 522
7	Apache Council	Miami	Arizona	1922	1934		Roosevelt 10
559	Appalachian Council	Johnson City	Tennessee	1925	1925		Cherokee Area 559
673	Appalachian Council	Beckley	West Virginia	1946	1955		Appalachian 707
707	Appalachian Council	Bluefield	Virginia	1956	1991	Merged into Buckskin 617	Buckskin 617
526	Appalachian Trail Council	Pottsville	Pennsylvania	1941	1970	Merged with Daniel Boone 528	Hawk Mountain 528
	Appleton Council	Appleton	Wisconsin	1920	1922	Merged with Neenah-Menasha	Valley 635
468	Ardmore Council	Ardmore	Oklahoma	1918	1925	Merged with Garvin and Mcclain Area 475	Red River Area 468
187	Arkansas City Council	Arkansas City	Kansas	1920	1924	Merged with Winfield 199	Sumner-Crowley 199
669	Arkansas Valley Council	La Junta	Colorado	1924	1927	Merged with Las Animas County 64	Spanish Peaks 064
223	Arlington Council	Arlington	Massachusetts	1922	1926		Sachem 223
48	Arrowhead Area Council	San Bernardino	California	1933	1972	Merged with Riverside County 45	California Inland Empire 45
117	Arrowhead Council	Champaign	Illinois	1933	1991	Merged with Piankeshaw 739	Illiana 117
298	Arrowhead Council	Virginia	Minnesota	1925	1928	Merged with Eveleth 287	Iron Range 298
563	Arrowhead Council	San Marcos	Texas	1924	1928	ended/dissolved/disbanded^{[b]}	583 and 564
703	Arrowhead Council	Waterton	South Dakota	1934	1943		Pheasant 693
414	Asheville Council	Asheville	North Carolina	1919	1922		Buncombe County 414
200	Ashland Council	Ashland	Kentucky	1918	1928		Huntington 672
	Ashland Council	Ashland	Wisconsin	1918	1920		
435	Ashtabula Council	Ashtabula	Ohio	1922	1926	ended/dissolved/disbanded^{[b]}	
	Ashton Council	Ashton	Idaho	1917	1918		
489	Astoria Council	Astoria	Oregon	1922	1923		Clatsop County 489
92	Atlanta Council	Atlanta	Georgia	1915	1939		Atlanta Area 92
331	Atlantic Area Council	Northfield	New Jersey	1926	1992	Merged with Ocean County 341	Ocean County 341 and Jersey Shore 341
331	Atlantic City Council	Atlantic City	New Jersey	1918	1926		Atlantic Area 331
208	Attakapas Council	Alexandria	Louisiana	1921	1923		Rapids Parish 208
208	Attakapas Council	Alexandria	Louisiana	1925	1933	ended/dissolved/disbanded^{[b]}	
208	Attakapas Council	Alexandria	Louisiana	1938	2003	Merged with Ouachita Valley 213	Louisiana Purchase 213
366	Auburn Council	Auburn	New York	1919	1924		Cayuga County 366
	Auburn Council	Auburn	Maine	1917	1919		
200	Audubon Council	Owensboro	Kentucky	1952	1994	Merged with Four Rivers 207	Shawnee Trails 200
93	Augusta Area Council	Augusta	Georgia	1929	1941		Georgia-Carolina 93
93	Augusta Council	Augusta	Georgia	1920	1925		Richmond County 93
	Aumuckalie Council	3rd Congressional District	Georgia	1921	1922		
113	Aurora Area Council	Aurora	Illinois	1927	1955	Name changed	Kedeka Area 113
113	Aurora Council	Aurora	Illinois	1916	1927		Aurora Area 113
564	Austin Area Council	Austin	Texas	1928	1934		Capital Area 564
283	Austin Council	Austin	Minnesota	1921	1929		Cedar Valley Area 283
564	Austin Council	Austin	Texas	1912	1924		Austin-Travis County 564
564	Austin-Travis County Council	Austin	Texas	1924	1928		Austin Area 564
700	Aztec Council	Laredo	Texas	1927	1933		577 and 583
381	Baden-Powell Council	Binghamton	New York	1975	1998	Merged with Susquenango 368	Baden-Powell 368
622	Badger Council	Fond du Lac	Wisconsin	1926	1973	Merged with Waumegesako 625, Nicolet Area 621, Valley 635, Twin Lakes 630 and Kettle Moraine 632	Bay Lakes 635
30	Bakersfield Council	Bakersfield	California	1919	1921		Kern County 30
220	Baltimore Council	Baltimore	Maryland	1915	1924		Baltimore County 220
220	Baltimore County Council	Baltimore	Maryland	1924	1925		Baltimore Area 220
216	Bangor Council	Bangor	Maine	1919	1924		Penobscot 216
	Barnesville Council	Barnesville	Ohio	1917	1918		
224	Barnstable County Council	Barnstable	Massachusetts	1915	1925		Cape Cod 224
150	Bartholomew County Council	Columbus	Indiana	1921	1926		
469	Bartlesville Council	Bartlesville	Oklahoma	1917	1925		Cherokee Area 469
367	Batavia Council	Batavia	New York	1917	1924		Genesee and Wyoming Counties 367
	Bath Council	Bath	Maine	1917	1919		
211	Baton Rouge Council	Baton Rouge	Louisiana	1917	1922		East Baton Rouge Parish 211
256	Battle Creek Area Council	Battle Creek	Michigan	1927	1953		Nottawa Trails 256
256	Battle Creek Council	Battle Creek	Michigan	1915	1927		Battle Creek Area 256
257	Bay City Council (Michigan)	Bay City	Michigan	1917	1926	Merged with Midland 273	Summer Trails 257
	Bay City Council (Texas)	Bay City	Texas	1918	1920		
239	Bay Shore Council	Lynn	Massachusetts	1936	1966	Merged with North Shore 701	North Bay 236
332	Bayonne Council	Bayonne	New Jersey	1918	1993	Merged into Hudson-Hamilton 348	Hudson-Hamilton 348
	Beacon Council	Beacon	New York	1917	1918		
249	Bear Hill Council	Stoneham	Massachusetts	1924	1926		Medford 242
565	Beaumont Area Council	Beaumont	Texas	1934	1942		Trinity-Neches 565
565	Beaumont Council	Beaumont	Texas	1919	1934		Beaumont Area 565
497	Beaver County Council	Rochester	Pennsylvania	1915	1926		
	Bedford Council	Bedford	Ohio	1917	1918		
114	Belleville Area Council	Belleville	Illinois	1933	1936		Kaskaskia 114
114	Belleville Council	Belleville	Illinois	1917	1933		Belleville Area 114
603	Bellingham Council	Bellingham	Washington	1918	1926	Name changed	Whatcom County 603
	Bellville Council	Bellville	New Jersey	1918	1918		
225	Belmont Council	Belmont	Massachusetts	1919	1925		Arlington 223
620	Beloit Area Council	Beloit	Wisconsin	1929	1936		State Line 620
620	Beloit Council	Beloit	Wisconsin	1920	1929		Beloit Area 620
412	Bemalillo County Council	Albuquerque	New Mexico	1926	1927		Rio Grand Area 412
651	Bend Council	Bend	Oregon	1924	1925		Central Oregon 651
490	Benlinncoln Council	Corvallis	Oregon	1927	1931		Lane County 493 and Cascade Area 697
258	Benton Harbor & St. Joseph Council	Saint Joseph	Michigan	1923	1929		Berrien-Cass Area 258
	Berea Council	Berea	Ohio	1918	1921		
350	Bergen Council	Fair Lawn	New Jersey	1969	1998	Merged with Essex 336, Hudson Liberty 348 and Passaic Valley 353	Northern New Jersey
23	Berkeley Council	Berkeley	California	1913	1932	Merged with Contra Costa 24	Berkeley Contra-Costa County 23
23	Berkeley-Contra Costa County Council	Berkeley	California	1932	1951		Mount Diablo 23
528	Berks County Council	Reading	Pennsylvania	1921	1928		Reading-Berks County 528
226	Berkshire Council	Pittsfield	Massachusetts	1955	1969	Merged with Hampshire Franklin 235	Great Trails 243
226	Berkshire County Council	Pittsfield	Massachusetts	1923	1955		Berkshire 226
	Bernardsville Council	Bernardsville	New Jersey	1919	1921		
258	Berrien County Council	Saint Joseph	Michigan	1919	1923		Benton Harbor and St Joseph 258
258	Berrien-Cass Area Council	Saint Joseph	Michigan	1929	1941		Southwestern Michigan 258
504	Berwick Council	Berwick	Pennsylvania	1920	1924		Columbia County and Montour County 504
498	Bethlehem Area Council	Bethlehem	Pennsylvania	1941	1968	Merged with Lehigh County 729 and Delaware Valley Area 510	Minsi Trails 502
498	Bethlehem Council	Bethlehem	Pennsylvania	1917	1941		Bethlehem Area 498
	Beverly Council	Beverly	Massachusetts	1917	1919		
217	Biddeford & Saco Council	Saco	Maine	1921	1924	ended/dissolved/disbanded^{[b]}	
368	Binghamton Council	Binghamton	New York	1918	1920		
368	Binghamton Council	Binghamton	New York	1922	1925		Susquenango 368
2	Birmingham Area Council	Birmingham	Alabama	1915	1996	Name changed	Central Alabama 2
432	Bismarck Area Council	Bismarck	North Dakota	1927	1929		Missouri Valley 432
472	Black Beaver Area Council	Lawton	Oklahoma	1925	1927		Navajo Mountain Area 476
471	Black Beaver Council	Lawton	Oklahoma	1930	1996		Last Frontier 480
530	Black Diamond Area Council	Shamokin	Pennsylvania	1935	1936		Susquehanna Valley 533
706	Blackhawk Area Council	Dixon/Sterling	Illinois	1925	1927		Rockford Council 660
496	Blair-Bedford Area Council	Altoona	Pennsylvania	1929	1970	Merged with William Penn 517 and Admiral Peary 518	Penn's Woods 508
333	Bloomfield Council	Bloomfield	New Jersey	1917	1929	Merged with Nutley 352	Bloomfield-Nutley 333
333	Bloomfield-Nutley Council	Rutherford	New Jersey	1929	1935		Tamarack 333
115	Bloomington & Normal Council	Bloomington	Illinois	1922	1925		Corn Belt 115
115	Bloomington Council	Bloomington	Illinois	1920	1922		Bloomington and Normal 115
600	Blue Ridge Council	Roanoke	Virginia	1953	1972	Merged with Piedmont Area 594	Blue Ridge Mountains 599
277	Blue Water Council	Port Huron	Michigan	1939	2012	Merged with Tall Pine 264, Lake Huron Area 265 and Chief Okemos 271	Water and Wood Field Service Council 782
	Blytheville Council	Blytheville	Arkansas	1916	1917		
105	Boise Area Council	Boise	Idaho	1927	1951		Mountainview 105
105	Boise Council	Boise	Idaho	1919	1927		Boise Area 105
106	Bonner-Boundary Council	Sandpoint	Idaho	1922	1926		Shoshone-Kooten 110
152	Boone County Council	Lebanon	Indiana	1927	1929		Indianapolis 160
170	Boone County Council	Boone	Iowa	1924	1926		Story County 169
227	Boston Council	Boston	Massachusetts	1921	1980	Name changed	Greater Boston 227
227	Boston Minuteman Council	Milton	Massachusetts	1993	2015	Merged with Yankee Clipper 236	Spirit Of Adventure
	Boulder Council	Boulder	Colorado	1917	1920		
328	Boulder Dam Area Council	Las Vegas	Nevada	1944	2005	Name changed to Las Vegas Area 328	
	Bound Brook Council	Bound Brook	New Jersey	1917	1918		
	Bowling Green Council	Bowling Green	Ohio	1917	1918		
	Boy Scout Federation of GNY Council	New York City	New York	1925	1936		Greater New York 719
	Bradford Council	Bradford	Pennsylvania	1917	1921		
	Brattleboro Council	Brattleboro	Vermont	1916	1921		
566	Brazos Valley Council	Bryan	Texas	1924	1926	ended/dissolved/disbanded^{[b]}	
	Bremerton Council	Bremerton	Washington	1917	1919		
65	Bridgeport Council	Bridgeport	Connecticut	1915	1936		Pomperaug 65
	Bridgewater Council	Bridgewater	Massachusetts	1917	1919		
66	Bristol Council	Bristol	Connecticut	1917	1967	Merged with Keemosahbee 73	Nathan Hale 72
	Bristol Council	Bristol	Pennsylvania	1917	1918		
470	Bristow Council	Bristow	Oklahoma	1923	1925		Okmulgee 481
	Brockport Council	Brockport	New York	1917	1918		
228	Brockton Council	Brockton	Massachusetts	1919	1936		Squanto 228
372	Bronx Council	New York	New York	1915	1967	Name changed	Greater New York, Bronx 641
370	Bronx Valley Council	Mount Vernon	New York	1923	1958	Merged with Siwanoy 401	Siwanoy-Bronx Valley 401
	Bronxville Council	Bronxville	New York	1919	1923	Merged with Mount Vernon 370	Bronx Valley 370
369	Brooklyn Council	Brooklyn	New York	1911	1967	Name changed	Greater New York, Brooklyn 642
	Brookville Council	Brookville	Pennsylvania	1917	1918		
91	Broward County Council	Fort Lauderdale	Florida	1927	1933		Dade County 84
479	Brownwood Council	Brownwood	Texas	1927	1928		Pecan Valley 479
	Brownwood Council	Brownwood	Texas	1921	1924		
671	Bryce Canyon Council	Ephraim	Utah	1924	1936	Merged with Timpanagos Area 591	Utah National Parks 591
802	BSA Philippine Islands Council	Manila	Philippine Islands	1938	1942	ended/dissolved/disbanded^{[b]}	
462	Buckeye Area Council	Massillon	Ohio	1953	1958	Merged with McKinley Area 436	Buckeye 436
	Bucks & Chester Counties Council	West Chester	Pennsylvania	1918	1918		Chester County 539
	Bucks County Council	Doylestown	Pennsylvania	1927	2015	renamed	Washington Crossing Council 777
	Bucyrus Council	Bucyrus	Ohio	1918	1920		
380	Buffalo Area Council	Buffalo	New York	1949	1967	Merged with Niagara Frontier 387	Greater Niagara Frontier 380
176	Buffalo Bill Area Council	Davenport	Iowa	1929	1967	Merged with Sac-Fox 134	Illowa 133
373	Buffalo Council	Buffalo	New York	1912	1949	Merged with Erie County 376	Buffalo Area 380
322	Buffalo County Council	Kearney	Nebraska	1922	1923		Kearney 322
116	Buffalo Trace Council	Mount Vernon	Illinois	1953	1955	Divided into Kaskaskia 114, 121, Southern Indiana 156, 166	Kaskaskia 114, 121, Southern Indiana 156, 166
171	Burlington Council	Burlington	Iowa	1917	1929		Southeast Iowa 171
592	Burlington Council	Burlington	Vermont	1920	1926		Champlain 592
	Burlington Council	Burlington	Vermont	1910	1919		
	Burlington Council	Burlington	New Jersey	1919	1924		
690	Burlington County Council	Rancocas	New Jersey	1925	2013	Merged with Southern New Jersey	Garden State
	Butler Council	Butler	Pennsylvania	1917	1919		
448	Butler County Council	Hamilton	Ohio	1925	1935		Fort Hamilton 448
500	Butler County Council	Butler	Pennsylvania	1923	1929		Butler-Armstrong Area 500
500	Butler-Armstrong Area Council	Butler	Pennsylvania	1929	1949		Pioneer Trails 500
313	Butte City Council	Butte	Montana	1918	1927		Silver Bow 313
47	Buttes Area Council	Marysville	California	1924	1992	Merged with Mount Lassen Area	Golden Empire 47
475	Ca-Bla-Ki Council	El Reno	Oklahoma	1927	1928	Merged with Oklahoma City 480	Oklahoma County 480
245	Cachalot Council	New Bedford	Massachusetts	1935	1971	Merged with Massasoit 233	Moby Dick 245
588	Cache Valley Area Council	Logan	Utah	1924	1993	Merged with Jim Bridger 639 and Lake Bonneville 589	Lake Bonneville 589 and Trapper Trails 589
588	Cache Valley Council	Logan	Utah	1922	1924		Cache Valley Area 588
128	Cahokia Mound Council	Granite City	Illinois	1925	1991	Merged with Piasa Bird 112	Trails West 112
116	Cairo Council	Cairo	Illinois	1920	1927	Discontinued	
209	Calcasieu and Cameron Parishes Council	Lake Charles	Louisiana	1925	1930		Calcasieu Area 209
209	Calcasieu Parish Council	Lake Charles	Louisiana	1919	1920		Lake Charles 209
209	Calcasieu Parish Council	Lake Charles	Louisiana	1922	1925		Calcasieu and Cameron Parishes 209
334	Caldwell Council	Caldwell	New Jersey	1918	1929	Number changed to (820)	
820	Caldwell Council	Caldwell	New Jersey	1929	1931	Merged with Glen Ridge 821	Montclair 346
	Calumet Council (Michigan)	Calumet	Michigan	1915	1918		
152	Calumet Council	Munster	Indiana	1966	2014	Merged with Chicago Area Council, Des Plaines Valley Council, Northwest Suburban Council	Pathway to Adventure Council
747	Calvin Coolidge Council	Bellows Falls	Vermont	1936	1965	Merged with Green Mountain	Ethan Allen 593
229	Cambridge Council	Cambridge	Massachusetts	1919	2000	Merged into Boston Minuteman 227	Boston Minuteman 227
335	Camden Council	Camden	New Jersey	1915	1921		Camden County 335
335	Camden County Council	West Collingswood	New Jersey	1921	1998		Southern New Jersey 334
	Cameys Point Council	Cameys Point	New Jersey	1917	1919		
485	Canadian Valley Council	Shawnee	Oklahoma	1927	1947		Last Frontier 480
801	Canal Zone Council	Balboa	CZ	1933	1979	Name changed	Panama Canal 801
641	Canal Zone, Panama Council	Balboa	CZ	1923	1929		Panama Canal Zone 801
436	Canton Area Council	Canton	Ohio	1927	1932		McKinley Area 436
436	Canton Council	Canton	Ohio	1918	1923		Central Stark County 436
224	Cape Cod & Islands Council	Hyannis	Massachusetts	1981	1995	Name changed	Cape Cod and the Islands 224
224	Cape Cod Council	Hyannis	Massachusetts	1925	1981		Cape Cod and Islands 224
425	Cape Fear Area Council	Wilmington	North Carolina	1930	1989		Cape Fear 425
	Cape Girardeau Council	Cape Girardeau	Missouri	1917	1919		
501	Carlisle Council	Carlisle	Pennsylvania	1917	1919	ended/dissolved/disbanded^{[b]}	
501	Carlisle Council	Carlisle	Pennsylvania	1922	1929		Harrisburg Area 515
	Carlsbad Council	Carlsbad	New Mexico	1920	1923	Merged with Roswell 413	Pecos Valley 413
	Carthage Council	Carthage	Missouri	1919	1921		
493	Cascade Area Council	Salem	Oregon	1926	1993	Merged with Columbia Pacific 492	Cascade Pacific 492
638	Casper Area Council	Casper	Wyoming	1925	1929		Central Wyoming 638
638	Casper Council	Casper	Wyoming	1917	1918		
638	Casper Council	Casper	Wyoming	1920	1925		Casper Area 638
	Cass Lake Council	Cass Lake	Minnesota	1917	1918		
415	Catawba River Council	Hickory	North Carolina	1923	1927	ended/dissolved/disbanded^{[b]}	
750	Cattaraugus Council	Olean	New York	1926	1929	Name changed	Seneca 750
366	Cayuga County Council	Auburn	New York	1924	2009	Charter Not Renewed	
	Cedar Falls Council	Cedar Falls	Iowa	1922	1924		
172	Cedar Rapids Area Council	Cedar Rapids	Iowa	1928	1941		Waubeck Area 172
	Cedar Rapids Council	Cedar Rapids	Iowa	1916	1919	ended/dissolved/disbanded^{[b]}	
282	Cedar Valley Area Council	Albert Lea	Minnesota	1937	1969	Merged with Minnesota Valley Area 284	Twin Valley 284
283	Cedar Valley Area Council	Austin	Minnesota	1929	1937	Merged with Southern Minnesota Area 282	Cedar Valley Area 282
	Centerville Council	Centerville	South Dakota	1917	1918		
708	Centinela Council	Inglewood	California	1925	1927		Los Angeles 33
2	Central Alabama Council	Birmingham	Alabama	1996	1998	Merged with Choccolocco 1 and Tennessee Valley 659	Greater Alabama 1
764	Central Alabama Council	Opelika	Alabama	1927	1934		Georgia-Alabama 91
25	Central Coast Counties Council	San Luis Obispo	California	1922	1924		Santa Barbara 53
71	Central Connecticut Council	Meriden	Connecticut	1929	1978		Quinnipiac 074
653	Central District Council	Columbia	Missouri	1924	1925		Central Missouri Area 653
75	Central Fairfield Council	Norwalk	Connecticut	1932	1935		Mid-Fairfield 075
	Central Hudson Council	Union Hill	New Jersey	1919	1921		
160	Central Indiana Council	Indianapolis	Indiana	1942	1972	Merged with Delaware County 679, Kikthawenund Area 149 and Whitewater Valley 151	Crossroads of America 160
658	Central Iowa Council	Marshalltown	Iowa	1925	1942	Merged with Tri-Valley 778, Des Moines Area 177 and Tall Corn Area 169	Tall Corn Area 177
653	Central Missouri Area Council	Columbia	Missouri	1925	1951		Great Rivers 653
318	Central Montana Council	Lewiston	Montana	1922	1924	ended/dissolved/disbanded^{[b]}	
352	Central New Jersey Council	Dayton	New Jersey	1999	2014	dissolved	
441	Central Ohio Council	Columbus	Ohio	1930	1994	Merged with Scioto 457 and Chief Logan 464	Simon Kenton 441
480	Central Oklahoma Council	Oklahoma City	Oklahoma	1930	1939		Last Frontier 480
651	Central Oregon Council	Bend	Oregon	1925	1927		Mid-Columbia 494
482	Central Plains Council	Plainview	Texas	1928	1932		Direct Service
553	Central South Carolina Council	Columbia	South Carolina	1929	1978	Name changed	Indian Waters 553
693	Central South Dakota Council	Huron	South Dakota	1928	1942		Pheasant 693
436	Central Stark County Council	Canton	Ohio	1923	1927		Canton Area 436
	Central Union Council	Fanwood	New Jersey	1919	1922		Plainfield 358
614	Central Washington Area Council	Yakima	Washington	1942	1954		Fort Simcoe Area 614
616	Central West Virginia Council	Clarksburg	West Virginia	1941	1990	Merged with Kootaga 618	Allohak 618
636	Central Wisconsin Council	Wisconsin Rapids	Wisconsin	1929	1933		
173	Cerro Gordo County Council	Mason City	Iowa	1922	1928		North Iowa 173
	Chambersburg Council	Chambersburg	Pennsylvania	1922	1923		
649	Chamorro Council	Agana	Guam	1970	1973		Aloha 104
117	Champaign County Council	Champaign	Illinois	1918	1923		Champaign-Urbana 117
117	Champaign-Urbana Council	Champaign	Illinois	1923	1933		Arrowhead 117
592	Champlain Council	Burlington	Vermont	1926	1929	ended/dissolved/disbanded^{[b]}	Long Trail 592
395	Champlain Valley Council	Plattsburgh	New York	1926	1931		Adirondack 394
	Charles City Council	Charles City	Iowa	1918	1920		
617	Charleston Area Council	Charleston	West Virginia	1929	1949		Buckskin 617
617	Charleston Council	Charleston	West Virginia	1919	1929		Charleston Area 617
550	Charleston County Council	Charleston	South Carolina	1921	1941		Coastal Carolina 550
415	Charlotte Council	Charlotte	North Carolina	1940	1942		Mecklenburg County 415
416	Charlotte Council	Charlotte	North Carolina	1915	1937		Central North Carolina 416
70	Charter Oak Council	Hartford	Connecticut	1933	1972	Merged with Middlesex County, Mattatuck, Nathan Hale and Tunxis	Long Rivers 66
	Chartiers Council	McKees Rocks	Pennsylvania	1921	1922	From Allegheny County 1921	
99	Chatham County Council	Savannah	Georgia	1923	1942		Coastal Empire 99
94	Chattahoochee Council	West Point	Georgia	1923	1950		George H. Lanier 94
556	Chattanooga Area Council	Chattanooga	Tennessee	1925	1944		Cherokee Area 556
556	Chattanooga Council	Chattanooga	Tennessee	1918	1925		Chattanooga Area 556
382	Chautauqua County Council	Jamestown	New York	1925	1932		Chautauqua Lake Area 382
382	Chautauqua County Council	Mayville	New York	1941	1973	Merged with Elk Lick 499	Allegheny Highlands 382
382	Chautauqua Lake Area Council	Jamestown	New York	1932	1941	Merged with Lake Shore 407	Chautauqua County 382
	Chehalis Council	Chehalis	Washington	1921	1923		
97	Chehaw Council	Albany	Georgia	2005	2012	Merged with Alapaha Area 098	South Georgia 098
97	Chehaw Council	Albany	Georgia	1939	1984	Name changed	Southwest Georgia 97
727	Chelsea Council	Chelsea	Massachusetts	1926	1927		Inter-City 727
	Chelsea Council	Chelsea	Massachusetts	1918	1920		
375	Chemung County Council	Elmira	New York	1926	1927		Elmira Area 375
559	Cherokee Area Council	Johnson City	Tennessee	1925	1929	Merged with Chief Benge 713	Chief Benge-Cherokee 713
95	Cherokee Council	Rome	Georgia	1923	1923		Floyd County 95
417	Cherokee Council	Burlington	North Carolina	1923	1994		Old North State 70
502	Chester City Council	Chester	Pennsylvania	1918	1933		Delaware and Montgomery Counties 507
639	Cheyenne Council	Cheyenne	Wyoming	1920	1925		Southeastern Wyoming 639
639	Cheyenne Council	Cheyenne	Wyoming	1929	1931		Longs Peak 62
118	Chicago Council	Chicago	Illinois	1910	1930		Chicago Area 118
118	Chicago Area Council	Chicago	Illinois	1930	2014	Merged with Calumet Council, Des Plaines Valley Council, Northwest Suburban Council	Pathway to Adventure Council
119	Chicago Heights Council	Chicago Heights	Illinois	1919	1925		Potawatomi Area 119
468	Chickasaw Council	Ardmore	Oklahoma	1930	1945	Merged with Pontotoc County 484	Arbuckle Area 468
471	Chickasha Council	Chickasha	Oklahoma	1918	1926		Grady County 471
149	Chief Anderson Council	Anderson	Indiana	1931	1935		Kikthawenund Area 149
713	Chief Benge Council	Bristol	Virginia	1925	1929	Merged with Cherokee Area 559	Chief Benge-Cherokee 713
713	Chief Benge-Cherokee Council	Bristol	Virginia	1929	1931		Sequoyah 713
756	Chief Cornstalk Council	Logan	West Virginia	1954	1990		Buckskin 617
464	Chief Logan Council	Chillicothe	Ohio	1944	1994	Merged with Scioto 457 and Central Ohio 441	Simon Kenton Council 441
271	Chief Okemos Council	Lansing	Michigan	1932	2012	Merged with Tall Pine 264, Lake Huron Area 265 and Blue Water 277	Water and Wood Field Service Council 782
207	Chief Paducah Council	Paducah	Kentucky	1925	1940		Four Rivers 207
722	Chief Shabbona Council	Sycamore	Illinois	1927	1931	Merged with Fox Valley 735	Chief Shabbona 735
735	Chief Shabbona Council	St Charles	Illinois	1931	1968	Merged with Kedeka Area 113	Two Rivers 127
437	Chillicothe Council	Chillicothe	Ohio	1921	1927		Columbus 441 1929
621	Chippewa & Eau Claire Co's Council	Eau Claire	Wisconsin	1924	1925		Ojibwa 62 1
259	Chippewa Area Council	Sault Ste. Marie	Michigan	1929	1945	Merged with Copper Country 260, Hiawatha Area 261, Iron Range 649 and Red Buck 263	Hiawathaland 261
259	Chippewa County Council	Sault Ste. Marie	Michigan	1920	1929		Chippewa Area 259
621	Chippewa Falls Council	Chippewa Falls	Wisconsin	1927	1928	ended/dissolved/disbanded^{[b]}	
	Chippewa Falls Council	Chippewa Falls	Wisconsin	1917	1920		
284	Chisholm Council	Chisholm	Minnesota	1921	1925	Merged with Hibbing 290	George Washington 290
561	Chisholm Trail Council	Abilene	Texas	1926	2003	Merged with Commanche Trail 479	Texas Trails 561
1	Choccolocco Council	Anniston	Alabama	1921	1998	Merged with Central Alabama 2 and Tennessee Valley 659	Greater Alabama 1
210	Choctaw Area Council	Deridder/Oakdale	Louisiana	1923	1929		Calcasieu and Cameron Parishes 209
477	Choctaw Area Council	McAlester	Oklahoma	1926	1971		Indian Nations 488
726	Choctawhatchee Council	Dothan	Alabama	1925	1930	ended/dissolved/disbanded^{[b]}	
	Chrisman Council	Chrisman	Illinois	1917	1918		
203	Christian County Council	Hopkinsville	Kentucky	1923	1924		Penny Royal 203
120	Cicero Council	Cicero	Illinois	1922	1933		Chicago Area 118
473	Cimarron Valley Area Council	Cushing	Oklahoma	1922	1948	Merged with North Oklahoma 483	Will Rogers 473
438	Cincinnati Area Council	Cincinnati	Ohio	1915	1956	Merged with Dan Beard 201	Dan Beard 438
699	ClaiBienWeb Council	Minden	Louisiana	1925	1926		Norwela Area 215
	Claremont Council	Claremont	New Hampshire	1916	1918		
537	Clarion and Venango Counties Council	Oil City	Pennsylvania	1925	1942		Colonel Drake 537
	Clark Air Force Base Council	Angeles City	PI	1959	1965		Far East 803
439	Clark County Council	Springfield	Ohio	1923	1929		Tecumseh 439
616	Clarksburg Area Council	Clarksburg	West Virginia	1936	1941		Central West Virginia 616
616	Clarksburg Council	Clarksburg	West Virginia	1916	1936		Clarksburg Area 616
	Clarksville Council	Clarksville	Tennessee	1917	1919		
489	Clatsop County Council	Astoria	Oregon	1923	1927		Portland Area Council 492
	Cleburne Council	Cleburne	Texas	1921	1921		
440	Cleveland Council	Cleveland	Ohio	1915	1929		Greater Cleveland 440
174	Clinton Area Council	Clinton	Iowa	1927	1933	Merged with Dubuque 178	Dubuque Area 178
174	Clinton Area Council	Clinton	Iowa	1936	1937		Mesquakie Area 174
151	Clinton Council	Clinton	Indiana	1922	1924	ended/dissolved/disbanded^{[b]}	
174	Clinton Council	Clinton	Iowa	1918	1927		Clinton Area 174
503	Clinton County Council	Lockhaven	Pennsylvania	1922	1926		Lycoming County 543
276	Clinton Valley Council	Waterford	Michigan	1937	2009	Merged with Detroit Area 262	Great Lakes 272
	Coastal Empire Council		Georgia		March 1, 2014	Merged with Okefenokee Area Council	Coastal Georgia Council
188	Cloud County Council	Concordia	Kansas	1922	1924		North Kansas Area 188
652	Coal Belt Area Council	West Frankfort	Illinois	1925	1928	ended/dissolved/disbanded^{[b]}	
8	Cochise County Council	Douglas	Arizona	1922	1963		Catalina 11
206	Cogioba Council	Hopkinsville	Kentucky	1934	1949		Mammoth Cave 206
305	Cole County Council	Jefferson City	Missouri	1923	1929		Central Missouri 653
314	Cole County Council	Jefferson City	Missouri	1931	1931		Jefferson City Area 314
127	Coles, Cumberland and Douglas County Council	Mattoon	Illinois	1929	1931		Kaskaskie 127
569	Collin County Council	McKinney	Texas	1923	1927	Merged with Lamar County 580	Lone Star Area 569
537	Colonel Drake Council	Oil City	Pennsylvania	1942	1972	Merged with Custaloga 531 and Washington Trail 511	French Creek 532
60	Colorado Springs Council	Colorado Springs	Colorado	1916	1922		El Paso and Teller Counties 60
504	Columbia & Montour Counties Council	Bloomsburg	Pennsylvania	1924	1931		Columbia-Montour 504
553	Columbia Council	Columbia	South Carolina	1919	1923		Richland County 553
	Columbia Council	Columbia	Missouri	1917	1919		
380	Columbia County Council	Hudson	New York	1927	1942		Fort Orange 364
605	Columbia District Council	Vancouver	Washington	1923	1924	ended/dissolved/disbanded^{[b]}	
492	Columbia Pacific Council	Portland	Oregon	1966	1993	Merged with Cascade Area 493	Cascade Pacific 492
380	Columbia-Greene Council	Hudson	New York	1924	1927		Columbia County 380
455	Columbiana Council	Lisbon	Ohio	1953	1991		Buckeye 436
455	Columbiana County Council	East Liverpool	Ohio	1926	1953		Columbiana 455
98	Columbus Area Council	Columbus	Georgia	1925	1930		Direct Service
98	Columbus Council	Columbus	Georgia	1919	1923		Muscogee County 98
441	Columbus Council	Columbus	Ohio	1910	1930		Central Ohio 441
472	Comanche County Council	Lawton	Oklahoma	1922	1925		Black Beaver Area 472
479	Comanche Trail Council	Brownwood	Texas	1932	2003	Merged with Chisholm Trail 561	Texas Trails 561
741	Concho Valley Council	San Angelo	Texas	1926	2012	Name changed	Texas Southwest 741
230	Concord Council	Concord	Massachusetts	1919	1926	Merged with Waltham and Watertown 250	Waltham-Watertown-Concord 250
	Concord Council	Concord	North Carolina	1917	1918		
505	Conewago Council	Hanover	Pennsylvania	1919	1930		York 544
	Connelsville Council	Connelsville	Pennsylvania	1917	1924	Merged with Uniontown 537	Fayette County 536
152	Connersville Council	Connersville	Indiana	1922	1924	ended/dissolved/disbanded^{[b]}	
24	Contra Costa County Council	Martinez	California	1922	1932	Merged with Berkeley 23	Berkeley Contra Costa County 23
572	Cooke and Denton Area Council	Gainesville	Texas	1927	1928	Merged with Tarrant County 582	Fort Worth Area 582
570	Cooke County Council	Gainesville	Texas	1921	1924	Merged with Denton	Mo-Co-Wi-De 572
490	Coos County Council	Marshfield	Oregon	1924	1926	Merged with Douglas County 682	Douglas-Coos 682
9	Copper Council	Safford	Arizona	1962	1977		Theodore Roosevelt 10
260	Copper Country Council	Houghton	Michigan	1923	1945	Merged with Chippewa Area 259, Hiawatha Area 261, Iron Range 649 and Red Buck 263	Hiawathaland 261
115	Corn Belt Council	Bloomington	Illinois	1925	1973	Merged with Starved Rock Area 132 and Creve Coeur 138	W.D. Boyce 138
	Corning Council	Corning	New York	1918	1919	ended/dissolved/disbanded^{[b]}	
756	Cornstalk Council	Logan	West Virginia	1953	1954	Name changed	Chief Cornstalk 756
	Coronado Council	Coronado	California	1916	1917		San Diego County 49
	Corpus Christi Council	Corpus Christi	Texas	1917	1923		
	Cortland Council	Cortland	New York	1917	1918		
490	Corvallis Council	Corvallis	Oregon	1922	1924	ended/dissolved/disbanded^{[b]}	
442	Coshocton County Council	Coshocton	Ohio	1922	1928		Kno-Co-Ho-Tus 442
175	Council Bluffs Council	Council Bluffs	Iowa	1919	1926		Waubonsie-Boyer 175
326	Covered Wagon Council	Omaha	Nebraska	1930	1965	Merged with Southwest Iowa	Mid-America 326
201	Covington Council	Covington	Kentucky	1916	1925		Northern Kentucky 201
506	Crawford County Council	Meadville	Pennsylvania	1923	1926		Erie County 511
481	Creek County Council	Olanulgee	Oklahoma	1927	1928	Merged with Creek County 486	Creek Nation Area 481
486	Creek County Council	Sapulpa	Oklahoma	1925	1928	Merged with Creek County 481	Creek Nation Area 481
	Creek County Council	Drumright	Oklahoma	1922	1922	Merged with Stillwater	Cimarron Valley 473
481	Creek Nation Area Council	Okmulgee	Oklahoma	1928	1957	Merged with Tulsa	Indian Nations 488
26	Crescent Bay Area Council	Santa Monica	California	1922	1972	Merged with San Fernando Valley 50	Great Western 51
138	Creve Coeur Council	Peoria	Illinois	1929	1973	Merged with Corn Belt 115 and Starved Rock Area 132	W.D. Boyce 138
	Crockett Council	Crockett	California	1917	1919	ended/dissolved/disbanded^{[b]}	
285	Crow Wing County Council	Brainard	Minnesota	1923	1928	ended/dissolved/disbanded^{[b]}	
677	Crowley Ridge Council	Helena	Arkansas	1924	1926		Mohawk 677
153	Culver Council	Culver	Indiana	1920	1928	ended/dissolved/disbanded^{[b]}	
202	Cumberland Council	Middlesboro	Kentucky	1949	1963		Blue Grass 204
757	Cumberland Council	Cumberland	Maryland	1926	1938		Potomac 757
768	Cumberland Council	Lenoir City	Tennessee	1927	1929	Merged with Knox County 557	Knoxville Area 557
218	Cumberland County Council	Portland	Maine	1922	1933		Pine Tree Council 218
336	Cumberland County Council	Millville	New Jersey	1919	1944		South Jersey 336
506	Cumberland Valley Council	Chambersburg	Pennsylvania	1928	1930	ended/dissolved/disbanded^{[b]}	
531	Custaloga Council	Sharon	Pennsylvania	1969	1972	Merged with Colonel Drake and Washington Trail	French Creek 532
321	Custer County Council	Miles City	Montana	1920	1924		Powder River Area 321
443	Cuyahoga Falls Council	Cuyahoga Falls	Ohio	1921	1925		Greater Cleveland Area 440
84	Dade County Council	Miami	Florida	1921	1945		South Florida 84
571	Dallas Council	Dallas	Texas	1915	1926		Dallas County 571
571	Dallas County Council	Dallas	Texas	1926	1928	Merged with Navarro County 676	Circle Ten 571
	Dalton Council	Dalton	Pennsylvania	1917	1918		
201	Dan Beard Council	Covington	Kentucky	1952	1956	Merged with Cincinnati Area 438	Dan Beard 438
529	Dan Beard Council	Scranton	Pennsylvania	1947	1962	Merged with Mid Valley 501	Forest Lakes 501
528	Daniel Boone Council	Reading	Pennsylvania	1936	1970	Merged with Appalachian Trail 526	Hawk Mountain 528
	Danville Council	Danville	Illinois	1918	1920		
703	Dasota Council	Aberdeen	South Dakota	1931	1933		Merged into 693 and 703
176	Davenport Council	Davenport	Iowa	1915	1928		Buffalo Bill Area 176
586	Davey Crockett Council	Palestine	Texas	1930	1931	Merged with Tejas 472 and Pine Tree Area 585	East Texas Area 585
15	Davy Crockett Council	Tullahoma	Tennessee	1927	1930		Nashville Area 560
444	Dayton Council	Dayton	Ohio	1916	1929	Merged with Piqua 456	Dayton-Miami Valley 444
444	Dayton-Miami Valley Area Council	Dayton	Ohio	1929	1949		Miami Valley 444
121	Decatur Area Council	Decatur	Illinois	1929	1939		Lincoln Trails 121
121	Decatur Council	Decatur	Illinois	1918	1927		Acis 121
314	Deer Lodge Area Council	Anaconda	Montana	1924	1926		Deer Lodge, Granite, and Powell 314
314	Deer Lodge County Council	Anaconda	Montana	1920	1924		Deer Lodge Area 314
314	Deer Lodge, Granite, and Powell Council	Anaconda	Montana	1926	1928		Silver Bow 313
446	Defiance Council	Defiance	Ohio	1920	1925		Shawnee 452
722	Dekalb County Council	Sycamore	Illinois	1925	1927	Name changed	Chief Shabbona 722
507	Delaware and Montgomery County Council	Philadelphia	Pennsylvania	1911	1936		Valley Forge 507
407	Delaware County Council	Walton	New York	1924	1926		Otsego-Schoharie 393
679	Delaware County Council	Muncie	Indiana	1924	1972	Merged with Central Indiana 160, Kikthawenund Area 149 and Whitewater Valley 151	Crossroads of America 160
510	Delaware Valley Area Council	Easton	Pennsylvania	1932	1969	Merged with Lehigh County 729 and Bethlehem Area 498	Minsi Trails 502
261	Delta & Schoolcraft County Council	Gladstone	Michigan	1924	1926		Iron Range 649
300	Delta Area Council	Clarksdale	Mississippi	1924	1993		Chickasaw 558
	Denton Council	Denton	Texas	1921	1924	Merged with Cooke County 570	Mo-Co-Wi-De 572
61	Denver Council	Denver	Colorado	1915	1926		Denver Area 061
69	Derby Council	Derby	Connecticut	1918	1921		Housatonic 69
177	Des Moines Area Council	Des Moines	Iowa	1927	1932	Merged with Tri-Valley 778, Tall Corn Area 169 and Central Iowa 658	Tall Corn Area 177
177	Des Moines Council	Des Moines	Iowa	1914	1926		Polk and Jasper Counties 177
147	Des Plaines Valley Council	La Grange	Illinois	1993	2014	Merged with Calumet Council, Chicago Area Council, Northwest Suburban Council	Pathway to Adventure Council
49	Desert Pacific Council	San Diego	California	1993	2004	Name changed to San Diego-Imperial	San Diego-Imperial 49
29	Desert Trails Council	Yuma	Arizona	1959	1993	Merged with of San Diego 49	San Diego County 49
262	Detroit Area Council	Detroit	Michigan	1926	2009	Merged with Clinton Valley 276	Great Lakes Area Council
262	Detroit Council	Detroit	Michigan	1914	1926		Detroit Area 262
428	Devils Lake Council	Devils Lake	North Dakota	1922	1923		Lake Region District 428
649	Dickinson District Council	Iron Mountain	Michigan	1924	1925		Iron Range Area 649
	Dixon Council	Dixon	Illinois	1917	1918		
	Donora Council	Donora	Pennsylvania	1919	1923		
682	Douglas County Council	Roseburg	Oregon	1924	1926	Merged with Coos County 490	Douglas-Coos 682
682	Douglas-Coos Council	Roseburg	Oregon	1926	1933		Direct Service
	Dover Council	Dover	New Hampshire	1916	1918		
263	Dowagiac Council	Dowagiac	Michigan	1917	1927		Benton Harbor and St Joseph 258
	Drumright Council	Drumright	Oklahoma	1920	1922		Creek County
508	Du Bois District Council	Du Bois	Pennsylvania	1922	1926	ended/dissolved/disbanded^{[b]}	
148	Du Page Area Council	Wheaton	Illinois	1928	1992	Merged with Two Rivers 127	Two Rivers-Du Page Area 127 and Three Fires 127
148	Du Page County Council	Lombard	Illinois	1919	1922		Wheaton 148
178	Dubuque Area Council	Dubuque	Iowa	1934	1935		Northeast Iowa 178
178	Dubuque Council	Dubuque	Iowa	1915	1934	Merged with Clinton Area 174	Dubuque Area 178
286	Duluth Council	Duluth	Minnesota	1919	1936		North Star 286
	Dunkirk Council	Dunkirk	New York	1917	1918		
509	Duquesne Council	Duquesne	Pennsylvania	1920	1929	Number changed to 830	
830	Duquesne Council	Duquesne	Pennsylvania	1929	1930		Allegheny County, West 527
	Durant Council	Durant	Oklahoma	1921	1923		Kiamichi Area 736
696	Durham County Council	Durham	North Carolina	1925	1929	Merged with Wake County 421	Occoneechee 421
374	Dutchess County Council	Hyde Park	New York	1921	1996	Merged with Rockland County 683 and Hudson-Delaware 392	Hudson Valley 374
87	Duval County Council	Jacksonville	Florida	1925	1926		Greater Jacksonville Area 87
346	Eagle Rock Council	Montclair	New Jersey	1931	1976	Merged with Robert Treat and Orange Mountain	Essex 336
211	East Baton Rouge Parish Council	Baton Rouge	Louisiana	1922	1925		Istrouma Area 211
540	East Boroughs Council	Wilkinsburg	Pennsylvania	1921	1973	Merged with Mon-Yough	East Valley Area 530
154	East Chicago Council	East Chicago	Indiana	1919	1921	Merged with Indiana Harbor	Indiana Harbor and East Chicago 154
85	East Coast Council	West Palm Beach	Florida	1922	1925		Palm Beach County 085
718	East Coast Council	Fort Pierce	Florida	1925	1930		
691	East Mississippi Area Council	West Point	Mississippi	1925	1936		Pushmataha Area 691
337	East Orange Council	East Orange	New Jersey	1915	1933	Merged with Orange 353, Orange Mountain 345 and West Orange 363	Oranges and Maplewood Area 337
	East Palestine Council	East Palestine	Ohio	1917	1918		
122	East Saint Louis Area Council	East Saint Louis	Illinois	1919	1936		Mississippi Valley 122
530	East Valley Area Council	Forest Hills	Pennsylvania	1973	1993	Merged with Allegheny Trails 527	Greater Pittsburgh 527
15	Eastern Arkansas Area Council	Jonesboro	Arkansas	1935	2001	Merged into Quapaw Area 18	Quapaw Area 18
76	Eastern Connecticut Council	Norwich	Connecticut	1929	1972	Merged with Pequot 77	Indian Trails 73
109	Eastern Idaho Council	Pocatello	Idaho	1925	1934		Tendoy Area 109
413	Eastern New Mexico Council	Roswell	New Mexico	1925	1953		Conquistador 413
478	Eastern Oklahoma Area Council	Muskogee	Oklahoma	1949	1983		Indian Nations 488
760	Eastern Oregon Area Council	Lagrande	Oregon	1926	1932		Blue Mountain 604
221	Eastern Shore Council	Salisbury	Maryland	1923	1924		Wilmington Area 81
774	Eastland County Council	Eastland	Texas	1927	1929		Oil Belt 774
510	Easton Area Council	Easton	Pennsylvania	1918	1932		Delaware Valley Area 510
621	Eau Claire Council	Eau Claire	Wisconsin	1922	1925		Chippewa and Eau Claire Counties 621
	Effingham Council	Effingham	Illinois	1917	1918		
120	Egyptian Council	Herrin	Illinois	1941	1994	Merged with St Louis Area 312	Saint Louis Area 312
152	Egyptian Council	Carbondale	Illinois	1929	1930	ended/dissolved/disbanded^{[b]}	
60	El Paso & Teller Counties Council	Colorado Springs	Colorado	1922	1925		Pikes Peak 60
573	El Paso Area Council	El Paso	Texas	1928	1937		Yucca 573
573	El Paso Council	El Paso	Texas	1915	1924		El Paso County 573
573	El Paso County Council	El Paso	Texas	1924	1928		El Paso Area 573
123	Elgin Area Council	Elgin	Illinois	1916	1957	Name changed	Fox River Valley 123
	Elizabeth City County Council	Elizabeth City	Virginia	1920	1921		
338	Elizabeth Council	Elizabeth	New Jersey	1916	1928		Union 338
499	Elk Lick Council	Bradford	Pennsylvania	1947	1973	Merged with Chatauqua County 382	Allegheny Highlands 382
155	Elkhart Area Council	Elkhart	Indiana	1927	1935		Pioneer Trails 155
155	Elkhart Council	Elkhart	Indiana	1920	1927		Elkhart Area
316	Elkhorn Area Council	Helena	Montana	1926	1931	ended/dissolved/disbanded^{[b]}	
	Ellenville Council	Ellenville	New York	1917	1918		
	Ellwood City Council	Ellwood City	Pennsylvania	1917	1920		
375	Elmira Area Council	Elmira	New York	1927	1947		Sullivan Trail 375
375	Elmira Council	Elmira	New York	1915	1926		Chemung County 375
	Elyria Council	Elyria	Ohio	1921	1921		
339	Englewood Council	Englewood	New Jersey	1919	1925		North Bergen County 350
474	Enid Council	Enid	Oklahoma	1921	1923		Garfield County 474
511	Erie Council	Erie	Pennsylvania	1915	1936		Erie County 511
376	Erie County Council	Buffalo	New York	1921	1949	Merged with Buffalo 373	Buffalo Area 380
511	Erie County Council	Erie	Pennsylvania	1936	1944		Washington Trail 511
261	Escanaba Council	Escanaba	Michigan	1920	1924	Merged with Manistique and Gladstone	Delta and Schoolcraft County 261
336	Essex Council	Newark	New Jersey	1976	1998	Merged with Bergen 350, Hudson Liberty 348 and Passaic Valley 353	Northern New Jersey
593	Ethan Allen Council	Rutland	Vermont	1965	1972	Merged with Long Trail 592	Green Mountain 592
3	Etowah County Council	Gadsden	Alabama	1919	1925	Name changed	Northeastern Alabama 3
802	EUCOM, BSA Advisory Council	Heidelberg	Germany	1951	1953		Transatlantic 802
124	Evanston Council	Evanston	Illinois	1916	1969	Merged with Northshore Area 714	Evanston-Northshore Area 129
129	Evanston North Shore Area Council	Glencoe	Illinois	1969	1971	Merged with Oak Plain 126	Northeast Illinois 129
156	Evansville Council	Evansville	Indiana	1918	1931		Southern Indiana Area 156
156	Evansville-Vanderburg County Council	Evansville	Indiana	1917	1918		Evansville 156
606	Everett Council	Everett	Washington	1918	1941		Evergreen Area 606
606	Evergreen Area Council	Everett	Washington	1941	1994	Merged with Mount Baker Area 603	Mount Baker 606
287	Eveleth Council	Eveleth	Minnesota	1922	1929	Merged with Arrowhead 298	Iron Range 298
68	Fairfield County Council	Norwalk	Connecticut	1973	1998	Merged with Quinnipiac 74	Connecticut Yankee 72
445	Fairfield County Council	Lancaster	Ohio	1922	1927		Columbus 441
	Fairmont Council	Fairmont	West Virginia	1920	1922		
383	Fairplay Council	Johnson City	New York	1925	1932		Susquenango 368
233	Fall River Area Council	Fall River	Massachusetts	1916	1946		Massasoit 233
673	Falls-Milam-Robertson Area Council	Cameron	Texas	1924	1926		662 and 576
429	Fargo Council	Fargo	North Dakota	1920	1925		Red River Valley 429
288	Faribault Council	Faribault	Minnesota	1921	1926	Merged with New Prague 291 and Northfield 292	Rice-Scott-Le Seur Area 288
536	Fayette County Council	Uniontown	Pennsylvania	1924	1927		Direct Service
15	Fayetteville Council	Fayetteville	Arkansas	1922	1926		
242	Fellsland Council	Winchester	Massachusetts	1932	1959	Merged with Quannopowitt 240 and Sachem 223	Minuteman 240
410	Fennimore Cooper Council	White Plains	New York	1922	1951	Merged with Hendrick Hudson 379	Washington Irving 388
391	Finger Lakes Council	Geneva	New York	1924	2009	Merged with Otetiana 397	Seneca Waterways 397
450	Firelands Area Council	Mansfield	Ohio	1994	1994		Heart of Ohio 450
458	Firelands Area Council	Vermilion	Ohio	1925	1994	Merged with Harding Area 443 and Johnny Appleseed 453 and Firelands Area 450	Heart of Ohio 450
	First Middlesex Mass. Council	Waltham	Massachusetts	1918	1920		223, 241 and 246
231	Fitchburg Area Council	Fitchburg	Massachusetts	1918	1965	Merged with Wachusett 237	Nashua Valley 230
90	Flaming Arrow Council	Lakeland	Florida	1932	1938	Merged with Tampa Bay Area 86	Gulf Ridge 86
264	Flint Council	Flint	Michigan	1916	1927		Muscadawin Area 264
	Florence Council	Florence	South Carolina	1919	1920		
95	Floyd County Council	Rome	Georgia	1919	1923		Cherokee 95
95	Floyd County Council	Rome	Georgia	1923	1925	ended/dissolved/disbanded^{[b]}	
622	Fond du Lac Council	Fond du Lac	Wisconsin	1920	1926		Badger 622
501	Forest Lakes Council	Scranton	Pennsylvania	1962	1990	Merged with Penn Mountains 522	Northeastern Pennsylvania 501
142	Fort Armstrong Area Council	Rock Island	Illinois	1946	1959	Merged with Moline Area 134	Sac-N-Fox 134
	Fort Collins Council	Fort Collins	Colorado	1917	1919		
179	Fort Dodge Council	Fort Dodge	Iowa	1919	1942		Prairie Gold Area 179
448	Fort Hamilton Council	Hamilton	Ohio	1935	1959		Dan Beard 438
279	Fort Hill Council	Sturgis	Michigan	1929	1931		Kalamazoo-Fruit Belt 270
322	Fort Kearney Council	Kearney	Nebraska	1924	1926	ended/dissolved/disbanded^{[b]}	
462	Fort Laurens Area Council	Massillon	Ohio	1929	1930		Massillon 462
180	Fort Madison Council	Fort Madison	Iowa	1920	1928	ended/dissolved/disbanded^{[b]}	
364	Fort Orange Council	Albany	New York	1923	1963	Merged with Uncle Sam 409	Fort Orange-Uncle Sam 364
364	Fort Orange-Uncle Sam Council	Albany	New York	1963	1971	Name changed	Governor Clinton 364
189	Fort Scott Council	Fort Scott	Kansas	1920	1925		Mo-Kan Area 306
614	Fort Simcoe Area Council	Yakima	Washington	1954	1992	Merged with North Central Washington 613	Grand Columbia 614
16	Fort Smith Area Council	Fort Smith	Arkansas	1930	1936		Westark Area 16
16	Fort Smith Council	Fort Smith	Arkansas	1920	1924		Fort Smith-Van Buren 16
16	Fort Smith-Van Buren Council	Fort Smith	Arkansas	1925	1928	Merged with Ozark 753	Northwest Arkansas 16
398	Fort Stanwix Council	Rome	New York	1929	1968	Merged with Madison County 389	Iroquois 395
459	Fort Steuben Area Council	Steubenville	Ohio	1929	1991	Merged with National Trail 619	Ohio River Valley 619
157	Fort Wayne Council	Fort Wayne	Indiana	1916	1924		Allen County 157
582	Fort Worth Area Council	Fort Worth	Texas	1927	1949		Longhorn 582
582	Fort Worth Council	Fort Worth	Texas	1920	1922		Tarrant County 582
52	Forty Niner Council	Stockton	California	1957	1997	Merged with Yosemite Area 59	Greater Yosemite Area 59
628	Four Lakes Council	Madison	Wisconsin	1929	2005	Merged with Sinnissippi 626	Glacier's Edge
207	Four Rivers Council	Paducah	Kentucky	1941	1994	Merged with Audubon 200	Many Waters 200
213	Fourth District Council	Monroe	Louisiana	1923	1925		Ouachita Valley 213
123	Fox River Valley Council	Elgin	Illinois	1957	1972		Two Rivers 127
635	Fox River Valley Council	Appleton	Wisconsin	1924	1925		Valley 635
735	Fox Valley Council	St Charles	Illinois	1926	1931	Merged with Chief Shabbona 722	Chief Shabbona 735
	Foxboro Council	Foxboro	Massachusetts	1917	1919		
732	Francis Scott Key Council	Frederick	Maryland	1928	1930		Washington D.C. 82
202	Frankfort Council	Frankfort	Kentucky	1916	1925	Name changed	Isaac Shelby 202
652	Franklin & Williamson County Council	North Frankfort	Illinois	1924	1925		Coal Belt Area 652
222	Frederick Council	Frederick	Maryland	1917	1924	ended/dissolved/disbanded^{[b]}	
732	Frederick County Council	Frederick	Maryland	1926	1928		Francis Scott Key 732
	Fredericksburg Council	Fredericksburg	Virginia	1916	1918		
327	Fremont Council	Fremont	Nebraska	1920	1923		Pawnee 327
27	Fresno Council	Fresno	California	1919	1925		Sequoia 27
	Front Royal Council	Front Royal	Virginia	1916	1918		
	Frostburg Council	Frostburg	Maryland	1917	1919		
270	Fruit Belt Area Council	Kalamazoo	Michigan	1937	1973	Merged with Nottawa Trails 256 and Southwestern Michigan 258	Southwest Michigan 270
377	Fulton County Council	Gloversville	New York	1923	1937		Sir William Johnson 377
428	Gainesville Area Council	Gainesville	Georgia	1928	1932		Direct Service
125	Galesburg Council	Galesburg	Illinois	1919	1927		Knox-Warren 125
	Galva Council	Galva	Illinois	1918	1920		
574	Galveston Council	Galveston	Texas	1919	1925		Galveston County 574
574	Galveston County Council	Galveston	Texas	1925	1937		Bay Area 574
232	Gardner Council	Gardner	Massachusetts	1921	1924		Monadnock 232
474	Garfield County Council	Enid	Oklahoma	1923	1927	Merged with Northwest Oklahoma 570	Great Salt Plains 474
475	Garvin and McClain Area Council	Purcell	Oklahoma	1922	1925	Merged with Ardmore 468	Red River Area 468
158	Gary Council	Gary	Indiana	1918	1940		Sauk Trails
	Gastonia Council	Gastonia	North Carolina	1917	1918		
418	General Greene Council	Greensboro	North Carolina	1947	1992	Merged with Uwharrie 419	Old North State 70
400	General Herkimer Council	Herkimer	New York	1934	2001	Merged with Land of The Oneidas 395	Revolutionary Trails 400
779	General Sullivan Council	Towanda	Pennsylvania	1927	1992		Five Rivers 375
367	Genesee & Wyoming Co's Council	Batavia	New York	1924	1925		Genesee 367
367	Genesee Council	Batavia	New York	1926	1994	Merged with Lewiston Trail 385	Lewiston Trail 385 and Iroquois Trail 385
	Geneseo Council	Geneseo	Illinois	1917	1920		
94	George H. Lanier Council	West Point	Georgia	1950	1989		Chattahoochee 91
143	George Rogers Clark Area Council	New Albany	Indiana	1927	1993	Merged with Old Kentucky Home 205	Old Kentucky Home 205
145	George Rogers Clark Council	Princeton	Indiana	1924	1926		Evansville 156
290	George Washington Council	Hibbing	Minnesota	1925	1929		Headwaters Area 290
362	George Washington Council	Pennington	New Jersey	1937	1999	Merged with Thomas Edison 352	Central New Jersey
91	Georgia-Alabama Council	Columbus	Georgia	1934	1964	Merged with West Georgia 90	Chattahoochee 91
266	Gerald R. Ford Council	Grand Rapids	Michigan	1995	2012	Merged with Scenic Trails 274	President Gerald R Ford Field Service Council 781
579	Gila Grande Council	Silver City	New Mexico	1927	1930		El Paso Area 573
634	Gitche Gumee Council	Superior	Wisconsin	1936	1959	Merged with North Star 286	Lake Superior 286
317	Glacier Park Area Council	Kalispell	Montana	1923	1927	ended/dissolved/disbanded^{[b]}	
	Gladstone Council	Gladstone	Michigan	1922	1924	Merged with Escanaba 261 and Manistique	Delta and Schoolcraft County 261
127	Glen Ellyn Council	Glen Ellyn	Illinois	1920	1929	Merged with Wheaton 148	Du Page Area 148
340	Glen Ridge Council	Glen Ridge	New Jersey	1912	1929	Number changed to (821)	
821	Glen Ridge Council	Glen Ridge	New Jersey	1929	1931	Merged with Caldwell 820	Montclair 346
126	Glencoe Council	Glencoe	Illinois	1923	1926	Merged with Highland Park 714	North Shore Area 714
58	Glendale Council	Glendale	California	1920	1922		Verdugo Hills 58
378	Glens Falls Council	Glens Falls	New York	1922	1927		Mohican 378
	Globe Council	Globe	Arizona	1916	1919	ended/dissolved/disbanded^{[b]}	
678	Gloucester-Salem Council	Woodstown	New Jersey	1924	1967	Merged with South Jersey 336	Southern New Jersey 334
364	Governor Clinton Council	Loudenville	New York	1971	1990	Merged with Saratoga County 684 and Sir William Johnson 377	Twin Rivers 364
471	Grady County Council	Chickasha	Oklahoma	1926	1930	Merged with Navajo Mountain Area 476	Black Beaver 471
	Grafton Council	Grafton	West Virginia	1922	1923		
9	Grand Canyon Council	Flagstaff	Arizona	1922	1929		Yavapai-Mohave 12
12	Grand Canyon Council	Flagstaff	Arizona	1944	1993	Merged with Theodore Roosevelt 10	Grand Canyon 10
614	Grand Columbia Council	Yakima	Washington	1919	2023		Chief Seattle 609
430	Grand Forks Area Council	Grand Forks	North Dakota	1931	1933		Lake Agassiz 430
430	Grand Forks Council	Grand Forks	North Dakota	1922	1924		Grand Forks County 430
430	Grand Forks County Council	Grand Forks	North Dakota	1924	1926		Greater Grand Forks Area 430
265	Grand Haven Council	Grand Haven	Michigan	1920	1925	Merged with Holland 267	Ottawa County 711
323	Grand Island Council	Grand Island	Nebraska	1920	1922		Hall County 323
323	Grand Island Council	Grand Island	Nebraska	1924	1926	ended/dissolved/disbanded^{[b]}	
266	Grand Rapids Area Council	Grand Rapids	Michigan	1915	1936		Grand Valley 266
266	Grand Valley Council	Grand Rapids	Michigan	1936	1975	Merged with Timber Trails 275	West Michigan Shores 266
128	Granite City Council	Granite City	Illinois	1920	1922		Tri-City 128
163	Grant County Council	Marion	Indiana	1918	1921		Marion City 163
24	Grayback Council	Redlands	California	1952	1974		California Inland Empire 45
607	Grays Harbor County Council	Aberdeen	Washington	1923	1930		Twin Harbors Area 607
568	Grayson County Council	Denison/Sherman	Texas	1924	1930		
315	Great Falls Area Council	Great Falls	Montana	1925	1929		North Central Montana 315
315	Great Falls Council	Great Falls	Montana	1915	1925		Great Falls Area 315
431	Great Plains Area Council	Minot	North Dakota	1929	1974	Merged with Lake Agassiz 430, Missouri Valley 432 and Red River Valley 429	Northern Lights 429
590	Great Salt Lake Council	Salt Lake City	Utah	1951	2020	Consolidated with Utah National Parks 591 and Trapper Trails 589	Crossroads of the West Council 590
474	Great Salt Plains Council	Enid	Oklahoma	1927	2000	Merged with Will Rogers 473	Cimarron
255	Great Sauk Trail Council	Ann Arbor	Michigan	1993	2012	Merged with Southwest Michigan 270	Southern Shores Field Service Council 783
412	Great Southwest Area Council	Albuquerque	New Mexico	1976	1982	Name changed	Great Southwest 412
243	Great Trails Council	Dalton	Massachusetts	1969	2008	Merged with Pioneer Valley 234	Western Massachusetts 234
51	Great Western Council	Van Nuys	California	1972	1985	Name changed	Western Los Angeles County 51
227	Greater Boston Council	Boston	Massachusetts	1980	1993	Merged with Minuteman 240	Boston Minuteman 227
	Greater Boston Council	Boston	Massachusetts	1911	1918		Municipal Boston 227
430	Greater Grand Forks Area Council	Grand Forks	North Dakota	1926	1931		Grand Forks Area 430
87	Greater Jacksonville Council	Jacksonville	Florida	1926	1939		North Florida 87
518	Greater Johnstown Area Council	Johnstown	Pennsylvania	1932	1939		Admiral Robert E. Peary 518
238	Greater Lowell Council	Chelmsford	Massachusetts	1927	1999	Merged into Yankee Clipper 236	Yankee Clipper 236
	Greater New York Advisory Council	New York City	New York	1915	1925		Boy Scout Foundation of GNY 719
719	Greater New York Council	New York	New York	1936	1967		Greater New York 640
380	Greater Niagara Frontier Council	Buffalo	New York		2023	Merged with Iroquois Trail Council	Western New York 380
527	Greater Pittsburgh Council	Pittsburgh	Pennsylvania	1993	2011	Merged with Penn's Woods 508	Laurel Highlands 527
546	Greater Providence Area Council	Providence	Rhode Island	1926	1930	Merged with Woonsocket 549, Pawtucket and Central Falls 548	Narragansett 546
308	Greater Springfield Area Council	Springfield	Missouri	1923	1930		Springfield 308
308	Greater Springfield Area Council	Springfield	Missouri	1940	1941		Ozarks Empire Area 308
62	Greeley Council	Greeley	Colorado	1916	1924		Weld and Morgan County 62
621	Green Bay Area Council	Green Bay	Wisconsin	1930	1934		Nicolet Area 621
	Green Bay Council	Green Bay	Wisconsin	1920	1922		
593	Green Mountain Council	Rutland	Vermont	1929	1965	Merged with Calvin Coolidge	Ethan Allen 593
766	Greene County Council	Cairo	New York	1926	1930		Ulster County 405
	Greenfield Council	Greenfield	Massachusetts	1917	1920		
418	Greensboro Council	Greensboro	North Carolina	1918	1947		General Greene 418
551	Greenville Council	Greenville	South Carolina	1923	1932		Blue Ridge 551
67	Greenwich Council	Greenwich	Connecticut	1917	1929	Number changed to (810)	
95	Griffin Area Council	Griffin	Georgia	1927	1930		Flint River 95
	Groton Council	Groton	Massachusetts	1917	1919		
513	Grove City Council	Grove City	Pennsylvania	1922	1927	Merged with Shenango Valley 531	Mercer County 531
680	Guadalupe Valley Area Council	Victoria	Texas	1924	1928		Tonqua Area 547
800	Guam Council	Agana	Guam	1947	1956		Direct Service
577	Gulf Coast Council (Texas)	Corpus Christi	Texas	1929	2003	Name changed	South Texas 577
765	Gulf Hills Council	Dade City	Florida	1927	1930		Tampa Bay Area 86
86	Gulf Ridge Council	Tampa	Florida	1939	2016	Merged with West Central Florida 89	Greater Tampa Bay Area Council 86
	Guthrie Council	Guthrie	Oklahoma	1917	1918		
	Guyasuta Council	Aspinwall	Pennsylvania	1921	1922	From Allegheny County 1921	
725	Halifax Council	Daytona Beach	Florida	1925	1933		Central Florida 83
323	Hall County Council	Grand Island	Nebraska	1922	1924		Grand Island 323
	Hamburg Council	Hamburg	New York	1917	1920		
448	Hamilton Council	Hamilton	Ohio	1919	1925		Butler County 448
159	Hammond Council	Hammond	Indiana	1918	1937		Pokagan 159
234	Hampden County Council	Springfield	Massachusetts	1923	1960	Merged with Mount Tom 236	Pioneer Valley 234
235	Hampshire County Council	Northampton	Massachusetts	1922	1930		Hampshire-Franklin 235
235	Hampshire-Franklin Council	Northampton	Massachusetts	1930	1969	Merged with Berkshire 226	Great Trails 243
	Hampton Council	Hampton	Virginia	1916	1918		
449	Hancock County Council	Findlay	Ohio	1923	1930		Put-Han-Sen Area 449
443	Harding Area Council	Marion	Ohio	1926	1994	Merged with Johnny Appleseed 453 and Firelands 458	Firelands Area 458
	Harlan Council	Harlan	Kentucky	1918	1918		
576	Harris County Council	Houston	Texas	1923	1927		Houston Area 576
515	Harrisburg Area Council	Harrisburg	Pennsylvania	1927	1948		Keystone Area 515
515	Harrisburg Council	Harrisburg	Pennsylvania	1916	1927		Harrisburg Area 515
161	Harrison Trails Council	Lafayette	Indiana	1940	1973	Merged with Meshingomesia 163 and Three Rivers 162	Sagamore 162
70	Hartford Council	Hartford	Connecticut	1915	1933		Charter Oak 70
	Hartington Council	Hartington	Nebraska	1917	1918		
	Harvard Council	Harvard	Massachusetts	1917	1919		
447	Hayes Area Council	Fremont	Ohio	1925	1929	Merged with Maumee Valley 460	Toledo Area 460
514	Hazleton Council	Hazleton	Pennsylvania	1921	1927		Anthracite 514
290	Headwaters Area Council	Hibbing	Minnesota	1929	1994	Merged with Lake Superior 286	Voyageurs Area 286
662	Heart O' Texas Council	Waco	Texas	1929	2001	Merged with Longhorn	Longhorn
316	Helena Council	Helena	Montana	1919	1925		Lewis and Clark Area 316
28	Hemet-San Jacinto Valley Council	Hemet	California	1923	1927		Riverside Area 45
379	Hendrick Hudson Council	Ossining	New York	1922	1951	Merged with Fennimore Cooper 410	Washington Irving 388
289	Hennepin County Council	Minneapolis	Minnesota	1922	1928		Minneapolis Area 289
400	Herkimer County Council	Herkimer	New York	1928	1934		General Herkimer 400
	Herkimer County Council	Herkimer	New York	1919	1923		Utica 406
261	Hiawatha Area Council	Marquette	Michigan	1933	1945	Merged with Chippewa Area 259, Copper Country 260, Iron Range 649 and Red Buck 263	Hiawathaland 261
373	Hiawatha Council	Syracuse	New York	1969	1998	Merged with Seaway Valley 403	Hiawatha Seaway 373
733	Hiawatha Council	Madison	South Dakota	1926	1927	Merged with Southern South Dakota 716	Sioux 733
373	Hiawatha Seaway Council	Syracuse	New York	1999	2010	From merger of Hiawatha 373 and Seaway Valley 403	Longhouse Council 373
261	Hiawathaland Council	Marquette	Michigan	1945	2012	Merged	Bay Lakes Council
290	Hibbing Council	Hibbing	Minnesota	1920	1925	Merged with Chisholm 284	George Washington 290
	High Bridge Council	High Bridge	New Jersey	1917	1919		
419	High Point Council	High Point	North Carolina	1917	1923		Uwharrie 419
714	Highland Park Council	Highland Park	Illinois	1925	1926	Merged with Glencoe 126	North Shore Area 714
86	Hillsborough County Council	Tampa	Florida	1922	1925		Tampa Bay Area 86
301	Hinds and Rankin Counties Council	Jackson	Mississippi	1922	1927	Merged with Vicksburg 304	Kickapoo Area 301
476	Hobart Council	Hobart	Oklahoma	1922	1925	ended/dissolved/disbanded^{[b]}	
341	Hoboken Council	Hoboken	New Jersey	1921	1936	Merged with Jersey City 342	Hudson 342
267	Holland Council	Holland	Michigan	1923	1925	Merged with Grand Haven 265	Ottawa County 711
	Holland Council	Holland	Michigan	1917	1918		
236	Holyoke Area Council	Holyoke	Massachusetts	1923	1949		Mount Tom 236
516	Homestead & Affiliated Terr. Council	Munhall	Pennsylvania	1924	1926		Homestead District 516
516	Homestead Council	Munhall	Pennsylvania	1920	1924		Homestead and Affiliated Territory 516
516	Homestead District Council	Munhall	Pennsylvania	1926	1952		Monongahela Valley 516
104	Honolulu Council	Honolulu	Hawaii	1914	1924		Honolulu County I04
104	Honolulu County Council	Honolulu	Hawaii	1924	1957		Aloha 104
149	Hoosier Council	Anderson	Indiana	1929	1931		Chief Anderson 149
150	Hoosier Hills Area Council	Du Pont	Indiana	1929	1973	Merged with White River Area 145	Hoosier Trails 145
206	Hopkinsville-Clarksville Council	Hopkinsville	Kentucky	1933	1934		Cogioba 206
	Hoquiam Council	Hoquiam Heights	Washington	1918	1919		
	Hornell Council	Hornell	New York	1917	1918		
14	Hot Springs Council	Hot Springs	Arkansas	1918	1925		Quachita Area 14
	Houghton Council	Houghton	Michigan	1918	1918		
576	Houston Area Council	Houston	Texas	1927	1936		Sam Houston Area 576
576	Houston Council	Houston	Texas	1913	1923		Harris County 576
342	Hudson Council	Jersey City	New Jersey	1937	1968	Merged with Alexander Hamilton 351	Hudson-Hamilton 348
348	Hudson Liberty Council	Jersey City	New Jersey	1993	1998	Merged with Bergen, Essex and Passaic Valley	Northern New Jersey
392	Hudson-Delaware Council	Middletown	New York	1958	1996	Merged with Dutchess County 374 and Rockland County 683	Hudson Valley 374
348	Hudson-Hamilton Council	Jersey City	New Jersey	1968	1993	Name changed	Hudson Liberty 348
672	Huntington Area Council	Huntington	West Virginia	1924	1935		Tri-State Area 672
672	Huntington Council	Huntington	West Virginia	1919	1924		Huntington Area 672
	Huntington Council	Huntington	New York	1917	1918		
693	Huron Area Council	Huron	South Dakota	1925	1928		Central South Dakota 693
	Huron Council	Huron	South Dakota	1920	1922		
619	Huroquois Council	Wheeling	West Virginia	1926	1966	Name changed	National Trail 619
190	Hutchinson Council	Hutchinson	Kansas	1922	1929		Southwest Kansas Area 190
401	Hutchinson River Council	New Rochelle	New York	1962	1973	Merged with Washington Irving 388	Westchester-Putnam 388
107	Idaho Falls Council	Idaho Falls	Idaho	1922	1925		Teton Peaks 107
110	Idaho Panhandle Council	Hayden Lake	Idaho	1928	1992		Inland Northwest 611
117	Illiana Council	Champaign	Illinois	1991	1992	Name changed	Prairielands 117
769	Illini Area Council	Macomb	Illinois	1927	1932		Knox-Warren 125
29	Imperial County Council	El Centro	California	1922	1929		Imperial-Yuma Area 29
29	Imperial Yuma Council	El Centro	California	1929	1959		Desert Trails 29
193	Independence Council (Kansas)	Independence	Kansas	1919	1923		Montgomery County 193
193	Independence Council (Kansas)	Independence	Kansas	1926	1930	Merged with Sekan Area 744	Sekan Area 193
	Independence Council (Missouri)	Independence	Missouri	1919	1922		Jackson County
131	Indian Creek Council	Kewanee	Illinois	1936	1938		Wigwam 125
73	Indian Trails Council (Connecticut)	Norwich	Connecticut	1971	1995	Merged with Long Rivers 66	Connecticut Rivers 66
633	Indian Trails Council (Wisconsin)	Janesville	Wisconsin	1928	1966	Merged with State Line 620	Sinnissippi 626
517	Indiana County Council	Indiana	Pennsylvania	1919	1933		William Penn 517
154	Indiana Harbor & East Chicago Council	East Chicago	Indiana	1921	1925		Twin City 154
	Indiana Harbor Council	Indiana Harbor	Indiana	1919	1921	Merged with East Chicago	Indiana Harbor and East Chicago 154
160	Indianapolis & Central Indiana Council	Indianapolis	Indiana	1934	1942		Central Indiana 160
160	Indianapolis Council	Indianapolis	Indiana	1915	1934		Indianapolis and Central Indiana 160
295	Indianhead Council	Saint Paul	Minnesota	1955	2005	Merged with Viking 289	Northern Star 250
611	Inland Empire Council	Spokane	Washington	1931	1987	Name changed	Inland Northwest 611
727	Inter-City Council	Chelsea	Massachusetts	1927	1928	Merged with Needham 244	Boston 227
	Iola Council	Iola	Kansas	1920	1923		
	Ionia Council	Ionia	Michigan	1918	1920		
181	Iowa City Area Council	Iowa City	Iowa	1924	1941		Iowa River Valley 181
181	Iowa City Council	Iowa City	Iowa	1920	1924		Iowa City Area 181
181	Iowa River Valley Council	Iowa City	Iowa	1941	1952	Merged with Waubeek Area 172	Hawkeye Area 172
298	Iron Range Council (Minnesota)	Virginia	Minnesota	1928	1932		Headwaters Area 290
649	Iron Range Council (Michigan)	Stambaugh	Michigan	1938	1945	Merged with Chippewa Area 259, Copper Country 260, Hiawatha Area 261 and Red Buck 263	Hiawathaland 261
649	Iron Range Council (Michigan)	Iron Mountain	Michigan	1926	1927	ended/dissolved/disbanded^{[b]}	
649	Iron Range Council (Michigan)	Iron Mountain	Michigan	1928	1933	ended/dissolved/disbanded^{[b]}	
268	Ironwood Council	Ironwood	Michigan	1922	1926	ended/dissolved/disbanded^{[b]}	
395	Iroquois Council	Rome	New York	1969	1981	Merged with Upper Mohawk 406	Land of The Oneidas 395
385	Iroquois Trail Council	Lockport	New York	1994	1994		Iroquois Trail 376
376	Iroquois Trail Council	Batavia	New York		2023	Merged with Greater Niagara Frontier Council	Western New York 380
	Irvington Council	Irvington	New Jersey	1917	1920		
	Irvington Council	Irvington	New Jersey	1922	1923		
202	Isaac Shelby Council	Frankfort	Kentucky	1925	1929	Merged with Kentucky, Daniel Boone 206 and Lexington 204	Blue Grass 204
381	Ithaca Council	Ithaca	New York	1917	1926		Thompkins County 381
269	Jackson Area Council	Jackson	Michigan	1926	1937		Land O'Lakes 269
269	Jackson Council	Jackson	Michigan	1912	1926		Jackson Area 269
301	Jackson Council	Jackson	Mississippi	1918	1922		Hinds and Rankin Counties 301
303	Jackson Council	Jackson	Mississippi	1930	1937	Merged with Kickapoo Area 301	Andrew Jackson Area 303
309	Jackson County Council	Kansas City	Missouri	1924	1925	Name changed	Kansas City Area 309
	Jackson County Council	Altus	Oklahoma	1920	1922		Navajo Mountain 476
	Jackson County Council	Independence	Missouri	1922	1924	Merged with Kansas City 309	Jackson County 309
87	Jacksonville Council	Jacksonville	Florida	1920	1925		Duval County 87
	Jacksonville Council	Jacksonville	Florida	1918	1919		
348	Jamesburg Council	Jamesburg	New Jersey	1943	1951	ended/dissolved/disbanded^{[b]}	
382	Jamestown Council	Jamestown	New York	1921	1925		Chautauqua County 382
	Janesville Council	Janesville	Wisconsin	1928	1928		
306	Jasper & Newton Counties Council	Joplin	Missouri	1926	1929		Mo-Kan Area 306
487	Je-Ste-Co Council	Duncan	Oklahoma	1930	1932		Black Beaver 471
408	Jefferson & Lewis Area Council	Watertown	New York	1925	1932		Jefferson Lewis 408
685	Jefferson & Marion County Council	Centralia	Illinois	1924	1928		139 and 116
314	Jefferson City Area Council	Jefferson City	Missouri	1931	1936		Lake of The Ozarks 314
	Jefferson City Council	Jefferson City	Missouri	1917	1919		
17	Jefferson County Council	Pine Bluff	Arkansas	1919	1930		Kanawha Area 17
408	Jefferson Lewis Council	Watertown	New York	1929	1982	Merged with St Lawrence 403	Seaway Valley 403
487	Jefferson-Stephens Area Council	Duncan	Oklahoma	1924	1930		Je-Ste-Co 487
342	Jersey City Council	Jersey City	New Jersey	1918	1936	Merged with Hoboken 341	Hudson 342
	Jesup Council	Jesup	Iowa	1918	1918		
639	Jim Bridger Council	Rock Springs	Wyoming	1946	1993	Merged with Cache Valley 588 and Lake Bonneville 589	Trapper Trails 589
135	John A. Logan Council	Murphysboro	Illinois	1925	1928	ended/dissolved/disbanded^{[b]}	
453	Johnny Appleseed Area Council	Mansfield	Ohio	1926	1994	Merged with Harding Area 443+Firelands 458	Firelands Area 458
383	Johnson City & Endicott Council	Endicott	New York	1922	1925		Fairplay 383
559	Johnson City Council	Johnson City	Tennessee	1919	1923		Washington County 559
518	Johnstown Council	Johnstown	Pennsylvania	1921	1932		Greater Johnstown Area 518
702	Joliet Council	Joliet	Illinois	1925	1928		Rainbow 702
19	Jonesboro Council	Jonesboro	Arkansas	1917	1923		Saint Francis Valley 19
306	Joplin Council	Joplin	Missouri	1916	1926		Jasper and Newton Counties 306
270	Kalamazoo Area Council	Kalamazoo	Michigan	1927	1929		Kalamazoo-Fruit Belt Area 270
270	Kalamazoo Council	Kalamazoo	Michigan	1915	1927		Kalamazoo Area 270
270	Kalamazoo Fruitbelt Area Council	Kalamazoo	Michigan	1929	1937		Fruit Belt Area 270
317	Kalispell Council	Kalispell	Montana	1922	1923		Glacier Park Area 317
17	Kanawha Area Council	Pine Bluff	Arkansas	1930	1934		Desoto 13 and Quapaw 18
130	Kankakee Council	Kankakee	Illinois	1923	1929		To-Perr-Ne-Bee 130
309	Kansas City Area Council	Kansas City	Missouri	1925	1974	Merged with Kaw 191	Heart of America 307
191	Kansas City Council	Kansas City	Kansas	1920	1922		Wyandotte County 191
309	Kansas City Council	Kansas City	Missouri	1915	1923	Merged with Jackson County	Jackson County 309
190	Kanza Council	Hutchinson	Kansas	1946	1997	Merged into Quivira 198	Quivira 198
114	Kaskaskia Council	Belleville	Illinois	1937	1966	Merged with Mississippi Valley 122	Okaw Valley 116
127	Kaskaskie Council	Mattoon	Illinois	1931	1932		
191	Kaw Council	Kansas City	Kansas	1929	1974	Merged with Kansas City Area 307	Heart of America 307
322	Kearney Council	Kearney	Nebraska	1920	1922		Buffalo County 322
322	Kearney Council	Kearney	Nebraska	1923	1924		Fort Kearney 322
113	Kedeka Area Council	Aurora	Illinois	1955	1968	Merged with Chief Shabbona 735	Two Rivers 127
73	Keemosahbee Council	New Britain	Connecticut	1953	1967	Merged with Bristol 66	Nathan Hale 72
623	Kenosha Council	Kenosha	Wisconsin	1917	1929		Kenosha County 623
623	Kenosha Council	Kenosha	Wisconsin	1961	1972	Merged with Racine County	Southwest Wisconsin 634
623	Kenosha County Council	Kenosha	Wisconsin	1929	1961	Name changed	Kenosha 623
626	Kentucky-West Virginia Council	Williamson	West Virginia	1930	1934	Merged with Logan-Boone Area 756	Logan-Boone-Mingo Area 756
206	Kentucky, Daniel Boone Council	Winchester	Kentucky	1924	1929	Merged with Lexington 204 and Isaac Shelby 202	Blue Grass 204
	Keokuk Council	Keokuk	Iowa	1918	1919		
30	Kern County Council	Bakersfield	California	1922	1965	Name changed	Southern Sierra 30
632	Kettle-Moraine Council	Sheboygan	Wisconsin	1935	1973	Merged with Badger 622, Waumegesako 625, Nicolet Area 621, Valley 635 and Twin Lakes 630	Bay Lakes 635
131	Kewanee Council	Kewanee	Illinois	1920	1936		Indian Creek 131
515	Keystone Area Council	Mechanicsburg	Pennsylvania	1948	2010	Merged with York Adams Area 544	Keystone York-Adams 544
544	Keystone York-Adams Council	Mechanicsburg	Pennsylvania	2010	2010	Name changed	New Birth of Freedom 544
736	Kiamichi Area Council	Hugo/Durant	Oklahoma	1926	1930		568, 580, 468 and 484
301	Kickapoo Area Council	Vicksburg	Mississippi	1927	1937	Merged with Jackson 303	Andrew Jackson Area 303
585	Kickapoo Council	Tyler	Texas	1924	1926	ended/dissolved/disbanded^{[b]}	
665	Kickapoo Council	Paris	Illinois	1929	1932		Piankeshaw 739
149	Kikthawenund Area Council	Anderson	Indiana	1935	1972	Merged with Central Indiana 160, Whitewater Valley 151 and Delaware County 679	Crossroads of America 160
103	Kilauea Council	Hilo	Hawaii	1922	1972		Aloha 104
405	Kingston Council	Kingston	New York	1916	1919		Ulster County 405
575	Kingsville Council	Kingsville	Texas	1918	1924	ended/dissolved/disbanded^{[b]}	
307	Kirksville Council	Kirksville	Missouri	1920	1925		Northeast Missouri 307
412	Kit Carson Council	Albuquerque	New Mexico	1955	1976	Name changed	Great Southwest Area 412
575	Kit Carson Council	Raton	New Mexico	1927	1929		Rio Grande 412
646	Kit Carson Council	Sacramento	California	1924	1927		Sacramento 47
	Kittaning-Ford City Council	Ford City	Pennsylvania	1917	1922		
746	Klamath County Council	Klamath Falls	Oregon	1926	1932		Crater Lake 491
442	Kno-Co-Ho-Tus Area Council	Coshocton	Ohio	1928	1947		Tomahawk Area 442
557	Knox County Council	Knoxville	Tennessee	1915	1930	Merged with Cumberland 768	Knoxville Area 557
244	Knox Trail Council	Marlborough	Massachusetts	1996	2017	Merged with Old Colony 249	Mayflower 251
125	Knox-Warren Council	Galesburg	Illinois	1927	1934		Wigwam 125
557	Knoxville Area Council	Knoxville	Tennessee	1930	1943		Great Smoky Mountain 557
	Kokomo Council	Kokomo	Indiana	1919	1924	ended/dissolved/disbanded^{[b]}	
618	Kootaga Area Council	Parkersburg	West Virginia	1933	1990	Merged with Central West Virginia 616	Allohak 618
161	La Fayette & W. La Fayette Council	La Fayette	Indiana	1925	1926		Tippecanoe County 161
161	La Fayette Council	La Fayette	Indiana	1921	1925		La Fayette and West La Fayette 161
132	La Salle & Oglesby Council	La Salle	Illinois	1924	1926	Merged with Peru and Peru township 139	Starved Rock Area 132
624	Lacrosse Council	Lacrosse	Wisconsin	1921	1925		Gateway Area 624
	Lacrosse Council	Lacrosse	Wisconsin	1917	1918		
	Lafollette Council	Lafollette	Tennessee	1921	1923		
494	Lagrande Council	Lagrande	Oregon	1921	1924	ended/dissolved/disbanded^{[b]}	
430	Lake Agassiz Council	Grand Forks	North Dakota	1933	1974	Merged with Great Plains Area 431, Missouri Valley 432 and Red River Valley 429	Northern Lights 429
589	Lake Bonneville Council	Ogden	Utah	1951	1993	Merged with Jim Bridger 639 and Cache Valley 589	Trapper Trails 589
209	Lake Charles Council	Lake Charles	Louisiana	1920	1922		Calcasieu Parish 209
146	Lake County Council	Waukegan	Illinois	1928	1935		North Shore Area 714
265	Lake Huron Area Council	Auburn	Michigan	1971	2012	Merged with Tall Pine 264, Chief Okemos 271 and Blue Water 277	Water and Woods Field Service Council 782
314	Lake of The Ozarks Council	Jefferson City	Missouri	1936	1971		Great Rivers 653
428	Lake Region District Council	Devils Lake	North Dakota	1923	1925	ended/dissolved/disbanded^{[b]}	
407	Lake Shore Council	Dunkirk	New York	1929	1941	Merged with Chatauqua Lake Area 382	Chautauqua County 382
286	Lake Superior Council	Duluth	Minnesota	1959	1994	Merged with Headwaters Area 290	Voyageurs Area 286
90	Lakeland Council	Lakeland	Florida	1919	1923		South Florida Area 90
90	Lakeland Council	Lakeland	Florida	1926	1931	ended/dissolved/disbanded^{[b]}	
580	Lamar County Council	Paris	Texas	1925	1928	Merged with Collin County 569	Lone Star Area 580
445	Lancaster Council	Lancaster	Ohio	1917	1922		Fairfield County 445
519	Lancaster Council	Lancaster	Pennsylvania	1916	1924		Lancaster County 519
324	Lancaster County Council	Lincoln	Nebraska	1926	1927		Lincoln 324
519	Lancaster County Council	Lancaster	Pennsylvania	1924	1971	Merged with Lebanon County 650	Lancaster-Lebanon 524
524	Lancaster-Lebanon Council	Lancaster	Pennsylvania	1971	1995	Name changed	Pennsylvania Dutch 524
269	Land O' Lakes Council	Jackson	Michigan	1937	1993	Merged with Wolverine 255	Great Sauk Trail 255
395	Land of The Oneidas Council	Utica	New York	1981	2001	Merged with General Herkimer 400	Revolutionary Trails 400
697	Lane County Council	Eugene	Oregon	1925	1933		Wallamet 697
271	Lansing Council	Lansing	Michigan	1919	1932		Chief Okemos 271
	Laredo Council	Laredo	Texas	1920	1922		Webb County
64	Las Animas County Council	Trinidad	Colorado	1924	1927	Merged with Arkansas Valley 669	Spanish Peaks 64
	Lawrence Council	Lawrence	Kansas	1920	1920		
450	Lawrence County Council	Ironton	Ohio	1923	1929		Scioto County 457
520	Lawrence County Council	New Castle	Pennsylvania	1922	1973	Merged with Pioneer Trails 500	Moraine Trails 500
650	Lebanon County Council	Lebanon	Pennsylvania	1924	1971	Merged with Lancaster County 519	Lancaster-Lebanon 524
729	Lehigh County Council	Allentown	Pennsylvania	1930	1969	Merged with Delaware Valley 510 and Bethlehem Area 498	Minsi Trails 502
	Leighton Council	Leighton	Pennsylvania	1917	1918		
182	Lemars Council	Lemars	Iowa	1920	1926	Merged with Sioux City 185	Sioux City Area 185
339	Lenape Area Council	Ocean City	New Jersey	1929	1932		Atlantic Area 331
	Leonia Council	Leonia	New Jersey	1917	1919		
316	Lewis and Clark Area Council	Helena	Montana	1925	1926		Elkhorn Area 316
599	Lewis & Clark Council (Virginia)	Charlottesville	Virginia	1927	1931		Stonewall Jackson 763
108	Lewis-Clark Area Council	Lewiston	Idaho	1925	1928		Spokane Area 611
108	Lewis-Clark Council	Lewiston	Idaho	1945	1992		Inland Northwest 611
	Lewisburg Council	Lewisburg	Pennsylvania	1920	1923		
108	Lewiston Council	Lewiston	Idaho	1922	1925		Lewis-Clark Area 108
318	Lewiston Council	Lewistown	Montana	1918	1922		Central Montana 318
385	Lewiston Trail Council	Lockport	New York	1937	1994	Merged with Genesee 367	Iroquois Trail 385
204	Lexington Council	Lexington	Kentucky	1917	1929	Merged with Isaac Shelby 202 and Kentucky, Daniel Boone 206	Blue Grass 204
192	Liberal Council	Liberal	Kansas	1922	1925	ended/dissolved/disbanded^{[b]}	
	Libertyville Council	Libertyville	Illinois	1921	1923		
451	Licking County Council	Newark	Ohio	1922	1987		Central Ohio 441
452	Lima Council	Lima	Ohio	1919	1926		Shawnee 452
698	Limestone County Council	Mexia	Texas	1925	1929		Limestone and Freestone Area 698
698	Limestone & Freestone Area Council	Mexia	Texas	1929	1930	Merged with Tr-An-Le-Ho 586	Davey Crockett 586
133	Lincoln Council (Illinois)	Lincoln	Illinois	1921	1923		Logan County 133
324	Lincoln Council (Nebraska)	Lincoln	Nebraska	1917	1926		Lancaster County 324
324	Lincoln Council (Nebraska)	Lincoln	Nebraska	1927	1929		Cornhusker 324
	Lindsay Council	Lindsay	California	1917	1918		Tulare County 56
172	Linn County Council	Cedar Rapids	Iowa	1924	1927		Cedar Rapids Area 172
491	Linn County Council	Albany	Oregon	1922	1924	ended/dissolved/disbanded^{[b]}	
	Lisbon Council	Lisbon	Ohio	1917	1918		
18	Little Rock Council	Little Rock	Arkansas	1916	1919	ended/dissolved/disbanded^{[b]}	
18	Little Rock Council	Little Rock	Arkansas	1920	1923		Pulaski County 18
562	Llano Estacado Council	Amarillo	Texas	1939	1986	Merged with Adobe Walls 569	Golden Spread 562
385	Lockport Area Council	Lockport	New York	1922	1937		Lewiston Trail 385
588	Logan Council	Logan	Utah	1920	1922		Cache Valley 588
133	Logan County Council (Illinois)	Lincoln	Illinois	1923	1935		Prairie Trails 133
756	Logan County Council (West Virginia)	Logan	West Virginia	1926	1930		Logan-Boone Area 756
756	Logan-Boone Area Council	Logan	West Virginia	1930	1935	Merged with Kentucky-West Virginia 626	Logan-Boone-Mingo Area 756
756	Logan-Boone-Mingo Area Council	Logan	West Virginia	1935	1953	Name changed	Cornstalk 756
162	Logansport Council	Logansport	Indiana	1918	1936		Three Rivers 162
31	Loma Prieta District Council	Santa Cruz	California	1922	1926	ended/dissolved/disbanded	Monterey Bay 31
569	Lone Star Area Council	McKinney	Texas	1927	1928		571, 568 and 580
580	Lone Star Area Council	Paris	Texas	1928	1955		Netseo Trails 580
580	Lone Star Council	Paris	Texas	1929	1954		
749	Lone Tree Council	Haverhill	Massachusetts	1926	1993	Merged with North Bay 236 and North Essex 712	Yankee Clipper 236
203	Lonesome Pine Council	Pikeville	Kentucky	1934	1979	Merged part into Blue Grass 204 and part into Chief Cornstalk 756	Blue Grass 204 and Chief Cornstalk 756
32	Long Beach Council	Long Beach	California	1919	1923		Long Beach District 32
32	Long Beach District Council	Long Beach	California	1923	1944		Long Beach Area 32
66	Long Rivers Council	Hartford	Connecticut	1972	1995	Merged with Indian Trails 73	Connecticut Rivers 66
592	Long Trail Council	Burlington	Vermont	1933	1972	Merged with Ethan Allen 593	Green Mountain 592
	Longmont Council	Longmont	Colorado	1917	1919		
689	Longs Peak Council	Boulder	Colorado	1925	1928	Merged with Weld and Morgan Counties 62 and Southeastern Wyoming 639	Longs Peak 62
33	Los Angeles Area Council	Los Angeles	California	1945	2015	Merged with San Gabriel Valley Council 40	Greater Los Angeles Area Council 33
33	Los Angeles Council	Los Angeles	California	1915	1934	Merged with South Pasadena 767 and San Antonio District 46	Los Angeles Metro Area 33
33	Los Angeles Metro. Area Council	Los Angeles	California	1934	1945		Los Angeles Area 33
126	Lost River Area Council	Bedford	Indiana	1927	1931		White River Area 145
381	Louis Agassiz Fuertes Council	Ithaca	New York	1929	1975	Merged with Tioughnioga	Baden-Powell 381
205	Louisville Council	Louisville	Kentucky	1915	1954		Old Kentucky Home 205
238	Lowell Area Council	Lowell	Massachusetts	1912	1926		Greater Lowell 238
338	Lowell Council	Lowell	Massachusetts	1915	1929		Greater Lowell Area 238
775	Lower Rio Grande Valley Council	Mercedes	Texas	1927	1947		Rio Grande 775
34	Luther Burbank Council	Santa Rosa	California	1923	1927	ended/dissolved/disbanded	Napa County 38
543	Lycoming County Council	Williamsport	Pennsylvania	1929	1935		West Branch 543
594	Lynchburg Council	Lynchburg	Virginia	1919	1932		Piedmont Area 594
239	Lynn Council	Lynn	Massachusetts	1919	1936		Bay Shore 239
274	Macomb County Council	Mount Clemens	Michigan	1925	1937	Merged with Oakland Area 276	Clinton Valley 276
96	Macon Council	Macon	Georgia	1919	1923		Central Georgia 96
343	Madison Council	Madison	New Jersey	1919	1924	Merged with Morristown 348	Morris County 343
628	Madison Council	Madison	Wisconsin	1919	1929		Four Lakes 628
389	Madison County Council	Oneida	New York	1923	1968	Merged with Fort Stanwix 398	Iroquois 395
183	Mahaska-Poweshiek-Jasper Counties Council	Oskaloosa	Iowa	1924	1926		Des Moines 177
466	Mahoning Valley Council	Canfield	Ohio	1927	1993	Merged with Ne Ohio 463 and Western Reserve 461	Greater Western Reserve 463
240	Malden Council	Malden	Massachusetts	1920	1933		Quannapowitt 240
	Mamaroneck Council	Mamaroneck	New York	1917	1918		
206	Mammoth Cave Council	Bowling Green	Kentucky	1949	1952	Merged with Western Kentucky Area 200	Audubon 200
330	Manchester Council	Manchester	New Hampshire	1912	1919		
330	Manchester Council	Manchester	New Hampshire	1919	1929		Daniel Webster 330
68	Manchester Township Council	Manchester	Connecticut	1917	1925	ended/dissolved/disbanded^{[b]}	
384	Manhattan Council	New York	New York	1918	1967	Name changed	Greater New York, Manhattan 643
	Manhattan Council	Manhattan	Kansas	1917	1923		
	Manistee Council	Manistee	Michigan	1915	1918		
	Manistique Council	Manistique	Michigan	1923	1924	Merged with Escanaba 261 and Gladstone	Delta and Schoolcraft County 261
625	Manitowoc Council	Manitowoc	Wisconsin	1919	1929		Manitowoc County 625
625	Manitowoc County Council	Manitowoc	Wisconsin	1929	1940		Waumegesako 625
453	Mansfield Council	Mansfield	Ohio	1919	1926		Johnny Appleseed 453
200	Many Waters Council	Owensboro	Kentucky	1994	1994	Name changed	Shawnee Trails 200
627	Marathon & Lincoln Co's Council	Merrill	Wisconsin	1926	1930		Samoset Area 627
10	Maricopa County Council	Phoenix	Arizona	1923	1924		Roosevelt 10
464	Marietta Council	Marietta	Ohio	1917	1922		Washington County 464
626	Marinette Council	Marinette	Wisconsin	1920	1930		Marathon and Lincoln Counties 627
163	Marion City Council	Marion	Indiana	1921	1929		Meshingomesia 163
	Marissa Council	Marissa	Illinois	1917	1918		
241	Marlboro & Framingham Council	Marlboro	Massachusetts	1919	1925		Algonquin 241
261	Marquette Area Council	Marquette	Michigan	1931	1933		Hiawatha Area 261
271	Marquette Council	Marquette	Michigan	1915	1928		
658	Marshall and Tama Counties Council	Marshalltown	Iowa	1924	1925		Central Iowa 658
	Marshall Council	Marshall	Michigan	1917	1918		
	Marshalltown Council	Marshalltown	Iowa	1918	1919		
129	Mascoutah Area Council	Jacksonville	Illinois	1926	1936		Abraham Lincoln 144
173	Mason City Council	Mason City	Iowa	1918	1922		Cerro Gordo County 173
221	Mason-Dixon Council	Hagerstown	Maryland	1956	2023		Shenandoah Area Council 598
850	Massachusetts Bay Federated Council	Boston	Massachusetts	1976	1979	Merger of Boston Council, Cambridge Council, Minuteman Council and North Bay Council; dissolved and original councils reformed	
233	Massasoit Council	Fall River	Massachusetts	1946	1972	Merged with and Cachalot 245	Moby Dick 245
462	Massillon Area Council	Massillon	Ohio	1930	1953		Buckeye Area 462
462	Massillon Council	Massillon	Ohio	1919	1922		Massillon and Tuscarawas County 462
462	Massillon and Tuscarawas County Council	Massillon	Ohio	1922	1923		Tuscarawas and Western Stark Area 462
80	Mattatuck Council	Waterbury	Connecticut	1935	1972	Merged with Middlesex County, Nathan Hale, Tunxis and Charter Oak	Long Rivers 66
102	Maui County Council	Wailuku	Hawaii	1917	2019		Aloha 104
460	Maumee Valley Council	Toledo	Ohio	1925	1929	Merged with Hayes Area 447	Toledo Area 460
75	Mauwehu Council	Ridgefield	Connecticut	1952	1972	Merged with Pomperaug 65 and Alfred W Dater 78	Fairfield County 68
	Mayfield Council	Mayfield	Kentucky	1918	1919		
477	McAlester Council	Mcalester	Oklahoma	1921	1926		Choctaw Area 477
662	McLennan County Council	Waco	Texas	1924	1929		Heart O' Texas 662
	McCook Council	McCook	Nebraska	1917	1919		
207	McCracken County Council	Paducah	Kentucky	1920	1925		Chief Paducah 207
707	McDowell County Council	Welch	West Virginia	1925	1928		Southern West Virginia 707
695	McHenry County Council	Harvard/Woodstock	Illinois	1925	1928		Beloit Area 620
	McIntosh Council	LaGrange	Georgia	1922	1923		
499	McKean County Council	Bradford	Pennsylvania	1924	1926		McKean-Potter Area 499
499	McKean-Potter Area Council	Bradford	Pennsylvania	1926	1936		McKean-Potter-Cameron 499
499	McKean-Potter-Cameron Council	Bradford	Pennsylvania	1930	1947		Elk Lick 499
521	McKeesport & Affiliated Terr. Council	Mckeesport	Pennsylvania	1939	1951		Yohogania 521
521	McKeesport Council	Mckeesport	Pennsylvania	1920	1939		McKeesport and Affiliated Territory 521
436	McKinley Area Council	Canton	Ohio	1932	1958	Merged with Buckeye Area 462	Buckeye 436
506	Meadville Council	Meadville	Pennsylvania	1917	1923		Crawford County 506
242	Medford Council	Medford	Massachusetts	1918	1920	ended/dissolved/disbanded^{[b]}	
242	Medford Council	Medford	Massachusetts	1924	1932		Fellsland 242
491	Medford Council	Medford	Oregon	1924	1925		Crater Lake 491
243	Melrose Council	Melrose	Massachusetts	1920	1924		Malden 240
558	Memphis Council	Memphis	Tennessee	1915	1925		Chickasaw 558
	Menominee County Council	Menominee	Michigan	1920	1924		
	Mercer Council	Mercer	Pennsylvania	1917	1918		
531	Mercer County Council	Sharon/Farrell	Pennsylvania	1927	1969		Custaloga 531
71	Meridian Council	Meridian	Connecticut	1915	1929		Central Connecticut 71
302	Meridian Council	Meridian	Mississippi	1920	1935		Choctaw Area 302
627	Merrill Council	Merrill	Wisconsin	1921	1926	Merged with Wausau 644	Marathon and Lincoln Counties 627
163	Meshingomesia Council	Marion	Indiana	1929	1973	Merged with Harrison Trails 161 and Three Rivers 162	Sagamore 162
174	Mesquakie Area Council	Clinton	Iowa	1937	1958		Buffalo Bill 176
	Miami Council	Miami	Florida	1914	1921		Dade County 84
	Miami Council	Miami	Oklahoma	1921	1921	ended/dissolved/disbanded^{[b]}	
75	Mid Fairfield Council		Connecticut	1935	1951		
501	Mid Valley Council	Peckville	Pennsylvania	1931	1962	Merged with Dan Beard 529	Forest Lakes 501
494	Mid-Columbia Council	The Dalles	Oregon	1925	1929		Mid-Columbia-Deschutes Area 494
494	Mid-Columbia-Deschutes Area Council	The Dalles	Oregon	1930	1934	ended/dissolved/disbanded^{[b]}	Direct Service
75	Mid-Fairfield Council	Norwalk	Connecticut	1935	1952		Mauwehu 75
555	Middle Tennessee Council	Dickson	Tennessee	1928	1930		Nashville Area 560
344	Middlesex Council	Edison	New Jersey	1929	1969	Merged with Raritan 356	Thomas A. Edison 352
674	Middlesex County Council	Middletown	Connecticut	1924	1972	Merged with Mattatuck, Nathan Hale, Tunxis and Charter Oak	Long Rivers 66
454	Middletown Council	Middletown	Ohio	1917	1932		Mound Builders Area 454
273	Midland Council	Midland	Michigan	1922	1926	Merged with Bay City 257	Summer Trails 257
	Midland Council	Midland	Texas	1913	1914		
	Mill Valley Council	Mill Valley	California	1917	1918	Merged with Sausalito	Marin County 35
629	Milwaukee Council	Milwaukee	Wisconsin	1915	1929		Milwaukee County 629
629	Milwaukee County Council	Milwaukee	Wisconsin	1929	2011	Merged with Southeast Wisconsin 634	Three Harbors 636
	Minden Council	Minden	Louisiana	1917	1919		
294	Mineral Area Council	Bonne Terre	Missouri	1930	1939	Divided to (305, 312)	305 and 312
289	Minneapolis Area Council	Minneapolis	Minnesota	1928	1951		Viking 289
289	Minneapolis Council	Minneapolis	Minnesota	1915	1922		Hennepin County 289
284	Minnesota Valley Area Council	Mankato	Minnesota	1927	1969	Merged with Cedar Valley Area 282	Twin Valley 284
431	Minot Council	Minot	North Dakota	1918	1922		Minot District 431
431	Minot District (Area) Council	Minot	North Dakota	1922	1929		Great Plains Area 431
240	Minuteman Council	Stoneham	Massachusetts	1959	1993	Merged with Greater Boston 227	Boston Minuteman 227
250	Minuteman Council	Waltham	Massachusetts	1928	1932		Sachem 223
164	Mishawaka Area Council	Mishawaka	Indiana	1922	1952	Merged with St Joseph Valley 165	TriValley 165
	Mishawum Council	Malden	Massachusetts	1918	1920		
53	Mission Council	Santa Barbara	California	1929	1994	Merged with Santa Lucia 56	Los Padres 53
122	Mississippi Valley Council	East St Louis	Illinois	1936	1965	Merged with Kaskaskia 114	Okaw Valley 116
655	Mississippi-Cape-Scott Council	Cape Girardeau	Missouri	1924	1927	ended/dissolved/disbanded^{[b]}	
666	Mississippi-Gulf Coast Area Council	Biloxi	Mississippi	1924	1929		New Orleans Area 214
320	Missoula Council	Missoula	Montana	1918	1922		Missoula County 320
320	Missoula County Council	Missoula	Montana	1922	1926		Western Montana 320
688	Missouri Pacific Railroad Council		Missouri	1924	1941	Railroad Council, may also be known as Missouri Pacific Extension Council^{[b]}	Direct Service
432	Missouri Valley Council	Bismarck	North Dakota	1929	1974	Merged with Great Plains Area 431, Lake Agassiz 430 and Red River Valley 429	Northern Lights 429
754	Missouri-Kansas-Texas Lines Railroad Council		Missouri	1926	1941	railroad council,^{[b]} |May also be known as T-M-K-T Council or Missouri-Ka-Tx Extension Council	
	Mitchell Council	Mitchell	South Dakota	1917	1920		
572	Mo-Co-Wi-De Council	Gainesville	Texas	1924	1927		Cooke and Denton Area 572
306	Mo-Kan Area Council	Joplin	Missouri	1929	1994	Merged with Ozark 308	Ozark Trails 306
	Moberly Council	Moberly	Missouri	1921	1923		
4	Mobile & Baldwin Counties Council	Mobile	Alabama	1926	1927		Mobile Area 4
4	Mobile Area Council	Mobile	Alabama	1924	1926		Mobile and Baldwin Counties 4
4	Mobile Council	Mobile	Alabama	1919	1924		Mobile Area 4
245	Moby Dick Council	New Bedford	Massachusetts	1971	2001	Merged into Narragansett 546	Narragansett 546
59	Modesto Council	Modesto	California	1920	1921		Stanislaus County 59
494	Modoc Area Council	Klamath Falls	Oregon	1936	1993		Crater Lake 491
677	Mohawk Council	Helena	Arkansas	1926	1930	ended/dissolved/disbanded^{[b]}	
378	Mohican Council	Glens Falls	New York	1927	1998	Merged into Twin Rivers 364	Twin Rivers 364
134	Moline Area Council	Moline	Illinois	1927	1959	Merged with Fort Armstrong Area 142	Sac-N-Fox 134
134	Moline Council	Moline	Illinois	1916	1927		Moline Area 134
523	Mon-Yough Council	Munhall	Pennsylvania	1971	1973	Merged with East Boroughs	East Valley 530
232	Monadnock Council	Gardner	Massachusetts	1924	1993		Nashua Valley 230
347	Monmouth Council	Red Bank	New Jersey	1928	1937		Monmouth-Ocean 347
347	Monmouth County Council	Red Bank	New Jersey	1916	1928		Monmouth 347
347	Monmouth-Ocean Council	Oakhurst	New Jersey	1937	1940		Monmouth 347
516	Monongahela Valley Council	Munhall	Pennsylvania	1952	1971	Merged with Yohogania 521	Mon-Yough 523
522	Monongahela Valley Council	Monessen	Pennsylvania	1923	1926	ended/dissolved/disbanded^{[b]}	
346	Montclair Council	Montclair	New Jersey	1913	1931		Eagle Rock 346
25	Monterey Bay Area Council	Salinas	California	1933	2012	Merged with Santa Clara County	Silicon Valley Monterey Bay Council
31	Monterey Bay Council	Santa Cruz	California	1926	1927		Santa Clara 55
5	Montgomery Council	Montgomery	Alabama	1919	1923	Name changed	Montgomery County 5
5	Montgomery Council	Montgomery	Alabama	1930	1946	Name changed	Tukabatchee Area 5
5	Montgomery County Council	Montgomery	Alabama	1923	1930	Name changed	Montgomery 5
193	Montgomery County Council	Independence	Kansas	1923	1926		Independence 193
361	Montgomery County Council	Amsterdam	New York	1930	1935		Sir Williams Johnson 377 1937
129	Morgan County Council	Jacksonville	Illinois	1924	1926		Mascoutah 129
	Morgantown Council	Morgantown	West Virginia	1921	1923		
343	Morris & Sussex Area Council	Morristown	New Jersey	1925	1928		Morris Area 343
343	Morris Area Council	Morristown	New Jersey	1928	1936		Morris-Sussex 343
	Morris Council	Morris	Illinois	1917	1920		
343	Morris County Council	Morristown	New Jersey	1924	1925		Morris and Sussex Area 343
343	Morris-Sussex Council	Denville	New Jersey	1936	1999	Merged with Watchung Area 358	Patriots Path
348	Morristown Council	Morristown	New Jersey	1917	1924	Merged with Madison 343	Morris County 343
454	Mound Builders Area Council	Middletown	Ohio	1932	1985		Dan Beard 438
603	Mount Baker Area Council	Bellingham	Washington	1929	1994	Merged with Evergreen 606	Mount Baker 606
	Mount Carmel Council	Mount Carmel	Pennsylvania	1917	1923		
	Mount Carmel Council	Mount Carmel	Illinois	1921	1923		
274	Mount Clemens Council	Mount Clemens	Michigan	1922	1925		Macomb County 274
23	Mount Diablo Council	Walnut Creek	California	1951	1992	Merged with Silverado Area 38	Mount Diablo-Silverado 23
23	Mount Diablo Silverado Council	Walnut Creek	California	1992	2020	Merged with San Francisco Bay Area Council 028	Golden Gate Area Council 028
36	Mount Lassen Area Council	Chico	California	1924	1992	Merged with Golden Empire 47 and Buttes Area 647	Golden Empire 47
577	Mount Pleasant Council	Mount Pleasant	Texas	1920	1924		
612	Mount Rainier Council	Tacoma	Washington	1948	1993	Merged with Twin Harbors 607	Pacific Harbors 612
704	Mount Saint Helens Council	Vancouver	Washington	1925	1932		Portland Area Council 492
37	Mount Shasta Area Council	Dunsmuir/Reading	California	1923	1926		Mount Lassen 36
236	Mount Tom Council	Holyoke	Massachusetts	1949	1960	Merged with Hampden County 234	Pioneer Valley 234
370	Mount Vernon Council	Mount Vernon	New York	1915	1923	Merged with Bronxville	Bronx Valley 370
54	Mount Whitney Area Council	Visalia	California	1929	1992		Sequoia 27
105	Mountainview Council	Boise	Idaho	1951	1968		Ore-Ida 106
227	Municipal Boston Council	Boston	Massachusetts	1918	1921		Boston 227
135	Murphysboro Council	Murphysboro	Illinois	1924	1925		John A. Logan 135
264	Muscadawin Area Council	Flint	Michigan	1927	1937		Tall Pine 264
668	Muscle Shoals Council	Sheffield	Alabama	1924	1928	Merged into Tennessee Valley 659	Tennessee Valley 659
98	Muscogee County Council	Columbus	Georgia	1923	1925		Columbus Area 98
552	Musgrove Council	Newberry	South Carolina	1924	1927	ended/dissolved/disbanded^{[b]}	
275	Muskegon Area Council	Muskegon	Michigan	1927	1944		Timber Trails 275
275	Muskegon Council	Muskegon	Michigan	1915	1927		Muskegon Area 275
467	Muskingum County Council	Zanesville	Ohio	1923	1929		Zane Trace 467
478	Muskogee Area Council	Muskogee	Oklahoma	1927	1949		Eastern Oklahoma 478
478	Muskogee Council	Muskogee	Oklahoma	1917	1927		Muskogee Area 478
	Mystic Valley Council	Winchester	Massachusetts	1918	1920		
	Nacogdoches Council	Nacogdoches	Texas	1919	1920		
38	Napa Council	Napa	California	1917	1922		Napa County 38
38	Napa County Council	Napa	California	1922	1928		Silverado Area 38
560	Nashville Area Council	Nashville	Tennessee	1929	1949		Middle Tennessee 560
560	Nashville Council	Nashville	Tennessee	1920	1929		Nashville Area 560
386	Nassau County Council	Roslyn	New York	1916	1997	Name changed	Theodore Roosevelt 386
73	Nathan Hale Council	New Britain	Connecticut	1967	1972	Merged with Middlesex County, Mattatuck, Tunxis and Charter Oak	Long Rivers 66
999	National Office Council	New York	New York	1910	1954	Moved to New Brunswick, NJ	
999	National Office Council	New Brunswick	New Jersey	1954	1979	Moved to Irving, Texas	
619	National Trail Council	Wheeling	West Virginia	1966	1991	Merged with Fort Steuben Area 459	Ohio River Valley 619
139	National Trails Council	Vandalia	Illinois	1927	1931	ended/dissolved/disbanded^{[b]}	
72	Naugatuck Council	Naugatuck	Connecticut	1917	1935	Merged with Waterbury 80	Mattatuck 80
476	Navajo Mountain Area Council	Altus	Oklahoma	1925	1930	Merged with Grady County 471	Black Beaver 471
676	Navarro County Council	Corsicana	Texas	1924	1927	Merged with Dallas County 571	Circle Ten 571
325	Nebraska Panhandle Area Council	Scottsbluff	Nebraska	1929	1935		Scottsbluff Area 325
244	Needham Council	Needham	Massachusetts	1922	1928	Merged with Inter-City 727	Boston 227
	Neenah-Menasha Council	Neenah	Wisconsin	1920	1922	Merged with Appleton	Valley 635
720	Nemacolin Trails Council	Washington	Pennsylvania	1964	1967	Merged with Allegheny 527	Allegheny Trails 527
743	Nemaha Council	Nebraska City	Nebraska	1926	1932		Cornhusker 324
580	NeTseO Trails Council	Paris	Texas	1929	2017	Merged into Circle Ten 571	Circle Ten 571
415	Neuse Council	Kingston	North Carolina	1928	1930		Wilson County 426
245	New Bedford and Fairhaven Council	New Bedford	Massachusetts	1924	1926		New Bedford 245
245	New Bedford Council	New Bedford	Massachusetts	1916	1924		New Bedford and Fairhaven 245
245	New Bedford Council	New Bedford	Massachusetts	1926	1933		New Bedford and Fairhaven Area 245
245	New Bedford & Fairhaven Area Council	New Bedford	Massachusetts	1933	1935		Cachalot 245
73	New Britain Area Council	New Britain	Connecticut	1916	1953		Keemosahbee 73
344	New Brunswick Council	New Brunswick	New Jersey	1916	1929		Middlesex 344
425	New Hanover County Council	Wilmington	North Carolina	1926	1930		Cape Fear Area 425
74	New Haven Area Council	New Haven	Connecticut	1921	1929		Southern New Haven County 74
74	New Haven Council	New Haven	Connecticut	1913	1921		New Haven Area 74
77	New London Council	New London	Connecticut	1917	1923		South New London County 77
77	New London Council	New London	Connecticut	1929	1935		Pequot 77
214	New Orleans Area Council	Metairie	Louisiana	1927	1999	Name changed	Southeast Louisiana 214
214	New Orleans Council	New Orleans	Louisiana	1916	1927		New Orleans Area 214
291	New Prague Council	New Prague	Minnesota	1921	1925	Merged with Northfield 292 and Faribault 288	Rice-Scott-Le Seur Area 288
615	New River District Council	Beckley	West Virginia	1923	1924	ended/dissolved/disbanded^{[b]}	
	New Rochelle Council	New Rochelle	New York	1918	1920		Westchester County
349	Newark Council	Newark	New Jersey	1915	1933		Robert Treat 349
451	Newark Council	Newark	Ohio	1919	1922		Licking County 451
547	Newport Council	Newport	Rhode Island	1922	1924		Newport County 546
	Newport Council	Newport	Rhode Island	1918	1919		
547	Newport County Council	Newport	Rhode Island	1924	1926	ended/dissolved/disbanded^{[b]}	
595	Newport News Council	Newport News	Virginia	1918	1929		Peninsula 595
778	Newton City Council	Newton	Iowa	1927	1929		Tri-Valley 778
108	Nez Perce County Council	Lewiston	Idaho	1919	1922		Lewiston 108
387	Niagara Falls Area Council	Niagara Falls	New York	1925	1944		Niagara Frontier 387
387	Niagara Falls Council	Niagara Falls	New York	1917	1925		Niagara Falls Area 387
387	Niagara Frontier Council	Niagara Falls	New York	1944	1967	Merged with Buffalo Area 380	Greater Niagara Frontier 380
385	Niagara County Council	Lockport	New York	1920	1922		Lockport Area 385
621	Nicolet Area Council	Green Bay	Wisconsin	1934	1973	Merged with Badger 622, Waumegesako 625, Valley 635, Twin Lakes 630 and Kettle Moraine 632	Bay Lakes 635
483	Noble-Kay Counties Council	Ponca City	Oklahoma	1926	1929		Northern Oklahoma 483
596	Norfolk Council	Norfolk	Virginia	1911	1935	Name changed	Tidewater 596
479	Norman Council	Norman	Oklahoma	1920	1927		Oklahoma City 480
	North Adams Council	North Adams	Massachusetts	1917	1919		
236	North Bay Council	Danvers	Massachusetts	1966	1993	Merged with Lone Tree 749 and North Essex 712	Lone Tree 749 and Yankee Clipper 236
350	North Bergen County Council	Hackensack	New Jersey	1921	1969		Bergen 350
523	North Boroughs Council		Pennsylvania	1922	1925	ended/dissolved/disbanded^{[b]}	
315	North Central Montana Council	Great Falls	Montana	1929	1974	Merged with Yellowstone Valley 318	Montana 315
613	North Central Washington Council	Wenatchee	Washington	1924	1992	Merged with Fort Simcoe Area 614	Grand Columbia 614
455	North Columbia County Council	Salem	Ohio	1923	1926		Columbiana County 455
712	North Essex Council	Lawrence	Massachusetts	1925	1993	Merged with North Bay 236 and Lone Tree 749	Lone Tree 749 and Yankee Clipper 236
351	North Hudson Council	Union City	New Jersey	1919	1936		Alexander Hamilton 351
173	North Iowa Council	Mason City	Iowa	1928	1939		Winnebago 173
188	North Kansas Area Council	Concordia	Kansas	1925	1927	ended/dissolved/disbanded^{[b]}	
667	North Missouri Council	Chillicothe	Missouri	1924	1927	Merged with Saint Joseph 311	Saint Joseph Area 311
76	North New London County Council	Norwich	Connecticut	1922	1929		Eastern Connecticut 76
37	North Orange Council	Anaheim	California	1965	1972	Merged with Orange Empire Area 39	Orange County 39
325	North Platte Council	North Platte	Nebraska	1920	1926	ended/dissolved/disbanded^{[b]}	
714	North Shore Area Council	Highland Park	Illinois	1926	1968	Merged with Evanston 124	Evanston-Northshore Area 129
701	North Shore Council	Salem	Massachusetts	1925	1966	Merged with Bay Shore 239	North Bay 236
286	North Star Council	Duluth	Minnesota	1936	1959	Merged with Gitche Gumee 634	Lake Superior 286
	Northampton Council	Northampton	Massachusetts	1917	1918		
101	Northeast Georgia Council	Athens	Georgia	1922	1931		Gainesville Area 428
307	Northeast Missouri Council	Moberly	Missouri	1925	1927		
463	Northeast Ohio Council	Painesville	Ohio	1929	1993	Merged with Mahoning Valley 466 and Western Reserve 461	Greater Western Reserve 463
3	Northeastern Alabama Council	Gadsden	Alabama	1925	1933	Merged into Choccolocco 1	Choccolocco 1
566	Northeastern Oklahoma Council	Miami	Oklahoma	1927	1929		Cherokee Area 469
12	Northern Arizona Council	Prescott	Arizona	1929	1934	ended/dissolved/disbanded^{[b]}	Direct Service
165	Northern Indiana Council	South Bend	Indiana	1973	1991	Merged with Sawasabee District, Southwest Michigan 270	La Salle 165
201	Northern Kentucky Council	Covington	Kentucky	1925	1952		Dan Beard 201
79	Northern Litchfield Council	Torrington	Connecticut	1929	1947		Tunxis 79
273	Northern Michigan Council	Traverse City	Michigan	1928	1930		Pere Marquette Area 721
412	Northern New Mexico Council	Albuquerque	New Mexico	1934	1955		Kit Carson 412
483	Northern Oklahoma Council	Ponca City	Oklahoma	1929	1930	ended/dissolved/disbanded^{[b]}	
483	Northern Oklahoma Council	Ponca City	Oklahoma	1936	1948	Merged with Cimarron Valley Area 473	Will Rogers 473
37	Northern Orange County Council	Anaheim	California	1944	1965		North Orange 37
703	Northern South Dakota Council	Aberdeen	South Dakota	1928	1931		Dasota 703
292	Northfield Council	Northfield	Minnesota	1916	1925	Merged with New Prague 291 and Faribault 288	Rice-Scott-Le Sueur Area 288
16	Northwest Arkansas Council	Fort Smith	Arkansas	1929	1930		Fort Smith Area 16
570	Northwest Oklahoma Council	Woodward	Oklahoma	1927	1928	Merged with Garfield County 474	Great Salt Plains 474
751	Northwest Suburban Council	Mount Prospect	Illinois		2014	Merged with Calumet Council, Chicago Area Council, Des Plaines Valley Council	Pathway to Adventure Council
	Norton County Council	Norton	Kansas	1919	1920		
246	Norumbega Council	Waban	Massachusetts	1918	1996	Merged with Algonquin 241	Knox Trail 244
75	Norwalk Council	Norwalk	Connecticut	1917	1932		Central Fairfield 75
76	Norwich Council	Norwich	Connecticut	1917	1922		North New London County 77
388	Norwich Council	Norwich	New York	1921	1924		Binghamton 368
	Norwood Council	Norwood	Massachusetts	1917	1919		
256	Nottawa Trails Council	Battle Creek	Michigan	1953	1973	Merged with Fruit Belt Area 270 and Southwestern Michigan 258	Southwest Michigan 270
577	Nueces Valley Council	Corpus Christi	Texas	1924	1929		Gulf Coast 577
352	Nutley Council	Nutley	New Jersey	1917	1929	Merged with Bloomfield 333	Bloomfield-Nutley 333
136	Oak Park Area Council	Oak Park	Illinois	1932	1941		Thatcher Woods Area 136
136	Oak Park Council	Oak Park	Illinois	1915	1932		Oak Park Area 136
126	Oak Plain Council	Waukegan	Illinois	1940	1971	Merged with Evanston-Northshore Area 129	Northeast Illinois 129
21	Oakland-Piedmont Council	Oakland	California	1916	1921	Split to become Oakland Area Council and Piedmont Council (#042)	San Francisco Bay Area 28
21	Oakland Area Council	Oakland	California	1921	1964	Merged with San Francisco Area 51	San Francisco Bay Area 28
276	Oakland Area Council	Pontiac	Michigan	1929	1936	Merged with Macomb County 274	Clinton Valley 276
21	Oakland Council	Oakland	California	1916	1921		Oakland Area Council 21
	Ocean City Council	Ocean City	New Jersey	1919	1921		
341	Ocean County Council	Toms River	New Jersey	1940	1992	Merged with Atlantic Area 331	Jersey Shore 341
88	Ocklawaha Council	Gainesville	Florida	1924	1930		Greater Jacksonville Area 87
101	Ococah Council	Ococah	Georgia	1922	1924		
	Oconomowoc Council	Oconomowoc	Wisconsin	1917	1921		
	Oelwein Council	Oelwein	Iowa	1918	1918		
589	Ogden Area Council	Ogden	Utah	1934	1951		Lake Bonneville 589
589	Ogden Council	Ogden	Utah	1919	1923		Ogden Gateway 589
589	Ogden Gateway Area Council	Ogden	Utah	1927	1934		Ogden Area 589
589	Ogden Gateway Council	Ogden	Utah	1923	1927		Ogden Gateway Area 589
524	Ohio Valley Council		Pennsylvania	1921	1925	From Allegheny County 1-1-21	
774	Oil Belt Council	Eastland	Texas	1929	1932	Merged with Pecan Valley 479	Comanche Trail 479
537	Oil City Council	Oil City	Pennsylvania	1915	1922		Venango County 537
621	Ojibwa Council	Eau Claire	Wisconsin	1925	1928	ended/dissolved/disbanded^{[b]}	
116	Okaw Valley Council	Belleville	Illinois	1965	2009	Merged with Trails West 112 to Form Lewis and Clark 114	
	Okefenokee Council	11th Congressional District	Georgia	1921	1922		
	Okefenokee Area Council		Georgia		March 1, 2014	Merged with Coastal Empire Council	Coastal Georgia Council
480	Oklahoma City Council	Oklahoma City	Oklahoma	1917	1928	Merged with Ca-Bla-Ki 475	Oklahoma County 480
480	Oklahoma County Council	Oklahoma City	Oklahoma	1928	1930		Central Oklahoma 480
481	Okmulgee Council	Okmulgee	Oklahoma	1919	1927		Okmulgee County 481
43	Old Baldy Council	Ontario	California	1921	2006	Split Between San Gabriel Valley and Ca Inland Empire	
247	Old Colony Council	East Walpole	Massachusetts	1914	1969	Merged with Squanto 228	Old Colony 249
249	Old Colony Council	Canton	Massachusetts	1969	2017	Merged with Knox Trail 244	Mayflower 251
601	Old Dominion Area Council	Suffolk	Virginia	1927	1992	Merged with Peninsula 595	Colonial Virginia 595
657	Old Hickory Area Council	Bogalusa	Louisiana	1924	1931		New Orleans Area 214
205	Old Kentucky Home Council	Louisville	Kentucky	1954	1993	Merged with George Rodgers Clark 143	Lincoln Heritage 205
	Old Town Council	Old Town	Maine	1919	1920		
	Olean Council	Olean	New York	1917	1918		
605	Olympic Area Council	Bremerton	Washington	1956	1974		Chief Seattle 609
326	Omaha Council	Omaha	Nebraska	1915	1930		Covered Wagon 326
389	Oneida Council	Oneida	New York	1922	1923		Madison County 389
	Oneida County Council	Rhinelander	Wisconsin	1919	1922		Rhinelander
393	Oneonta Council	Oneonta	New York	1921	1924		Otsego and Schoharie Counties 393
390	Onondaga Cortland Council	Syracuse	New York	1929	1940		Onondaga 390
390	Onondaga Council	Syracuse	New York	1940	1969	Merged with Oswego County 365	Hiawatha 373
390	Onondaga County Council	Syracuse	New York	1923	1929		Onondaga-Cortland 390
391	Ontario County Council	Geneva	New York	1917	1924	Name changed	Finger Lakes 391
353	Orange Council	Orange	New Jersey	1917	1933	Merged with East Orange 337, Orange Mountain 345 and West Orange 363	Oranges and Maplewood Area 337
	Orange Council	Orange	Massachusetts	1917	1918		
39	Orange County Council	Santa Ana	California	1920	1944		Orange Empire Area 039
392	Orange County Council	Middletown	New York	1922	1931		Orange-Sullivan 392
578	Orange County Council	Orange	Texas	1921	1929	Merged with Port Arthur 581	Sabine Area 578
39	Orange Empire Area Council	Santa Ana	California	1944	1972	Merged with North Orange 37	Orange County 39
337	Orange Mountain Council	Orange	New Jersey	1949	1976	Merged with Robert Treat and Eagle Rock	Essex 336
345	Orange Mountain Council	Orange	New Jersey	1919	1933	Merged with East Orange 337, Orange 353 and West Orange 363	Oranges and Maplewood Area 337
392	Orange-Sullivan Council	Middletown	New York	1931	1958		Hudson-Delaware 392
337	Oranges & Maplewood Area Council	Orange	New Jersey	1933	1949		Orange Mountain 337
106	Oregon-Idaho Area Council	Nampa	Idaho	1929	1933		Ore-Ida 106
106	Ore-Ida Council	Boise	Idaho	1933	2020	Merged with Snake River 106	Mountain West 106
482	Osage and Pawnee Counties Area Council	Pawhuska	Oklahoma	1925	1926		Pawhuska 482
482	Osage County Council	Pawhuska	Oklahoma	1923	1925		Osage and Pawnee Counties 482
771	Osceola Council	Saint Augustine	Florida	1927	1929		Greater Jacksonville Area 87
630	Oshkosh Council	Oshkosh	Wisconsin	1919	1935		Twin Lakes 630
365	Oswego County Council	Oswego	New York	1927	1969	Merged with Onondaga 390	Hiawatha 373
	Oswego County Council	Oswego	New York	1919	1920		
397	Otetiana Council	Rochester	New York	1943	2009	Merged with Finger Lakes 391	Seneca Waterways 397
393	Otschodela Council	Oneota	New York	1927	2016	Merged with Revolutionary Trails 400	Leatherstocking 400
393	Otsego-Schoharie Area Council	Oneonta	New York	1925	1927		Otschodela 393
393	Otsego & Schoharie Co's Council	Oneonta	New York	1924	1925		Otsego-Schoharie Area 393
137	Ottawa Council	Ottawa	Illinois	1924	1929	ended/dissolved/disbanded^{[b]}	
	Ottawa Council	Ottawa	Kansas	1922	1924		
717	Ottawa County Council	Holland	Michigan	1925	1929		Ottawa-Allegan 717
717	Ottawa County Council	Holland	Michigan	1934	1936		Ottawa-Allegan 717
717	Ottawa-Allegan Council	Holland	Michigan	1929	1934		Ottawa County 717
717	Ottawa-Allegan Council	Holland	Michigan	1936	1949		Grand Valley 266
194	Ottumwa Council	Ottumwa	Iowa	1919	1928		Southern Iowa Area 184
14	Ouachita Area Council	Hot Springs	Arkansas	1925	2011	Merged into Quapaw Area 18	Quapaw Area 18
213	Ouachita Valley Council	Monroe	Louisiana	1925	2003	Merged with Attakapas 208	Louisiana Purchase 213
322	Overland Trails Council		Nebraska		2024	Merged with Mid-America Council 326	
762	Owl Council	Montpelier	Vermont	1926	1930	Merged with Rutland County 593	Green Mountain 593
219	Oxford County Council	South Paris	Maine	1920	1924		Cumberland 218 1929
753	Ozark Council	Rogers	Arkansas	1926	1928	Merged with Fort Smith-Van Buren 16	Northwest Arkansas 16
308	Ozarks Council	Springfield	Missouri	1966	1994	Merged with Mo-Kan 306	Mo-Kan Area 306 and Ozark Trails 306
308	Ozarks Empire Area Council	Springfield	Missouri	1941	1966		Ozarks 308
207	Paducah Council	Paducah	Kentucky	1917	1920		McCracken County 207
85	Palm Beach County Council	Palm Beach	Florida	1925	1937		Gulf Stream 85
608	Palouse Council	Pullman	Washington	1921	1925		Direct Service
686	Pamptico Council	Greenville	North Carolina	1924	1927		Wilson County 426
801	Panama Canal Council	Balboa	PC	1979	1988		Direct Service
801	Panama Canal Zone Council	Balboa	CZ	1929	1933		Canal Zone 801
562	Panhandle Area Council	Amarillo	Texas	1925	1928		Amarillo Area 562
665	Pans Council	Paris	Illinois	1924	1927		Tuckabackee 665
580	Paris Council	Paris	Texas	1918	1925		Lamar County 580
	Paris Council	Paris	Illinois	1917	1918		
319	Park and Sweetgrass Counties Council	Livingston	Montana	1923	1924		Yellowstone Area 319
319	Park County Council	Livingston	Montana	1920	1923		Park and Sweetgrass Counties 319
294	Park Region Area Council	Fergus Falls	Minnesota	1923	1930		Red River Valley 429
618	Parkersburg Council	Parkersburg	West Virginia	1919	1933		Kootaga Area 618
194	Parsons Council	Parsons	Kansas	1921	1932		Sekan Area 193
40	Pasadena Council	Pasadena	California	1919	1929		Pasadena-San Gabriel Valley 40
40	Pasadena-San Gabriel Valley Council	Pasadena	California	1929	1951		San Gabriel Valley 40
354	Passaic Council	Passaic	New Jersey	1918	1939		Aheka 354
353	Passaic Valley Council	Wayne	New Jersey	1973	1998	Merged with Bergen 350, Essex 336 and Hudson Liberty 348	Northern New Jersey
	Patchogue Council	Patchogue	New York	1919	1919		Suffolk County 404
355	Paterson Area Council	Paterson	New Jersey	1927	1942		Alhtaha 355
355	Paterson Council	Paterson	New Jersey	1915	1927		Paterson Area 355
742	Patrick Henry Council	Danville	Virginia	1926	1931		Lynchburg 594
259	Paul Bunyan Council	Midland	Michigan	1951	1971	Merged with Saginaw Bay and 1/2 Scenic Trails	Lake Huron Area 265
482	Pawhuska Council	Pawhuska	Oklahoma	1922	1923		Osage County 482
482	Pawhuska Council	Pawhuska	Oklahoma	1926	1927		Cherokee Area 469
327	Pawnee Council	Fremont	Nebraska	1923	1928	ended/dissolved/disbanded^{[b]}	
548	Pawtucket Council	Pawtucket	Rhode Island	1917	1920	ended/dissolved/disbanded^{[b]}	
548	Pawtucket & Central Falls Council	Pawtucket	Rhode Island	1922	1930	Merged with Greater Providence Area 546 and Woonsocket 549	Narragansett 546
479	Pecan Valley Council	Brownwood	Texas	1928	1932	Merged with Oil Belt 774	Comanche Trail 479
413	Pecos Valley Council	Roswell	New Mexico	1924	1925		Eastern New Mexico 413
552	Pee Dee Area Council	Florence	South Carolina	1928	2022	Merged into Indian Waters 553	Indian Waters 553
	Peekskill Council	Peekskill	New York	1918	1919		
643	Peking, China Council	Peking	CH	1923	1929		Peking China 802
802	Peking, China Council	Peking	CH	1929	1931	ended/dissolved/disbanded^{[b]}	
595	Peninsula Council	Newport News	Virginia	1929	1992	Merged with Old Dominion Area 601	Colonial Virginia 595
522	Penn Mountains Council	Wilkes-Barre	Pennsylvania	1970	1990	Merged with Forest Lakes 501	Northeastern Pennsylvania 501
508	Penn's Woods Council	Ebensburg	Pennsylvania	1970	2011	Merged with Greater Pittsburgh 527	Laurel Highlands 527
203	Penny Royal Council	Hopkinsville	Kentucky	1925	1930		Louisville 205
216	Penobscot Council	Bangor	Maine	1925	1929		Katahdin Area 216
	Pensacola Council	Pensacola	Florida	1914	1916		
138	Peoria Council	Peoria	Illinois	1918	1929	Merged with Tazewell County 734	Creve Coeur 138
77	Pequot Council	New London	Connecticut	1935	1972	Merged with Eastern Connecticut 76	Indian Trails 73
721	Pere Marquette Area Council	Ludington	Michigan	1925	1934		Timber Trails 275
740	Pershing Council	Kirksville	Missouri	1928	1930		Central Missouri 653
356	Perth Amboy Council	Perth Amboy	New Jersey	1919	1927		Raritan 356
139	Peru & Peru Township Council	Peru	Illinois	1924	1926	Merged with La Salle and Oglesby 132	Starved Rock Area 132
41	Petaluma Area Council	Petaluma	California	1919	1944		Sonoma-Mendocino 41
	Petersburg Council	Petersburg	Virginia	1915	1919		
310	Pettis County Council	Sedalia	Missouri	1922	1928		Sedalia Area 310
693	Pheasant Council	Huron	South Dakota	1942	1978		Sioux Area 733
525	Philadelphia Council	Philadelphia	Pennsylvania	1914	1996	Name changed	Cradle of Liberty 525
545	Philippine Islands Council	Manila	Philippine Islands	1923	1937	ended/dissolved/disbanded^{[b]}	
526	Phillipsburg & Affiliated Terr. Council	Phillipsburg	Pennsylvania	1925	1926	ended/dissolved/disbanded^{[b]}	
526	Phillipsburg Council	Phillipsburg	Pennsylvania	1919	1925		Phillipsburg and Affiliated Terr. 526
10	Phoenix Council	Phoenix	Arizona	1921	1923		Maricopa County 10
739	Piankeshaw Council	Danville	Illinois	1926	1991	Merged with Arrowhead	Illiana 117
112	Piasa Bird Council	Alton	Illinois	1930	1991	Merged with Cahokia Mound 128	Trails West 112
	Pickaway County Council	Circleville	Ohio	1919	1921		
594	Piedmont Area Council	Lynchburg	Virginia	1932	1972	Merged with Blue Ridge 600	Blue Ridge Mountains 599
612	Pierce County Council	Tacoma	Washington	1924	1927		Tacoma Area 612
60	Pikes Peak Council	Colorado Springs	Colorado	1925	2021	Merged with Rocky Mountain 63	Pathway to the Rockies 60
675	Pinckney Council	Union	South Carolina	1924	1927	Merged with Spartanburg County 554	Spartanburg Area 554
304	Pine Burr-Hattiesburg Area Council	Hattiesburg	Mississippi	1927	1935		Pine Burr Area 304
585	Pine Tree Area Council	Marshall	Texas	1928	1931	Merged with Davey Crockett 586 and Tejas 472	East Texas Area 585
710	Pine Tree Council	Portland	Maine	1925	1929		Cumberland County 218
89	Pinellas Area Council	Seminole	Florida	1970	1978	Name changed	West Central Florida 89
89	Pinellas Council	Saint Petersburg	Florida	1930	1970		Pinellas Area 89
89	Pinellas County Council	Saint Petersburg	Florida	1916	1930		Pinellas 89
155	Pioneer Trails Council	Elkhart	Indiana	1935	1972	Merged with Tri-Valley 165 and Pottawattomie 731	Northern Indiana 165
500	Pioneer Trails Council	Butler	Pennsylvania	1949	1973	Merged with Lawrence County 520	Moraine Trails 500
234	Pioneer Valley Council	Chicopee	Massachusetts	1960	2008	Merged with Great Trails 243	Western Massachusetts 234
456	Piqua Council	Piqua	Ohio	1920	1929	Merged with Dayton 444	Dayton-Miami Valley 444
195	Pittsburg Council	Pittsburg	Kansas	1918	1926		Sekan Area 744
477	Pittsburg County Council	McAlester	Oklahoma	1920	1921		McAlester 477
527	Pittsburgh Council	Pittsburgh	Pennsylvania	1921	1928	Merged with South Hills 532	Allegheny County, West 527
226	Pittsfield Council	Pittsfield	Massachusetts	1915	1922		Southern Berkshire County 226
358	Plainfield Council	Plainfield	New Jersey	1915	1926		Watchung Area 358
663	Platte Valley Council	Scottsbluff	Nebraska	1924	1926		Tri-City 663
	Pleasantville Council	Pleasantville	New Jersey	1917	1918		
	Pleasantville Council	Pleasantville	New Jersey	1921	1924		
	Plymouth Council	Plymouth	Massachusetts	1920	1920		
109	Pocatello Council	Pocatello	Idaho	1919	1925		Eastern Idaho 109
159	Pokagon Council	Hammond	Indiana	1937	1944	Merged with Pottawattomi Trails 119	Pokagon Trails 159
159	Pokagon Trails Council	Hammond	Indiana	1944	1965	Merged with Sauk Trails 158	Calumet 152
177	Polk and Jasper Counties Council	Des Moines	Iowa	1926	1927		Des Moines Area 177
90	Polk County Council	Lakeland	Florida	1925	1926		Lakeland 90
43	Pomona Council	Pomona	California	1917	1921		Old Baldy 43
65	Pomperaug Council	Bridgeport	Connecticut	1936	1972	Merged with Mauwehu 75 and Alfred W Dater 78	Fairfield County 68
483	Ponca Area Council	Ponca City	Oklahoma	1931	1936		Northern Oklahoma 483
483	Ponca City Council	Ponca City	Oklahoma	1921	1926		Noble-Kay Counties 483
276	Pontiac Council	Pontiac	Michigan	1917	1928		Oakland Area 276
484	Pontotoc County Council	Ada	Oklahoma	1920	1945	Merged with Chickasaw 468	Arbuckle Area 468
	Port Angeles Council	Port Angel	Washington	1918	1919		
581	Port Arthur Council	Port Arthur	Texas	1919	1929	Merged with Orange County 578	Sabine Area 578
277	Port Huron Council	Port Huron	Michigan	1919	1929		Saint Clair Area 277
255	Portage Trails Council	Ann Arbor	Michigan	1951	1973	Merged with Wolverine 711	Wolverine 255
492	Portland Area Council	Portland	Oregon	1925	1966	Name changed	Columbia Pacific 492
218	Portland Council	Portland	Maine	1919	1922		Cumberland County 218
492	Portland Council	Portland	Oregon	1914	1929		Portland Area 492
597	Portsmouth Area Council	Portsmouth	Virginia	1924	1930		Norfolk 596
457	Portsmouth Council	Portsmouth	Ohio	1915	1923		Scioto County 457
597	Portsmouth	Portsmouth	Virginia	1916	1924		Portsmouth Area 597
	Portsmouth Council	Portsmouth	New Hampshire	1916	1917		
119	Potawatomi Area Council	Chicago Heights	Illinois	1925	1932		Direct Service
119	Potawattomi Trails Council	Harvey	Illinois	1937	1944	Merged with Pokagon 159	Pokagon Trails 159
485	Pottawatomie Council	Shawnee	Oklahoma	1922	1927		Canadian Valley 485
731	Potomac Council	Cumberland	Maryland	1938	2014	Merged into Laurel Highlands Council	Laurel Highlands Council
	Poughkeepsie Council	Poughkeepsie	New York	1917	1919		Dutchess County 374
321	Powder River Area Council	Miles City	Montana	1924	1926	ended/dissolved/disbanded^{[b]}	Direct Service
125	Prairie Area Council	Galesburg	Illinois	1940	1941		Prairie 125
125	Prairie Council	Galesburg	Illinois	1941	1993		Illowa 133
179	Prairie Gold Area Council	Sioux City	Iowa	1942	2005	Merged into Mid-America 326	
133	Prairie Trails Council	Lincoln	Illinois	1935	1937		Corn Belt 115
12	Prescott Council	Prescott	Arizona	1915	1921		Yavapai District 12
140	Princeton Council	Princeton	Illinois	1922	1929		Kewanee Area 131
357	Princeton Council	Princeton	New Jersey	1918	1925	Merged with Trenton 362	Trenton Area 362
546	Providence Council	Providence	Rhode Island	1916	1926		Greater Providence Area 546
63	Pueblo Council	Pueblo	Colorado	1920	1928		Rocky Mountain 63
661	Puerto Rico Council	Puerto Rico	Puerto Rico	1925	1926		San Juan 661
661	Puerto Rico Council	San Juan	Puerto Rico	1929	1960		Puerto Rico-Virgin Islands 661
661	Puerto Rico-Virgin Islands Council	San Juan	Puerto Rico	1960	1965		Puerto Rico 661 Or Virgin Islands 410
598	Pulaski Council	Pulaski	Virginia	1921	1926		
18	Pulaski County Council	Little Rock	Arkansas	1923	1927		Quapaw Area 18
449	Put-Han-Sen Area Council	Findlay	Ohio	1930	1992	Merged with Shawnee 452	Black Swamp Area 449
559	Quanah Parker Council	Quanah	Texas	1928	1931		Wichita Area 587
240	Quannapowitt Council	Malden	Massachusetts	1933	1959	Merged with Fellsland 242 and Sachem 223	Minuteman 240
371	Queens Borough Council	New York	New York	1915	1967	Name changed	Greater New York, Queens 644
141	Quincy Area Council	Quincy	Illinois	1927	1935		Saukee Area 141
141	Quincy Council (Illinois)	Quincy	Illinois	1919	1926		Adams County 141
248	Quincy Council (Massachusetts)	Quincy	Massachusetts	1918	1966		Boston 227
74	Quinnipiac Council	Hamden	Connecticut	1935	1998	Merged with Fairfield County 68	Connecticut Yankee 72
631	Racine Council	Racine	Wisconsin	1917	1927		Racine County 631
631	Racine County Council	Racine	Wisconsin	1927	1972	Merged with Kenosha County	Southeast Wisconsin 634
599	Radford Council	Radford	Virginia	1923	1924		
421	Raleigh Council	Raleigh	North Carolina	1919	1921		
421	Raleigh Council	Raleigh	North Carolina	1923	1925		Wake County 421
295	Ramsey County Council	Saint Paul	Minnesota	1925	1929		Saint Paul Area 295
208	Rapides Parish Council	Alexandria	Louisiana	1923	1925		Attakapas 208
356	Raritan Council	Perth Amboy	New Jersey	1927	1969	Merged with Middlesex 344	Thomas A. Edison 352
249	Reading Council	Reading	Massachusetts	1917	1924		Bear Hill 249
528	Reading Council	Reading	Pennsylvania	1916	1921		Berks County 528
528	Reading-Berks County Council	Reading	Pennsylvania	1928	1936		Daniel Boone 528
263	Red Buck Council	Escanaba	Michigan	1938	1945	Merged with Chippewa Area 259, Copper Country 260, Hiawatha Area 261 and Iron Range 649	Hiawathaland 261
	Red Cloud Council	Red Cloud	Nebraska	1922	1923		
363	Red Jacket Council	Brockport	New York	1934	1943	Merged with Rochester Area 397	Otetiana 397
	Red Oak Council	Red Oak	Iowa	1918	1920	ended/dissolved/disbanded^{[b]}	
468	Red River Area Council	Ardmore	Oklahoma	1925	1930	Name changed	Chickasaw 468
429	Red River Valley Council	Fargo	North Dakota	1925	1974	Merged with Great Plains Area 431, Lake Agassiz 430 and Missouri Valley 432	Northern Lights 429
563	Red River Valley Council	Denison	Texas	1940	1947		Circle Ten 571
24	Redlands Area Council	Redlands	California	1945	1952		Grayback 24
	Redlands Council	Redlands	California	1919	1921		
44	Redwood Area Council	Eureka	California	1923	1992	Merged with Sonoma-Mendocino 41	Redwood Empire 41
329	Reno-Western Nevada Area Council	Reno	Nevada	1924	1929		Nevada Area 329
	Revere Council	Revere	Massachusetts	1918	1919		
400	Revolutionary Trails Council	Utica	New York	2002	2016	Merged with Otschodela 393	Leatherstocking Council 400
	Rhinelander Council	Rhinelander	Wisconsin	1922	1924		
288	Rice-Scott-Lesueur Area Council	Faribault	Minnesota	1926	1929		South Central Minnesota 288
553	Richland County Council	Columbia	South Carolina	1923	1929		Central South Carolina 553
602	Richmond Area Council	Richmond	Virginia	1927	1942		Robert E Lee 602
602	Richmond Council	Richmond	Virginia	1915	1924		3rd Congressional District 602
93	Richmond County Council	Augusta	Georgia	1925	1929		Augusta Area 93
759	Ridge Area Council	Lake Wales	Florida	1926	1928		Tampa Bay Area 86
359	Ridgewood Council	Ridgewood	New Jersey	1915	1922		Ridgewood and Glenrock 359
359	Ridgewood-Glen Rock Council	Glen Rock	New Jersey	1922	1997		Bergen 350
412	Rio Grande Area Council	Albuquerque	New Mexico	1927	1934		Northern New Mexico 412
661	Rio Piedras Council	Rio Piedras	Puerto Rico	1924	1925		Puerto Rico 661
	River Edge Council	River Edge	New Jersey	1917	1918		
45	Riverside Council	Riverside	California	1919	1920		Riverside County 43
	Riverside Council	Riverside	Illinois	1918	1918		
	Riverside Council	Riverside	New Jersey	1918	1918		
45	Riverside County & Redlands Council	Riverside	California	1944	1945		Riverside County 45
45	Riverside County Council	Riverside	California	1920	1944		Riverside County and Redlands 45
45	Riverside County Council	Riverside	California	1945	1972	Merged with Arrowhead Area 48	California Inland Empire 45
600	Roanoke Area Council	Roanoke	Virginia	1941	1953		Blue Ridge 600
600	Roanoke Council	Roanoke	Virginia	1916	1941		Roanoke Area 600
602	Robert E. Lee Council	Richmond	Virginia	1953	2003	Name changed	Heart of Virginia 602
728	Robert E. Lee Council	Richmond	Virginia	1926	1932		Richmond Area 602
602	Robert E. Lee-Virginia Council	Richmond	Virginia	1942	1953		Robert E Lee 602
349	Robert Treat Council	Newark	New Jersey	1933	1976	Merged with Orange Mountain and Eagle Rock	Essex 336
	Robinson Council	Robinson	Illinois	1917	1918		
397	Rochester Area Council	Rochester	New York	1926	1943	Merged with Red Jacket 363	Otetiana 397
293	Rochester Council	Rochester	Minnesota	1921	1929		Gamehaven 299
397	Rochester Council	Rochester	New York	1916	1926		Rochester Area 397
142	Rock Island Area Council	Rock Island	Illinois	1916	1946		Fort Armstrong Area 142
660	Rockford Council	Rockford	Illinois	1924	1927		Blackhawk Area 660
	Rockford Council	Rockford	Illinois	1921	1923		
683	Rockland County Council	Stony Point	New York	1924	1996	Merged with Dutchess County 374 and Hudson-Delaware 392	Hudson Valley 374
422	Rocky Mount Council	Rocky Mount	North Carolina	1919	1923		Tar Heel Area 422
63	Rocky Mountain Council	Pueblo	Colorado	1920	2021	Merged with Pikes Peak 60	Pathway to the Rockies 60
398	Rome Council	Rome	New York	1916	1929		Fort Stanwix 398
10	Roosevelt Council	Phoenix	Arizona	1924	1961		Theodore Roosevelt 10
	Rosenberg Council	Rosenberg	Texas	1913	1913		
413	Roswell Council	Roswell	New Mexico	1920	1924	Merged with Carlsbad	Pecos Valley 413
723	Royal Palm Council	Fort Myers	Florida	1925	1937		Sunnyland 724
	Rupert Council	Rupert	Idaho	1922	1924		
	Ruston Council	Ruston	Louisiana	1917	1918		
	Rutland Council	Rutland	Vermont	1920	1921		
593	Rutland County Council	Rutland	Vermont	1923	1929	Merged with Owl 762	Green Mountain 593
578	Sabine Area Council	Port Arthur	Texas	1929	1970	Merged with Trinity-Neches 565	Three Rivers Council 578
134	Sac-Fox (Sac-N-Fox) Council	Moline	Illinois	1959	1967	Merged with Buffalo Bill Area	Illowa 133
223	Sachem Council	Lexington	Massachusetts	1926	1959	Merged with Fellsland 242 and Quannopowitt 240	Minuteman 240
	Saco Council	Saco	Maine	1917	1919		
47	Sacramento Area Council	Sacramento	California	1933	1937		Golden Empire 47
47	Sacramento Council	Sacramento	California	1920	1933		Sacramento Area 47
278	Saginaw Area Council	Saginaw	Michigan	1932	1933		Saginaw Valley 278
265	Saginaw Bay Area Council	Saginaw	Michigan	1961	1971	Merged with Paul Bunyan and 1/2 Scenic Trails	Lake Huron Area 265
278	Saginaw Council	Saginaw	Michigan	1918	1932		Saginaw Area 278
278	Saginaw Valley Council	Saginaw	Michigan	1933	1936		Valley Trails 278
277	Saint Clair Area Council	Port Huron	Michigan	1929	1939		Blue Water 277
	Saint Clair Council	Saint Clair	Michigan	1917	1918		
296	Saint Cloud Council	Saint Cloud	Minnesota	1921	1926		Central Minnesota 296
297	Saint Croix Council	Stillwater	Minnesota	1925	1925	ended/dissolved/disbanded^{[b]}	
19	Saint Francis Valley Council	Jonesboro	Arkansas	1923	1930	ended/dissolved/disbanded^{[b]}	
311	Saint Joseph Area Council	Saint Joseph	Missouri	1927	1932		Pony Express 311
311	Saint Joseph Council	Saint Joseph	Missouri	1917	1926	Merged with North Missouri 667	Saint Joseph Area 311
165	Saint Joseph County Council	South Bend	Indiana	1923	1930		Saint Joseph Valley 165
165	Saint Joseph Valley Council	South Bend	Indiana	1930	1952	Merged with Mishawaka Area 164	Tri Valley 165
403	Saint Lawrence Council	Canton	New York	1938	1982	Merged with Jefferson Lewis 408	Seaway Valley 403
403	Saint Lawrence County Council	Ogdensburg	New York	1921	1938		Saint Lawrence 403
312	Saint Louis Council	St Louis	Missouri	1911	1995	Name changed	Greater St Louis Area 312
295	Saint Paul Area Council	St Paul	Minnesota	1929	1955		Indianhead 295
295	Saint Paul Council	St Paul	Minnesota	1915	1924		Ramsey County 295
	Salamanca Council	Salamanca	New York	1917	1919		
455	Salem Council	Salem	Ohio	1922	1923		North Columbia County 455
493	Salem Council	Salem	Oregon	1918	1923		Willamette District 493
	Salem Council	Salem	Massachusetts	1919	1921		
192	Salina Area Council	Salina	Kansas	1938	1939		Coronado Area 192
196	Salina Council	Salina	Kansas	1917	1926	ended/dissolved/disbanded^{[b]}	
	Salisbury Council	Salisbury	Maryland	1917	1921		
590	Salt Lake and South Davis Counties Council	Salt Lake City	Utah	1924	1926		Salt Lake City Area 590
590	Salt Lake City Area Council	Salt Lake City	Utah	1926	1951		Great Salt Lake 590
590	Salt Lake City Council	Salt Lake City	Utah	1916	1924		Salt Lake and South Davis Counties 590
583	San Antonio Council	San Antonio	Texas	1918	1925		Alamo Area 583
46	San Antonio District Council	Huntington Park	California	1922	1934	Merged with South Pasadena 767 and Los Angeles 33	Los Angeles Metro Area 33
48	San Bernardino District Council	San Bernardino	California	1923	1933		Arrowhead Area 48
48	San Bernardino Valley Council	San Bernardino	California	1922	1923		San Bernardino District 48
55	San Clarsan Beni and Monterey Bay Council	San Jose	California	1928	1929		Santa Clara County 55
49	San Diego Council	San Diego	California	1916	1921		San Diego County 49
49	San Diego County Council	San Diego	California	1921	1993	Merged with Desert Trails 49	Desert Pacific 49
50	San Fernando Valley Council	Van Nuys	California	1923	1972	Merged with Crescent Bay 26	Great Western 51
51	San Francisco Area Council	San Francisco	California	1924	1964	Merged with Oakland Area 21	San Francisco Bay Area Council 28
51	San Francisco Council	San Francisco	California	1916	1924		San Francisco Area 51
28	San Francisco Bay Area Council	Walnut Creek	California	1964	2020	Merged with Alameda and Mount Diablo Silverado Councils	Golden Gate Area Council 028
40	San Gabriel Valley Council	Pasadena	California	1919	2015	Merged with Los Angeles Area Council 33	Greater Los Angeles Area Council 33
52	San Joaquin and Calaveras Counties Council	Stockton	California	1925	1929		San Joaquin-Calaveras 52
52	San Joaquin-Calaveras Council	Stockton	California	1929	1957		Forty-Niner 52
55	San Jose Council	San Jose	California	1920	1922		Santa Clara County 55
661	San Juan Council	San Juan	Puerto Rico	1926	1929		Puerto Rico 661
56	San Luis Obispo County Council	San Luis Obispo	California	1933	1939		Santa Lucia Area 56
20	San Mateo County Council	San Mateo	California	1932	1994	Merged with Stanford Area 31	Pacific Skyline 31
458	Sandusky City Council	Sandusky	Ohio	1921	1925		Firelands Area 458
447	Sandusky County Council	Fremont	Ohio	1919	1925		Hayes Area 447
53	Santa Barbara Council	Santa Barbara	California	1919	1929		Mission 53
	Santa Barbara Council	Santa Barbara	California	1917	1918		
55	Santa Clara & San Benito County Council	San Jose	California	1924	1928		
55	Santa Clara County Council	San Jose	California	1922	1924		Santa Clara and San Benito County 55
55	Santa Clara County Council	San Jose	California	1929	2012	Merged with Monterey Bay	Silicon Valley Monterey Bay Council
31	Santa Cruz County Council	Santa Cruz	California	1922	1922		Loma Prieta District 31
194	Santa Fe Trail Council	Garden City	Kansas	1946	2023		Quivira 198
56	Santa Lucia Area Council	San Luis Obispo	California	1939	1994	Merged with Mission 53	Los Padres 53
486	Sapulpa Council	Sapulpa	Oklahoma	1920	1925		Creek County 486
101	Sarasota Council	Sarasota	Florida	1928	1932		Sunnyland 724
684	Saratoga County Council	Ballston Spa	New York	1924	1990	Merged with Sir William Johnson 377 and Governor Clinton 364	Twin Rivers 364
773	Satsumaland Council	Pensacola	Florida	1927	1935		Gulf Coast 773
	Saugus Council	Saugus	Massachusetts	1919	1921		Lynn 239
158	Sauk Trails Council	Gary	Indiana	1940	1965	Merged with Pokagon Trails 159	Calumet 152
141	Saukee Area Council	Quincy	Illinois	1935	1993	Merged with Southeast Iowa 171	Mississippi Valley 141
	Sault Ste Marie Council	Sault Ste Marie	Michigan	1917	1920		Chippewa County 259
	Sausalito Council	Sausalito	California	1917	1918	Merged with Mill Valley	Marin County 35
143	Savanna Council	Savanna	Illinois	1922	1925	ended/dissolved/disbanded^{[b]}	
99	Savannah Council	Savannah	Georgia	1920	1923		Chatham County 99
274	Scenic Trails Council	Traverse City	Michigan	1939	2012	Merged with Gerald R Ford 266	President Gerald R Ford Field Service Council 781
399	Schenectady Council	Schenectady	New York	1915	1926		Schenectady County 399
399	Schenectady County Council	Schenectady	New York	1926	1991		Twin Rivers 364
526	Schuylkill County Council	Pottsville	Pennsylvania	1930	1941		Appalachian Trail 526
457	Scioto Area Council	Portsmouth	Ohio	1931	1994	Merged with Chief Logan 464 and Central Ohio 441	Central Ohio 441
457	Scioto County Council	Portsmouth	Ohio	1923	1931		Scioto Area 457
325	Scottsbluff Area Council	Scottsbluff	Nebraska	1935	1936		Wyo-Braska 325
328	Scottsbluff Council	Scottsbluff	Nebraska	1920	1924		Platte Valley 663
529	Scranton Council	Scranton	Pennsylvania	1916	1947		Dan Beard 529
609	Seattle Area Council	Seattle	Washington	1924	1954		Chief Seattle 609
609	Seattle Council	Seattle	Washington	1915	1924		Seattle Area 609
403	Seaway Valley Council	Watertown	New York	1982	1998	Merged with Hiawatha 373	Hiawatha 373 and Hiawatha Seaway 373
310	Sedalia Area Council	Sedalia	Missouri	1929	1933		Jefferson City Area 314
310	Sedalia Council	Sedalia	Missouri	1917	1922		Pettis County 310
193	Sekan Area Council	Independence	Kansas	1930	1972		Quivira 198
744	Sekan Area Council	Chanute	Kansas	1926	1930	Merged with Independence 193	Sekan Area 193
	Selma Council	Selma	Alabama	1918	1920		
750	Seneca Council	Olean	New York	1929	1975	Merged with Allegheny Highlands 382	Allegheny Highlands 382
185	Sergeant Floyd Area Council	Sioux City	Iowa	1939	1972	Merged with Prairie Gold	Prairie Gold Area 179
530	Shamokin Council	Shamokin	Pennsylvania	1919	1933		Direct Service
452	Shawnee Council	Lima	Ohio	1926	1992	Merged with Put-Han-Sen 449	Black Swamp Area 449
485	Shawnee Council	Shawnee	Oklahoma	1919	1922		Pottawatomie 485
200	Shawnee Trails Council	Owensboro	Kentucky	1994	2012	Merged into Lincoln Heritage 205	Lincoln Heritage 205
632	Sheboygan County Council	Sheboygan	Wisconsin	1919	1935		Kettle Moraine 632
	Shelbyville Council	Shelbyville	Indiana	1915	1922		
	Shenandoah Council	Shenandoah	Iowa	1920	1921	ended/dissolved/disbanded^{[b]}	
531	Shenango Valley Council	Sharon/Farrell	Pennsylvania	1923	1927	Merged with Grove City 513	Mercer County 531
640	Sheridan Area Council	Sheridan	Wyoming	1926	1931		Central Wyoming 638
640	Sheridan Council	Sheridan	Wyoming	1920	1922		Sheridan County 640
640	Sheridan Council	Sheridan	Wyoming	1925	1926		Sheridan Area 640
640	Sheridan County Council	Sheridan	Wyoming	1922	1925		Sheridan 640
566	Sherman Area Council	Sherman	Texas	1941	1966		Texoma Valley 566
566	Sherman Council	Sherman	Texas	1933	1941		Sherman Area 566
400	Sherrill Council	Sherrill	New York	1919	1925		Rome 398
110	Shoshone County Council	Wallace	Idaho	1918	1923		Shoshone-Kootenai 110
110	Shoshone-Kootenai Council	Wallace	Idaho	1923	1928		Idaho Panhandle 110
215	Shreveport Council	Shreveport	Louisiana	1921	1923		Norwela Area 215
313	Silver Bow Council	Butte	Montana	1927	1944		Vigilante 313
38	Silverado Area Council	Vallejo	California	1928	1992	Merged with Mount Diablo 23	Mount Diablo-Silverado 23
626	Sinnissippi Council		Wisconsin	1966	2005	Merged with Four Lakes 628	Glacier's Edge
185	Sioux City Area Council	Sioux City	Iowa	1926	1939		Sergeant Floyd Area 185
185	Sioux City Council	Sioux City	Iowa	1918	1926	Merged with Lemars 182	Sioux City Area 185
377	Sir William Johnson Council	Gloversville	New York	1937	1990	Merged with Governor Clinton 364 and Saratoga County 684	Twin Rivers 364
401	Siwanoy Council	New Rochelle	New York	1922	1958	Merged with Bronx Valley 370	Siwanoy-Bronx Valley 401
401	Siwanoy-Bronx Valley Council	New Rochelle	New York	1958	1962		Hutchinson River 401
610	Skagit County Council	Mount Vernon	Washington	1923	1929	Merged with Whatcom County 603	Mount Baker Area 603
	Smithtown Council	Smithtown	New York	1917	1918		
111	Snake River Area Council	Twin Falls	Idaho	1924	1985	Name changed	Snake River 111
106	Snake River Council	Twin Falls	Idaho	1985	2020	Merged with Ore-Ida 105	Mountain West 106
54	Solano County Council	Vallejo	California	1922	1925	ended/dissolved/disbanded^{[b]}	
532	Somerset County Council	Somerset	Pennsylvania	1928	1935		Greater Johnstown Area 518
770	Somerville Council	Somerville	Massachusetts	1927	1930		Boston 227
	Somerville Council	Somerville	Massachusetts	1919	1921		
41	Sonoma-Mendocino Area Council	Santa Rosa	California	1944	1992	Merged with Redwood Area 44	Redwood Empire 41
165	South Bend Council	South Bend	Indiana	1919	1923		Saint Joseph County 165
360	South Bergen County Council	Rutherford	New Jersey	1919	1932	ended/dissolved/disbanded^{[b]}	Tamarack 333 1935
288	South Central Minnesota Area Council	Faribault	Minnesota	1929	1946	Divided to Gamehaven 299 and Indianhead 295	Gamehaven 299 and Indianhead 295
470	South Creek County Council	Bristow	Oklahoma	1922	1923		Bristow 470
90	South Florida Area Council	Lakeland	Florida	1923	1925		Polk County 90
	South Haven Council	South Haven	Michigan	1917	1918		
532	South Hills Council	Pittsburgh	Pennsylvania	1921	1928	Merged with Pittsburgh 527	Allegheny County, West 527
681	South Jefferson County Council	Bessemer	Alabama	1924	1927	Merged into Birmingham Area 2	Birmingham Area 2
336	South Jersey Council	Bridgeton	New Jersey	1944	1967	Merged with Gloucester-Salem 678	Southern New Jersey 334
705	South Mississippi Area Council	Mccomb	Mississippi	1925	1928	ended/dissolved/disbanded^{[b]}	
77	South New London County Council	New London	Connecticut	1923	1929		New London 77
345	South Orange Council	South Orange	New Jersey	1917	1919		Orange Mountain 345
767	South Pasadena Council	South Pasadena	California	1927	1934	Merged with Los Angeles 33 and San Antonio District 46	Los Angeles Metro Area 33
	South Portland Council	South Portland	Maine	1918	1921		
3	Southeast Alabama Council	Dothan	Alabama	1935	1963		Alabama-Florida 3
608	Southeast Alaska Council	Juneau	Alaska	1945	2005	Merged with Western Alaska 610	Great Alaska
171	Southeast Iowa Council	Burlington	Iowa	1929	1993	Merged with Saukee Area 141	Mississippi Valley 141
193	Southeast Kansas Council	Independence	Kansas	1930	1935		
305	Southeast Missouri Council	Cape Girardeau	Missouri	1930	1993		Saint Louis 312
563	Southeast Panhandle Council	Memphis	Texas	1928	1931	Merged with Tex-Okla 489	Adobe Walls 569
634	Southeast Wisconsin Council	Racine	Wisconsin	1972	2011	Merged with Milwaukee County 629	Three Harbors 636
464	Southeastern Ohio Council	Marietta	Ohio	1923	1942		Kootaga Area 618
639	Southeastern Wyoming Council	Cheyenne	Wyoming	1925	1928	Merged with Longs Peak 689 and Weld and Morgan Counties 62	Longs Peak 62
226	Southern Berkshire County Council	Pittsfield	Massachusetts	1922	1923		Berkshire County 226
156	Southern Indiana Area Council	Evansville	Indiana	1931	1955	Merged with Buffalo Trace 116	Buffalo Trace 156
184	Southern Iowa Area Council	Ottumwa	Iowa	1929	1970	Merged with Tall Corn 177	Mid-Iowa 177
282	Southern Minnesota Area Council	Albert Lea	Minnesota	1926	1937	Merged with Cedar Valley Area 283	Cedar Valley Area 282
74	Southern New Haven County Council	New Haven	Connecticut	1929	1935		Quinnipiac 74
334	Southern New Jersey Council	Millville	New Jersey	1967	2013	Merged with Burlington County Council	Garden State
423	Southern Pines Council	Southern Pines	North Carolina	1919	1924	ended/dissolved/disbanded^{[b]}	
716	Southern South Dakota Council	Yanktown	South Dakota	1925	1927	Merged with Hiawatha 733	Sioux 733
707	Southern West Virginia Council	Bluefield	West Virginia	1928	1956		Appalachian 673
97	Southwest Georgia Council	Albany	Georgia	1984	2005	Name changed	Chehaw 97
175	Southwest Iowa Council	Council Bluffs	Iowa	1935	1965	Merged with Covered Wagon	Mid-America 326
190	Southwest Kansas Council	Hutchinson	Kansas	1929	1946		Kanza 190
270	Southwest Michigan Council	Kalamazoo	Michigan	1973	2012	Merged with Great Sauk Trail 255	Southern Shores Field Service Council 783
303	Southwest Mississippi Council	Natchez	Mississippi	1923	1928	ended/dissolved/disbanded^{[b]}	
745	Southwest Texas Council	Uvalde	Texas	1926	1936		Concho Valley 741
258	Southwestern Michigan Council	Saint Joseph	Michigan	1941	1973	Merged with Fruit Belt Area 270 and Nottawa Trails 256	Southwest Michigan 270
64	Spanish Peaks Council	Trinidad	Colorado	1927	1932		Rocky Mountain 63
554	Spartanburg Area Council	Spartanburg	South Carolina	1928	1932		Direct Service
554	Spartanburg County Council	Spartanburg	South Carolina	1923	1928	Merged with Pinckney 675	Spartanburg Area 554
611	Spokane Area Council	Spokane	Washington	1925	1931		Inland Empire 611
611	Spokane Council	Spokane	Washington	1915	1925		Spokane Area 611
144	Springfield Council	Springfield	Illinois	1919	1925		Abraham Lincoln 144
234	Springfield Council	Springfield	Massachusetts	1915	1923		Hampden County 234
308	Springfield Council	Springfield	Missouri	1919	1922		Greater Springfield Area 308
308	Springfield Council	Springfield	Missouri	1930	1940		Greater Springfield Area 308
228	Squanto Council	Brockton	Massachusetts	1936	1969	Merged with Old Colony 247	Old Colony 249
78	Stamford Council	Stamford	Connecticut	1916	1939		Alfred M. Dater 78
31	Stanford Area Council	Palo Alto	California	1940	1994	Merged with San Mateo County 20	Pacific Skyline 31
59	Stanislaus County Council	Modesto	California	1921	1922		Yosemite Area 59
132	Starved Rock Area Council	La Salle	Illinois	1926	1973	Merged with Corn Belt 115 and Creve Coeur 138	W.D. Boyce 138
534	State College Council	State College	Pennsylvania	1917	1929	Number changed to 831	
831	State College Council	State College	Pennsylvania	1929	1930		Juniata Valley 497
620	State Line Council	Beloit	Wisconsin	1936	1966	Merged with Indian Trails 633	Sinnissippi 626
396	Staten Island Council	Richmond	New York	1928	1968	Name changed	Greater New York, Staten Island 645
601	Staunton Council	Staunton	Virginia	1921	1924		Stonewall Jackson 763
463	Steel Valley Council	Painesville	Ohio	1993	1993	Name changed	Greater Western Reserve 463
487	Stephens County Council	Duncan	Oklahoma	1921	1924		Jefferson-Stephens Area 487
402	Steuben Area Council	Bath	New York	1931	1991	Merged with Sullivan Trail 375	Five Rivers 375
402	Steuben County Council	Bath	New York	1922	1931		Steuben Area 402
458	Steubenville Council	Steubenville	Ohio	1922	1926		
633	Stevens Point Council	Stevens Point	Wisconsin	1921	1927		
297	Stillwater & Baytown Tnshp Council	Stillwater	Minnesota	1922	1925		Saint Croix 297
297	Stillwater Council	Stillwater	Minnesota	1921	1922		Stillwater and Baytown Townships 297
	Stillwater Council	Stillwater	Oklahoma	1920	1922	Merged with Creek County	Cimarron Valley 473
52	Stockton Council	Stockton	California	1918	1922		San Joaquin 52
	Stoneham Council	Stoneham	Massachusetts	1920	1923		
763	Stonewall Jackson Area Council	Waynesboro	Virginia	1927	2020		Renamed to Virginia Headwaters Council
169	Story County Council	Ames	Iowa	1923	1930		Tall Corn Area 169
	Stoughton Council	Stoughton	Massachusetts	1917	1919		
	Stroudsburg Council	Stroudsburg	Pennsylvania	1917	1918		
	Sturgeon Bay Council	Sturgeon Bay	Wisconsin	1918	1919		
279	Sturgis Council	Sturgis	Michigan	1923	1929		Fort Hill 279
761	Sullivan County Council	Liberty	New York	1926	1930		Orange-Sullivan 392
375	Sullivan Trail Council	Elmira	New York	1947	1991	Merged with Steuben Area 402	Five Rivers 375
257	Summer Trails Council	Bay City	Michigan	1927	1961	Merged with Valley Trails	Saginaw Bay 265
	Summit Council	Summit	New Jersey	1918	1922		
199	Sumner-Crowley Council	Winfield	Kansas	1925	1928	ended/dissolved/disbanded^{[b]}	
533	Sunbury Council	Sunbury	Pennsylvania	1917	1918		Sunbury-Northumberland 533
533	Sunbury Council	Sunbury	Pennsylvania	1920	1927		Susquehanna Valley Area 533
533	Sunbury-Northumberland Council	Sunbury	Pennsylvania	1918	1920		Sunbury 533
692	Sunflower River Council	Indianola	Mississippi	1925	1929		Delta Area 300
724	Sunnyland Council	Sarasota	Florida	1926	1995		Southwest Florida 88
634	Superior Council	Superior	Wisconsin	1922	1936		Gitche Gumee 634
533	Susquehanna Valley Area Council	Sunbury	Pennsylvania	1927	1975	Merged with West Branch 543	Susquehanna 533
368	Susquenango Council	Binghamton	New York	1920	1922		Binghamton 368
368	Susquenango Council	Binghamton	New York	1925	1998	Merged into Baden-Powell 368	Baden-Powell 368
	Sycamore Council	Sycamore	Illinois	1917	1920		
390	Syracuse Council	Syracuse	New York	1915	1923		Onondaga County 390
568	T-O Council	Denison	Texas	1930	1936	ended/dissolved/disbanded^{[b]}	
612	Tacoma Area Council	Tacoma	Washington	1927	1948		Mount Rainier 612
612	Tacoma Council	Tacoma	Washington	1918	1924		Pierce County 612
648	Tahoe Area Council	Auburn	California	1924	1971		Golden Empire 47
169	Tall Corn Area Council	Ames	Iowa	1930	1932	Merged with Tri-Valley 778, Des Moines Area 177 and Central Iowa 658	Tall Corn Area 177
177	Tall Corn Area Council	Des Moines	Iowa	1932	1970	Merged with Southern Iowa Area 184	Mid-Iowa 177
264	Tall Pine Council	Flint	Michigan	1937	2012	Merged with Lake Huron Area 265, Chief Okemos 271 and Blue Water 277	Water and Woods Field Service Council 782
91	Tallahassee Council	Tallahassee	Florida	1922	1924		Suwannee River Area 664
333	Tamarack Council	Lyndhurst	New Jersey	1935	1986	Dissolved	Essex 336 and Bergen 350
86	Tampa Bay Area Council	Tampa	Florida	1925	1939	Merged with Flaming Arrow 90	Gulf Ridge 86
86	Tampa Council	Tampa	Florida	1919	1922		Hillsborough County 86
422	Tar Heel Area Council	Rocky Mount	North Carolina	1923	1934		East Carolina 426
582	Tarrant County Council	Fort Worth	Texas	1922	1927	Merged with Cooke and Denton Area 572	Fort Worth Area 582
	Tarrytown Council	Tarrytown	New York	1917	1918		
734	Tazewell County Council	Pekin	Illinois	1926	1929	Merged with Peoria 138	Creve Coeur 138
472	Tejas Council	Nacogdoches	Texas	1928	1931	Merged with Davey Crockett 586 and Pine Tree Area 585	East Texas Area 585
109	Tendoy Area Council	Pocatello	Idaho	1934	1993	Merged with Teton Peaks 107	Grand Teton 107
659	Tennessee Valley Council	Huntsville	Alabama	1924	1931	ended/dissolved/disbanded^{[b]}	
659	Tennessee Valley Council	Huntsville	Alabama	1934	1998	Merged with Choccolocco 1 and Central Alabama 2	Greater Alabama 1
361	Tenafly Council	Tenafly	New Jersey	1920	1924	ended/dissolved/disbanded^{[b]}	North Bergen 350
166	Terre Haute Council	Terre Haute	Indiana	1912	1924		Vigo County 166
166	Terre Haute Council	Terre Haute	Indiana	1929	1931		Wabash Valley 166
	Terrell Council	Terrell	Texas	1921	1921		
107	Teton Peaks Council	Idaho Falls	Idaho	1925	1993	Merged with Tendoy Area 109	Grand Teton 107
489	Tex-Okla Council	Guymon	Oklahoma	1928	1931	Merged with Southeast Panhandle 563	Adobe Walls 569
594	Texarkana Council	Texarkana	Texas	1919	1928		Texas-Arkansas 584
584	Texas-Arkansas Council	Texarkana	Texas	1928	1936		Caddo Area 584
566	Texoma Valley Council	Sherman	Texas	1966	1993		Circle Ten 571
136	Thatcher Woods Area Council	Oak Park	Illinois	1941	1993	Merged with West Suburban 147	Des Plaines Valley 147
494	The Dalles Council	The Dalles	Oregon	1924	1925		Mid-Columbia 494
10	Theodore Roosevelt Council (Arizona)	Phoenix	Arizona	1962	1993	Merged with Grand Canyon 12	Grand Canyon 10
352	Thomas A. Edison Council	Edison	New Jersey	1969	1999	Merged with George Washington 362	Central New Jersey
381	Thompkins County Council	Ithaca	New York	1926	1929		Louis Agassiz Fuertes 381
9	Three G Council	Safford	Arizona	1943	1962		Copper 9
162	Three Rivers Council	Logansport	Indiana	1936	1973	Merged with Harrison Trails 161 and Meshingomesia 163	Sagamore 162
	Tiffin Council	Tiffin	Ohio	1915	1932		Put-Han-Sen Area 449
275	Timber Trails Council	Muskegon	Michigan	1944	1975	Merged with Grand Valley 266	West Michigan Shores 266
591	Timpanagos Area Council	Provo	Utah	1922	1936	Merged with Bryce Canyon 671	Utah National Parks 591
383	Tioughnioga Council	Cortland	New York	1940	1975	Merged with Louis Agassiz Fuertes	Baden-Powell 381
161	Tippecanoe Area Council	Lafayette	Indiana	1932	1940		Harrison Trails 161
161	Tippecanoe County Council	La Fayette	Indiana	1926	1932		Tippecanoe Area 161
130	To-Perr-Ne-Bee Council	Kankakee	Illinois	1929	1930	ended/dissolved/disbanded^{[b]}	
776	Tok-Hok-Nok Council	Newton	New Jersey	1927	1931		Direct Service, Morris Area 343
642	Tokyo Japan Council	Tokyo	Japan	1923	1926	ended/dissolved/disbanded^{[b]}	
460	Toledo Area Council	Toledo	Ohio	1929	1999	Name changed	Erie Shores 460
460	Toledo Council	Toledo	Ohio	1915	1925		Maumee Valley 460
307	Tom Sawyer Area Council	Hannibal	Missouri	1928	1937		Central Missouri 653
442	Tomahawk Area Council	Coshocton	Ohio	1947	1956	Merged with Zane Trace Area 467	Muskingum Valley 467
547	Tonqua Area Council	Yoakum	Texas	1928	1932	ended/dissolved/disbanded^{[b]}	
197	Topeka Council	Topeka	Kansas	1919	1929		Jayhawk Area 197
	Topeka Council	Topeka	Kansas	1917	1918		
79	Torrington Council	Torrington	Connecticut	1918	1929		Northern Litchfield County 79
586	Tr-An-Le-Ho Council	Palestine	Texas	1928	1930	Merged with Limestone and Freestone Area 698	Davey Crockett 586
112	Trails West Council	Wood River	Illinois	1991	2009	Merged with Okaw Valley 116	Lewis and Clark 112
589	Trapper Trails Council	Ogden	Utah	1993	2020	Consolidated with Great Salt Lake 590 and Utah National Parks 591	Crossroads of the West 590
362	Trenton Area Council	Trenton	New Jersey	1925	1926		Trenton-Mercer Area 362
362	Trenton Council	Trenton	New Jersey	1915	1925	Merged with Princeton 357	Trenton Area 362
362	Trenton-Mercer Area Council	Trenton	New Jersey	1926	1937		George Washington 362
128	Tri-City Council	Granite City	Illinois	1922	1925		Cahokia Mound 128
663	Tri-City Council	Scottsbluff	Nebraska	1926	1927	ended/dissolved/disbanded^{[b]}	
672	Tri-State Area Council	Huntington	West Virginia	1935	2014	Merged with Buckskin 617	Buckskin Council
323	Tri-Trails Council	North Platte	Nebraska	1954	1993		Overland Trails 322
165	Tri-Valley Council	South Bend	Indiana	1952	1972	Merged with Pioneer Trails 155 and Pottawattomie 731	Northern Indiana 165
778	Tri-Valley Council	Newton	Iowa	1929	1931	Merged with Des Moines Area 177, Tall Corn Area 169 and Central Iowa 658	Tall Corn Area 177
	Trinidad-Las Animas County Council	Trinidad	Colorado	1917	????		
565	Trinity-Neches Council	Beaumont	Texas	1942	1970	Merged with Sabine Area 578	Three Rivers 578
409	Troy Area Council	Troy	New York	1924	1947		Uncle Sam 409
409	Troy Council	Troy	New York	1919	1924		Troy Area 409
	Troy Council	Troy	Ohio	1921	1921	ended/dissolved/disbanded^{[b]}	
461	Trumball County Council	Warren	Ohio	1922	1948		Western Reserve 464
665	Tuckabackee Council	Paris	Illinois	1927	1929		Kickapoo 665
11	Tucson Council	Tucson	Arizona	1920	1922		Catalina 11
56	Tulare County Council	Visalia	California	1922	1925	ended/dissolved/disbanded^{[b]}	
488	Tulsa Council	Tulsa	Oklahoma	1917	1921		Tulsa County Area 488
488	Tulsa County Area Council	Tulsa	Oklahoma	1921	1957	Merged with Creek Nation	Indian Nations 488
737	Tumwater Area Council	Olympia	Washington	1926	1933	ended/dissolved/disbanded^{[b]}	
737	Tumwater Area Council	Olympia	Washington	1934	1993	Merged with Pacific Harbors 612	Pacific Harbors 612
79	Tunxis Council	Torrington	Connecticut	1947	1972	Merged with Middlesex County, Mattatuck, Nathan Hale and Charter Oak	Long Rivers 66
	Tuscarawas Council	New Philadelphia	Ohio	1920	1922		Massillon 463
462	Tuscarawas & W. Stark Area Council	Massillon	Ohio	1923	1925		West Stark County and North Tuscarawas County 462
462	Tuscarawas & W.Stark Area Council	Massillon	Ohio	1926	1929		Fort Laurens Area 462
154	Twin City Council	East Chicago	Indiana	1925	1970		Calumet 152
111	Twin Falls Council	Twin Falls	Idaho	1922	1924		Snake River Area 111
607	Twin Harbors Area Council	Hoquiam	Washington	1930	1993	Merged with Mount Rainier 612	Pacific Harbors 612
630	Twin Lakes Council	Oshkosh	Wisconsin	1935	1973	Merged with Badger 622, Waumegesako 625, Nicolet Area 621, Valley 635 and Kettle Moraine 632	Bay Lakes 635
127	Two Rivers Council	St Charles	Illinois	1968	1992	Merged with Du Page Area 148	Three Fires 127
585	Tyler Council	Tyler	Texas	1922	1924		Kickapoo 585
535	Tyrone Council	Tyrone	Pennsylvania	1917	1929	Merged with Altoona 496	Blair-Bedford 496
772	U. S. Grant Area Council	Freeport	Illinois	1927	1971		Blackhawk Area 660
405	Ulster County Council	Kingston	New York	1919	1930		Ulster-Greene 405
405	Ulster-Greene Council	Kingston	New York	1930	1950		Rip Van Winkle 405
738	Umatilla Council	Pendleton	Oregon	1926	1927		Blue Mountain 604
409	Uncle Sam Council	Troy	New York	1947	1963	Merged with Fort Orange 364	Fort Orange-Uncle Sam 364
338	Union Council	Elizabeth	New Jersey	1914	1980		Watchung Area 358
	Union Council	Union	New Jersey	1917	1918		
537	Uniontown Council	Uniontown	Pennsylvania	1919	1924	Merged with Connelsville	Fayette County 536
329	University Place Council	University Place	Nebraska	1919	1924		Lincoln 324
202	Upper Cumberland Council	Middlesboro	Kentucky	1929	1949		Cumberland 202
406	Upper Mohawk Council	Utica	New York	1937	1981	Merged with Iroquois 395	Land of The Oneidas 395
591	Utah County Council	Provo	Utah	1921	1922		Timpanagos Area 591
591	Utah National Parks Council	Orem	Utah	1936	2020	Consolidated with Great Salt Lake 590 and Trapper Trails 589	Crossroads of the West 590
406	Utica Council	Utica	New York	1915	1937		Upper Mohawk 406
419	Uwharrie Council	High Point	North Carolina	1923	1992	Merged with General Green 418	Old North State 70
	Vacaville Council	Vacaville	California	1917	1918		Solano County 54
635	Valley Council	Menasha	Wisconsin	1922	1924		Fox River Valley 635
635	Valley Council	Menasha	Wisconsin	1925	1973	Merged with Badger 622, Waumegesako 625, Nicolet Area 621, Twin Lakes 630 and Kettle Moraine 632	Bay Lakes 635
507	Valley Forge Council	Valley Forge	Pennsylvania	1936	1996	Merged with Philadelphia 525	Cradle of Liberty 525
278	Valley Trails Council	Saginaw	Michigan	1936	1961		Saginaw Bay Area 265
463	Van Wert Council	Van Wert	Ohio	1922	1926		Shawnee Area 452
156	Vanderburg County Council	Evansville	Indiana	1914	1917		Evansville-Vandenburg County 156
537	Venango County Council	Oil City	Pennsylvania	1922	1925		Clarion and Venango 537
715	Verde Council	Clarksdale	Arizona	1925	1927		Yavapai-Mohave 12
304	Vicksburg Council	Vicksburg	Mississippi	1919	1927	Merged with Hinds and Rankin Counties 301	Kickapoo Area 301
313	Vigilante Council	Butte	Montana	1944	1973	Merged with Western Montana 320	Montana 315
166	Vigo County Council	Terre Haute	Indiana	1925	1929		Terre Haute 166
289	Viking Council	Minneapolis	Minnesota	1951	2005	Merged with Indianhead 295	Northern Star 250
	Vineland Council	Vineland	New Jersey	1917	1918		
410	Virgin Islands Council	Christiansted	Virgin Islands	1960	2013	acquired by the National Capital Area Council 82	
298	Virginia Council	Virginia	Minnesota	1919	1925		Arrowhead 298
462	W. Stark & N. Tuscarawas Co Council	Massillon	Ohio	1925	1926		Tuscarawas and West Stark Area 462
167	Wabash Council	Wabash	Indiana	1919	1928	ended/dissolved/disbanded^{[b]}	
145	Wabash Valley Council	Princeton	Indiana	1923	1924		George Rogers Clark 145
166	Wabash Valley Council	Terre Haute	Indiana	1931	2002	Merged with Crossroads of America Council (2 districts), Lincoln Trails Council (most of 1 district), and Prairieland Council (part of 1 district)	Crossroads of America, Lincoln Trails Council, and Prairieland Council
237	Wachusett Council	Leominister	Massachusetts	1921	1965	Merged with Fitchburg Area 231	Nashua Valley 230
	Waco Council	Waco	Texas	1915	1919		
421	Wake County Council	Raleigh	North Carolina	1925	1929	Merged with Durham County 696	Occoneechee 421
709	Walker-Lamar Council	Jasper	Alabama	1925	1932	ended/dissolved/disbanded^{[b]}	
709	Walker-Lamar Council	Jasper	Alabama	1936	1938		Black Warrior 6
697	Wallamet Council	Eugene	Oregon	1933	1944		Oregon Trail 697
423	Walter Hines Page Council	Sanford	North Carolina	1924	1930		Occoneechee 421
250	Waltham & Watertown Council	Waltham	Massachusetts	1926	1926	Merged with Concord 230	Waltham-Watertown-Concord 250
250	Waltham Council	Waltham	Massachusetts	1922	1926		Waltham and Watertown 250
250	Waltham-Watertown-Concord Council	Waltham	Massachusetts	1926	1927		Waltham-Watertown-Concord-Wellesley 250
250	Waltham-Watertown-Concord-Wellesley .. Council	Waltham	Massachusetts	1927	1928		Minuteman 250
186	Wapsipinicon Area Council	Waterloo	Iowa	1929	1971		Winnebago 173
461	Warren Council	Warren	Ohio	1919	1922		Trumbull County 461
378	Warren County Council	Glens Falls	New York	1920	1922		Glens Falls 378
538	Warren County Council	Warren	Pennsylvania	1913	1952		Chief Cornplanter 538
221	Washington Area Council	Hagerstown	Maryland	1939	1956		Mason-Dixon 221
541	Washington Council	Washington	Pennsylvania	1920	1925		Washington County 720
	Washington Council	Washington	Pennsylvania	1917	1918		
221	Washington County Council	Hagerstown	Maryland	1927	1939		Washington Area 221
388	Washington County Council	Hudson Falls	New York	1927	1930		Mohican 378
464	Washington County Council	Marietta	Ohio	1922	1923		Southeastern Ohio 464
559	Washington County Council	Johnson City	Tennessee	1923	1925		Appalachian 559
720	Washington County Council	Washington	Pennsylvania	1925	1930		Washington-Greene Counties 720
82	Washington DC Council	Washington	D.C.	1913	1937		National Capital Area 82
388	Washington Irving Council	White Plains	New York	1951	1974	Merged with Hutchinson River 401	Westchester-Putnam 388
511	Washington Trail Council	Erie	Pennsylvania	1944	1972	Merged with Custaloga 531 and Colonel Drake 537	French Creek 532
720	Washington-Greene Counties Council	Washington	Pennsylvania	1930	1964		Nemacolin Trails 720
470	Washita Valley Council	Clinton	Oklahoma	1927	1933		Central Oklahoma 480
255	Washtenaw County Council	Ann Arbor	Michigan	1925	1935		Washtenaw-Livingston 255
255	Washtenaw-Livingston Council	Ann Arbor	Michigan	1935	1951		Portage Trails 255
358	Watchung Area Council	Mountainside	New Jersey	1926	1999	Merged with Morris-Sussex 343	Patriots Path
80	Waterbury Council	Waterbury	Connecticut	1915	1935	Merged with Naugatuck 72	Mattatuck 80
186	Waterloo Council	Waterloo	Iowa	1920	1929		Wapsipinicon Area 186
251	Watertown Council	Watertown	Massachusetts	1923	1926		Waltham 250
408	Watertown Council	Watertown	New York	1921	1925		Jefferson and Lewis Area 408
637	Watertown Council	Watertown	Wisconsin	1922	1925		
	Waterville Council	Waterville	Maine	1918	1918		
172	Waubeek Area Council	Cedar Rapids	Iowa	1942	1952	Merged with Iowa River Valley 181	Hawkeye Area 172
175	Waubonsie Boyer Council	Council Bluffs	Iowa	1936	1935		Southwest Iowa 175
146	Waukegan & North Chicago Council	Waukegan	Illinois	1924	1928		Lake County 146
146	Waukegan Council	Waukegan	Illinois	1918	1924		Waukegan and North Chicago 146
625	Waumegesako Council	Manitowoc	Wisconsin	1940	1973	Merged with Badger 622, Nicolet Area 621, Valley 635, Twin Lakes 630 and Kettle Moraine 632	Bay Lakes 635
644	Wausau Council	Wausau	Wisconsin	1920	1926	Merged with Merrill 627	Marathon and Lincoln Counties 627
586	Waxahachie Council	Waxahachie	Texas	1920	1927	ended/dissolved/disbanded^{[b]}	
151	Wayne Area Council	Hagerstown	Indiana	1931	1935		Whitewater Valley 151
151	Wayne County Council	Hagerstown	Indiana	1927	1931		Wayne Area 151
465	Wayne County Council	Wooster	Ohio	1919	1925		
	Webb City Council	Webb City	Missouri	1918	1918		
700	Webb County Council	Laredo	Texas	1925	1927		Aztec 700
	Webb County Council	Laredo	Texas	1922	1923		
	Webster City Council	Webster City	Iowa	1918	1919		
	Webster Groves Council	Webster Groves	Missouri	1917	1923		Saint Louis 312
	Weehawken Council	Weehawken	New Jersey	1917	1918		
62	Weld & Morgan Counties Council	Greeley	Colorado	1924	1928	Merged with Longs Peak 689 and Southeastern Wyoming 639	Longs Peak 62
579	Wellington Council (Texas)	Wellington	Texas	1922	1924	ended/dissolved/disbanded^{[b]}	
613	Wenatchee Council	Wenatchee	Washington	1922	1924		North Central Washington 613
543	West Branch Council	Williamsport	Pennsylvania	1935	1975	Merged with Susquehanna Valley	Susquehanna 533
474	West Central Florida Council	Clearwater	Florida	1978	2016	Merged with Gulf Ridge 86	Greater Tampa Bay Area 86
90	West Georgia Council	La Grange	Georgia	1946	1964	Merged with Georgia-Alabama 90	Chattahoochee 91
	West Hoboken Council	West Hoboken	New Jersey	1917	1918		
266	West Michigan Shores Council	Grand Rapids	Michigan	1975	1995	Name changed	Gerald R. Ford 266
	West New York Council	West New York	New Jersey	1917	1918		
363	West Orange Council	West Orange	New Jersey	1917	1933	Merged with East Orange 337, Orange 353 and Orange Mountain 345	Oranges and Maplewood Area 337
	West Palm Beach Council	West Palm Beach	Florida	1917	1919		
147	West Suburban Council	La Grange	Illinois	1918	1993	Merged with Thatcher Woods 136	Des Plaines Valley 147
687	West Tennessee Council	Jackson	Tennessee	1924	1930		Direct Service
	Westchester County Council	White Plains	New York	1919	1922	Divided to (379) and (401)	379 and 401
610	Western Alaska Council	Anchorage	Alaska	1954	2005	Merged with Southeast Alaska 608	Great Alaska
64	Western Colorado Council	Grand Junction	Colorado	1942	2019		Merged with Denver Area Council 61
106	Western Idaho Council	Nampa	Idaho	1927	1929		Oregon-Idaho Area 106
200	Western Kentucky Area Council	Owensboro	Kentucky	1928	1952	Merged with Mammoth Cave 206	Audubon 200
320	Western Montana Council	Missoula	Montana	1924	1973	Merged with Vigilante 313	Montana 315
461	Western Reserve Council	Warren	Ohio	1948	1993	Merged with Mahoning Valley 466 and Northeast Ohio 463	Greater Western Reserve 463
	Westminster Council	Westminster	Maryland	1917	1919		
512	Westmoreland County Council	Greensburg	Pennsylvania	1924	1937		Westmoreland-Fayette 512
	Westmoreland County Council	Greensburg	Pennsylvania	1916	1919		
	Weston Council	Weston	Massachusetts	1919	1919		
603	Whatcom Council	Bellingham	Washington	1926	1929	Merged with Skagit County 610	Mount Baker Area 603
148	Wheaton Council	Wheaton	Illinois	1922	1928	Merged with Glen Ellyn 127	Du Page Area 148
	Wheaton Council	Wheaton	Illinois	1918	1919		
619	Wheeling and Moundsville Council	Wheeling	West Virginia	1923	1925		Wheeling Area 619
619	Wheeling Area Council	Wheeling	West Virginia	1925	1926		Huroquois 619
619	Wheeling Council	Wheeling	West Virginia	1916	1923		Wheeling and Moundsville 619
410	White Plains Council	White Plains	New York	1917	1922		Fenimore Cooper 410
145	White River Area Council	Bloomington	Indiana	1927	1973	Merged with Hoosier Hills Area 150	Hoosier Trails 145
151	Whitewater Valley Council	Hagerstown	Indiana	1935	1972	Merged with Central Indiana 160, Kikthawenund Area 149 and Delaware County 679	Crossroads of America 160
168	Whiting Council	Whiting	Indiana	1920	1935		Direct Service
587	Wichita Area Council	Wichita Falls	Texas	1927	1937		Northwest Texas Area 587
198	Wichita Council	Wichita	Kansas	1918	1940		Quivira 198
587	Wichita Falls Council	Wichita Falls	Texas	1920	1927		Wichita Area 587
125	Wigwam Council	Galesburg	Illinois	1934	1940		Prairie Area 125
542	Wilkes-Barre Council	Wilkes-Barre	Pennsylvania	1915	1925		Wyoming Valley 542
473	Will Rogers Council	Ponca City	Oklahoma	1948	2000	Merged with Great Salt Plains 474	Cimarron
493	Willamette District Council	Salem	Oregon	1923	1926		Cascade Area 493
517	William Penn Council	Indiana	Pennsylvania	1933	1970	Merged with Blair Bedford Area 496 and Admiral Peary 518	Penn's Woods 508
543	Williamsport Council	Williamsport	Pennsylvania	1919	1929		Lycoming County 543
	Williamstown Council	Williamstown	Massachusetts	1917	1919		
432	Williston Council	Williston	North Dakota	1924	1925	ended/dissolved/disbanded^{[b]}	
81	Wilmington Area Council	Wilmington	Delaware	1931	1936		Del-Mar-Va 81
81	Wilmington Council	Wilmington	Delaware	1914	1931		Wilmington Area 81
425	Wilmington Council	Wilmington	North Carolina	1916	1926		New Hanover County 425
426	Wilson Council	Wilmington	North Carolina	1924	1932		East Carolina 426
252	Winchester Council	Winchester	Massachusetts	1922	1929	changed to 811	
811	Winchester Council	Winchester	Massachusetts	1929	1930		Medford 242
	Winchester Council	Winchester	Virginia	1916	1922		Winchester and Frederick County
	Winchester and Frederick County Council	Winchester	Virginia	1922	1923		
747	Windham-Windsor Council	Springfield	Vermont	1926	1936		Calvin Coolidge 747
199	Winfield Council	Winfield	Kansas	1922	1925	Merged with Arkansas City 187	Sumner-Crowley 199
299	Winona Council	Winona	Minnesota	1921	1925		Gamehaven 299
427	Winston-Salem Area Council	Winston-Salem	North Carolina	1917	1942		Old Hickory 427
253	Winthrop Council	Winthrop	Massachusetts	1918	1930		Lynn 239
636	Wisconsin Rapids Council	Wisconsin Rapids	Wisconsin	1917	1925		Wood County 636
755	Withlacoochee Council	Valdosta	Georgia	1926	1930		Okefenokee Area 758
255	Wolverine Council	Ann Arbor	Michigan	1973	1993	Merged with Land O' Lakes 269	Great Sauk Trail 255
711	Wolverine Council	Dundee	Michigan	1925	1973	Merged with Portage Trails 255	Wolverine 255
636	Wood County Council	Wisconsin Rapids	Wisconsin	1925	1929		Central Wisconsin 636
	Woodbury Council	Woodbury	New Jersey	1917	1918		
549	Woonsocket Council	Woonsocket	Rhode Island	1924	1930	Merged with Greater Providence Area 546, Pawtucket and Central Falls 548	Narragansett 546
254	Worcester Area Council	Worcester	Massachusetts	1915	1955		Mohegan 254
280	Wyandotte Council	Wyandotte	Michigan	1920	1924		Detroit 262
191	Wyandotte County Council	Kansas City	Kansas	1923	1929		Kaw 191
325	Wyo-Braska Council	Scottsbluff	Nebraska	1936	1975	Merged into Longs Peak 62	Longs Peak 62
542	Wyoming Valley Council	Kingston	Pennsylvania	1925	1969	Merged with Anthracite 514	Penn Mountains 522
614	Yakima Council	Yakima	Washington	1919	1924		Yakima County 614
614	Yakima County Council	Yakima	Washington	1924	1925		Yakima Valley Area 614
614	Yakima Valley Area Council	Yakima	Washington	1925	1942		Central Washington 614
236	Yankee Clipper Council	Haverhill	Massachusetts	1993	2015	Merged with Boston Minuteman 227	Spirit Of Adventure
555	Yankton Council	Yankton	South Dakota	1920	1924	ended/dissolved/disbanded^{[b]}	
12	Yavapai & Mohave Counties Council	Prescott	Arizona	1924	1926		Yavapai-Mohave 12
12	Yavapai District Council	Prescott	Arizona	1922	1924		Yavapai and Mohave Counties 12
12	Yavapai-Mohave Council	Prescott	Arizona	1926	1929		Northern Arizona 12
	Yazoo County Council	Yazoo City	Mississippi	1919	1922		
319	Yellowstone Area Council	Livingston	Montana	1924	1926	ended/dissolved/disbanded^{[b]}	Direct Service
318	Yellowstone Valley Council	Billings	Montana	1928	1973	Merged with North Central Montana 315	Montana 315
521	Yohogania Area Council	Mckeesport	Pennsylvania	1951	1971	Merged with Monongahela 521	Mon-Yough 523
411	Yonkers Council	Yonkers	New York	1915	1954		Washington Irving 388
544	York Council	York	Pennsylvania	1922	1932		York-Adams Area 544
217	York County Council	North Berwick	Maine	1927	1935		Pine Tree 218
544	York County Council	York	Pennsylvania	1918	1922		York 544
544	York-Adams Area Council	York	Pennsylvania	1932	2010	Merged with Keystone Area 515	Keystone York Adams 544
59	Yosemite Area Council	Modesto	California	1922	1998	Name changed	Greater Yosemite 59
466	Youngstown Council	Youngstown	Ohio	1915	1927		Mahoning Valley 466
281	Ypsilanti Council	Ypsilanti	Michigan	1922	1925	Merged with Ann Arbor 255	Washtenaw County 255
467	Zane Trace Area Council	Zanesville	Ohio	1929	1956	Merged with Tomahawk Area 442	Muskingum Valley 467
467	Zanesville Council	Zanesville	Ohio	1919	1923		Muskingum County 467
670	Zion National Park Council	Cedar City	Utah	1924	1930		Timpanagos Area 591

== See also ==
- Council shoulder patch
- History of the Boy Scouts of America
- Local council camps of the Boy Scouts of America
