= List of councils (Scouting America) =

Local councils of Scouting America
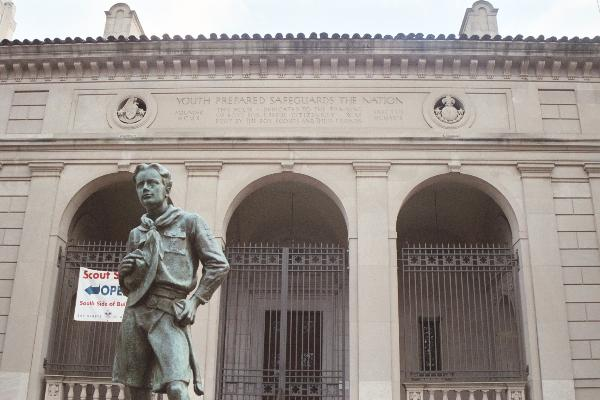
- The Ideal Scout, a statue by R. Tait McKenzie in front of the Bruce S. Marks Scout Resource Center, the former headquarters of the Cradle of Liberty Council in Philadelphia

The program of Scouting America is administered through 242 local councils, with each council covering a geographic area that may vary from a single city to an entire state. Each council receives an annual charter from the National Council and is usually incorporated as a charitable organization. Most councils are administratively divided into districts that directly serve Scout units.

Councils previously fell into one of four regions: Western, Central, Southern, and Northeast. Each region was then subdivided into areas. The total number of councils depends on how they are counted:

- There are 242 individual local councils.
- Direct Service covers units outside of local councils. Although technically not a council, it is assigned a council number.
- Greater New York Councils has five boroughs, each with an assigned council number.
- Each of the four regions has an assigned council number.

== Current councils of the Boy Scouts of America ==
Current councils of the Boy Scouts of America
Council number	Council name	Headquarters city	Headquarters state	Lodges	Camps
1	Greater Alabama Council	Birmingham	Alabama	Coosa Lodge	Comer Scout Reservation; Camp Jack Wright; Camp Jackson; Camp Sequoyah; Camp Westmoreland
3	Alabama-Florida Council	Dothan	Alabama	Cowikee Lodge	Camp Alaflo
4	Mobile Area Council	Mobile	Alabama	Woa Cholena Lodge	Maubila Scout Reservation; Boy Scout Camp Pinetreat
5	Tukabatchee Area Council	Montgomery	Alabama	Alibamu Lodge	Camp Dexter C. Hobbs; Camp Tukabatchee
6	Black Warrior Council	Tuscaloosa	Alabama	Aracoma Lodge	Camp Horne; Camp O'Rear; White Bluff Scout Reservation
10	Grand Canyon Council	Phoenix	Arizona	Wipala Wiki Lodge	Camp Geronimo; Camp Raymond; Camp Theodore Roosevelt / R-C Scout Ranch; Heard Scout Pueblo; Lake Pleasant Camp; Little Grand Canyon Ranch
11	Catalina Council	Tucson	Arizona	Papago Lodge	Double V Scout Ranch; Camp Lawton
18	Natural State Council	Little Rock	Arkansas		
23	Golden Gate Area Council	Pleasant Hill	California	Yerba Buena Lodge	Camp Wolfeboro; Camp Herms; Rancho Los Mochos; Camp Royaneh; Wente Scout Reservation
27	Sequoia Council	Fresno	California	Tah-Heetch Lodge	Camp Chawanakee; Camp Wortman
30	Southern Sierra Council	Bakersfield	California	Yowlumne Lodge	Camp Kern
31	Pacific Skyline Council	Foster City	California	Ohlone Lodge	Camp Oljato; Cutter Scout Reservation; Boulder Creek Scout Reservation
32	Long Beach Area Council	Long Beach	California	Puvunga Lodge	Camp Tahquitz; Aquatics Sea Base
33	Greater Los Angeles Area Council	Los Angeles	California	Tuku'ut Lodge	Camp Cherry Valley; Camp Trask; Camp Holcomb Valley; Firestone Scout Reservation; Cabrillo Beach Youth Waterfront Sports Center; Forest Lawn Scout Reservation; Log Cabin Wilderness Camp
35	Marin Council	San Rafael	California	Talako Lodge	Camp Tamarancho; Marin-Sierra; Slane's Flat
39	Orange County Council	Santa Ana	California	Wiatava Lodge	Irvine Ranch Outdoor Education Center; Newport Sea Base; Oso Lake Boy Scout Camp; Schoepe Scout Reservation
41	Redwood Empire Council	Santa Rosa	California	Orca Lodge	Camp Masonite-Navarro; Camp Noyo
42	Piedmont Council	Piedmont	California	Hungteetsepoppi Lodge	Camp Wallace Alexander (closed)
45	California Inland Empire Council	Redlands	California	Cahuilla Lodge	Boseker Scout Reservation
47	Golden Empire Council	Sacramento	California	Amangi Nacha Lodge	Camp Robert Cole; NorCal Adventure Area; Camp Winton
49	San Diego-Imperial Council	San Diego	California	Tiwahe Lodge	Mataguay Scout Ranch; Youth Aquatic Center
51	Western Los Angeles County Council	Van Nuys	California	Malibu Lodge	Camp Emerald Bay; Camp Whitsett; Camp Josepho
53	Los Padres Council	Santa Barbara	California	Chumash Lodge	Rancho Alegre
55	Silicon Valley Monterey Bay Council	San Jose	California	Saklan Lodge	Camp Chesebrough; Camp Hi-Sierra; Camp Pico Blanco
57	Ventura County Council	Camarillo	California	Topa Topa Lodge	Camp Three Falls; Camp Willett
58	Verdugo Hills Council	Glendale	California	Spe-Le-Yai Lodge	Camp Verdugo Oaks; Camp Silver Fir
59	Greater Yosemite Council	Modesto	California	Toloma Lodge	Camp John Mensinger; Pendola Sierra Adventure Base; Camp McConnell; Camp Isom
60	Pathway to the Rockies Council	Colorado Springs	Colorado	Buffalo Mountain Lodge	Camp Alexander; Glen Aspen Ranch; Rocky Mountain High Adventure Base; San Isabel Scout Ranch
61	Greater Colorado Council	Denver	Colorado	Tahosa Lodge	Peaceful Valley Scout Ranch; Tahosa High Adventure Base; Steve Fossett Spirit of Adventure Ranch
62	Adventure West Council	Greeley	Colorado	Kola Lodge	Ben Delatour Scout Ranch; Camp Laramie Peak; Camp Patiya; Jack Nicol Cub Scout Camp; Chimney Park Scout Ranch; Camp Buffalo Bill
66	Connecticut Rivers Council	Hartford	Connecticut	Tschitani Lodge	Camp Barbour; Camp Mattatuck; Camp Workcoeman; June Norcross Webster Scout Reservation; Edmund D. Strang Scout Reservation
67	Greenwich Council	Greenwich	Connecticut	Achewon Netopalis Lodge	Ernest Thompson Seton Scout Reservation
70	Old North State Council	Greensboro	North Carolina	Tsoiotsi Tsogalii Lodge	Cherokee Scout Reservation; Woodfield Scout Preservation; Hemrick Scout Reservation; Hagan Sea Base
72	Connecticut Yankee Council	Milford	Connecticut	Owaneco Lodge	Camp Sequassen; Deer Lake Scout Reservation; Hoyt Scout Reservation; Wah Wah Tay See; Camp Pomperaug
81	Del-Mar-Va Council	Dover	Delaware	Nentego Lodge	Henson Scout Reservation; Rodney Scout Reservation; Akridge Scout Reservation
82	National Capital Area Council	Bethesda	Maryland	Amangamek Wipit Lodge	Camp William B. Snyder; Goshen Scout Reservation
83	Central Florida Council	Apopka	Florida	Tipisa Lodge	Leonard and Marjorie Williams Family Scout Reservation
84	South Florida Council	Miami Lakes	Florida	O-Shot-Caw Lodge	Camp Elmore; Camp Everglades; Camp Sawyer
85	Gulf Stream Council	Palm Beach Gardens	Florida	Aal-Pa-Tah Lodge	Tanah Keeta Scout Reservation; Oklawaha Scout Reservation; Camp Dark Hammock
87	North Florida Council	Jacksonville	Florida	Echockotee Lodge	Camp Shands; St Johns River Base
88	Southwest Florida Council	Fort Myers	Florida	Osceola Lodge	Dr. Franklin Miles Camp; Camp Flying Eagle
89	Greater Tampa Bay Area Council	Tampa	Florida	Uh-To-Yeh-hut-Tee Lodge	Camp Soule; Sand Hill Scout Reservation; Camp Owen J. Brorein; Flaming Arrow Scout Reservation; Bigfoot Wilderness Camp; Camp Alafia
91	Chattahoochee Council	Columbus	Georgia	Chattahoochee Lodge	Camp Frank G Lumpkin; Camp Pine Mountain
92	Atlanta Area Council	Atlanta	Georgia	Egwa Tawa Dee Lodge	Woodruff Scout Reservation; Bert Adams Scout Reservation; Allatoona Scout Reservation
93	Georgia-Carolina Council	Augusta	Georgia	Bob White Lodge	Robert E. Knox Scout Reservation; Camp Daniel Marshall
95	Flint River Council	Griffin	Georgia	Ini-To Lodge	Camp Thunder
96	Central Georgia Council	Macon	Georgia	Echeconnee Lodge	
98	South Georgia Council	Valdosta	Georgia	Withlacoochee Lodge	Camp Osborn; Camp Patten
99	Coastal Georgia Council	Savannah	Georgia	I-Tsu-La Lodge	Black Creek Scout Reservation; Camp Tolochee
100	Northwest Georgia Council	Rome	Georgia	Waguli Lodge	Camp Sidney Dew; Camp Westin
101	Northeast Georgia Council	Jefferson	Georgia	Mowogo Lodge	Camp Rainey Mountain; Scoutland; Camp Rotary
104	Aloha Council	Honolulu	Hawaii	Na Mokupuni O Lawelawe Lodge	Camp Pupukea (Oahu); Camp Maluhia (Big Island)
106	Mountain West Council	Boise	Idaho	Tukarica Lodge	Camp Morrison; Salmon River High Adventure Base (SRHAB); Camp Bradley; Camp Murtaugh
107	Grand Teton Council	Idaho Falls	Idaho	Shunkah Mahneetu Lodge	
117	Prairielands Council	Champaign	Illinois	Illini Lodge	
127	Three Fires Council	St Charles	Illinois	Lowaneu Allanque Lodge	Camp Freeland Leslie; Camp Big Timber
129	Northeast Illinois Council	Highland Park	Illinois	Ma-Ka-Ja-Wan Lodge	Camp Makajawan
133	Illowa Council	Davenport	Iowa	Konepaka Ketiwa Lodge	Loud Thunder Scout Reservation
138	W. D. Boyce Council	Peoria	Illinois	Wenasa Quenhotan Lodge	
141	Mississippi Valley Council	Quincy	Illinois	Black Hawk Lodge	
144	Abraham Lincoln Council	Springfield	Illinois	Illinek Lodge	Camp Bunn; Camp Illinek
145	Hoosier Trails Council	Bloomington	Indiana	Nischa Chuppecat Lodge	Maumee Scout Reservation
156	Buffalo Trace Council	Evansville	Indiana	Kiondaga Lodge	Old Ben Scout Reservation
157	Anthony Wayne Area Council	Fort Wayne	Indiana	Kiskakon Lodge	Anthony Wayne Scout Reservation
160	Crossroads of America Council	Indianapolis	Indiana	Jaccos Towne Lodge	Ransburg Scout Reservation; Camp Krietenstein; Camp Kikthawenund; Camp Belzer
162	Sagamore Council	Kokomo	Indiana	Takachsin Lodge	
165	La Salle Council	South Bend	Indiana	Sakima Lodge	Wood Lake Scout Reservation/Camp Tamarack; Camp ToPeNeBee; Rice Woods Camp
172	Hawkeye Area Council	Cedar Rapids	Iowa	Cho-Gun-Mun-A-Nock Lodge	Howard H. Cherry Scout Reservation
173	Winnebago Council	Waterloo	Iowa	Sac-N-Fox Lodge	Camp Ingawanis
177	Mid-Iowa Council	Des Moines	Iowa	Mitigwa Lodge	
178	Northeast Iowa Council	Dubuque	Iowa	Timmeu Lodge	
192	Coronado Area Council	Salina	Kansas	Kidi-Kidish Lodge	
197	Jayhawk Area Council	Topeka	Kansas	Dzie-Hauk Tonga Lodge	
198	Quivira Council	Wichita	Kansas	Kansa Lodge	Camp Kanza; Quivira Scout Ranch; Spanish Peaks Scout Ranch
204	Blue Grass Council	Lexington	Kentucky	Kawida Lodge	
205	Lincoln Heritage Council	Louisville	Kentucky	Nguttitehen Lodge	Harry S. Frazier Jr. Scout Reservation; Tunnel Mill Scout Reservation; Pfeffer Scout Reservation
209	Calcasieu Area Council	Lake Charles	Louisiana	Quelqueshoe Lodge	Camp Edgewood
211	Istrouma Area Council	Baton Rouge	Louisiana	Quinipissa Lodge	Avondale Scout Reservation; Camp Carruth
212	Evangeline Area Council	Lafayette	Louisiana	Atchafalaya Lodge	
213	Louisiana Purchase Council	Monroe	Louisiana	Comanche Lodge	Camp Attakapas; Camp T. L. James
214	Southeast Louisiana Council	Metairie	Louisiana	Chilantakoba Lodge	
215	Norwela Council	Shreveport	Louisiana	Caddo Lodge	Kinsey Scout Reservation
216	Katahdin Area Council	Orono	Maine	Pamola Lodge	Katahdin Scout Reservation - Camp Roosevelt, Eddington, Maine, Maine High Adventure
218	Pine Tree Council	Portland	Maine	Madockawanda Lodge	Camp William Hinds, Raymond, Maine; Camp Bomazeen, Belgrade, Maine; Camp Gustin, Sabattus, Maine; Camp Nutter, Acton, Maine
220	Baltimore Area Council	Baltimore	Maryland	Nentico Lodge	Broad Creek Memorial Scout Reservation
224	Cape Cod and the Islands Council	Yarmouth Port	Massachusetts	Abake Mi-Sa-Na-Ki Lodge	
227	Spirit of Adventure Council	Woburn	Massachusetts	Pennacook Lodge	T.L. Storer Scout Reservation, Barnstead, New Hampshire; New England Base Camp, Milton, Massachusetts; Parker Mountain Scout Camp, Barnstead, New Hampshire; Wah-Tut-Ca Scout Reservation, Northwood, New Hampshire; Lone Tree Scout Reservation, Kingston, New Hampshire
230	Heart of New England Council	Rutland	Massachusetts	Catamount Lodge	Camp Wanocksett, Dublin, New Hampshire; Camp Split Rock, Ashburnham, Massachusetts; Treasure Valley Scout Reservation Rutland, Massachusetts
234	Western Massachusetts Council	Westfield	Massachusetts	Pocumtuc Lodge	Horace Moses Scout Reservation
250	Northern Star Council	Saint Paul	Minnesota	Totanhan Nakaha Lodge	Base Camp; Fred C. Anderson Scout Camp; Kiwanis Scout Camp; Many Point Scout Camp; Phillippo Scout Reservation; Rum River Scout Camp; Stearns Scout Camp; Tomahawk Scout Camp
251	Mayflower Council	Milford	Massachusetts	Tantamous Lodge	Camp Squanto, Plymouth, Massachusetts; Camp Resolute, Bolton, Massachusetts; Nobscot Scout Reservation, Framingham, Massachusetts
283	Twin Valley Council	Mankato	Minnesota	Wahpekute Lodge	Cuyuna Scout Camp; Cedar Point Scout Camp; Norseland Scout Camp
296	Central Minnesota Council	Sartell	Minnesota	Naguonabe Lodge	
299	Gamehaven Council	Rochester	Minnesota	Blue Ox Lodge	
302	Choctaw Area Council	Meridian	Mississippi	Ashwanchi Kinta Lodge	Camp Binachi
303	Andrew Jackson Council	Jackson	Mississippi	Sebooney Okasucca Lodge	Warren Hood Scout Reservation
304	Pine Burr Area Council	Hattiesburg	Mississippi	Ti'ak Lodge	
306	Ozark Trails Council	Springfield	Missouri	Wah-Sha-She Lodge	Camp Arrowhead; Frank Childress Scout Reservation; Cow Creek Scout Reservation
307	Heart of America Council	Kansas City	Missouri	Tamegonit Lodge	Theodore Naish Scout Reservation (Kansas); H. Roe Bartle Scout Reservation (Missouri)
311	Pony Express Council	Saint Joseph	Missouri	O Ni Flo	Camp Geiger Scout Reservation
312	Greater Saint Louis Area Council	Saint Louis	Missouri	Shawnee Lodge; Anpetu-we Lodge; Nisha Kittan Lodge; Woapink Lodge	Beaumont Scout Reservation; S-F Scout Ranch; Camp Lewallen; Pine Ridge Scout Camp; Camp Joy; Camp Warren Levis; Camp Vandeventer; Rhodes France Scout Reservation; Swift High Adventure Base
315	Montana Council	Great Falls	Montana	Apoxky Aio Lodge	Camp Melita Island on Melita Island; K-M Scout Ranch; Camp Arcola; Grizzly Base Camp
324	Cornhusker Council	Walton	Nebraska	Golden Sun Lodge	
326	Mid-America Council	Omaha	Nebraska	Kit-Ke-Hak-O-Kut Lodge	
328	Las Vegas Area Council	Las Vegas	Nevada	Nebagamon Lodge	
329	Nevada Area Council	Reno	Nevada	Tannu Lodge	
330	Daniel Webster Council	Manchester	New Hampshire	Passaconaway Lodge	Hidden Valley Scout Camp; Camp Bell
333	Northern New Jersey Council	Oakland	New Jersey	Lenapehoking Lodge	Camp No-Be-Bo-Sco; Floodwood Mountain Reservation; Alpine Scout Camp; Dow Druckker Scout Reservation; Camp Lewis; Camp Yaw-Paw
341	Jersey Shore Council	Toms River	New Jersey	Japeechen Lodge	
347	Monmouth Council	Morganville	New Jersey	Na Tsi Hi Lodge	Forestburg Scout Reservation; Quail Hill Scout Reservation
358	Patriots' Path Council	Cedar Knolls	New Jersey	Woapalanne Lodge	Winnebago Scout Reservation; Mt. Allamuchy Scout Reservation; Sabattis Adventure Camp
364	Twin Rivers Council	Albany	New York	Kittan Lodge	Camp Wakpominee; Rotary Scout Reservation
368	Baden-Powell Council	Binghamton	New York	Otahnagon Lodge	Camp Barton Tuscarora Scout Reservation
373	Longhouse Council	Syracuse	New York	Lowanne Nimat Lodge	Sabattis Scout Reservation
380	Great Falls Council	Buffalo	New York	TKäen DoD Lodge	Camp Brule; Camp Gorton
382	Allegheny Highlands Council	Falconer	New York	Ho-Nan-Ne-Ho-Ont Lodge	Camp Merz Elk Lick Scout Reservation
386	Theodore Roosevelt Council	Massapequa	New York	Buckskin Lodge	Onteora Scout Reservation Schiff Scout Reservation
388	Greater Hudson Valley Council	Fishkill	New York		
397	Seneca Waterways Council	Rochester	New York	Tschipey Achtu Lodge	Camp Babcock-Hovey; J. Warren Cutler Scout Reservation; Massawepie Scout Camps
400	Leatherstocking Council	Utica	New York	Ohkwaliha·Ká Lodge; Onteroraus Lodge	
404	Suffolk County Council	Medford	New York	Shinnecock Lodge	Baiting Hollow Scout Camp
405	Rip Van Winkle Council	Kingston	New York	Half Moon Lodge	
412	High Desert Council	Albuquerque	New Mexico	Yah-Tah-Hey-Si-Kess Lodge; Gila Lodge	
413	Conquistador Council	Roswell	New Mexico	Kwahadi Lodge	
414	Daniel Boone Council	Asheville	North Carolina	Tsali Lodge	Camp Daniel Boone; Lumpkin High Adventure Base
415	Mecklenburg County Council	Charlotte	North Carolina	Catawba Lodge	Belk Scout Camp; Camp Grimes
416	Central North Carolina Council	Albemarle	North Carolina	Itibapishe Iti Hollo Lodge	Camp John J. Barnhardt
420	Piedmont Council	Gastonia	North Carolina	Eswau Huppeday Lodge	Camp Bud Schiele
421	Occoneechee Council	Raleigh	North Carolina	Occoneechee Lodge	Camp Durant (part of the Occoneechee Scout Reservation (OSR)); Camp Reeves (part of the Occoneechee Scout Reservation (OSR)); Camp Cambell
424	Tuscarora Council	Goldsboro	North Carolina	Nayawin Rar Lodge	Camp Tuscarora
425	Cape Fear Council	Wilmington	North Carolina	Klahican Lodge	Camp Bowers; Camp McNeil (Cub Scout World)
426	East Carolina Council	Kinston	North Carolina	Croatan Lodge	Camp Boddie: Pamlico Sea Base; Camp Sam Hatcher; Camp Bonner
427	Old Hickory Council	Winston-Salem	North Carolina	Wahissa Lodge	Camp Raven Knob
429	Northern Lights Council	Fargo	North Dakota	Pa-Hin Lodge	Camp Wilderness Scout Camp; Heart Butte Scout Reservation; Big 4 Scout Camp; Tom Brantner Memorial Camp; Butler Wilderness Outpost
433	Great Trail Council	Akron	Ohio	Marnoc Lodge	Camp Manatoc; Camp Stambaugh (Ohio)
436	Buckeye Council	Canton	Ohio	Sipp-O Lodge	Camp McKinley; Camp Rodman; Seven Ranges Scout Reservation
438	Dan Beard Council	Cincinnati	Ohio	Ku-Ni-Eh Lodge	Camp Friedlander; Camp Michaels; Camp Craig; Cub World Adventure Camp
439	Tecumseh Council	Springfield	Ohio	Tarhe Lodge	Camp Hugh Taylor Birch
440	Lake Erie Council	Cleveland	Ohio	Erielhonan Lodge	Beaumont Scout Reservation (Ohio); Firelands Scout Reservation
441	Simon Kenton Council	Columbus	Ohio	Tecumseh Lodge	Camp Lazarus; Camp Falling Rock; Chief Logan Reservation; Camp Oyo
444	Miami Valley Council	Dayton	Ohio	Miami Lodge	Woodland Trails Scout Reservation; Cricket Holler Scout Camp
449	Black Swamp Area Council	Findlay	Ohio	Mawat Woakus Lodge	
456	Pathway to Adventure Council	Chicago	Illinois	Takhone Lodge	Owasippe Scout Reservation; Camp Betz
460	Erie Shores Council	Toledo	Ohio	Tindeuchen Lodge	
467	Muskingum Valley Council	Zanesville	Ohio	Netawatwees Lodge	
468	Arbuckle Area Council	Ardmore	Oklahoma	Wisawanik Lodge	Camp Simpson
469	Cherokee Area Council	Bartlesville	Oklahoma	Washita Lodge	Camp McClintock
480	Last Frontier Council	Oklahoma City	Oklahoma	Ma-Nu Lodge; Ema 'O Mahpe Lodge	Kerr Scout Ranch at Slippery Falls; Will Rogers Scout Reservation
488	Indian Nations Council	Tulsa	Oklahoma	Ta Tsu Hwa Lodge	Tom Hale Scout Reservation
492	Cascade Pacific Council	Beaverton	Oregon	Wauna La-Mon'tay Lodge	Aubrey Watzek Lodge; Butte Creek Scout Ranch; Camp Baldwin; Camp Clark; Camp Cooper; Camp Ireland; Camp Lewis; Camp Meriwether; Camp Pioneer; Camp Royce-Finel
497	Juniata Valley Council	Reedsville	Pennsylvania	Monaken Lodge	Seven Mountains Scout Camp
500	Moraine Trails Council	Butler	Pennsylvania	Kuskitannee Lodge	Camp Bucoco; Camp Agawam
501	Northeastern Pennsylvania Council	Moosic	Pennsylvania	Lowwapaneu Lodge	
502	Minsi Trails Council	Lehigh Valley	Pennsylvania	Witauchsoman Lodge	Camp Minsi
504	Columbia-Montour Council	Bloomsburg	Pennsylvania	Wyona Lodge	Camp Lavigne
509	Bucktail Council	Du Bois	Pennsylvania	Ah'Tic Lodge	Camp Mountain Run
512	Westmoreland-Fayette Council	Greensburg	Pennsylvania	Wagion Lodge	Camp Buck Run; Camp Conestoga; Eberly Scout Reservation
524	Pennsylvania Dutch Council	Lancaster	Pennsylvania	Wunita Gokhos Lodge	Bashore Scout Reservation; J Edward Mack Scout Reservation
525	Cradle of Liberty Council	Philadelphia	Pennsylvania	Unami Lodge	Musser Scout Reservation; Resica Falls Scout Reservation
527	Laurel Highlands Council	Pittsburgh	Pennsylvania	Allohak Menewi Lodge	Heritage Scout Reservation
528	Hawk Mountain Council	Reading	Pennsylvania	Kittatinny Lodge	Hawk Mountain Scout Reservation
532	French Creek Council	Erie	Pennsylvania	Langundowi Lodge	Custaloga Town Scout Reservation
533	Susquehanna Council	Williamsport	Pennsylvania	Woapeu Sisilija Lodge	Camp Karoondinha
538	Chief Cornplanter Council	Warren	Pennsylvania	Gyantwachia Lodge	Camp Olmsted
539	Chester County Council	Exton	Pennsylvania	Octoraro Lodge	Horseshoe Scout Reservation; Camp John H. Ware, III
544	New Birth of Freedom Council	Mechanicsburg	Pennsylvania	Sasquesahanough Lodge	Hidden Valley Scout Reservation; Camp Tuckahoe
546	Narragansett Council	East Providence	Rhode Island	Tulpe Lodge	Cachalot Scout Reservation; Camp Norse; Yawgoog Scout Reservation
549	Palmetto Area Council	Spartanburg	South Carolina	Skyuka Lodge	
550	Coastal Carolina Council	Charleston	South Carolina	Unali'Yi Lodge	Camp Ho Nan Wah
551	Blue Ridge Council	Greenville	South Carolina	Atta Kulla Kulla Lodge	Camp Old Indian
553	Indian Waters Council	Columbia	South Carolina	Muscogee Lodge	Camp Barstow
556	Cherokee Area Council	Chattanooga	Tennessee	Talidandaganu' Lodge	Skymont Scout Reservation
557	Great Smoky Mountain Council	Knoxville	Tennessee	Pellissippi Lodge	Camp Buck Toms; Camp Pellissippi
558	Chickasaw Council	Memphis	Tennessee	Ahoalan-Nachpikin Lodge	Kia Kima Scout Reservation; Camp Currier; Camp Sardis
559	West Tennessee Area Council	Jackson	Tennessee	Ittawamba Lodge	Camp Mack Morris
560	Middle Tennessee Council	Nashville	Tennessee	Wa-Hi-Nasa Lodge	Boxwell Scout Reservation; Latimer Reservation; Parrish Reservation; Grimes Canoe Base
561	Texas Trails Council	Abilene	Texas	Penateka Lodge	Camp Tonkawa; Camp Billy Gibbons
562	Golden Spread Council	Amarillo	Texas	Nischa Achowalogen Lodge	Camp MK Brown; Camp Don Harrington
564	Capitol Area Council	Austin	Texas	Tonkawa Lodge	Lost Pines Scout Reservation; Cub World at Camp Tom Wooten; Griffith League Scout Ranch; Camp Alma McHenry; Camp Green Dickson; Roy D. Rivers Wilderness Camp; Smilin V Scout Ranch
567	Buffalo Trail Council	Midland	Texas	Tatanka Lodge	
571	Circle Ten Council	Dallas	Texas	Mikanakawa Lodge	Camp Constantin; Camp Wisdom; Camp Trevor Rees-Jones; Camp James Ray
574	Bay Area Council	Galveston	Texas	Wihinipa Hinsa Lodge	
576	Sam Houston Area Council	Houston	Texas	Colonneh Lodge	Bovay Scout Ranch; McNair Cub Scout Adventure Camp & Tellepsen Scout Camp; Camp Brosig; Camp Strake (under construction)
577	South Texas Council	Corpus Christi	Texas	Karankawa Lodge	
578	Three Rivers Council	Beaumont	Texas	Hasinai Lodge	
583	Alamo Area Council	San Antonio	Texas	Aina Topa Hutsi Lodge	McGimsey Scout Park; Bear Creek Scout Reservation; Mays Family Scout Ranch
584	Caddo Area Council	Texarkana	Texas	Akela Wahinapay Lodge	
585	East Texas Area Council	Tyler	Texas	Tejas Lodge	
587	Northwest Texas Council	Wichita Falls	Texas	Wichita Lodge	Perkins Scout Reservation
590	Crossroads of the West Council	Ogden	Utah	El-Ku-Ta Lodge; Awaxaawe' Awachia Lodge; Tu-Cubin-Noonie Lodge	Camp Kiesel; Camp Maple Dell; Camp Tracy; Camp Hunt; Camp Loll; Camp Maple Dell; Ogden Ropes Course; Teton High Adventure Base
592	Green Mountain Council	Waterbury	Vermont	Ajapeu Lodge	Mount Norris Scout Reservation; Camp Sunrise
595	Colonial Virginia Council	Newport News	Virginia	Wahunsenakah Lodge	Bayport Scout Reservation (closed)
596	Tidewater Council	Virginia Beach	Virginia	Blue Heron Lodge	Pipsico Scout Reservation
598	Shenandoah Area Council	Winchester	Virginia	Onerahtokha Lodge	Camp Rock Enon; Sinoquipe Scout Reservation
599	Blue Ridge Mountains Council	Roanoke	Virginia	Tutelo Lodge	Blue Ridge Scout Reservation
602	Heart of Virginia Council	Richmond	Virginia	Nawakwa Lodge	Heart of Virginia Scout Reservation; Camp T. Brady Saunders; Camp Douglas S. Fleet; Cub and Webelos Adventure Camp; Albright Scout Reservation; Eagle Point
604	Blue Mountain Council	Kennewick	Washington	Wa-La-Moot-Kin Lodge	
606	Mount Baker Council	Everett	Washington	Sikhs Mox Lamonti Lodge	* Fire Mountain
609	Chief Seattle Council	Seattle	Washington	T'Kope Kwiskwis Lodge	Camp Edward; Camp Parsons; Camp Pigott; Camp Sheppard
610	Great Alaska Council	Anchorage	Alaska	Nanuk Lodge	
611	Inland Northwest Council	Spokane	Washington	Es-Kaielgu Lodge	Camp Cowles; Camp Easton; Camp Grizzly
612	Pacific Harbors Council	Tacoma	Washington	Nisqually Lodge	
615	Mountaineer Area Council	Fairmont	West Virginia	Menawngihella Lodge; Onondaga Lodge	
617	Buckskin Council	Charleston	West Virginia	Takhonek Lodge	
620	Glacier's Edge Council	Madison	Wisconsin	Bigfoot Lodge	Ed Bryant Scout Reserve
624	Gateway Area Council	La Crosse	Wisconsin	Ni-Sanak-Tani Lodge	Camp Decorah
627	Samoset Council	Weston	Wisconsin	Tom Kita Chara Lodge	Tesomas Scout Camp
635	Bay-Lakes Council	Appleton	Wisconsin	Kon Wapos Lodge	Bear Paw Scout Camp; Gardner Dam Scout Camp; Camp Rokolio (Cub Scout World); Camp Hiawatha; Jax Camp
636	Three Harbors Council	Milwaukee	Wisconsin	Kanwa tho Lodge	Camp Oh-Da-Ko-Ta
637	Chippewa Valley Council	Eau Claire	Wisconsin	Otyokwa Lodge	L.E. Phillips Scout Reservation
640	Greater New York Councils	New York	New York	Kintecoying Lodge	Ten Mile River Scout Camps; Alpine Scout Camp; Pouch Camp
651	Potawatomi Area Council	Waukesha	Wisconsin	Wag-O-Shag Lodge	Camp Long Lake
653	Great Rivers Council	Columbia	Missouri	Nampa-Tsi Lodge	
660	Blackhawk Area Council	Rockford	Illinois	Wulapeju Lodge	Camp Lowden; Canyon Camp
661	Puerto Rico Council	Guaynabo	Puerto Rico	Yokahu Lodge	Guajataka Scout Reservation
662	Longhorn Council	Hurst	Texas	Netopalis Sipo Schipinachk Lodge	Sid Richardson Scout Ranch; Hills and Hollows; Camp Shuler; Camp Tahuaya; Worth Ranch
664	Suwannee River Area Council	Tallahassee	Florida	Semialachee Lodge	
690	Garden State Council	Westampton	New Jersey	Lenape Lodge	Pine Hill Scout Reservation
694	South Plains Council	Lubbock	Texas	Nakona Lodge	
695	Black Hills Area Council	Rapid City	South Dakota	Crazy Horse Lodge	Medicine Mountain Scout Ranch
696	Midnight Sun Council	Fairbanks	Alaska	Toontuk Lodge	Lost Lake Scout Camp
697	Pacific Crest Council	Eugene	Oregon	Tsisqan Lodge; Lo La 'Qam Geela Lodge	Camp Baker; Camp Melakwa
702	Rainbow Council	Morris	Illinois	Waupecan Lodge	Rainbow Council Scout Reservation
713	Sequoyah Council	Johnson City	Tennessee	Sequoyah Lodge	
733	Sioux Council	Sioux Falls	South Dakota	Tetonwana Lodge	Lewis & Clark Scout Reservation; Camp Iyataka
741	Texas Southwest Council	San Angelo	Texas	Wahinkto Lodge	
748	Natchez Trace Council	Tupelo	Mississippi	Ofi' Tohbi Lodge	
763	Virginia Headwaters Council	Waynesboro	Virginia	Shenandoah Lodge	Camp Shenandoah
773	Gulf Coast Council	Pensacola	Florida	Yustaga Lodge	Spanish Trail Scout Reservation
775	Rio Grande Council	Harlingen	Texas	Wewanoma Lodge	
777	Washington Crossing Council	Doylestown	Pennsylvania	Ajapeu Lodge	Ockanickon Scout Reservation
780	Michigan Crossroads Council	Eagle	Michigan	Mishigami Lodge	Camp Rotary; Camp Teetonkah; Cole Canoe Base; D-Bar-A Scout Ranch; Gerber Scout Reservation; Great Lakes Sailing Adventure
800	Direct Service	Irving	Texas	Gamenowinink Lodge	
802	Transatlantic Council	Brussels	Belgium	Black Eagle Lodge	
803	Far East Council	Camp Zama	Japan	Achpateuny Lodge	
901	Northeast Region	n/a	n/a	n/a	none
902	Southern Region	n/a	n/a	n/a	none
903	Central Region	n/a	n/a	n/a	none
904	Western Region	n/a	n/a	n/a	none
999	National Council	Irving	Texas	n/a	none

== See also ==
- Local councils of the Boy Scouts of America
- Local council camps of the Boy Scouts of America
- Defunct local councils of the Boy Scouts of America
- List of councils (Girl Scouts of the USA)
