= Cherokee Council =

Cherokee Council may be:

- Cherokee Area Council (Tennessee)
- Cherokee Council (Georgia)
- Cherokee Council (North Carolina)
