= Pellissippi =

Pellissippi (Pelisipi, Pelisippi) may refer to:

- Clinch River, formerly known as the Pellissippi River
- Ohio River, formerly known as the Pellissippi River
- Pellissippi Lodge, of the Order of the Arrow boyscouts
- Pellissippi Parkway, a highway in Tennessee
- Pellissippi State Community College, in Knox County, Tennessee
