= Jersey Shore Council =

Boy scout council in New Jersey

Coordinates: 39°46′57″N 74°18′02″W

- Owner: Boy Scouts of America
- Headquarters: Toms River, New Jersey
- Website www.jerseyshorescouts.org

The Jersey Shore Council serves all of Ocean and Atlantic Counties, and parts of Burlington and Cape May Counties. Its camp is the Joseph A. Citta Scout Reservation, located in Brookville, New Jersey.

== History ==
Jersey Shore Council #341 was formed in 1992 when Ocean County Council #341 and Atlantic Area Council #331 merged. Order of the Arrow Lodge Japeechen #341 was formed when Gitche Gumee #423 (from Atlantic Area Council #331) and Schiwa’ Pew Names #535 (from Ocean County Council #341) merged in 1993.

In 2022, the council sold its 4 acres (1.6 ha) property in Toms River as part of the child abuse settlement.

== Districts ==
The council is divided into the following districts:

- Joshua Huddy District (Brick, Jackson, Lakewood, Point Pleasant, and Toms River)
- Jersey Devil District (Barnegat, Bass River, Beachwood, Berkeley, Lacey, Lakehurst, Little Egg Harbor, Manahawkin, Manchester, New Egypt, New Gretna, Ocean Gate, Pine Beach, Seaside Heights, South Toms River, Tuckerton, Waretown, West Creek, and Whiting)
- Southern Shore District (All of Atlantic County and Ocean City)

== Joseph A. Citta Scout Reservation ==
Joseph A. Citta Scout Reservation
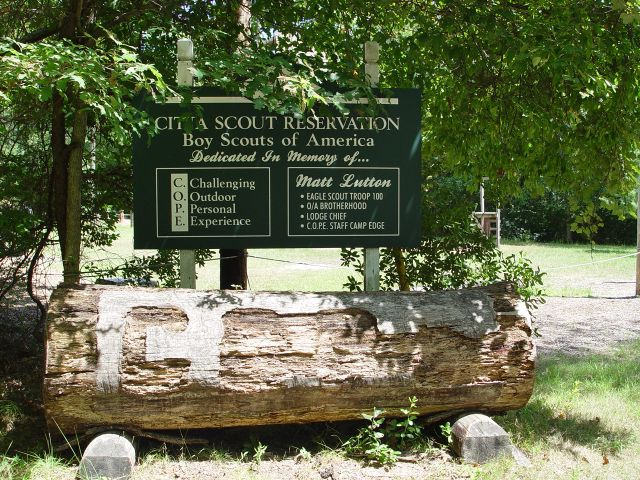
- Owner: Jersey Shore Council
- Location: Brookville, Ocean Township, Ocean County, New Jersey
- Founded: 1957
- Website www.cittascoutreservation.org

The Joseph A. Citta Scout Reservation at Brookville is a Boy Scout Camp located in the Brookville section of Ocean Township, New Jersey. First opened in 1957, it was originally established as the Ocean County Scout Reservation, before becoming the Brookville Scout Reservation. The camp was later named for Joseph A. Citta, Ocean County's first public defender and philanthropist who donated the land to the Boy Scouts to create the scout reservation. It is located in the New Jersey Pine Barrens.

Citta currently has nine campsites that are available year round. The sites are Apache, Seneca, Comanche, Iroquois, Algonquin, Kewe, Chippewa, Mohican, and Mohawk. For Resident Summer camp, two-man canvas tents are provided for camper usage. When summer camp is not in session, people are required to bring their own tent, except in Kewe which has year round lean-tos.
