= North Florida Council =

Scouting organization

- Owner: Boy Scouts of America
- Headquarters: Jacksonville, Florida
- Country: United States
- President: David Boree
- Council Commissioner: Marty Heesacker
- Scout Executive: Kelvin Williams
- Website http://www.nfcscouting.org

The North Florida Council is a local council of the Boy Scouts of America that oversees Scouting in 17 counties of northeast Florida. Through almost 3,000 volunteers the council serves over 7,000 youth in over 327 units. The North Florida Council owns, maintains and operates two camps: Camp Echockotee on Doctors Lake in Orange Park, and Camp Shands near Hawthorne.

== Organization ==
The council is divided into four districts, with each district serving a distinct demographic or geographical area:

- Five Rivers District
- Sabol District
- Bartram Trail District
- St. Johns District

In addition the council operates a division focused on serving youth in urban housing communities:

- Scout Reach Division

== Camps ==
There are two camps in the North Florida Council.

=== St Johns River Base at Echockotee ===
St Johns River Base offers many opportunities for units to come and camp on the shore of Doctor's Lake. Founded in the early 1920s, St Johns River Base has 8 campsites plus multiple pavilions and program areas. Camp is open from September to April, and is closed May through the 1st weekend after Labor Day for Aquatics Camp Operations and Clean Up.

=== Camp Shands ===
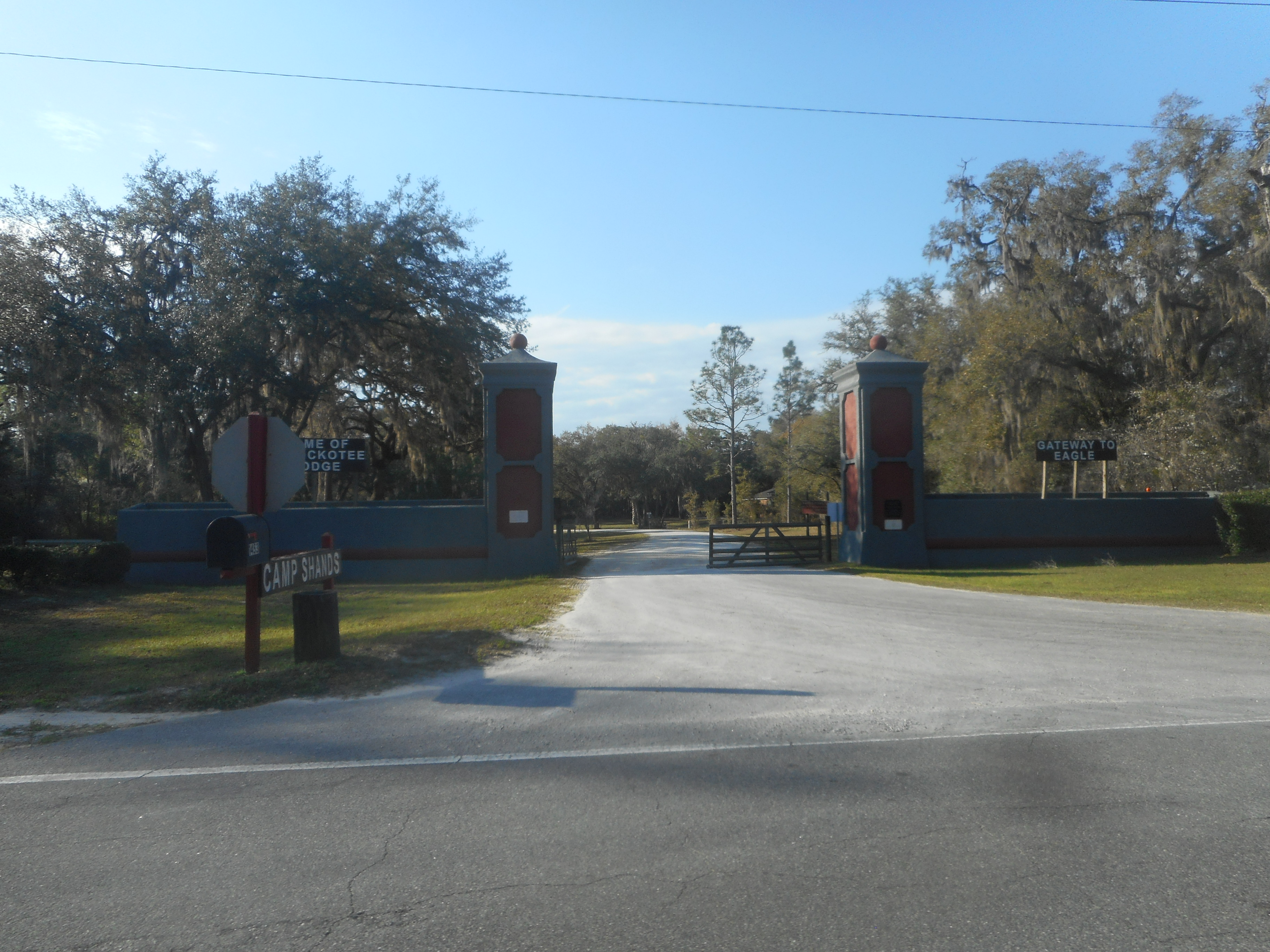
The entrance to Camp Shands northeast of Hawthorne, Florida in Putnam County.

Camp Shands is near Hawthorne, Florida. Camp Shands, located on 1,000 acres (4.0 km^{2}) of diverse Florida terrain. There are 8 focused program areas for every Scout, regardless of their tenure. The Green Bar Bill program is for first year campers.

== Order of the Arrow ==
Echockotee Lodge
- Founded: 1941
- Lodge Adviser: Linda Visman
- Staff Adviser: Eli Rivera
- Website http://www.echockotee.org/

Echockotee Lodge, a chartered Lodge of the National Order of the Arrow, was founded in 1941, with an initial Ordeal held at Camp Echockotee on May 9 of that year. The first Ordeal class of 36 candidates was made up of youth and adults selected by a council committee, for their prior service to Scouting and the Summer Camp program. The initial totem of the fledgling Lodge was the alligator, but in an organizational meetings that summer, the totem was changed to that of the left-handed handclasp, and the name of the camp was adopted as the Lodge name ("Echockotee" is a Seminole word meaning "we are brothers"). For many years the Lodge was active with Summer Camp activities, holding meetings at the end of camp or occasionally at the Seminole Hotel in Jacksonville during the year. Echockotee hosted the first statewide gathering of lodges, called Area Meetings in 1945, 1946 and 1947 (among the first such gatherings in the country). Not until the mid-1950s did regularly scheduled lodge weekends take place away from Summer Camp, as Echockotee does today.

The Lodge undertook a major portion of the maintenance of Camp Echockotee at Fellowships and Service Days, and did the same when the North Florida Council developed Camp Shands as a new summer camp in 1967. Since then, the Lodge has held all of its fellowship weekends at Shands. Besides the work done to make Shands the facility it is today, the Lodge worked hard to dominate many of the inter-lodge competitions held at the Area Conferences, building healthy rivalries and traditions that continue to this day. The development of the Dance Team started in the late 1950s and many members have won awards in the Area (now Section) and National level in this field of competition.

In the 1970s, Echockotee built on its legacy of service with additional fixtures at Camp Shands, building the obstacle course and council ring for Section Conferences hosted by the Lodge in 1978 and 1983. Other facilities at Shands that bear the Stamp of Echockotee involvement are the rifle range, ecology and handicraft buildings, the dining hall and the waterfront shelter. In 2006, 2007 and 2008, the lodge received the National Service Award, which is presented to only 8 lodges in the Order each year for the outstanding quantity and quality of their contributions.

In addition several Echockotee members have been recognized by the National Order of the Arrow Committee for their outstanding service on a Section, Region or National level with the Distinguished Service Award . Those individuals are Kevin Holloway (1977), Jack Butler (1986), Kelly Roberts (1988), Todd Leonard (1994), Greg Hazelhurst (1996), Todd Turner (1998), David Strebler (2000), Courtney Allen (2004), Seth Mollitt (2006), Ed Tudor (2009), and Bradley Austin Kriznar (2018).

== See also ==
- Scouting in Florida
