= Piedmont Council (California) =

Council of the Boy Scouts of America

Piedmont Council (#042)
- Owner: Scouting America
- Headquarters: Piedmont, California
- Location: Piedmont, California
- Country: United States
- Founded: 1921
- Founder: Reverend John Stuchell
- Website piedmontbsa.org

The Piedmont Council (California) of Scouting America is located in the city of Piedmont, in the East Bay hills. Chartered in 1921, the Piedmont Council is geographically the smallest Council in the United States, yet it consistently ranks as one of the highest performing Councils for participation, retention, program quality, and the percentage of Scouts who achieve the rank of Eagle Scout. Programs include Cub Scouts, Scouts BSA (known as Boy Scouts until 2019), Venturing (including the Piedmont Community Service Crew and High Adventure Crew), and Exploring (including Police Explorers Post 911). The Piedmont Council serves about 25% of the youth in Piedmont, and about 1/3 of Scouts are female.

Piedmont Council is one of the four Councils that serves the San Francisco Bay Area.

== History ==
In 1910 the newly formed Piedmont Community Church with the Reverend John Evans Stuchell, first pastor of the church and an avid outdoorsman, was seeking a new type of organization for the boys of Piedmont. He had heard rumors of a new organization inspired by General Baden-Powell in England and decided to start one of his own.

The first organization meeting, held in October 1910, included 25 boys and parents who began a camping tradition every other weekend that sparked a movement that has impacted thousands of youth for generations.

On March 21, 1921, the council was Chartered by The Boy Scouts of America as the 42nd Council.

Timeline

- October 1910 - First recorded Scout meeting and campout in Redwood Canyon; Organized by Reverend John Stuchell, First Pastor of Piedmont Community Church.
- 1921 - Piedmont Council officially chartered with National BSA. The Boy Pioneers established in Piedmont, one of the original models for the National Cub Scout Program
- 1929 – Camp Wallace Alexander was founded. Located on the Spanish Creek, Plumas County, it closed in 1972. It is now a campground operated by the Forest Service.
- 1946 - Sea Scouts Ship 16 "The Revenge" organized.
- 1954 - First Pinewood Derby held in Piedmont
- 1969 - First Scout Tree Lot becomes major Scout fundraiser in 1970, originally organized by the Corpus Christi Men's Club to benefit Troop 6.
- 1971 - Exploring and Sea Scouts become co-ed.
- 1974 - First Venturing Crew: Rowing Post 8 Founded by Edwin E. Liskiss, original organization that became Oakland Strokes
- 1978 - First Career Day organized by Piedmont Council for Piedmont High School
- 2004 - The Piedmont Community Service Crew (PCSC), part of Venturing, was started in Piedmont
- 2005 - 1000th Piedmont Council Scout receives the highest honor, Eagle Rank
- 2013 - Nationally recognized Oakland Strokes Venturing Crew becomes independent from Piedmont Scouting organization
- 2016 - Piedmont Council Awarded #1 out of 273 for Journey to Excellence Performance (JTE)
- 2022 - First female achieves the rank of Eagle Scout

== Order of the Arrow ==
The Hungteetsepoppi Lodge was founded in 1951 at Camp Wallace Alexander.

== See also ==
- Scouting in California
