= Golden Gate Area Council =

California Boy Scout organization

Golden Gate Area Council #023
- Owner: Scouting America
- Headquarters: Pleasanton, California
- Country: United States
- Website ggacbsa.org

The Golden Gate Area Council (GGAC) is a council of Scouting America, formed by a merger of the San Francisco Bay Area Council, Alameda Council, and the Mount Diablo Silverado Council in June 2020. GGAC is one of the five councils that serves the San Francisco Bay Area in California. GGAC includes the counties of Alameda, Contra Costa, Lake, Napa, San Francisco, southern Solano, and the northernmost portion of San Mateo.

The council has headquarters in Pleasanton, California with an Outdoor Programs office in Alameda. The council has retail Trading Posts in both its Alameda and Pleasanton offices. They also have a Trading Post in Fairfield. A Scout Shop in Pleasant Hill is also open for business in the County Square Shopping Center.

== History ==
The council formed with the merger of the San Francisco Bay Area Council, Alameda Council, and the Mount Diablo Silverado Council in June 2020.

== Organization ==
- The council is composed of the following districts:

Alameda Area

Covers the community of Alameda, Bay Farm Island, Castro Valley, Emeryville, Hayward, Oakland, San Leandro & San Lorenzo.

Briones

Covers the communities of Lafayette, Martinez, Moraga, Orinda, Pacheco, Pleasant Hill, and Walnut Creek.

Chief Solano

Covers the communities of Cordelia, Fairfield, Suisun City, and Travis Air Force Base.

Diablo Sunrise

Covers the communities of Antioch, Bay Point, Bethel Island, Brentwood, Byron, Knightsen, Oakley, and Pittsburg.

Golden Gate

Covers the communities of San Francisco, Colma (residential portion), and Daly City (northern half)

Herms

Covers the communities of Albany, Berkeley, and western Contra Costa County including Crockett, North Richmond, El Cerrito, El Sobrante, Hercules, Kensington, Pinole, Richmond, Rodeo, and San Pablo.

Lake

Covers the communities of Clearlake, Clearlake Oaks, Kelseyville, Lakeport, Lower Lake, Lucerne, Middletown, Nice, and Upper Lake.

Meridian

Covers the communities of Alamo, Danville, Diablo, and San Ramon.

Mission Peak

Covers the communities of Fremont, Newark, and Union City.

Peralta

Covers the communities of Oakland and Emeryville.

Silverado

Covers the communities of American Canyon, Angwin, Benicia, Calistoga, Napa, St. Helena, Vallejo, and Yountville.

Twin Valley

Covers the communities of Dublin, Livermore, Pleasanton, and Sunol.

== Camps ==
The council camps are as follows:

- Camp Herms (established 1930)
- Rancho Los Mochos (established 1944)
- Camp Royaneh (established 1925)
- Wente Scout Reservation (established 1959)
- Camp Wolfeboro (established 1928)

== Order of the Arrow ==
- Achewon Nimat Lodge #282 was formed on December 13, 1964 by the merger of Machek N'Gult Lodge 375 of the Oakland Area Council and Royaneh Lodge 282 of the San Francisco Area Council. Although the Oakland Council and the San Francisco Council merged in February 1964, it was not until the end of the year that the Order of the Arrow lodges merged. The official date of the Lodge Charter is January 1, 1965.
- Kaweah Lodge 379, Order of the Arrow, was chartered to the Alameda Council in February 1948, and has served local Scouting continuously over the past 68 years. Our lodge consists of over 80 youth and adult Arrowmen serving Scouting and the Alameda community.
- In 1994, Oo Yum Buli Lodge #468 merged with Swegedaigea Lodge #263 to form the New Lodge Ut-In Sélica Lodge #58. The new Lodge’s name means “Twin Spirits” in the Costanoan language, and the new Lodge flap echoes that by including images of the former Lodge totems, the Golden Eagle and the Golden Hawk. The new Lodge chose the California Grizzly Bear as its new totem, and it also appears on the Lodge flap.

In January 2021, Yerba Buena Lodge #719 was formed by the merger of Achewon Nimat, Kaweah and Ut-In Selica lodges. The lodge number was selected by summing the former individual lodge numbers Achewon Nimat (282), Kaweah (379) and Ut-In Selica (58)

== Wolfeboro Pioneers ==

The Wolfeboro Pioneers is one of the last surviving local BSA honor societies in the United States that has not been absorbed by the Order of the Arrow, the others being Tribe of Mic-O-Say, Firecrafter, and Tribe of Tahquitz. The Wolfeboro Pioneers is a Boy Scout camping honor society based out of Camp Wolfeboro near Arnold, California. The society was founded in the summer of 1929 by returning Scouts and Scouters who were devoted to creating and preserving the camp's unique tradition. An insight into the society in 1996 is given by a Scouter on the Scouts-L list.

Beginning in the 1930s, the Order of the Arrow absorbed many of the small Scouts BSA honor societies that had thrived during Scouting's first two decades. This happened in 1944 in Silverado Council. The Order of the Arrow established itself in Mt. Diablo Council in the early 1950s.

Each summer, the organization inducts several adult leaders and approximately 100 Scouts. Members originate from California, other U.S. states, and international locations.

=== Election procedures ===
Since then, individuals have been inducted into the society through election. Eligible Scouts are nominated by the Scoutmaster and elected by their troop. The number of Scouts eligible per troop depends on the number of Scouts in the troop rounded up to the closest tenth then divided by ten (i.e. if the troop size is 30, then three Scouts are eligible, if 21 then still three Scouts are eligible). Elections are conducted by teams of Pioneer members (usually uniformed) who disperse throughout the various campsites. The Pioneers are responsible for reading and explaining the election procedures to the assembled Scouts. The Scoutmaster has the ability to veto the troop's decision. Votes are then taken back to Pioneer Rock where they are counted by Pioneer officials.

Originally only the initial returning Scouts were "pioneers" and for a number of years no one was added to their number. The society realized that if they were to survive it would be necessary to induct new members who possessed the same spirit of the original pioneers. The original procedure was that if a Scout met the requirements described above and had worked on at least one pioneer sponsored work party, then he was eligible for nomination. Prior to the final campfire of the week the pioneers would gather on pioneer rock and nominate candidates and plead their case. Upon end of discussion, a vote would be taken.

To be eligible for candidacy, Scouts must have spent two weeks at Camp Wolfeboro, one of which must have been in a previous year. They must have held (or be holding) a position in their troop that is on the approved list for Eagle within the Boy Scout Handbook 11th edition, p. 446. They must also be First Class rank or above and have Scoutmaster approval before eligibility can take effect.

Some troops, due to unusual size or other quality, amend these eligibility rules. For example, some troops choose to nominate only Scouts that are Star or higher.

Scouters/parents must be nominated by a member of the troop they are camping with. The nomination must be seconded, and thirded by individuals present at the Friday afternoon Pioneer meeting. The only requirement for adults is that they have spent two weeks at Camp Wolfeboro, one of which must have been in a previous year..

=== Ceremony ===
Shortly after the final dinner on Friday night, Scouts assemble at Bravo How campfire circle at the foot of Pioneer Rock. The ceremony begins with the Pioneer historian giving a short history of the camp and the organization. After that, the Pioneers, assembled on the rock, lead the Scouts seated on the logs below in singing the traditional song, "Patsy Ory Ory Ay." When this is completed, the Pioneers slip away and form a ladder on either side of the trail leading to the main campfire circle. In a matter of minutes, the Scouts, Scouters, and parents who have come to watch the event form a column behind a number of Pioneer torchbearers who lead the way to the main campfire circle. The Pioneers lining the parade route hold their fingers in the Scout Sign and stand at rigid attention to signal the somber nature of the event and to call for observance of its importance through absolute silence. The Scouts are seated and the Pioneers disperse and retreat to the second Pioneer Rock, situated so that it overlooks the main campfire circle. The Pioneer Sergeant-at-Arms, breaking the silence, decrees in a booming voice: "Let The Fires Of Friendship Burn!" The campfires are then lit and, for the next hour, Scout troops perform songs and skits for the assembled crowd. After the skits have finished, the Calling-Out Ceremony begins. The Pioneers form a human "ladder" that runs from the stage to the top of Pioneer Rock. Each Scout is called out and is helped up the ladder to the top of Pioneer Rock. Along the way, they are congratulated by current members. After the ceremony ends, they embark on an initiation process that takes until the early hours of the morning.

=== Duties ===
The Wolfeboro Pioneers' official mission is to preserve and improve Camp Wolfeboro and its traditions. To this end, the Wolfeboro Pioneers assist in the opening and closing of camp each summer, as well as assisting in multiple service projects throughout most summers (in addition to the Camp Wolfeboro Workparty each Tuesday evening). Examples of the work the Pioneers have done include the maintenance of the road into camp, as well as the refurbishments of the dining hall in recent years. The Pioneers are also responsible for at least 90% of the trails within camp.

A second duty of the Wolfeboro Pioneers involves the preservation of the history of Camp Wolfeboro through the creation and maintenance of the Pioneer scrapbooks, as well as the writing and printing of "Wolfeboro Sings", the official songbook. The scrapbooks are currently updated through the summer of 1998 and contain photos, clippings, and patches from the camp's history. Currently (as of June 2007) the Pioneers are actively working on updating the Camp Wolfeboro history since 2000 in the scrapbooks, as well as pursuing a new edition of "Wolfeboro Sings."

There are three Pioneer rocks. One in the center of camp, one at the main campfire circle and a third secret one. No one is permitted to walk on the rock unless they are a Pioneer.

=== Apparel ===
The official color of the Wolfeboro Pioneers is "Pioneer Blue," which currently most closely resembles azure. The actual color of the Pioneers has varied considerably over the 75+ year history, ranging from teal to darker royal blue. Many pieces of Pioneer apparel have been created over the years since 1929, including t-shirts, polos, neckerchieves, and fleece jackets. As well, a large variety of patches, designed primarily for the temporary insignia location on the right breast pocket of the Boy Scout uniform, have been issued, most of which can be viewed at camp in the Pioneer scrapbooks.

== See also ==
- Scouting in California
