= Southwest Florida Council =

Local council of the Boy Scouts of America

- Owner: Boy Scouts of America
- Location: Fort Myers, Florida
- Country: United States
- Coordinates: 26.5827801,-81.8762809
- Founded: 1968
- Scout Executive: Charles Vonderheid
- Website http://www.swflcouncilbsa.org

Southwest Florida Council serves Charlotte, Collier, Lee, Manatee, Sarasota and parts of DeSoto and Hendry counties. The Southwest Florida Council was chartered in July 1968, and based on membership and units, it ranks 46th out of 306 councils in the United States. The Southwest Florida Council is a geographic area divided into four districts: Alligator, Manatee, Panther, and Two Rivers. The council has an executive board of volunteers and a staff of professionals.

The council accomplishes its mission by making its program available to chartered organizations; existing organizations that have compatible goals. These groups include religious, educational, civic fraternal, business, labor, and governmental bodies. The council supports chartered organizations by providing materials and certain facilities, such as camps. The chartered organizations organize the packs and troops.

== Organization ==
The Southwest Florida Council consists of four localized districts:

- Alligator District
- Manatee District
- Panther District
- Two Rivers District

== Camps ==
=== Price-Sanders Scout Reservation ===
The Price-Sanders Scout Reservation (PSSR) is a section of land one mile wide and two miles deep (1280 acres), located at the northeast corner of the Cecil M. Webb Wildlife Management Area. The land has been rented from the Florida FWC since the council was founded in 1968. Since then, approximately $2 million has been invested by the council into the site.

==== Dr. Franklin Miles Camp ====
Dr. Franklin Miles Camp, or Camp Miles, is the primary camp located on the Price-Sanders Scout Reservation. The camp has numerous resources, including "a central dining hall, individual troop campsites, a health lodge, a trading post, archery, rifle and shotgun ranges, a chapel by the lake, and ecology lodge, a central heated shower facility, a training lodge, a swimming pool, [and] a boating island for aquatics." The camp also contains a COPE Course and climbing wall. There are nine troop campsites, named after Native American tribes: Apache, Cherokee, Mohawk, Calusa, Seminole, Delaware, Delasioux (named for being between Delaware and Sioux), Sioux, and Miccosukee.

==== Camp Gannet / Cub Scout Family Camp ====
Camp Gannet (more commonly known as the Cub Scout Family Camp) is a Cub Scout campground. It features a circle of twelve campsites surrounding a central shower and bathroom building. Five of these sites have water and electric hookups for RVs. The camp shares many resources with its parent camp, Camp Miles, including the swimming pool and ranges.

=== Camp Flying Eagle ===
Camp Flying Eagle was founded in 1929. Camp Flying Eagle is located in near Bradenton, Florida.

== Osceola Lodge (Order of the Arrow) ==
Osceola Lodge 564
- Owner: Southwest Florida Council
- Founded: 1968
- Website http://www.osceola564.org

Osceola Lodge 564 is one of eight Order of the Arrow Lodges in Section E-5 formally known as S-4 (all of Florida except the Panhandle, and south Georgia). Osceola Lodge was founded in 1968.

Chapters

- Hvlpatah Tastanagi Chapter
- Oscen Tustenuggee Chapter
- Tukosee Mathla Chapter
- Yaha Hajo Chapter

== See also ==
- Scouting in Florida
- Boy Scouts of America
- Southwest Florida
