= Redwood Empire Council =

Scouting America council in California

Redwood Empire Council #041
- Old Redwood Empire Council CSP
- Owner: Boy Scouts of America
- Headquarters: Santa Rosa, California
- Country: United States
- Founded: 1919
- President: Randy Huffman
- Council Commissioner: Peter Carlson
- Scout Executive: Charles Howard-Gibbon
- Website; Official website

Redwood Empire Council is the local council of Scouting America that serves youth and families in Mendocino and Sonoma counties in California.

The Petaluma Area Council #041 (originally Petaluma Council) was founded in 1919, and served the cities/towns of Petaluma, Sonoma, Cotati, and adjacent unincorporated communities. In 1943, it expanded through a territory transfer with the Silverado Area Council (at this time adding Mendocino County and northern Sonoma County area). At that time, the PAC voted to rename itself the Sonoma-Mendocino Area Council.

The Redwood Area Council #044 was founded in 1923. Following the recommendation of a 1991 Western Region council realignment study, the Redwood Area Council agreed to merge with the Sonoma-Mendocino Area Council in 1992, and at that time SMAC #041 added the board members of the RAC and voted to rename the larger council Redwood Empire Council.

In early 2012, Scouting in Humboldt and Del Norte Counties were reassigned to Crater Lake Council (Oregon), while Redwood Empire Council retained the Scouting programs in Sonoma and Mendocino Counties.

Redwood Empire Council celebrated its 2019 Centennial Year with seven major events held throughout the year. The regular events enhanced for the Centennial included the Council Recognition Dinner, Distinguished Citizen Dinner, Gala and Auction, and Order of the Arrow Lodge Dinner. The three special activities in 2019 included a Centennial Eagle Scout Reunion, Centennial in the Park (Petaluma), and a Centennial Council Camporee.

In February 2025, the full council membership voted 34-10 to approve a merger agreement with the Golden Gate Area Council (GGAC), and GGAC approved the merger in March 2025. Integration of Redwood Empire Council volunteers and staff into GGAC, but final corporate merger has not finalized by the California Secretary of State as of August 2025.

== Organization ==
- Miwok District (southern Sonoma County chartered organizations)
- Pomo District (northern Sonoma County chartered organizations)
- Yokayo-Logger District (Mendocino County chartered organizations)

== Camps ==
=== Camp Navarro (formerly Camp Masonite Navarro) ===
Camp Navarro
- Location: Mendocino County, California
- Coordinates: 39°10′8.52″N 123°34′8.22″W
- Website www.campnavarro.com

Camp Navarro is located near Navarro in Mendocino County, California.

Camp Navarro began as a lumber camp of the Albion Lumber Company. A spur of the Fort Bragg and Southeastern Railroad from Albion to the mill at Wendling (now Navarro) and Christine (now Floodgate) ran through the camp and up Neefus Creek. There was a "Y" for turning engines around that is still vaguely visible in camp, A piece of rail and large chain are also some railroad remnants that are displayed in front of the dining hall. Lumbering and the railroad stopped in the 1920s but notches cut in redwoods for springboards, can still be seen in the Mohawk campsite and outside of the staff shower area. Goosepens, circles of redwoods sprouted from the roots of cut trees, are throughout the camp. All but one of the portable buildings, built on skids to be moved from camp to camp have disappeared. The one that remains is used as a tool shed. Part of a water tank on skids can also be seen.

The camp was used as a Civilian Conservation Corps camp during the Depression, and as an army camp at the start of World War II. When acquired by Scouting it still had a row of decrepit plywood barracks along the river side of the parade ground. The lumber camp buildings on skids were used as Scout camp staff quarters for a number of years.

When Camp Navarro opened in 1956 the Adirondack shelters were built. Many of these same structures remain today. The current craft lodge is all that remains of the original dining hall. The foundation of a metal flagpole is still visible where the "55 Navarro Salute" cannon once stood. A wood-frame dam was erected on the North Fork of the Navarro River each summer to create a swimming area; in 1965 it gave way and the practice of building a gravel dam began. The gravel dam has not been built since 2001, however.

In late 1955, the land became the property of The Masonite Corporation. For 17 years, Masonite leased the camp to the Sonoma-Mendocino Area Council BSA for one dollar per year. Masonite sold Camp Navarro to the Sonoma-Mendocino Area Council on August 29, 1973, for one dollar, and it was renamed Camp Masonite Navarro. The camp later added a summer program for Cub Scouts that lasted four days.

In 2012, Redwood Empire Council sold Camp Masonite Navarro to Navarro Stewards LLC for $1.4 million, with the mortgage note carried by the council. Since 2001 environmental regulations prevented the damming of the North Fork of the Navarro River. Without a waterfront the camp was unable to attract Scouts to fill enough summer camp sessions to keep the camp solvent. As a result, the camp became a financial burden that caused the council to run a deficit and go into debt. The camp was sold, and the new owners returned to using the original name of Camp Navarro. The council carried the mortgage note for the new owners, so the financial obligation is not yet paid off.

=== Camp Noyo ===
Camp Noyo
- Location: Mendocino County, California
- Coordinates: 39°25′29.48″N 123°36′41.22″W
- Website https://campingonthenoyo.com/

Camp Noyo is a camp on the Noyo River in Mendocino County, California. The camp was a forger logging camp leased from Union Pacific Lumber (later purchased) to the Silverado Area Council in 1933. In 1943, it was transferred to the Sonoma-Mendocino Area Council in 1943. The SMAC, then later the Redwood Empire Council, offered a summer program for Scouts that consisted of two to three one-week sessions.

In the late 1950s, the Scout summer camp program transferred to Camp Navarro, but Camp Noyo was still used for Explorer camps. The Scout summer camp program was restarted in 2009. In 2012, the camp was sold to the family of a former board member, and the family rents it back to the council for two weeks of Scout summer camp and weekend events.

The council holds Noyo Family Camp Adventure Weekend, a three-day camping adventure for Scout families, and two sessions of Scouts BSA summer camp, utilizing an all volunteer staff. Scouts and Scouters enter and leave the camp normally by riding the California Western Railroad "Skunk Train" which also runs along the Noyo River.

== Order of the Arrow ==
Orca Lodge
- Headquarters: Santa Rosa, California
- Location: Sonoma County, California
- Country: United States
- Founded: 1994
- Website https://www.orca194.org/

Orca Lodge 194 was formed from the merger of the Mow-A-Toc Lodge 262 (of the Redwood Area Council) and the Cabrosha Lodge 537 (of the Sonoma Mendocino Area Council).

The Orca Lodge consists of the three chapters, one for each of the council's districts. Orca Lodge has won several recognitions from the National Order of the Arrow, and is consistently earning recognition in the O.A. Journey to Excellence program.

== See also ==
- Scouting in California
