= Monmouth Council =

Scouting America council

- Owner: Scouting America
- Headquarters: Morganville, New Jersey
- Location: Monmouth County, New Jersey
- Country: United States
- Founded: 1917
- President: Thomas W. Scott FACHE
- Council Commissioner: Robert T. Kee III
- Interim Scout Executive: Bray B. Barnes
- Website https://www.monmouthcouncilscouting.org

Monmouth Council, Scouting America, established in 1917, serves all of Monmouth County, New Jersey and ten eastern townships of Middlesex County, New Jersey. The Council was the starting point for the landmark US Supreme Court case Boy Scouts of America v. Dale.

== Organization ==
The council is divided into 4 districts:

- Middlesex
- Battleground
- Twin Lights
- Thunderbird

== Forestburg Scout Reservation ==
Forestburg Scout Reservation
- Location: Forestburgh, New York
- Coordinates: 41.527314°N 74.744329°W
- Camp size: 1277 acres
- Founded: 1956
- Founder: J.Fred Billet/E.Donald Sterner
- Ranger: George Kaiser
- Assistant Ranger: Josh Regan
- Camp Director: David Ritchie
- Program Director: "Trader" Joe Davis
- Website https://monmouthcouncilscouting.org/fsr

Forestburg Scout Reservation is a Scouting America camp in Forestburgh, Sullivan County, New York. The property offers summer camp and year-round camping in two distinct but connected camps: J. Fred Billett Camp and Dan Beard Camp.

=== History ===
The first summer camp session was held in 1956, following the initial land purchase of the 635-acre (2.57 km^{2}) estate of Dr. Thomas Darlington, the former health commissioner for New York City. In 1965, an additional 600-acre (2.4 km^{2}) was purchased from the Metauk Rod & Gun Club. Unlike its sister camp, FSR does not feature a "theme".

=== Notable locations ===
- Burnt Hope Lake, a manmade lake originally named Hope Lake after the Hope Lumber Company, It was renamed after fires in 1805 and 1864 put the company out of business.
- Darlington Falls
- Tecumseh Rock

=== Programs ===
- Environmental Conservation
- Field Sports: shooting-related merit badges
- Frontier Camp: for younger Scouts working towards Tenderfoot, Second Class and First Class ranks
- Handicraft
- Scoutcraft: pioneering and outdoor skills
- Technology Center: science related badges; also the home of the W2FSR amateur radio station
- Waterfront: swimming and boating on Burnt Hope Lake

== Quail Hill Scout Reservation ==
Quail Hill Scout Reservation
- Location: Manalapan, New Jersey
- Coordinates: 40.264730°N 74.391899°W
- Founded: 1965
- Founders: J. Fred Billet; E.Donald Sterner
- Ranger: Adam Schumard
- Camp Director: Dawn Lilenfeld-Saada
- Program Director: Claire Russo
- Website http://monmouthcouncilscouting.org/qhsr

The Quail Hill property, now encompassing 250 acres, was purchased in 1964 from sisters Elizabeth and Grace LeValley. It was previously a working farm. Early maps show barns, a corn crib, and orchards, and even today foundation stones from the old buildings can be seen. It was intended to replace Camp Housman, which the council purchased in the 1940s. Camp Housman was too small and swampy for the kind of programs the council wanted to implement, such as extensive training courses and enhanced Cub Scout camping and activities.

Chet Fromm was tapped to develop the farm into a proper Scouting America camp. Fromm was a retired soldier and a director of training at Camp Housman and a District Executive. He served as the first ranger, retiring in 1983. Subsequent rangers were George Leidy, John Herlihy, Randy Blades, Jim Mechkowski and the current ranger is Adam Schumard.

Between 1964 and 1967 the camp roads, parking lots, the campfire bowl, the all faiths chapel, and the Webelos and Scout lodges were all constructed. The pond was also enlarged and the farm fields were converted to grass to create the activities fields. The camp was dedicated on 7 October 1967. That weekend also was host to the first camp activity, a huge council camporee. Car traffic was backed up all the way to Route 33.

Quail Hill was the first camp in the former Northeast Region to offer a Cub Scout day camp, and it continues to do so with a summer program featuring both day and resident overnight camping for Cubs and Webelos. Throughout the remainder of the year, thousands of Scouts participate in Klondike derbies, camporees, Order of the Arrow events, unit campouts, courts of honor, campfires, picnics, and training courses.

In 1975 the Na Tsi Hi Lodge opened the eleven mile Battle of Monmouth Historic Trail which begins at Quail Hill in western Monmouth county, New Jersey. Hikers pass through important points relating to the Battle of Monmouth and end in Freehold, New Jersey. Scout units hike the trail Saturdays between Labor Day and Memorial Day.

Later additions included the pool and shower house, the ranger's house and shops, the BB and archery ranges, and program shelters at the Hogan (Webelos) lodge and McDowell (Scout) lodge. The farm’s garage was renovated to become Devlin Lodge, More recently, the Lawrence Training Center and a flush toilet facility were added. Lass Lodge was built on the site of the original LeValley farmhouse, which was demolished in the late 1990s.

In 2012, the reservation lost over 1,000 trees and facilities were significantly damaged by Hurricane Sandy. Council Troops aided with a mass cleanup response.

== Prior campgrounds ==
=== Camp Burton ===
A summer camp located in Ocean County, New Jersey on the south side of the Metedeeonk River, it was named in memory of Mrs. George Housman's son, George Burton. In 1924, Mrs. George Housman donated $5000 to the council. In 1929, the council rented "Camp Burton at Allaire" on Allaire state park village. When the Allaire land became available, the original Camp Burton was dissolved and sold to a company named the Van Ness Corp, in 1930. The council had a 21-year lease for $1 a year from Arthur Brisbane. However, following his death the lease was not renewed and the campground reverted to estate.

== Na Tsi Hi Lodge ==
Na Tsi Hi Lodge
- Founded: 1950
- Membership: 422
- Lodge Chief: Colin Sales
- Lodge Adviser: Chris Harris
- Staff Adviser: Bray B. Barnes
- Website https://www.natsihi.org

The Na Tsi Hi Lodge is the Council member of Order of the Arrow in Section E17. It supports the Scouting program through leadership, camping, and service.
