= Gulf Stream Council =

Boy scouts area council

- Owner: Boy Scouts of America
- Headquarters: Palm Beach Gardens, Florida
- Country: United States
- Coordinates: 26°47′57″N 80°06′26″W
- Founded: 1914
- President: Karen Donnelly
- Council Commissioner: David Sunderman
- Scout Executive: Terrence Hamilton
- Website; Gulfstreamcouncil.org

Gulf Stream Council is a council of the Boy Scouts of America in southeast Florida with the headquarters in Palm Beach Gardens. Founded in 1914, the Gulf Stream Council serves Scouts in Palm Beach, Martin, St. Lucie, Indian River, Okeechobee, Glades and Hendry counties. Throughout its area, it serves over 24,000 youth.

== Organization ==
A district is a small area within a council of the Boy Scouts of America. The Gulf Stream Council currently has six Districts. All of the districts in the Gulf Stream Council have an associated Order of the Arrow chapter as part of Aal-Pa-Tah Lodge.

=== Big Lake District ===
Big Lake District, formerly known as Okeechobee District, serves Scouts in Glades, Hendry, and Okeechobee, as well as western Palm Beach County. The Order of the Arrow chapter associated with Big Lake District is known as Panasofee. As of 2023, Big Lake District has been merged into Sailfish District.

=== Everglades District ===
Everglades District serves Scouts from southern Palm Beach County from Southern Blvd south to the Broward County Line. The Order of the Arrow chapter associated with Everglades District is Abaniki.

=== Indian River District ===
Indian River District serves Scouts throughout Indian River County. The Order of the Arrow chapter of Indian River District is called Lowaneu Mawat.

=== Lighthouse District ===
Lighthouse District is a district that serves Scouts in north Palm Beach County from Southern Blvd to the Martin County border. The Order of the Arrow chapter associated with Lighthouse District is Wyhome-Pa-Tah.

=== Sailfish District ===
Sailfish District serves Scouts throughout Martin County. The Order of the Arrow chapter associated with Sailfish District is Nekiwa.

Sailfish District maintains a website (located at sailfishdistrict.org) where local Scout units and Scouters can be found, as well as information regarding district events.

=== Treasure Coast District ===
Treasure Coast District serves Scouts throughout St. Lucie County. The Order of the Arrow chapter associated with Treasure Coast District is Oiyatah.

=== Inactive districts ===
- Seminole District
- Manatee District was a district that served Scouts in Lake Worth and Boynton Beach in Palm Beach County. However, Manatee District merged with Osceola and Trade Winds District in May 2009. Manatee District also had an Order of the Arrow chapter which was called Coowachobee.
- Tradewinds District served Scouts from forest hill blvd to 45th street split in August 2013. Its southern half merged with Osceola and formed Everglades District and its Northern half joined Lighthouse District. It also had an Order of the Arrow Chapter call Chee-Pa-Tah.
- Osceola District merged with the southern half of Tradewinds District in August 2013 to form Everglades District

== Camps ==
The Gulf Stream Council has three camps, ranging in size from 1 square mile (2.6 km^{2}) to just a few acres. There is also Scout Hill, which is a small area in Palm Beach County, however, it is not completely owned by the Gulf Stream Council.

=== Tanah Keeta Scout Reservation ===
Tanah Keeta Scout Reservation
- Location: Tequesta, Florida
- Founded: 1952
- Ranger: Steve Steinmetz
- Ranger: Harlan Pierce

Tanah Keeta Scout Reservation or usually Tanah Keeta, is the main and largest campground of the Gulf Stream Council. Tanah Keeta is a word in Hitchiti, which translates in English to, "the gathering place". Along with the adjacent Jonathan Dickinson State Park, it was originally a part of Camp Murphy, a World War II Army Camp. It is about 1 square mile (2.6 km^{2}) in size. In addition, Tanah Keeta is adjacent a Girl Scout camp, called Camp Welaka. Tanah Keeta Scout Reservation is divided roughly in half into two camps, Camp Loxahatchee and Camp Clear Lake. A summer camp program has been held at Tanah Keeta in June and July since the summer of 1957. The property was deeded to the Gulf Stream Council in 1953.

==== Tanah Keeta Grace ====
May this food nourish our bodies,
May life give us a smile,
May the adventure always be with us,
and may Tanah Keeta remain in our hearts all the while. Amen

==== Camp Loxahatchee ====
Camp Loxahatchee is on the western half of Tanah Keeta. It is more utilized than Camp Clear Lake, as it includes the Dining Hall, the Pool, COPE, the Climbing Tower, the Trading Post, and more campsites than Camp Clear Lake. The name is derived from the Loxahatchee River, which is adjacent to the camp.

==== Camp Clear Lake ====
Clear Lake covers the eastern half of Tanah Keeta Scout Reservation. Camp Clear Lake is a mostly primitive type campground, as opposed to Camp Loxahatchee. The title of Camp "Clear Lake" is derived from a small lake in the southeastern corner of Tanah Keeta, which has the name "Clear Lake". In 1957 the first summer camp at Tanah Keeta was held in Camp Clear Lake.

==== The Mike Machek Trail ====
The Mike Machek Trail is a 5.2 mile self-guided trail in the heart of Tanah Keeta. Within the one mile area of camp can be found almost every kind of topographical feature indictive to South Florida. This trail travels through them all. Originally developed by its founder Clayton Jones in 1984, he spent 3 and a half years planning the trail. The trail opened for use in the Fall of 1988. Currently the trail is maintained by various units and most construction projects are conducted by the Order of the Arrow Trail Care Crew.

=== Oklawaha Scout Reservation ===
Oklawaha Scout Reservation
- Location: Sebastian, Florida
- Founded: 1953
- Ranger: Bill Molnar

Oklawaha Scout Reservation is also known as Oklawaha, but sometimes referred to as OK, is a 60-acre (240,000 m^{2}) site in Sebastian, Indian River County, on the banks of the Oklawaha River. Donated by Anna Vern Smith in memory of her husband Claude in 1953, Oklawaha is a scrub oak flatland which includes a swimming area, canoe launch into the river, amphitheater, large meeting/dining hall pavilion, archery/BB range and chapel.

=== Camp Dark Hammock ===
Camp Dark Hammock is leased by the Gulf Stream Council to provide a Florida wilderness camping for Troops, Crews, or Explorer Posts only. It is located northeast of Okeechobee in Okeechobee County.

=== Scout Hill ===
Scout Hill is a small area of the John Prince Memorial Park Campground in Lake Worth, Florida. It was known as Camp Osborne until about 1952. In 1952 most of Camp Osborne was sold to Palm Beach County to create the campground of John Prince Memorial Park. The small area that remained was renamed "Scout Hill".

== Aal-Pa-Tah Lodge ==
Aal-Pa-Tah Lodge
- Location: Tanah Keeta Scout Reservation
- Founded: 1942
- Lodge Co-Chiefs: Ethan S. and Sebastian W.
- Lodge Adviser: Sharon Webb
- Staff Adviser: Tess English
- Website www.aalpatah.org

Aal-Pa-Tah Lodge #237 is the Order of the Arrow lodge associated with the Gulf Stream Council. The lodge building is located in Tanah Keeta Scout Reservation in Tequesta, Florida. Aal-Pa-Tah is one of seven OA lodges in Section E5 (formerly S-4), which covers a majority of Florida and southern Georgia. The word "Aal-Pa-Tah" is word from the Leni Lenape language that translates to Alligator in English.

=== History ===
The lodge was founded 1942 during World War II; then from 1945 to 1947, on the list of lodge chiefs says "WWII". There were only two or three chapters when Aal-Pa-Tah was founded in 1942. Aal-Pa-Tah Lodge held the title as the best all-around lodge in 2008, 2009, 2012, and 2016.

==== Section S-4 Events ====
Aal-Pa-Tah has hosted a number of Section S-4 events. Aal-Pa-Tah Lodge has hosted section conference for Section S-4 in 1953, 1962, 1972, 1981, 1988, 1997, 2004, 2011, 2019. The lodge also hosted section seminars in 2000 and 2008. The lodge hosted revamped seminars entitled Section Leadership Summit (SLS) in 2014.

==== Section Renaming ====
As part of Project Magellan, the Order of the Arrow implemented changes to its national and regional structure which went in effect at the OA National Planning Meeting on December 28, 2021. The new name for the section became E5.

==== Section E5 Events ====
The Lodge will host Section Conference in 2026. It also hosted Section Leadership Summit in 2024.

=== Chapters ===
As mentioned above each district has an OA Chapter. Lodges usually divide into chapters which will usually corresponding to districts within the council. The chapter is led by the elected youth chapter chief, a volunteer adult is appointed as the adviser and the district executive is the professional (staff) adviser. The following names are the names of Aal-Pa-Tah's Chapters:

- Wyhome-Pa-Tah is the chapter of Lighthouse District.
- Pan-A-So-Fee is the chapter of Okeechobee District.[3]
- A-Bani-Ki is the chapter of Everglades District.[15]
- Ne-Kee-Wa is the chapter of Sailfish District.[16]
- Oi-Ya-Tah is the chapter of Treasure Coast District
- Lowaneu Mawat is the chapter of Indian River District

==== Defunct Chapters ====
Coo-Wa-Chobee was the OA Chapter of Manatee District until 2009. In 2009 it merged with A-Bani-Ki and Chee-Pa-Tah Chapters, because the Manatee District split and merged with the Osceola and Trade Winds Districts. Coo-Wa-Chobee was awarded the best chapter all around award for 2008. Chee-Pa-Tah was the chapter of Tradewinds District until 2013 when the district split and merged with Osceola and Lighthouse.

== See also ==
- Scouting in Florida
