= Sequoia Council =

Local council of the Boy Scouts of America

Sequoia Council #027
- Owner: Scouting America
- Headquarters: Fresno, California
- Location: Fresno, California
- Country: United States
- Founded: 1919
- President: John Marshall
- Council Commissioner: Mark Millett
- Website https://sequoiacouncil.org

(not to be confused with the Sequoyah Council located in Tennessee and Virginia)

The Sequoia Council (council #027) is a local council of Scouting America serving Fresno, Madera, Kings, and Tulare Counties in California. Founded in 1919 as the Fresno Council, it adopted its current name in 1925. In 1992, the Mount Whitney Area Council (#054) merged into Sequoia Council, expanding its geographic footprint across the southern San Joaquin Valley. The council was also the first in California to sponsor an all-girl Cub Scout pack.

== Organization ==
The council is divided into four districts: the San Joaquin District, the Thunderbird District, the Riverbend District, and the Live Oak District.

== Camps ==
The council operates Camp Chawanakee, its primary camping facility.

== Order of the Arrow ==
The council's Order of the Arrow chapter is Tah-Heetch Lodge #195.

== Notable Scouts and Supporters ==
Several notable individuals have been associated with the Sequoia Council. Amanda Bales of Clovis became the first female to earn the rank of Eagle Scout within the council. Bob Ludekens of Visalia was depicted in the 1947 Norman Rockwell painting "All Together". Leon S. Peters of Fresno served as president of the Central California War Industries company during the Second World War and was a prominent supporter of the council.

== See also ==
- Scouting in California
