= Middle Tennessee Council =

Local council of the Boy Scouts of America

Middle Tennessee Council (#560)
- Owner: Boy Scouts of America
- Headquarters: Nashville, Tennessee
- Country: United States
- Founded: 1920
- Council President: Dr John Bright Cage
- Council Commissioner: Karen Bengston
- Scout Executive: Larry Brown
- Website www.mtcbsa.org

The Middle Tennessee Council is a local council of the Boy Scouts of America in Tennessee, with headquarters in Nashville. It serves 37 Middle Tennessee counties and Fort Campbell, Kentucky.

== History ==
The Nashville Council was founded in 1920 and was renamed the Nashville Area Council in 1929. In 1927 the Davy Crockett Council was created and eventually merged with the Nashville Area Council. The Nashville Area Council was renamed the Middle Tennessee Council in 1949.

In 1921, the Middle Tennessee Council's first summer camp was held at the original Boxwell Reservation, near Linton and is now lost to history. Nine years later, camp was held at a facility called as the Narrows of the Harpeth. In the 1950s and early 1960s, this camp was operated for African American troops. The camp was eventually sold to the state of Tennessee in the 1980s.

In 1950, another Boxwell opened near Rock Island (between McMinnville and Sparta that was operated from 1950 through 1959 and is still being maintained as the Charles E. Parish Wilderness Reservation.

In 1959, the current Boxwell opened on Old Hickory Lake near Lebanon, TN.

== Organization ==
The council is divided into thirteen districts:

- Bledsoe Creek, consisting of Robertson and Sumner counties
- Caney Fork District, consisting of Clay, Dekalb, Jackson, Overton, Putnam, Van Buren, Warren and White Counties
- Centennial District, consisting of Northern Davidson County
- Cogioba District, consisting of Houston, Montgomery and Stewart Counties and Fort Campbell, KY
- Cumberland River District, consisting of Macon, Smith, Trousdale, Wilson Counties
- Elk River District, consisting of Bedford, Coffee, Franklin, Lincoln and Moore Counties
- Frontier District, consisting of Giles, Lawrence, Lewis, Marshall, Maury, Perry and Wayne Counties
- Highland Rim District, consisting of Cheatham, Dickson, Hickman and Humphreys Counties
- James E. West District, consisting of Southwest Davidson County
- Natchez Trace District, consisting of Williamson County
- Percy Priest District, consisting of Southeast Davidson County
- STEM District, Council wide
- Trail of Tears District, consisting of Rutherford and Cannon Counties

On August 19, 2020, the council hosted a District Alignment Study live webinar. If the proposed changes are voted on by the Council Executive Board, the number of district realignment will be official on January 1, 2021, with 13 districts.

== Camps ==
Boxwell Reservation is a summer camp owned and operated by the Middle Tennessee Council. The camp is located outside Lebanon, Tennessee, on the shores of Old Hickory Lake. and is home to Camp Craig, Camp Stahlman, Camp Parnell, Cubworld, Camp Light and Explorer Island.

Latimer Reservation is a high adventure oriented camp that provides programs of Climbing/Rappelling, Shooting Sports, Mountain Biking, Kayak/Paddle Board, Whitewater Rafting and Backpacking for first time explorers, aspiring enthusiasts, and serious experts.

Grimes Canoe Base is a primitive style Scout camp ideal for 1 to 2 night camping trips located near Linden, Tennessee, on the Buffalo River.

Charles E. Parish Reservation Located in Rock Island, is available for Packs, Troops and Crews to use for weekend camping, camporees, fun days, overnighters, and other events.

== Wa-Hi-Nasa Order of the Arrow Lodge ==
Wa-Hi-Nasa
- Totem: Bald Eagle
- Location: Section E3
- Founded: 1938
- Lodge Chief: Emerson Eige
- Lodge Adviser: Brad Goodwin
- Staff Adviser: Nick Trogdon
- Website www.wa-hi-nasa.org

Wa-Hi-Nasa Lodge #111 is the Order of the Arrow lodge that serves the Middle Tennessee Council. Its headquarters are located in Nashville, TN. The Order of the Arrow is an organization that is dedicated to cheerful service and brotherhood, and is the honor society of the Boy Scouts of America.

The lodge hosts a number of events per year that center around fellowship and service. These include: Spring Summit, Summer Camp Cracker Barrels, June and August Induction Weekends, Fall Fellowship and Winter Banquet. In addition the lodge hosts the Councils Winter Camps at Boxwell and Latimer. At Old Camp Boxwell at the Narrows of the Harpeth, on May 21, 1938, Gene Broyles and a ceremony team from Cherokee Lodge 50 performed the first ordeal ceremony for our fledgling Lodge. With their assistance, eight scouts successfully completed the ceremony: Roy Shaub, Hilary Osborn, O. E. Brandon Jr., Lynn Farrar, Forest Glascow, James Gribble, W. J. Anderson, and Tillman Newsum. This original Ordeal ceremony was made possible due to the help of Dr. Peterson of Franklin. The charter members chose the name “Wa-Hi-Nasa“, which translated from the Cherokee tongue means “Eagle Lodge”or according to the original charter Lair of Eagles. An Eagle with outspread wings was chosen as the lodge totem. During the summer of 1938, Roy Shaub was elected as the lodge's first Chief.

The Wa-Hi-Nasa Lodge has had several National Officers throughout the years, including 1987 Southeastern Region Chief Todd Trapnell, 1992 Southern Region Chief Michael Salazar, 1997 National Vice Chief Josh Sain, 2002 National Chief Clay Capp, 2013 National Chief Matt Brown, 2016 National Chief Hunter Jones and 2019 Southern Region Chief Sid Salazar; as well as several adult members serving on the National Committee and National Sub-Committees.

Order of the Arrow Distinguished Service Award recipients from the Wa-Hi-Nasa Lodge include Ray T. Capp, William F. Ketron, Howard B. Olson, Todd F. Trapnell, David W. Garrett, J Todd Metcalf, Michael A. Salazar, Craig B. Salazar, James A. Schwab, Carl E. Head II, Clay Capp, Benjamin W. Janke, Ian M. Romaine, Ronnie D. Turpin, Matthew E. Brown, Rob Anstett, Hunter Jones, Don Miller, Bobby Robinson and Sidney J. Salazar.

== See also ==
- Scouting in Tennessee
