= Buckeye Council =

Local council of the Boy Scouts of America

- Owner: Boy Scouts of America
- Headquarters: 2301 13th Street NW Canton, OH 44708
- Location: Ohio
- Country: United States
- Coordinates: 40°48′42.7″N 81°23′55.7″W
- President: Gene Thorn
- Council Commissioner: John Fehrenbach
- Scout Executive: Jesse Roper II
- Website http://buckeyecouncil.org

The Buckeye Council is a local council of the Boy Scouts of America that serves eastern Ohio and parts of northern West Virginia. Headquartered in Canton, Ohio, Buckeye Council serves more than 10,000 scouts and has more than 4,000 campers participate in its successful summer camp programs.

== Organization ==
The council headquarters is in Canton, Ohio and is administered through seven districts:

- Hetuck District serves Stark County, Ohio
- Tuskegee District serves inner-city Canton
- Killbuck District serves Holmes County, Ohio and Wayne County, Ohio
- Sandy Beaver District serves Columbiana County, Ohio, Chester, West Virginia and Newell, West Virginia.
- Netawotwes District serves Tuscarawas County, Ohio and Carroll County, Ohio
- Johnny Appleseed Trail District serves Ashland County, Ohio and Richland County, Ohio Counties, Ohio
- Harding Area District serves Wyandot County, Ohio, Crawford County, Ohio, Marion County, Ohio and Morrow County, Ohio Counties, Ohio

== History ==
History

Canton Council #436 founded 1918	Wayne County #465 founded 1919	Massillon Council #462 founded 462	Tuscarawas Council founded 1920
Massillon and Tuscarawas Counties Council #462 merged 1922	Salem Council #455 founded 1922
Central Stark County #436 renamed 1923	Alliance Council #434 founded 1923	Tuscarawas and Western Stark Area Council #462 renamed 1923	North Columbiana County #455 renamed 1923
Western Stark and Northern Tuscarawas Counties Council #462 renamed 1925	Columbiana County Council #455 renamed 1926
Canton Area Council #436 renamed 1927	Tuscarawas and Western Stark Area Council #462 renamed 1926
Canton Area Council #436 merged 1928	Fort Laurens Area Council #462 renamed 1929
Canton Area Council #436 merged 1930	Massillon #462 renamed 1930
McKinley Area Council #436 renamed 1932	Buckeye Area Council #462 renamed 1953	Columbiana Council #455 renamed 1953
Buckeye Council #436 merged 1958
Buckeye Council #436 merged 1991

== Camps ==
Buckeye Council operates three council camps - Seven Ranges Scout Reservation, Camp McKinley, and Camp Rodman. When the Buckeye Area Council merged with McKinley Area Council in 1958, Camp Buckeye and Tuscazoar were operated by the Buckeye Council until 1978 when Camp Buckeye was closed and subsequently sold in 1984. When Camp Tuscazoar was outgrown, the camp was closed and sold in 1986 and Seven Ranges Scout Reservation was opened in 1987.

=== Seven Ranges Scout Reservation ===
Seven Ranges Scout Reservation
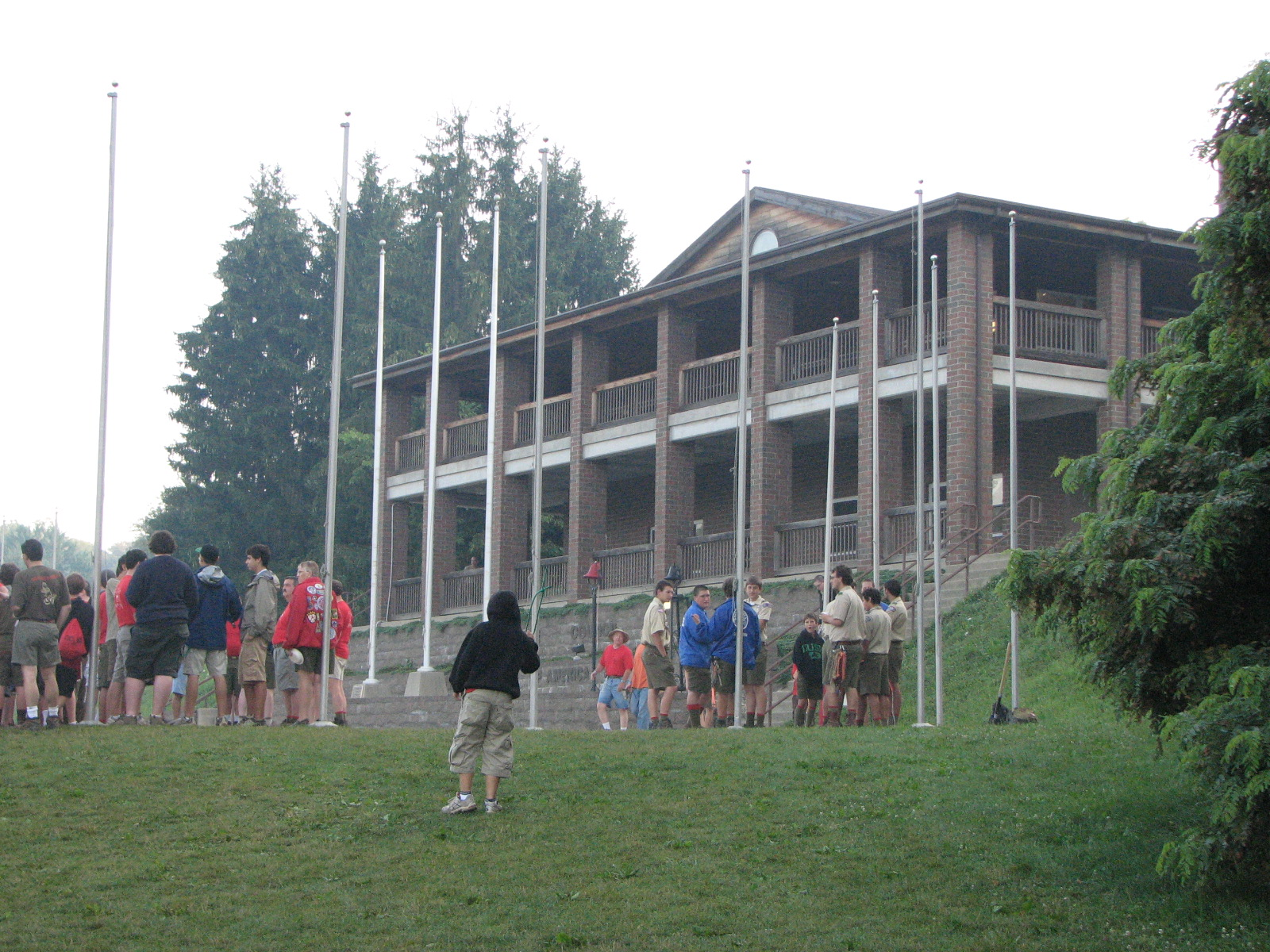
- Frank G. Hoover dining hall and parade grounds before flag raising
- Location: Kensington, Ohio
- Founded: 1987

Seven Ranges Scout Reservation is almost 1,000 acres near Kensington, Ohio known for its Pipestone Camp Honor Program. The Reservation is composed of Camp Algonkin, Camp Calumet, and Camp Akela. Camp Algonkin features 24 campsites, the I. W. Delp Ecology Center, a waterfront area on Lake Don Brown with swimming and boating (Canoeing, Kayaking, Row-boating), a handicraft center, a field sports area (Includes Tomahawk throwing, archery, rifle shooting, and shotgun shooting), and an outdoor skills area. Other special locations in Camp Algonkin are Thunderbird Hill (The highest point in Carroll County), Bridge Builder's Amphitheater which features the Seven Ranges Radio Station, an outdoor, lakeside chapel, a large Order of the Arrow Ceremonies Ring, and the Frank G. Hoover Dining Hall which can accommodate 1,200 scouts at one time for a meal.

Camp Akela is Seven Ranges Cub Scout Area. This features a small amphitheater, a fishing pond, and the COPE course for the entire camp. Summer programs at Camp Akela feature a 4 day-3 night Cub resident camp experience with BB guns, Archery, nature lore, crafts, fishing and the H.A.W.K. (Honor Akela With Knowledge) award.

Camp Calumet is an outpost camp across Lake Don Brown. Troops can choose to outpost camp as part of their summer camp experience - using the patrol cooking method to prepare their own meals in their site, yet still participate in the many advancement and program opportunities in the Seven Ranges summer camp.

The Pipestone Camp Honor Program was founded in Camp Tuscazoar, Zoar, Ohio in the summer of 1925 by George M. Deaver, Scout Executive of the Council; C. L. Riley, a teacher at Canton McKinley High School, who was serving as Camp Director at the time; I. W. Delp, Principal of Lehman High School in Canton; and Charles E. Mills, a Scouter who was skilled in theatrical production. The program sought to reward Scouts who excelled in advancement and Scouting spirit while at the camp. The Native Americans of the Tuscarawas valley inspired the ceremonies of the program. The success of the program led its founders to set it as a five-year series to encourage scouts to return the following summer, and after a scout achieved their 5th year award, that scout would have sufficient time (before turning 18) and a majority of merit badges needed to earn the rank of Eagle Scout. In 2025, the Pipestone Camp Honor Program celebrated its "100 Years Of Honor" program event.

In order to earn pipestone, a Scout must complete the Swimming Requirement, a Good Turn Service Project for the Camp, have Camp Spirit, complete at least one merit badge or advance in rank at camp, complete the ecology requirement (1st-3rd year only), Earn Leadership Points (4th and 5th year only), Complete a Leadership Project (4th and 5th only), and submit (upon arrival on Sunday) One bundle of a cubic foot of barkless, straight, hardwood (no pine) firmly bound with twine. (1st–4th year only).

=== Camp McKinley ===
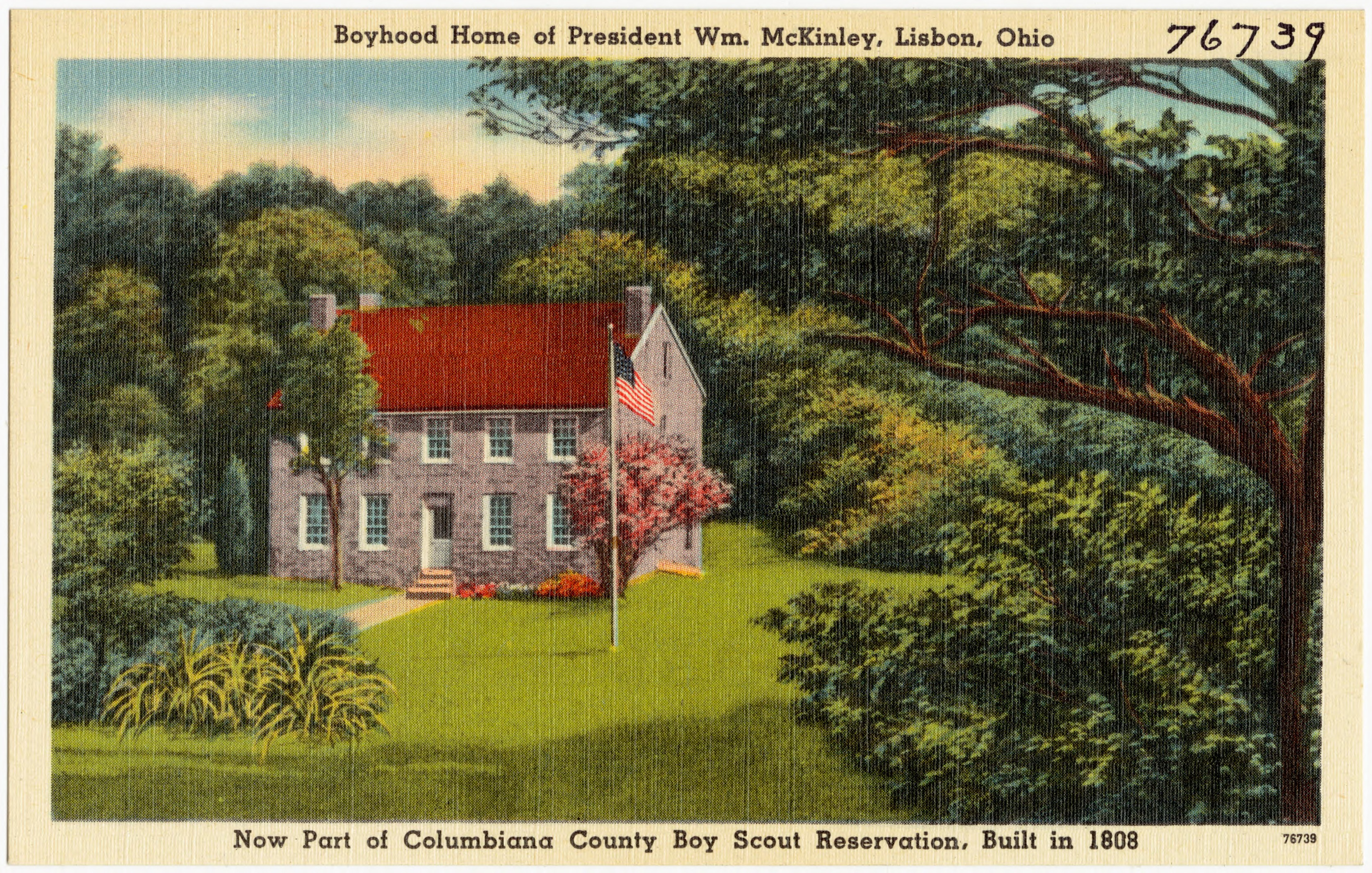
Boyhood home of McKinley, on the camp grounds.

Camp McKinley has been owned and operated by various Councils with the Boy Scouts of America since 1934. The camp is located in Columbiana County, just outside the city of Lisbon, Ohio. Camp McKinley currently occupies approximately 196 acres (0.8 km^{2}) and is operated by the Buckeye Council as an off season camp.

From 1972 to 1991, the Columbiana Council operated Camp McKinley as its full-time summer camp. Columbiana council previously used Camp Twin Spruce as its summer camp until it sold the lease in 1971. The Stone Mansion, known as the McKinley Homestead, became the home of the camp ranger, and is located at the entrance of camp. In 1991, with the merger of Columbiana and Buckeye Council, Camp McKinley was closed as a Boy Scout summer camp in favor of newly built Seven Ranges Scout Reservation. In 1997 Buckeye Council began operating the Scaroyadii Trail (named for the Order of the Arrow Lodge of the dissolved Columbiana Council). This 18-mile (29 km) trail between Seven Ranges and McKinley follows portions of U.S. Route 30 and the abandoned Sandy Beaver Canal.

=== Camp Rodman ===
Camp Rodman is a small primitive camp on the outskirts of Alliance Ohio owned by the Rodman Foundation but operated and maintained by the Buckeye Council.

== Order of the Arrow ==
Sipp-O Lodge #377 is the Order of the Arrow Lodge that supports the council.
