= Scouting in South Carolina =

Scouting in South Carolina has a long history, from the 1910s to the present day, serving thousands of youth in programs that suit the environment in which they live.

== Sc0uting America ==
There are six Scouting America local councils in South Carolina.

=== Blue Ridge Council ===
- Headquarters located in Greenville, SC
- Camp Old Indian
- Home of Atta Kulla Kulla Lodge 185
- Lakeland District
- Swamp Rabbit District
- Three Rivers District

=== Coastal Carolina Council ===
- Home of Unali'Yi Lodge 236
- Black River District
- Etiwan District
- Palmetto District (merger of Kiawah and Lowcountry District)
- Pineland District
- Swamp Fox District
- Twin Rivers District

=== Georgia Carolina Council ===
Council office located in Augusta, Georgia, includes districts in South Carolina and Georgia.

=== Indian Waters Council ===
The Indian Waters Council merged with the former Pee Dee Area Council of Northeast SC, forming the current Indian Waters Council. Scouting programs include Bamberg, Calhoun, Chesterfield, Clarendon, Darlington, Dillon, Fairfield, Florence, Horry, Kershaw, Lee, Lexington, Marion, Marlboro, Orangeburg, Richland, Saluda, Sumter, and Williamsburg Counties in South Carolina.

The Indian Waters Council programs include:

- Atakwa
- Capital Rivers
- Chicora
- Chinquapin
- Edisto
- Etowah
- Sandhills(formerly Wateree and Henry Shelor)
- ScoutReach
- Muscogee Lodge 116, Order of the Arrow

=== Palmetto Council ===
Headquarters located in Spartanburg, South Carolina.

- Daniel Morgan District – Spartanburg, Union and Cherokee Counties.
- York District – All of York, Chester and Lancaster Counties.*
- Camps located at the Glendale Outdoor Leadership School in Glendale, SC, and Camp Conley Clarke, located in Cherokee County, SC.
- Home of Skyuka Lodge 270

== Girl Scouting in South Carolina ==
Map of Girl Scout Councils in South Carolina

There are four Girl Scout councils in South Carolina.

=== Girl Scouts of South Carolina – Mountains to Midlands ===
This council was formed on May 1, 2007, from the merger of Girl Scout Council of the Congaree Area, Girl Scouts of the Old 96 Council, and Girl Scouts of the Piedmont Area Council, and serves 15,000 girls and adult volunteers in 22 counties Its headquarters are located in Greenville, SC.

Camps:

- Camp Mary Elizabeth – an Urban camp, 56 acres (230,000 m^{2}) within the city of Spartanburg, SC.
- Camp WaBak – Marietta, South Carolina – 135 acres (0.5 km^{2}) in the mountains
- Camp Wistagoman – Anderson, SC – 25 acres (100,000 m^{2})
- Camp Ponderosa – 40 acres (160,000 m^{2}) in Pauline, South Carolina.

=== Girl Scouts of Eastern South Carolina ===
Girl Scouts of Eastern South Carolina (GSESC) began operations in January 2007 following the merger of Girl Scout Council of the Pee Dee Area, Inc. and Girl Scouts of Carolina Low Country. The council serves over 15,000 girls and 3,000 adults in Allendale, Bamberg, Barnwell, Beaufort, Berkeley, Calhoun, Charleston, Chesterfield, Clarendon, Colleton, Darlington, Dillon, Dorchester, Florence, Georgetown, Horry, Lee, Marion, Marlboro, Orangeburg and Williamsburg counties.. Its service centers are located in Florence, South Carolina and North Charleston, South Carolina. Its headquarters are also in North Charleston, SC.

Camps:

- Sandy Ridge – Bennettsville, SC – 400 acres (1,600,000 m^{2})

=== Girl Scouts of Historic Georgia ===
This council serves more than 13,000 girls and 5,000 adults in Georgia, Alabama, and South Carolina. Its headquarters are in Lizella, Georgia. In South Carolina, it serves the counties of Hampton and Jasper. It does not have any camps in South Carolina.

See also: Scouting in Georgia.

=== Girl Scouts, Hornet's Nest Council ===
The Girl Scouts, Hornets' Nest Council is headquartered in Charlotte, North Carolina. It was chartered in 1935. It serves 8,000 girls and volunteers in North Carolina and South Carolina. In South Carolina, it serves the county of York. It has one camp in Statesville, NC. It does not have any camps in South Carolina.

See also: Scouting in North Carolina.
