= Three Fires Council =

Scouting America council

- Owner: Scouting America
- Country: United States
- Website www.threefirescouncil.org

The Three Fires Council of Scouting America is located in Illinois.

== History ==
In 1992, Three Fires Council was formed from the merger of Two Rivers Council and DuPage Area Council (named for DuPage County); it was briefly called "Two Rivers-DuPage Area Council." Three Fires operates Camp Big Timber near Elgin, Illinois and Scout Shops in St. Charles, Illinois and Naperville, Illinois. The council is divided into 3 districts based on location.

== Organization ==
- Chippewa District 1
- Ottawa District 2
- Potawatomi District 3

== Camp Freeland Leslie ==
Camp Freeland Leslie
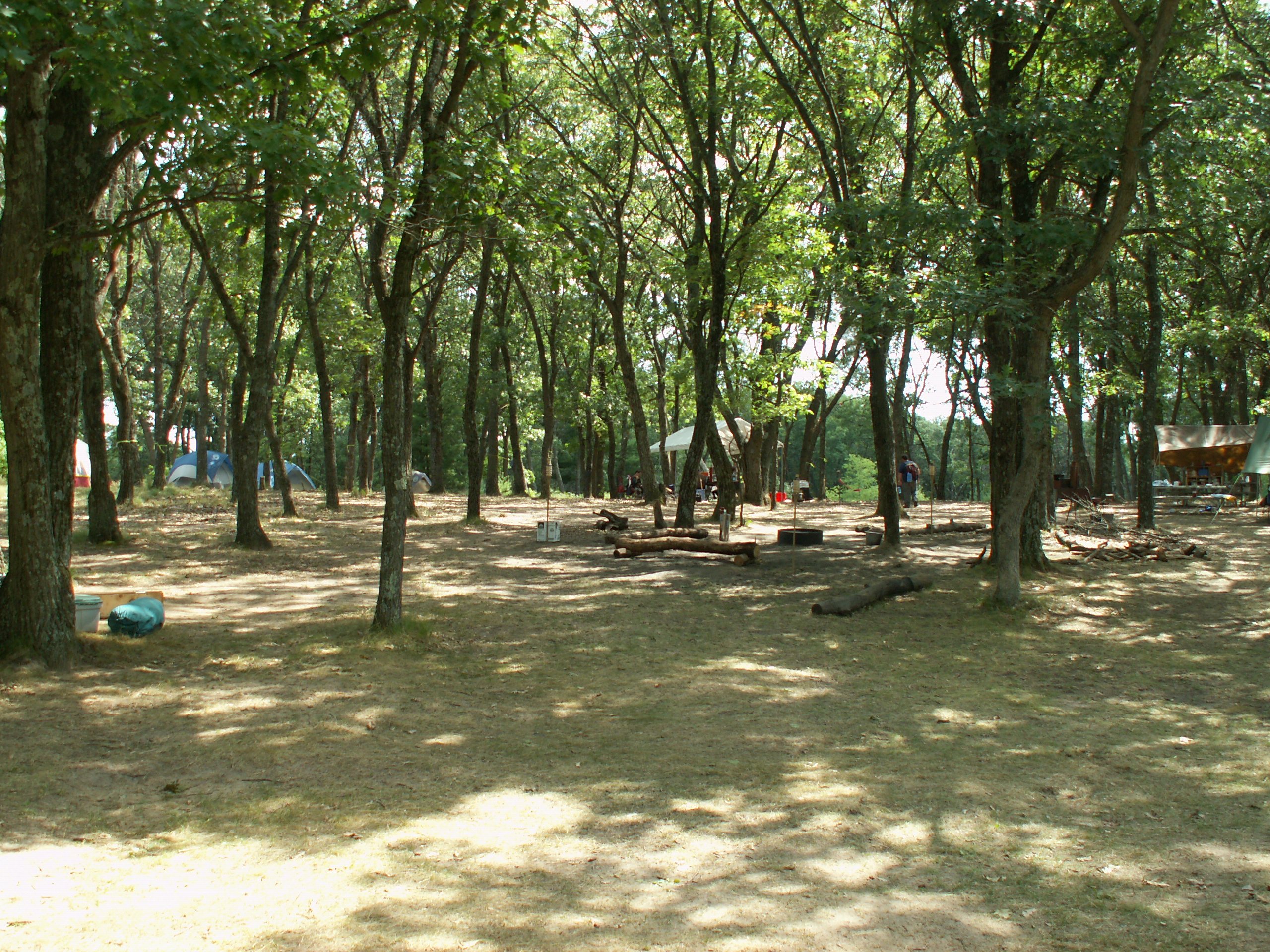
- Chickamauga Campsite at Camp Freeland Leslie
- Location: Oxford, Wisconsin
- Coordinates: 43.8103°N 89.5992°W
- Founded: 1972
- Defunct: 2021
- Website www.threefirescouncil.org.com

Camp Freeland Leslie (CFL) operated near Oxford, Wisconsin, from 1972 to 2021. It was located approximately 25 miles northeast of the Wisconsin Dells. The camp offered over 500 acres of natural settings: oak forests, prairies, swamp, streams, abundant wildlife and a lake entirely on the property. The camp was purchased by the former DuPage Area Council in 1970. Camp Freeland Leslie was first used as a summer camp in 1972. Camp Freeland Leslie was a patrol cooking camp, and did not operate a dining hall.

In March of 2021, the Three Fires Council announced that Camp Freeland Leslie would be sold and that the 2021 summer would be the last summer camp season. The camp was sold in part due to the Boy Scouts of America's bankruptcy filing and the necessity for the council to contribute to the sex abuse victim's trust fund.

== Lowaneu Allanque Lodge ==
Lowaneu Allanque Lodge is the Order of the Arrow Lodge affiliated with Three Fires Council. In the past, the Spring Fellowship was held at CFL, as well as Ordeal and Brotherhood ceremonies during summer camp. Many Three Fires Council Order of the Arrow events took place at Camp Freeland Leslie.

== See also ==
- Scouting in Illinois
