= Coronado Area Council =

Scouting America local council

- Owner: Scouting America
- Headquarters: Salina, Kansas
- Location: Kansas
- Country: United States
- Scout Executive: Kyle Smith
- Website www.coronadoscout.org

The Coronado Area Council is a 501(c)(3) and local council of the Scouting America, that serves Scouts and Scouting volunteers in north central and northwest Kansas, across 32 counties, with headquarters in Salina.

On October 28, 2026, Quivira Council announced that Coronado Area Council would merge into Quivira Council.

== Organization ==
Triconda district Konza district Wheatland district Tomahawk district Buffalo Bill district Red star is headquarters in Salina, Kansas

The council headquarters is located in Salina, Kansas and the council is organized into five districts.

- Triconda District, encompassing Saline, Ellsworth, Lincoln, Ottawa, Cloud, Mitchell, and Republic counties and the city of Abilene in Dickinson county.
- Konza District: Dickinson, Geary, Morris, Clay, Washington and Riley counties
- Wheatland District: Russell, Ellis, Trego, Osborne, Rooks and Gove counties
- Tomahawk District: Graham, Norton, Decatur, Sheridan, Phillips, Smith and Jewell counties
- Buffalo Bill District: Sherman, Cheyenne, Wallace, Thomas, Rawlins, and Logan counties

== Dane G. Hansen Scout Reservation ==
Dane G. Hansen Scout Reservation
- The location of the Dane G. Hansen Scout Reservation within the state of Kansas and Phillips County.
- Location: 2 miles SSW Kirwin, Kansas
- Coordinates: 39°38′23″N 99°08′32″W
- Founded: 1965
- Founder: Dane G. Hansen
- Ranger: Clayton Franks
- Camp Director: Jared Benton

Dane G. Hansen Scout Reservation, often called Camp Hansen, is the Coronado Area Council's summer Scout camp, located two miles south-southwest of Kirwin, Kansas. The coordinates are 39°38′23″N 99°08′32″W, and it is a part of the Kirwin National Wildlife Refuge.

=== Tribe of the Golden Eagle ===
The Coronado Area Council operates a leadership program, the Tribe of Golden the Eagle at Camp Hansen. The program was inspired by the Pony Express Council and Heart of America Council's Tribe of Mic-O-Say. Membership is indicated by the wearing of replica eagle claws, with the number of claws and the paint on the tips of the claws indicating rank within the tribe.

== Kidi Kidsh Lodge ==
The Kidi Kidsh Lodge is the Coronado Area Council lodge in the Order of the Arrow, the national Boy Scout honor society.

== See also ==
- Scouting in Kansas
