= Prairielands Council =

Council of the Boy Scouts of America

Prairielands Council 117
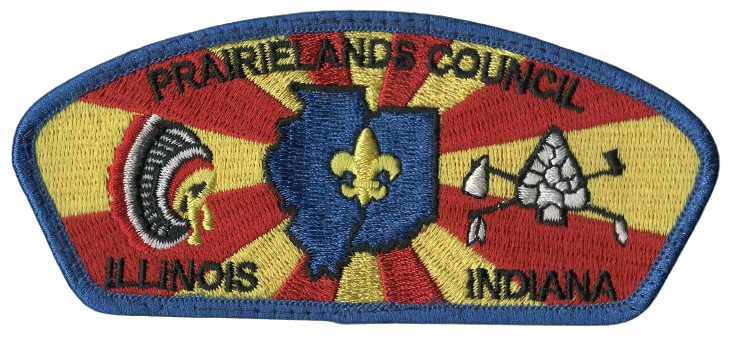
- Owner: Scouting America
- Headquarters: Champaign, Illinois
- Location: Central Illinois and Western Indiana
- Country: United States
- Founded: 1991 (35 years old)
- Scout Executive: Jared White
- Website http://www.prairielandsbsa.org

Prairielands Council 117 (formerly named Illiana Council 117) is a local council of Scouting America that was former in 1991 by the merger of Arrowhead Council 117 and Piankeshaw Council 739. The council serves scouts in east central Illinois and western Indiana. The headquarters of the council is located in Champaign, Illinois.

== History ==
At the time the Champaign-Urbana Council was formed in 1919, the Council used a small facility at Weldon Springs called Camp Hatetokwitit, for a majority of its Scout camping. A tract of land outside Oakwood was acquired for the new council camp with financial assistance from the Rotary Club. The camp was founded in 1932 and is named for Robert J. Drake, Champaign-Urbana Council's Scout executive, who oversaw the purchase of the property but died of scarlet fever in 1929 before the camp was opened. Robert Drake is buried with his parents outside of Chicago, Illinois

The camp opened for the inaugural camping season on June 13, 1932. Camp Drake is one of the oldest council-owned and operated Scout camps in the nation. The camp celebrated its 90th continuous year of operation in 2022.

== Organization ==
The council is divided into two districts:

- Many Trails District
- Prairie Fire District

== Camps ==
Camp Robert Drake
- Location: Oakwood, Illinois
- Founded: 1932
- Website http://campdrake.com

Prairielands Council currently owns and operates Camp Robert Drake, a Boy Scout camp facility located near Oakwood, Illinois (although the property is addressed in Fairmount, Illinois and it is in the school district of Catlin, Illinois). The facility is used primarily during the summer as a resident camp for Boy Scout and Cub Scout units, and a half-week Venturing camp.

The camp facility is in use year-round by Scout units of all types, and is available for rental by other non-profit groups.

The programs at Camp Robert Drake are annually accredited by the National Camping School of the Boy Scouts of America. The camp runs four weeks of camp aimed for Boy Scouts, two half-week camps designed for Cub Scouts and Webelos, and one day camp for Cub Scouts.

== Order of the Arrow ==
Illini Lodge 55
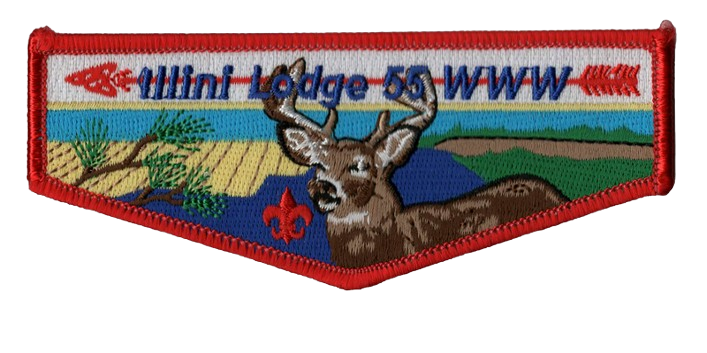
- Totem: White-tailed deer
- Founded: 1994
- Lodge Chief: Charlie Martin
- Vice Chief of Administration: Alex Deschler
- Vice Chief of Activities: Austin Barger
- Vice Chief of Inductions: Eli Denmark-Collins
- Lodge Secretary: Nathan McElhaney
- Website http://illinilodge55.com

Illini Lodge 55, formed by the merger of Waukheon Lodge 55 (Piankeshaw Council) and Illini Lodge 92 (Arrowhead Council) in 1994, is the council's Order of the Arrow lodge.

== See also ==
- Scouting in Illinois
