= Central Georgia Council =

Local council of Scouting America

- Owner: Scouting America
- Headquarters: Macon, GA.
- Location: 4335 Confederate Way, Macon, Georgia 31217
- Country: United States
- Coordinates: 32.8037°N 83.5735°W
- Founded: 1921; 105 years ago
- Website http://www.centralgeorgiacouncil.org

The Central Georgia Council is a local council of the Scouting America, serving 24 counties in central Georgia.

== Organization ==
The council is divided into three districts:

- Robert L. Scott District
- Ocmulgee District
- Oconee District

== Camps ==
=== Camp Benjamin Hawkins ===
Camp Benjamin Hawkins is a 550-acre (2.2 km^{2}) Scouting preserve situated near Byron, Georgia. The camp has been in operation since 1927 and has a long history of Scouting traditions. It boasts a solid BSA program which includes: a First Year Camper program (Buckskins), merit badges, C.O.P.E.(Challenging Outdoor Personal Experience), BSA Lifeguard, and various other activities. The camp has witnessed a boom in capital improvements over recent years, including a pedestrian bridge, new camping facilities, and an expanded dining hall. In July 2024, it was announced that, due to financial pressures, the camp was under contract to be sold.

== Order of the Arrow ==
The Echeconnee Lodge #358 was chartered in 1947. The Echeconnee Creek is a prominent land feature near the Council's Camp Benjamin Hawkins. Echeconnee is Creek for "Deer Trap Creek".

Arrowmen chose the Deer as their official totem of the lodge. Early patches of the lodge had a deer prominently displayed on them. In 1952, the O.A. national committee asked the BSA to approve a lodge emblem which would fit the right pocket flap of the uniform. Lodge members based the design of their lodge flap on the Creek people who lived in the area until they were forced to leave in the 1800s due to the encroachment of White settlers on their homeland. The border is based on a pottery design used by the Creek Nation, and the mounds in the background are based on those found in the Ocmulgee National Monument in Macon, Georgia.

=== Echeconnee Lodge Chapters ===
The Echeconnee Lodge has three chapters:

- Ocmulgee
- Oconee
- Robert L. Scott

== See also ==
- Scouting in Georgia (U.S. state)
