= Northwest Georgia Council =

Local council of the Boy Scouts of America

Northwest Georgia Council (#100)
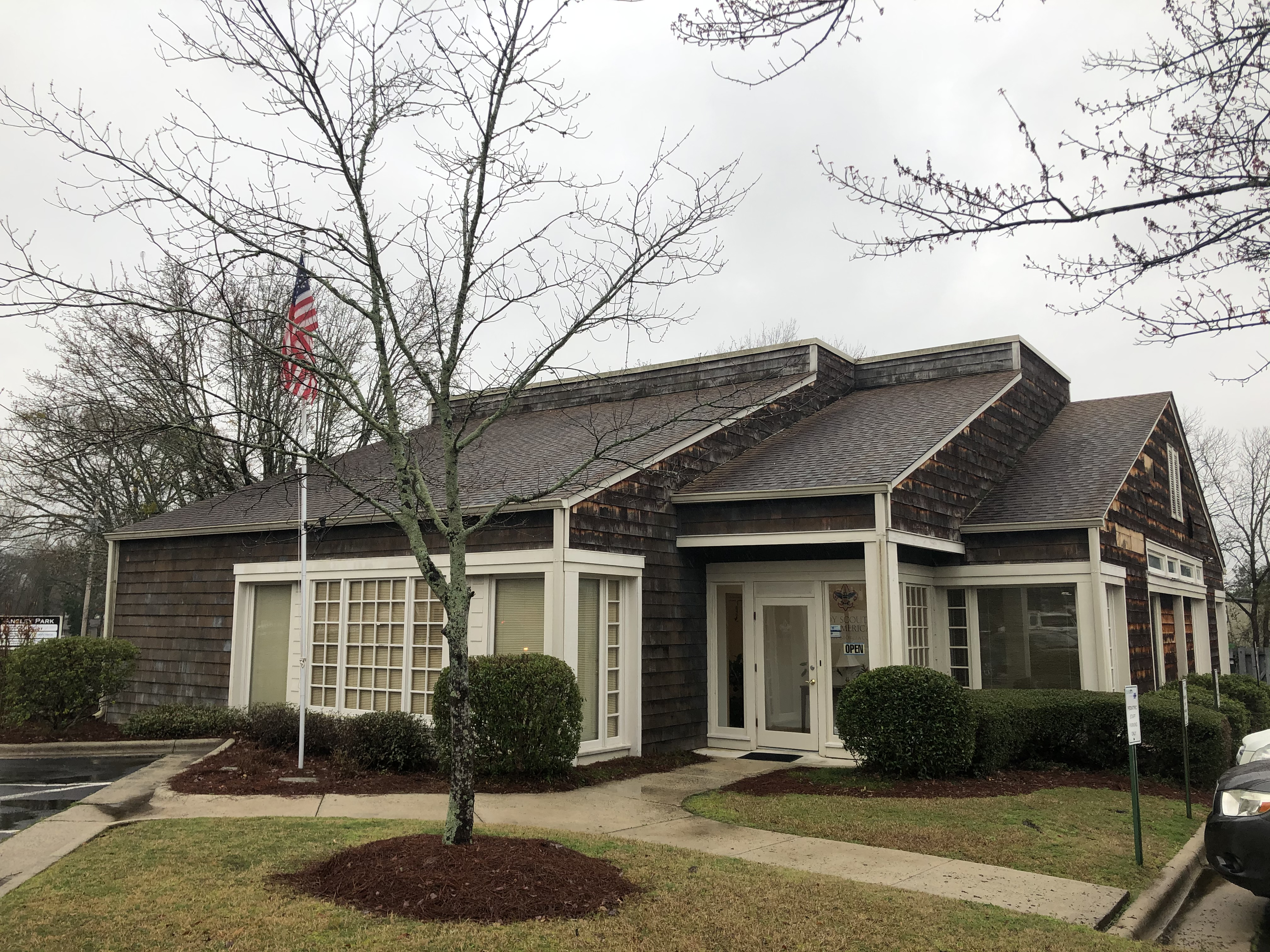
- BSA Northwest Georgia Council Headquarters
- Owner: Boy Scouts of America
- Headquarters: Rome, Georgia
- Country: United States
- Website www.nwgascouting.org

The Northwest Georgia Council is a local council of the Boy Scouts of America which currently encompasses Bartow, Chattooga, Floyd, Gordon, Murray, Polk, and Whitfield counties. In the early 1980s, affiliations with Catoosa and Murray counties were transferred to the Cherokee Area Council of Chattanooga, Tennessee, but associations with Murray county were later returned to the Northwest Georgia Council in 1995. The first troop chartered by the Northwest Georgia Council was Troop 12 of Dalton, Georgia, which was established by Mr. W. M. Sapp on March 14, 1911. The council's oldest continually chartered troop, Troop 12 of Adairsville, Georgia, was chartered soon after in 1915. The headquarters of the Northwest Georgia Council are located in Rome, Georgia. The current Scout Executive for the Northwest Georgia Council is Rob Stone.

== Organization ==
The council is divided into two districts, the Etowah District and Three Rivers Service Areas

== Camps ==
=== Camp Westin ===
Camp Westin is a short-term primitive camping facility of 55 acres located on Lake Allatoona in Bartow County.

=== Camp Sidney Dew ===
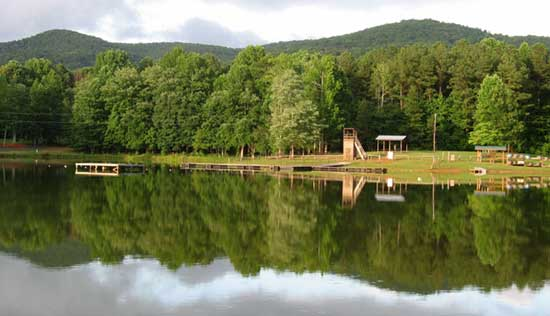
Lake Goodyear hosts part of the Aquatics Merit Badge Area during the Summer Camp Program.

Camp Sidney Dew is over 650 acres (2.6 km^{2}), was founded in 1939 and is located in a valley between John's Mountain and Horn Mountain with the Chattahoochee National Forest to the North and John's Creek to the South.

==== Facilities ====
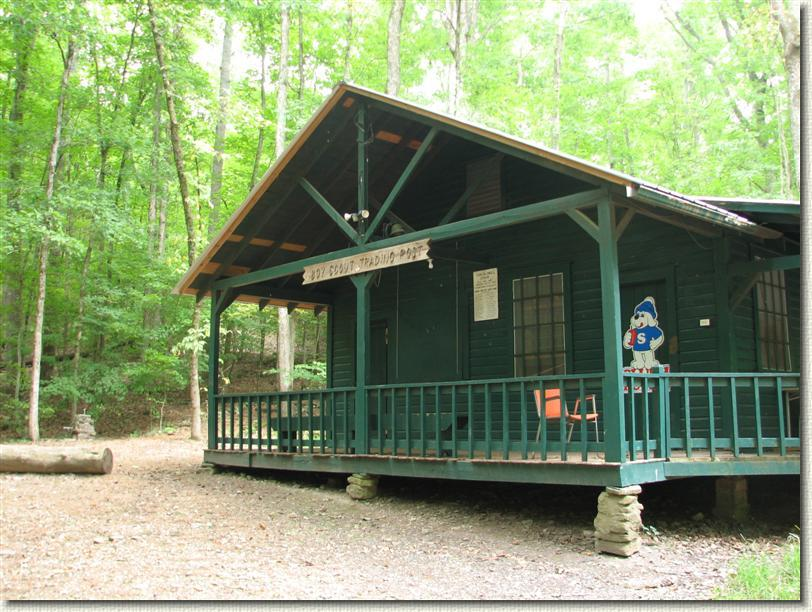
The Trading Post a.k.a. the Tom Caldwell Cabin

The Trading Post serves as the camp store, and is also known as the Tom Caldwell Cabin because it was the home to the first Ranger, Tom Caldwell. The Dining Hall seats up to 300 people. Named after Devine Hubbs, a long time Scoutmaster from Dalton, GA, the Hubbs Reception Center is the first building that people see when they pass through the gate into camp; it serves as the headquarters of the Camp Director and Program Director during summer camp and is where troops check in to start their week at summer camp. The Reception Center also serves as one of the main training facilities during year-round camp.

The Council Ring hosts the start and finish of the weekly camp program during summer camp, with a campfire. It was originally constructed in 1946 as part of an OA Ordeal.It was extended in 2007 to prepare for the 2008 SR-6S Conclave that took place at Camp Sidney Dew. A bridge leads over a creek to the Council Ring. At the end of the bridge is a small replica of the Statue of Liberty. Called the "Little Sister of Liberty", it was placed in 1951 as part of a campaign started in 1949 to place small versions of the Statue of Liberty across America.

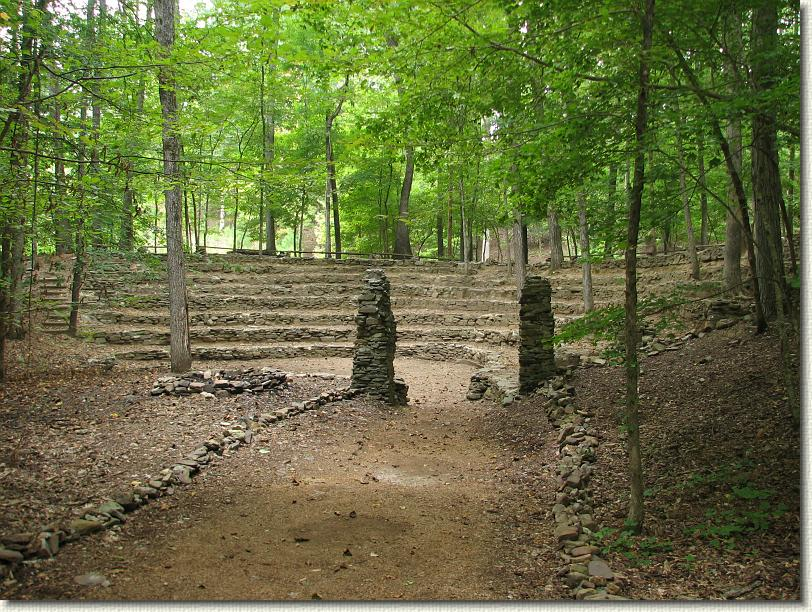
The Council Ring

The Handicraft/Order of the Arrow Lodge are two buildings in one. One half of the building serves as a handicraft area during summer camp program and the other half is the Waguli Lodge 318 headquarters. Originally the first camp mess hall, The Handicraft/OA Lodge is one of the oldest buildings on camp.

The Aquatics Building is the host to a commercial pool, used during the summer camp program and available for year-round use for a small fee.

== Order of the Arrow ==
Waguli Lodge is the Order of the Arrow lodge.

== See also ==
Scouting in Georgia (U.S. state)
