= Great Smoky Mountain Council =

Local council of Scouting America

Great Smoky Mountain Council (#557)
- Owner: Scouting America
- Headquarters: Knoxville, Tennessee
- Country: United States
- Founded: 1911
- Website http://www.eastTNscouts.org/

The Great Smoky Mountain Council is a local council of the Scouting America in Tennessee, with headquarters in Knoxville. It serves 21 East Tennessee counties that span two time zones. Camp Buck Toms is a summer camp owned and operated by the Great Smoky Mountain Council. The camp is located outside Rockwood, Tennessee, on the shores of Watts Bar Lake.

== History ==
The Great Smoky Mountain Council was founded as the Knoxville Council in August 1911. Upon official incorporation of the Knoxville Council, Dr. Charles H. Gordon, associate state geologist of the University of Tennessee, was elected its president. R.E. Mooney was treasurer, Miss Leah Fletcher, principal of the Rose Avenue school, was the secretary, and Prof. W.J. Barton, principal of Knoxville High School, was named the Scout Commissioner. The executive committee of the council was completed by; E.W. Ogden, Frank West, Frederick Bonham, Dr. A.S. Keim, and Rev. B.A. Williams.

By October 1911, six troops had been organized in various sections of the city comprising a total of about 100 scouts. Scoutmaster Solon Kipp organized a troop in the Mountain View school and community, as well as Troop No. 5 in Park City. A.R. Wilson was scoutmaster of Troop No. 1 in South Knoxville; Duncan White was scoutmaster of Troop No. 2 in East Knoxville; R.W. Tapp was scoutmaster of Troop No. 3 (probably at the YMCA) in the uptown district; W.T. Scott was scoutmaster of Troop No. 4 in North Knoxville; and Herbert Henegar was scoutmaster of Troop No. 6 in West Knoxville. By the end of November, Herbert Henegar could no longer continue as scoutmaster for his district, and Hugh F. VanDevented was appointed scoutmaster over West Knoxville.

An article in The Journal and Tribune reported on January 29, 1915, that the council was finally reorganized as the Knox County Council with a service area that officially covered all of Knox County. This new council was re-chartered under the leadership of:

- David T. Blakely, president;
- P.C. Mathis, secretary;
- Dr. Charles H. Gordon, vice-president;
- Frederick T. Bonham, treasurer;
- W.C. Armistead, Deputy Scout Commissioner; and
- William P. “Buck” Toms, Scout Commissioner

The 1916 summer camp for the Knox County Council was held at Chilhowee Park and appeared to be very successful. It was named camp Ottosee, after the original name of the lake at the park. An article in the August 28, 1916, edition of The Journal and Tribune reported that the encampment was under the supervision of Commissioner Toms and scouts received instruction in swimming, first-aid, Scoutcraft, and camp hygiene. Troop No. 4 had the most scouts in attendance, and they won the field day competition on the last full day of camp.

In October 1916, a financial campaign was begun to develop funding for the hiring of a Scout Executive and the purchase of a permanent scout camp. The campaign was under the overall supervision of Special National Field Commissioner C.M. Abbott, and upon completion of a successful campaign, the Knox County Council was designated a first class council by BSA Headquarters. A total of over $10,000 was quickly raised and a scout headquarters was established in the Merchant’s National Bank building. In January 1917, Robert John Charles, director of the boys department of the Norfolk, Va. YMCA, was hired as the Scout Executive for the Knox County Council. He appeared to be well qualified and had even served as field scout commissioner while in Tampa, Florida. The Council included approximately 225 officially registered Boy Scouts, 10 scoutmasters, and 15 asst. scoutmasters in 10 troops at the time of his hiring.

In early May 1917, Executive Charles resigned his position with the Knox County Council to take a position with the YMCA in Tampa, Florida. Within a week after the departure of R.J. Charles, John Gore was appointed to the position of scout executive by the council’s executive board. He quickly assumed this new role on June 1, and within a month, he organized Troop Nos. 15, 16, 17, and 18 in the city.

Knoxville scouts living up to their motto to “Be Prepared”, quickly put their training to the test when the steps of the Park City high school collapsed under the weight of over 1300 students (although a Nov. 19, 2016 article in The Journal and Tribune cite 1700 students). Scouting magazine (Vol. 3, Number 21 from Mar. 1, 1916) reported that several scouts from Troop Nos. 2, 4, and 5 were present and provided a quick and correct first-aid response to the injured. Their actions won praise locally from the Park City Schools Superintendent J.R. Lowry, as well as from BSA Headquarters in New York.

By June 1917, Council officials began seriously searching for property on which to establish the Council’s permanent scout camp. A classified add in the June 18, 1917, issue of The Journal and Tribune requested property containing 10-50 acres, on a body of water with good swimming facilities, and within 10-12 miles from Knoxville. Within a few years, the Council would purchase and develop a permanent camp near Powell, Tennessee.

The Cumberland Council was formed in Lenoir City in 1927 and a council of the same name was formed in LaFollette from 1921 to 1923. The Great Depression saw the consolidation of these councils into the Knoxville Area Council. The name was changed in 1943 to its current incarnation.

In 1915, the Knox County Council's first summer camp was held at Camp Helpful, near Elkmont, in what is now the Great Smoky Mountains National Park. Four years later, camp was held at a facility in Powell known as The Scout Ranch.

While Boy Scouting certainly helped to promote character development and citizenship in the lives of millions of mostly white youth in the decades before World War II, its impact in the black community is much less understood and poorly documented by Scouting historians. Scouting was implemented in the black community in and around Knoxville with a focus on the establishment and operation of the black Scouting division in the Knoxville Area Council (later renamed the Great Smoky Mountain Council), beginning in the early 1930s. As was common during this era, black Scouting operations in the Knoxville Area Council in large extent mirrored that of white Scouting. The black Scouting division operated as a separate and distinct arm of Scouting apart from white Scouting in almost every way. The division had its own organizational committee, leader training program, camping program, summer camp, service projects, fundraising, professional liaison, etc. This situation continued for a number of years until the black and white Scouting programs were effectively and permanently merged with the dissolution of the black Scouting division in the council many years later.

The earliest reference to black Boy Scouting in Knoxville is found in, A Social Study of the Colored Population of Knoxville, Tennessee (1926) documenting that there were no formally chartered black Boy Scout troops operating in Knoxville at that time. The Knoxville Journal reported on March 5, 1931, that Jacques A. Beauchamp came to Knoxville to conduct training for scoutmasters and spoke at an assembly at Knoxville’s black Austin High School to promote the organization of black Boy Scout troops and professional work for black executives in the BSA. The Aurora newspaper (published at Knoxville College) also reported on March 5 that three black Boy Scout troops (Troop Nos. 60-62) had recently been established in the city. The article described Scouting for the black community in this way, “We do not see how anyone could register any adverse criticism to it. The training it gives to the boys and young men is wholesome and helpful.” The article mused that current Knoxville College students should take BSA training as a way to promote the formation of black troops in the communities that they would later live in after graduation.

In 1936, the Knoxville Council leased a patch of property on Norris Lake from the Tennessee Valley Authority. This soon became the Council summer camp, named Camp Pellissippi. 1938 saw Camp Pellissippi's first summer camp season; 75 Scouts attended with 600 in attendance the following year. Pellissppi Lodge 230 of the Order of the Arrow is named for the camp.

In 1952 several Scout leaders including William Perry "Buck" Toms purchased a plot of property on the shores of Watts Bar Lake using proceeds from a Scout show. Three years later, the first summer camp was held at Buck Toms with 155 Scouts and leaders in attendance. The first campers arrived by boat, due to the lack of any road to the camp grounds. Electricity was implemented at the camp in 1957.

In 1977, the dining hall at Camp Pellissippi was destroyed by fire. The summer camp was rendered defunct and although the council has retained the property as a campground for troops, it has not served as a summer camp since. This left Camp Buck Toms to serve as the sole summer camp of the Great Smoky Mountain Council. However, Camp Pellissippi continues to host an annual winter camp for Boy Scouts.

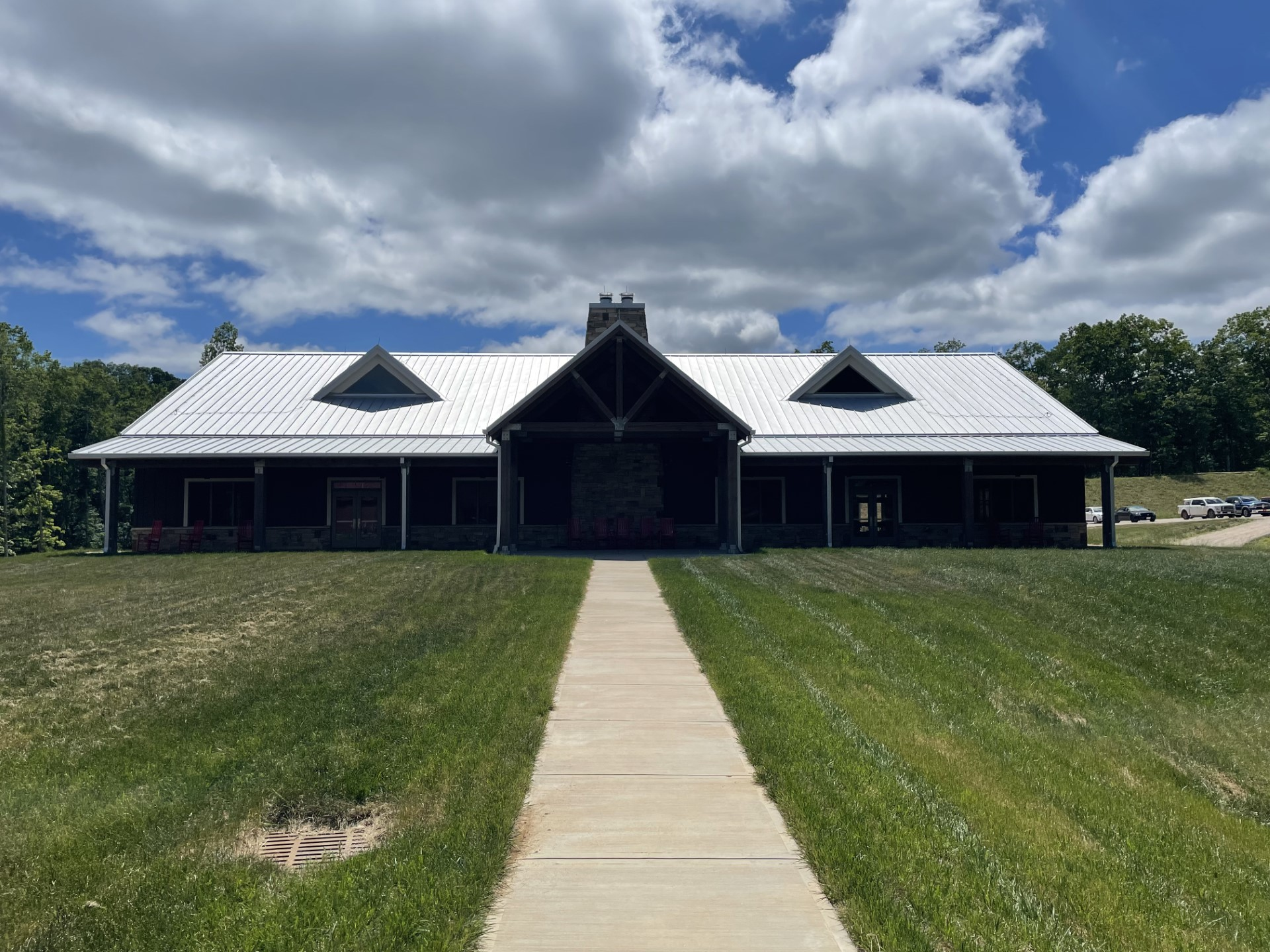
The Pat and Joe Johnson Dining Hall at Camp Buck Toms.

1994 saw the renovation of Buck Toms with the addition of several buildings, including a dining hall that greatly increased the camp's capacity. In 2022, the Council completed construction of a third dining hall on the Camp Buck Toms property.

== Organization ==
As a part of the council’s normal strategic planning cycle, the Great Smoky Mountain Council’s Executive Board appointed a Council Alignment Study Committee in September 2019. The council's Vice President of Strategic Planning, led a committee of 40+ diverse and seasoned volunteers. Key leadership from every district were invited to be a part of this important process. This year-long process culminated at the September 15, 2020, Executive Board meeting and positions the council to provide their programs equitably across the 21 counties we serve in of East Tennessee.

The Council Alignment Study Committee’s unanimous recommendation on how to best provide a quality program to all Scouts throughout the Great Smoky Mountain Council was presented and approved by both the council’s officers and the executive board on September 15, 2020.

Beginning January 1, 2021, the council is divided into 6 districts:

- Cades Cove District, serving Blount, Loudon, Meigs, McMinn, and Monroe Counties
- Cataloochee District, serving southern Knox County, Cocke, Grainger, Hamblen, Jefferson, and Sevier Counties
- Eagle Creek District, serving Cumberland, Fentress, Morgan, Pickett, Roane, and Scott Counties
- Mount Cammerer District, serving of central and northern Knox County, Campbell, Claiborne, and Union Counties
- Mount Le Conte District, serving western Knox County and Anderson County
- Tremont District, serving STEM Scouts in the Knoxville area

== Pellissippi Lodge ==
Pellissippi
- Totem: Silver Fox
- Location: Section E-3
- Founded: 1943
- Website http://www.pellissippilodge.org/

Pellissippi Lodge #230 is the Order of the Arrow lodge that serves the Great Smoky Mountain Council in East Tennessee. Its headquarters are located in Knoxville, TN. The Order of the Arrow is an organization that is dedicated to cheerful service and brotherhood, and is the honor society of the Boy Scouts of America.

The Pellissippi Lodge has a rich history that includes many notable individuals, including former National Chief Jeff Moser. Moser served as the National Chief of the Order of the Arrow from 1997 to 1998 and was a member of the Lodge. During his time as National Chief, Moser was instrumental in promoting the values of the Order of the Arrow, including service to others and the importance of scouting. The Lodge has hosted a number of National Order of the Arrow Conferences at the University of Tennessee, including NOACs in 1977, 1992, 2000, and 2022.

=== Lodge Functions ===
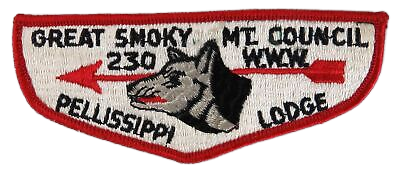
The original Lodge Flap of the Pellissippi Lodge.

The lodge hosts a number of events per year that center around fellowship and service. These include: Fall and Spring Fellowship, Summer Bash, Winter Banquet, and Conclave

The lodge also holds two Ordeals (May and August) to induct elected candidates for membership.
