= Council (Scouting America) =

Local councils of the Boy Scouts of America

Scouting America Councils
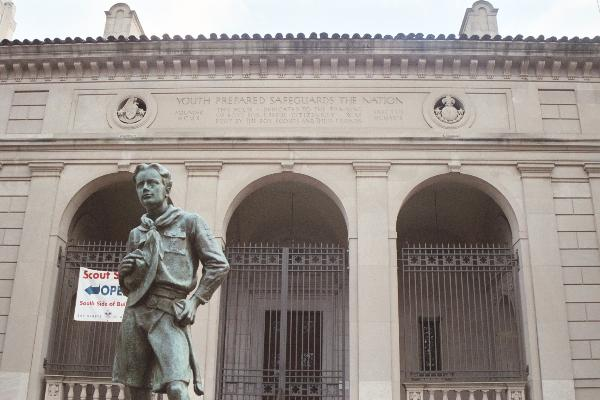
- The Ideal Scout, a statue by R. Tait McKenzie in front of the Bruce S. Marks Scout Resource Center in the Cradle of Liberty Council in Philadelphia

The Scouting programs of Scouting America is administered through 248 councils, with each council covering a geographic area that may vary from a single city to an entire state. Each council receives an annual charter from the National Council and is usually incorporated as a charitable organization. Most councils are administratively divided into geographic districts that directly serve Scouting units.

Councils previously fall into one of four regions: Western, Central, Southern, and Northeast. Each region is then subdivided into areas. The total number of councils depends on how they are counted:

- There are 248 individual local councils
- Direct Service covers units outside of local councils— although technically not a council it is assigned a council number
- Greater New York Councils has five boroughs, each with an assigned council number
- Michigan Crossroads Council has four field service councils, each with an assigned council number

== Organization ==
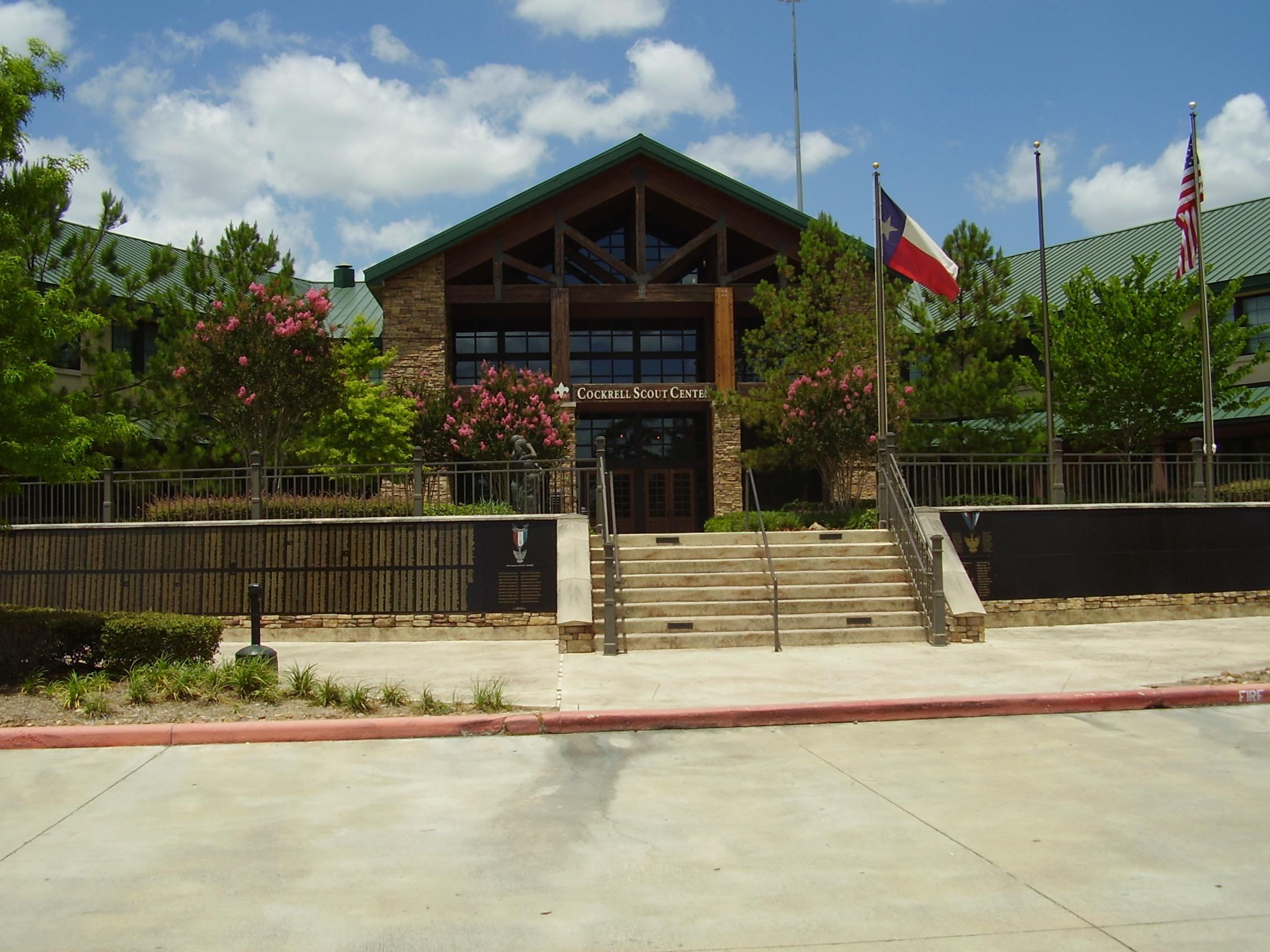
Cockrell Scout Center of the Sam Houston Area Council

The council level organization is similar to that of the National Council. Councils are headed by a collective of three people known as the 'Key 3'. The Key 3 consists of the Scout executive, a paid employee who administers a staff of professional Scouters; a council president, a volunteer, serves as the chairman of a volunteer board of directors; and a council commissioner, also a volunteer, coordinates the efforts of trained volunteers who provide direct service to the units (Cub Scout packs, Scouts BSA troops, Venturing crews, Sea Scouts ships, Exploring Posts.).

The council executive board is headed by the council president and is made up of annually elected local community leaders. The board establishes the council program and carries out the resolutions, policies, and activities of the council. Board members serve without pay and some are volunteer Scouters working at the unit level. Youth members may be selected to the council executive board according to the council by-laws.

The Scout Executive manages council operations—including finance, property management, advancement and awards, registrations, and Scout Shop sales—with a staff of other professionals and para-professionals. Volunteer commissioners lead the unit service functions of the council, help maintain the standards of Scouting America, and assures a healthy unit program.

Councils are divided into districts with leadership provided by the district executive, district chairman, and the district commissioner. Districts are directly responsible for the operation of Scouting units and, except for the district executive, are mostly staffed with volunteers. The voting members of each district consist of volunteer representatives from each chartered organization having at least one Scouting America unit, plus annually elected members-at-large who in turn elect the district chairman. Boroughs and districts are subdivisions of the local council and do not have a separate corporate status.

== History ==
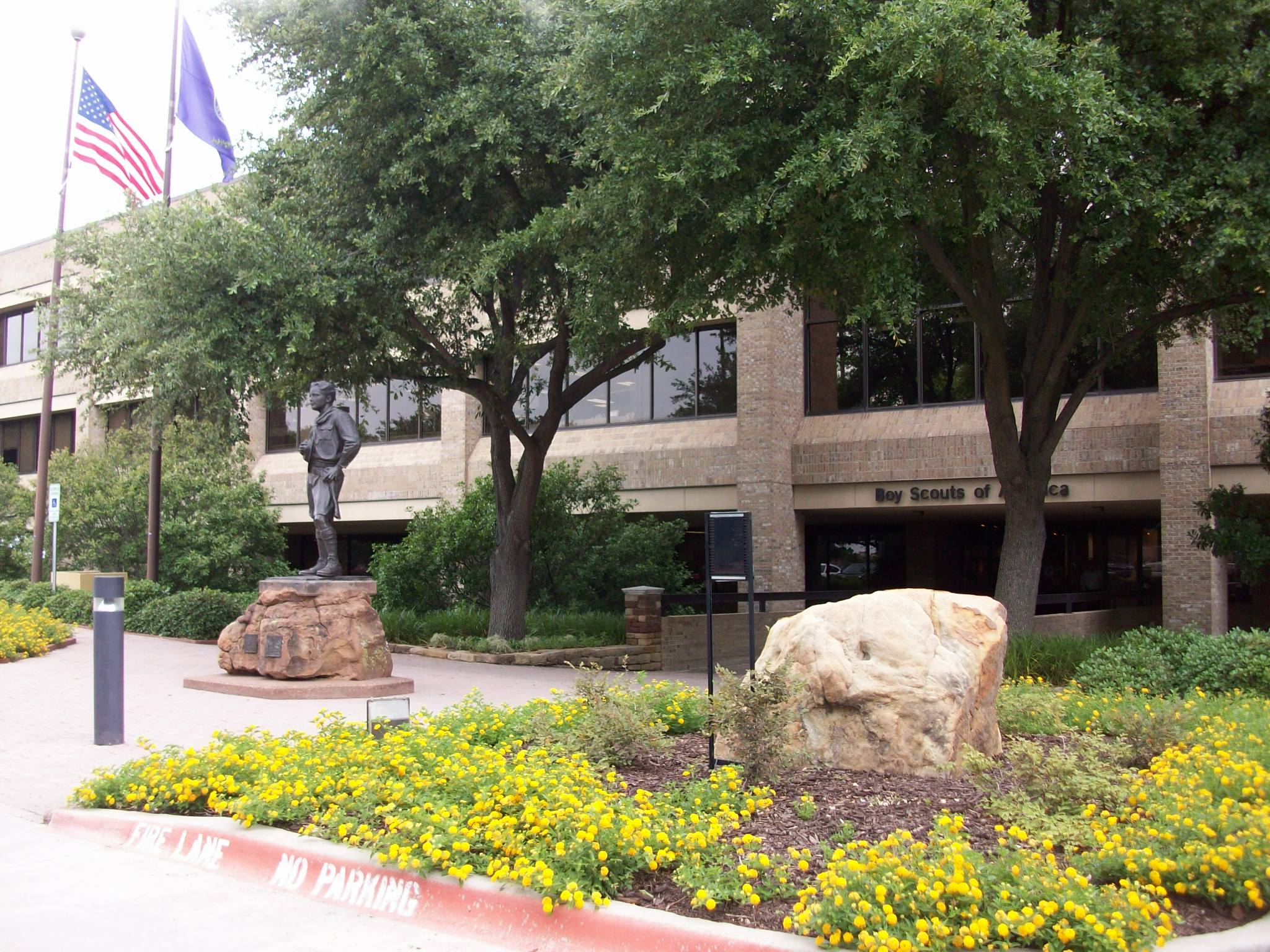
Scouting America National Council office in Irving, Texas

At the time of its incorporation in 1910, and for the first three years of the Scouting America's existence, local councils were formed by any group of men who felt that a Scouting council was needed in their community. Later, local councils could only be formed by charter.

In 1913, the first local council charters were issued to first-class and second-class councils.

First class councils were located in America's largest cities at that time: New York City, Boston, Washington DC, and Chicago.

A second class council, [like the Kingsville Council], utilized volunteers or part-timers while first class councils had a full-time Scout Executive. A first class council had to serve a population of about 25,000 and raise $5,000 to cover its first year of operation.

— South Texas Council, South Texas BSA

Other locations received charters to operate "Area Councils," which served entire states and portions of other states: Philadelphia, Atlanta, Denver, Seattle, Los Angeles, and various others.

At first, local councils were known by names rather than by numbers. The practice of giving a name to a council (e.g., Portland Council in Maine, formed in 1925) continued until Scouting underwent an explosion of interest in the late 1920s/early 1930s, which resulted in a larger number of local councils being formed. Scouting America records note that more than 100 local councils were formed in 1931 alone.

Local councils vary in size, sometimes dramatically. Thatcher Woods Council in the western suburbs of Chicago, for example, consisted of eleven city blocks and a small county forest tract. Santa Ana's Orange County Council is defined by the borders of Orange County and encompasses a large, densely populated urban area. The Katahdin Area Council of north-central Maine consists of nearly 18,000 square miles and represents almost one-third of the population and two-thirds of the land area of the state of Maine; it is the largest council east of the Mississippi River. The Philippines Council encompassed the entire Philippines archipelago, making it one of the few councils that comprised an entire nation.

By the end of the 1930s, Scouting America had catalogued more than 750 local councils, which made managing and tracking individual "named" councils challenging. In order to better track organizational growth, in the early 1940s the national office undertook a study to determine the best way to manage the myriad councils that now made up the organization.

The first phase of the Scouting America's restructuring occurred in 1945. At first, the nation had been divided into eight districts. That year, the Scouting America divided the nation into twelve regions, each with a Roman numeral to distinguish themselves from the council number (Region I - XII). Councils in each Region were identified by headquarters city and state. A resolution at the National Meeting in 1945 obligated the Scouting America to assign council numbers only to those councils within the continental US; those councils located outside the United States were not assigned a council number. In 1949 there were 543 councils.

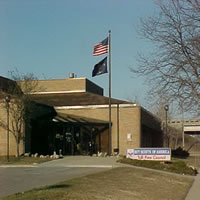
Michigan Crossroads Council Flint Service Center

In 1959, the addition of Alaska and Hawaii as the 49th and 50th states, respectively, disrupted the numbering system and made it much less prominent. Councils generally resumed use of geographical names (e.g., the Flint River Council or the Four Lakes Council) and provided their council number only when giving annual data to the central organization. Use of numbers to identify councils fell into further disuse when some of the smaller local councils found that it was in their best interest to combine with neighboring councils; for example, the Cumberland Council in Somerset, Kentucky combined with the Bluegrass Council in Lexington, Kentucky, and three Councils in northwest Texas combined to become the Northwest Texas Council.

As a result of such mergers, by 1960 Scouting America had 490 local Councils, a significant reduction from 532 in 1932. Circa 1960, Scouting America renumbered all local Councils in alphabetical order by state and headquarters city. That numbering system remains in use today. In this sequence, Council "Number 1" (not the 'oldest Scouting America Council') was originally called the Choccolocco Council that was headquartered in Anniston, Alabama. That Council, combined with two others, now forms the Greater Alabama Council, headquartered from Huntsville, Alabama. There were several breaks in the numbering sequence, resulting in the highest numeric designation being council 639, the Jim Bridger Council in Wyoming.

Councils outside the US were given numbers that began with 800, which was assigned to the Direct Service Council. Council number 801 was assigned to the Panama Canal Zone Council; 802 was assigned to the EUCOM (later Transatlantic Council); 803 was assigned to the Far East Council; 804 was assigned to the Philippines Area Council; and 805 was initially assigned to Saudi Arabia and parts of the Middle East. Later, this region was restored to the supervision of the Direct Service Council and the number retired.

The Scouting America also encouraged districts within a council to be in numerical order by the closeness to the Council office, and units were "recommended to be numbered according to the District in which they reside". However, in 1975 the Scouting America changed its policy and authorized individual councils to provide local numbers as they saw fit.

In 1967 Scouting America expanded its council numbers above 639, when it allowed the Greater New York Councils, consisting of the five boroughs in New York City along with the City itself their own Council number (NYC, #640; then in alphabetical order, Bronx, Brooklyn, Manhattan, Queens, and Staten Island). In 1971, Scouting America started a new row of Council numbers starting with the Rainbow Council in Morris, Illinois (#702).

In 1976, Scouting America allowed the Boston Council and the other councils surrounding Boston (Cambridge, Minuteman, and North Bay) to form a "consolidated council" similar to the way that New York City and the five boroughs were organized. This consolidated council was designated as council 850. However, the effort failed and the councils split again in 1979; eventually the Boston, Cambridge and Minuteman merged into the Boston Minuteman Council, while North Bay became part of the Yankee Clipper, until Boston Minuteman and Yankee Clipper merged to become the Spirit of Adventure Council.

== Councils by size ==
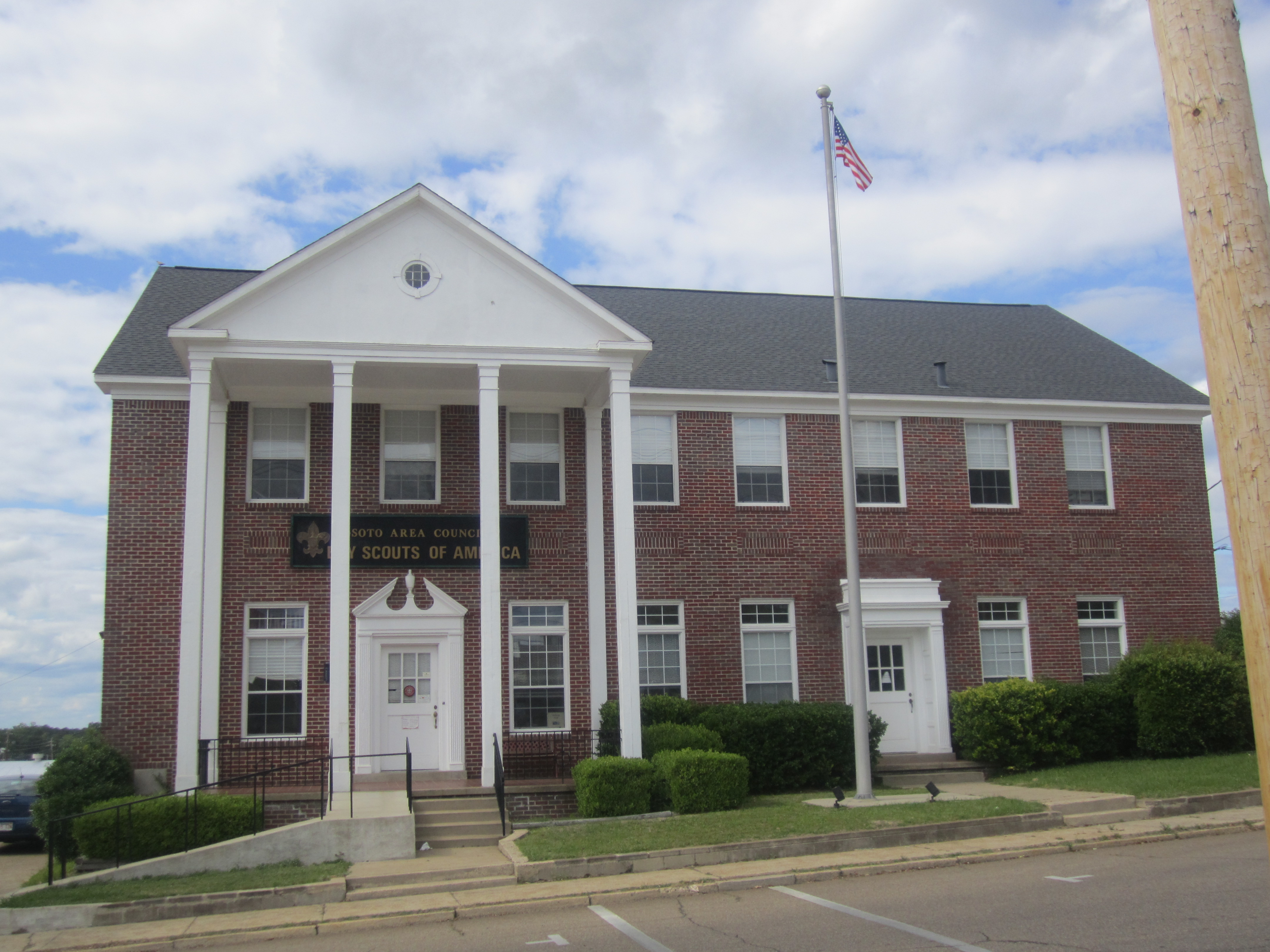
De Soto Area Council in El Dorado, Arkansas

Scouting America categorizes councils by size. Currently, there are five categories of council: (1) Mega Councils (the top 20 local Councils by youth membership and units), (2) Metro Councils (the next 20 or so local Councils), (3) Medium Councils, (4) Small Market Councils, and (5) Community Councils, which are the smallest, normally taking in large neighborhoods or one or two cities. Geographically, a council like the Montana Council serving most of the state of Montana, or the Midnight Sun Council serving the interior of Alaska have the largest coverage areas, but relatively few Scouts. Council size may also fluctuate because of mergers, like the repeated merger and splitting of the Monterey Bay Area Council (#025) and the Santa Clara County Council (#055).

Scouting America implements a system to classify the councils. For simplicity, the systems is based on the organization's budget.

- Class 100 – typically a $7M, $10MM+ (the largest councils)
- Class 200 – $4M to $7M
- Class 300 – $2 to $3MM
- Class 400 – $1 to $2 MM
- Class 500 – Under $1MM

The budget gives an idea of scale of management expertise needed and progressive experiences. This system was set in place circa 2000 and has not been adjusted post COVID, LDS departure and the Chapter 11 proceedings.

Each council is also assigned a grade (1–4), similar to the locality adjustment of the US civil service pay scale.

=== Largest councils ===
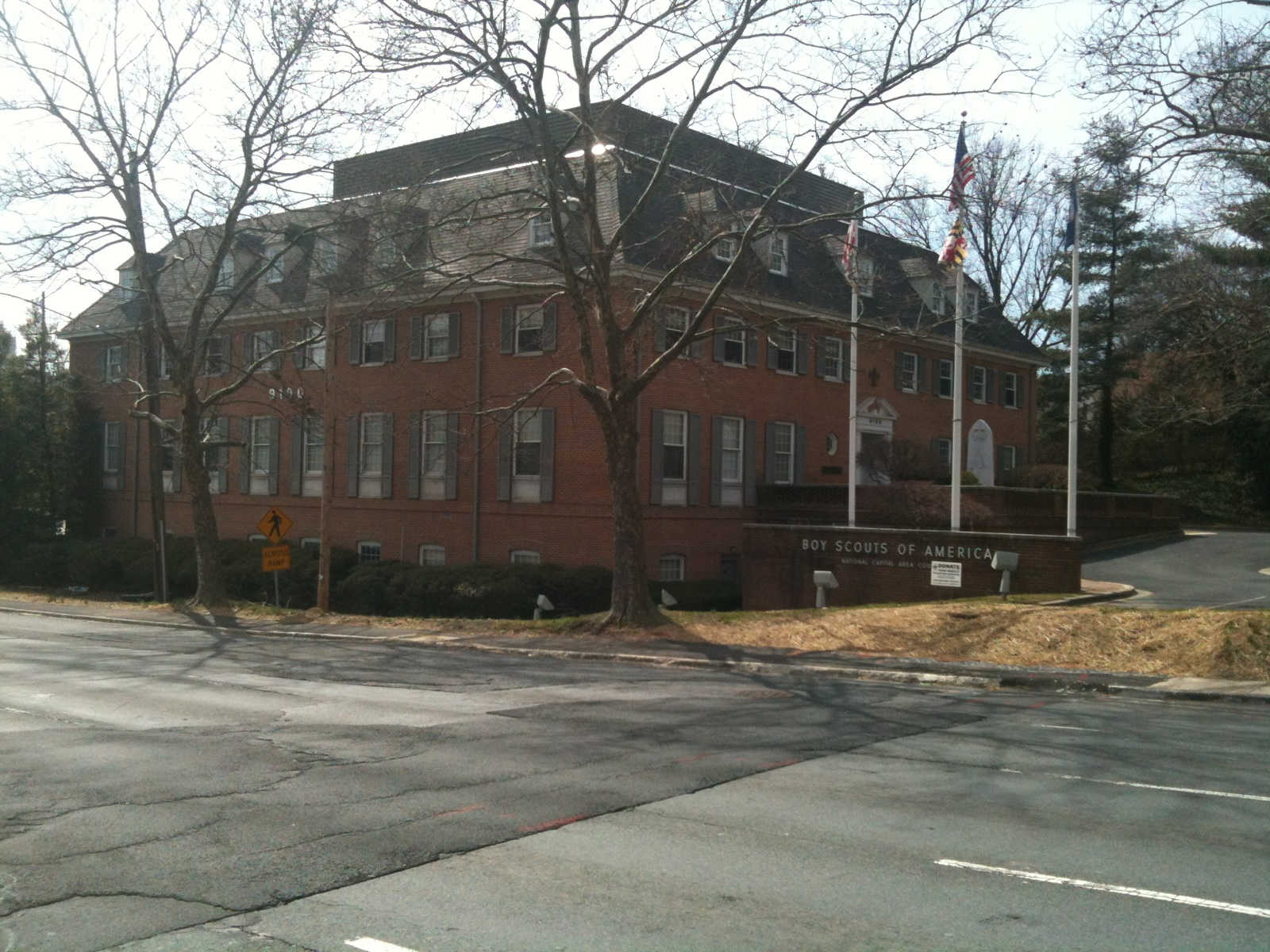
National Capital Area Council in Bethesda, Maryland

Top 10 Largest Councils of Scouting America, by Total Membership (Note: Total membership includes traditional membership (Cub Scouts, Boy Scouts, Venturers, and Sea Scouts) and Learning for Life membership.) (2009)
Rank	Council Name	Headquarters	Total Units	Total Youth
1	Greater New York Councils	New York City		
2	National Capital Area Council	Bethesda, MD		
3	Great Salt Lake Council	Salt Lake City, UT		
4	Sam Houston Area Council	Houston, TX		
5	Circle Ten Council	Dallas, TX		
6	Northern Star Council	Saint Paul, MN		
7	Utah National Parks Council	Orem, UT		
8	South Florida Council	Miami Lakes		
9	Central Florida Council	Apopka		
10	Cradle of Liberty Council	Philadelphia		

Top 10 Largest Councils of Scouting America, by Traditional Membership (Note: Traditional membership includes members from Cub Scouting, Boy Scouting, Venturing, and Sea Scouting, but does not include Learning for Life membership.) (April 2016)
Rank	Council Name	Headquarters	Total Units	Total Youth
1	Utah National Parks Council	Orem, UT		72,915
2	Michigan Crossroads Council	Lansing, MI		67,431
3	Great Salt Lake Council	Salt Lake City, UT		56,633
4	Trapper Trails Council	Ogden, UT		43,553
5	National Capital Area Council	Bethesda, MD		37,901
6	Grand Canyon Council	Phoenix, AZ		35,627
7	Sam Houston Area Council	Houston, TX		35,134
8	Circle Ten Council	Dallas, TX		30,938
9	Northern Star Council	Saint Paul, MN		26,924
10	Heart of America Council	Kansas City, MO		22,240

=== Smallest councils ===
Smallest Councils of Scouting America, by size
Name of Organization	Headquarters	Total Units	Total Youth	Rank
Piedmont Council	Piedmont			1

The Piedmont Council is the last small council after the Alameda Council and Cambridge Council merged with larger councils.

The Greenwich Council serves the single town of Greenwich, Connecticut.

== Unique councils ==
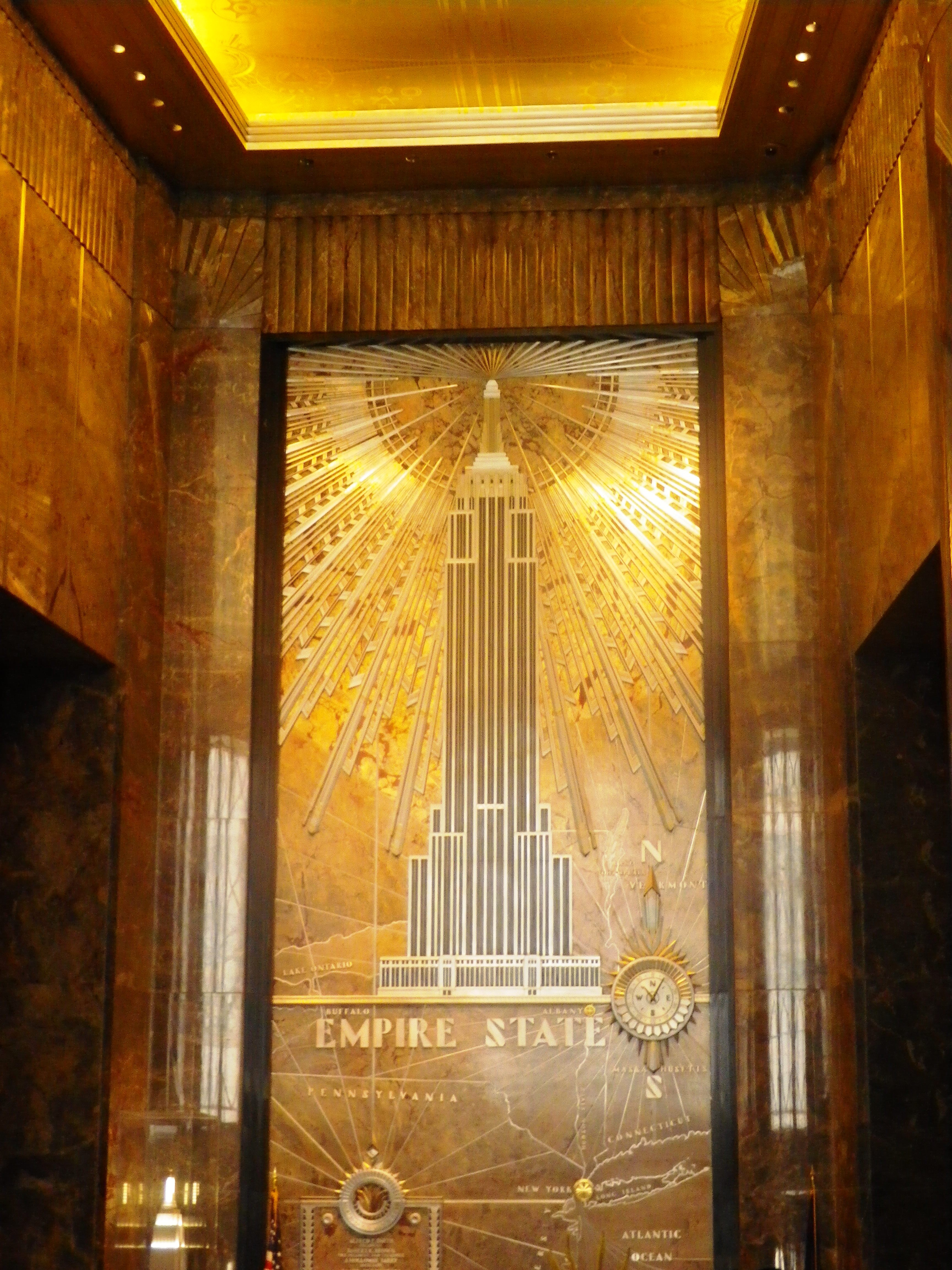
The Greater New York Council office is located in the Empire State Building

The Greater New York Councils is the only council in the nation divided into smaller councils. It is divided into five borough councils with each led by a field director and one or more district directors or district executives. Conversely, due to Scouting population and geographic distance, the Utah National Parks Council is organized into 39 districts divided among 12 geographic sectors, with each led by a volunteer assistant vice president and assistant council commissioner with each sector.

The organization of the councils in Area 2 of the Central Region is unique to Michigan. The Michigan Crossroads Council was created by the merger of nine councils in the lower peninsula of Michigan. It was a coordinating council that oversaw properties, personnel, and program. This MCC was then split into four sub-councils or "Field Service Councils" which were then divided into districts. In 2019, plans to combine the four sub- councils into two regions we're announced. The lower peninsula, excluding parts of Berrien and Cass county, is now all under the Michigan Crossroads Council.

== Overseas areas ==
Far East Council areas served

Scouting America charters two councils for American Scouts living overseas, largely on military bases in Europe and Asia. The Transatlantic Council, headquartered in Brussels, Belgium, serves Scouting America units in much of Europe, Africa, Middle East, and Central Asia. While the Far East Council, headquartered at Camp Zama in Japan, serves units in the western Pacific areas, including Japan, South Korea, Taiwan, Hong Kong, China, Okinawa, Thailand, Philippines, Singapore, Malaysia, India, Vietnam, Australia, New Zealand, Cambodia, Indonesia and Bangladesh. The Aloha Council in Hawaii also serves Scouting America units in the American territories of American Samoa, Guam, the Northern Mariana Islands and in the sovereign countries of the Federated States of Micronesia, the Marshall Islands, and Palau.

The Direct Service branch enables U.S. citizens and their dependents abroad to access Scouting programs in other locations and in isolated areas, including the Interamerican Region (North, Central, and South America, and the Caribbean). Direct Service is managed by the National Capital Area Council.

== Defunct councils ==
The local councils have gone through thousands of name changes, merges, splits and re-creations since the establishment of the Boy Scouts of America in 1910.

== See also ==
- Council shoulder patch
- Local council camps of the Boy Scouts of America
- National Service Territories
