= Scouting in Wyoming =

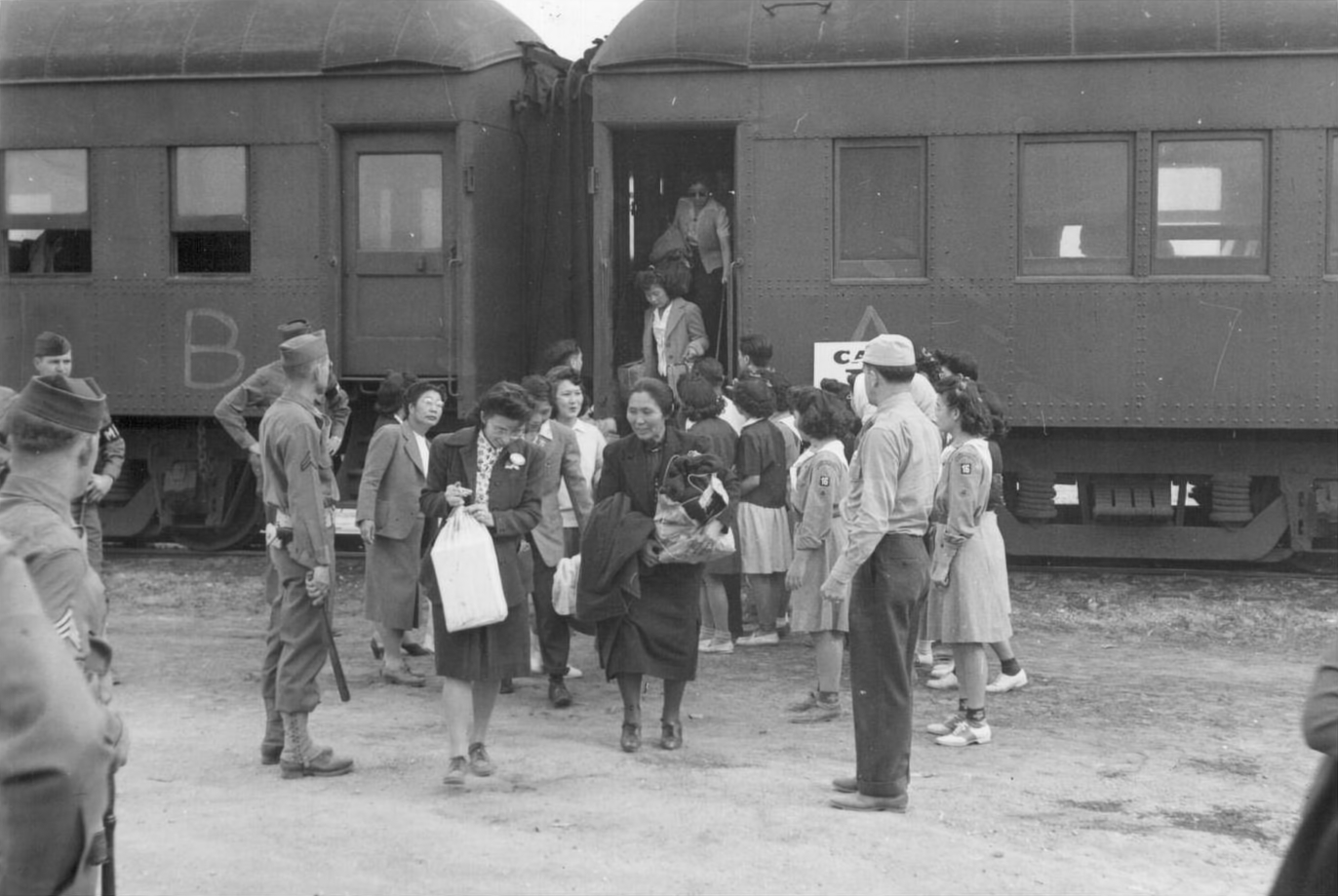
- Arrivals at Heart Mountain leaving train assisted by Girl Scout with their baggage.

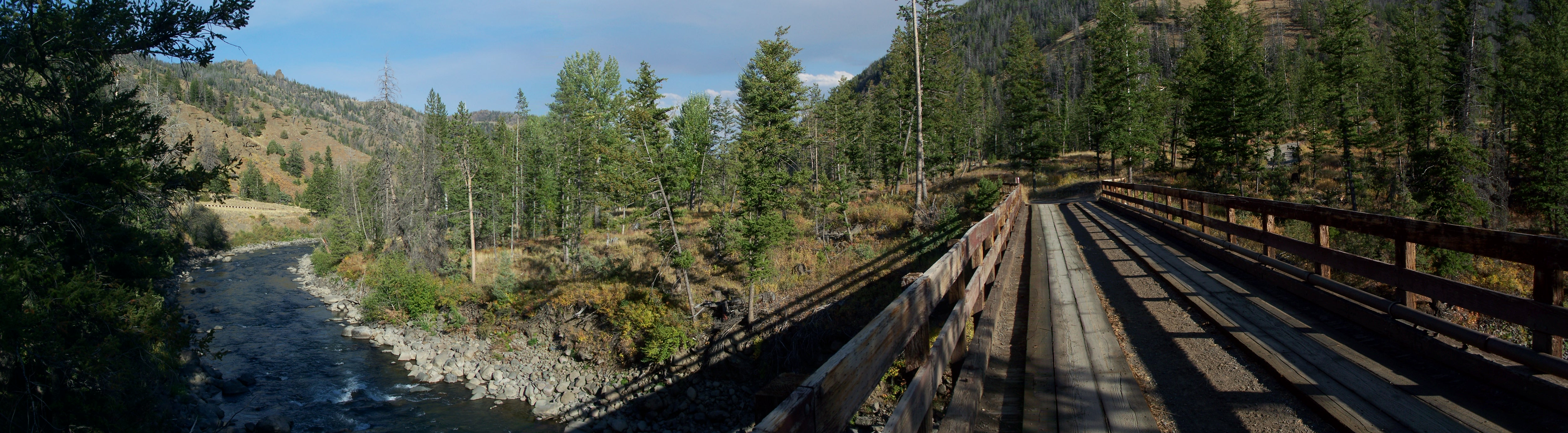
- Bridge taking you to the Camp Buffalo Bill

Scouting in Wyoming has a long history, from the 1910s to the present day, serving thousands of youth in programs that suit the environment in which they live.

== Early history (1910–1950) ==
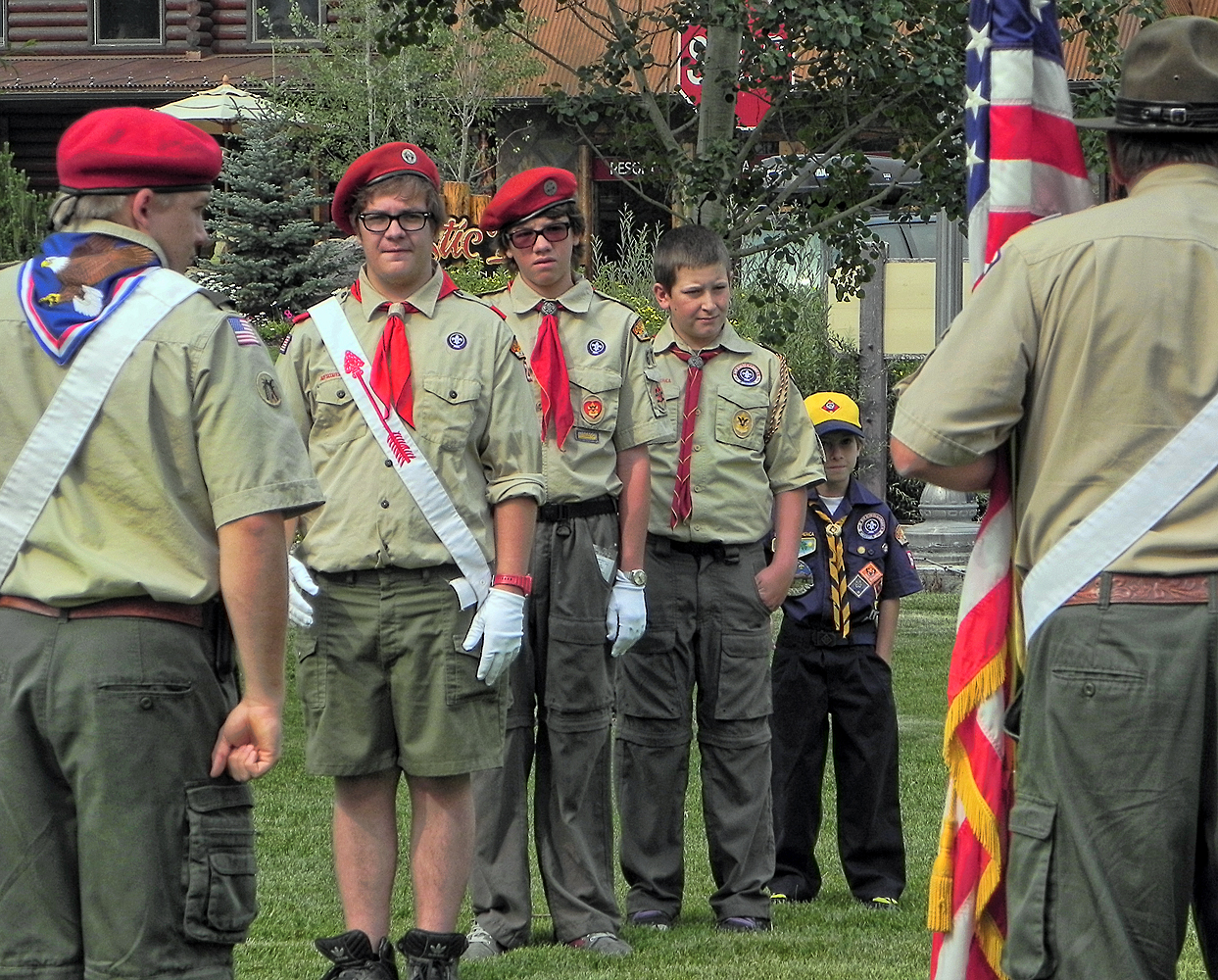
Jackson District Boy Scouts line up as they prepare to carry the US and Wyoming flags into the National Elk Refuge's centennial ceremony

The Cheyenne Council was founded in 1920, and in 1925 changed its name to the Southeastern Wyoming Council. The Council merged into Longs Peak Council in 1928.

In 1917, the Casper Council (#638) was formed, changing its name to Casper Area Council in 1925. It reformed in 1918, merging into Central Wyoming Council (#638) in 1931.

In 1920, the Sheridan Council (#640), changing its name to Sheridan County Council in 1922; changing its name again to Sheridan Area Council in 1926.

In 1929, the Central Wyoming Council (#638) was formed.

In southwestern Wyoming the Jim Bridger Council was headquartered in Rock Springs, Wy. The Jim Bridger Council had a Scout Camp at New Fork Lakes on the northwestern slope of the Wind River Mountains. The Jim Bridger Council encompassed the Green River Basin and included the Woodruff and Randolph Utah Area. Towns included in the council were Rock Springs, Green River, Pinedale, Big Piney, Kemmerer, Opal, Mountain View, Lyman, Fort Bridger and Evanston. The council was merged with two councils in Utah in the early 1990s. The council was home to Order of the Arrow Lodge 529 – Tatanka.

During World War II, Norman Mineta was detained in the Heart Mountain internment camp near Cody, Wyoming, along with thousands of other Japanese immigrants and Japanese Americans. While detained in the camp, Mineta, a Boy Scout, met fellow Scout Alan K. Simpson, future U.S. Senator from Wyoming, who often visited the Scouts in the internment camp with his troop. The two became, and have remained, close friends and political allies.

== Recent history (1950–1990) ==
In 1954 the National Order of the Arrow Conference was held at the University of Wyoming.

== Boy Scouts of America in Wyoming today ==
There are four Scouting America (BSA) local councils in Wyoming.

=== Black Hills Area Council ===
Black Hills Area Council serves Scouts in South Dakota and Wyoming. Black Hills Area Council is headquartered in Rapid City, South Dakota.

=== Adventure West Council ===
Adventure West Council
- Owner: Scouting America
- Headquarters: Greeley, Colorado
- Country: United States
- Website https://adventurewestscouts.org/

In May 2021 Greater Wyoming Council merged with Longs Peak Council to form the Adventure West Council. Spanning over half of the state of Wyoming, the Greater Wyoming Council (Central Wyoming Council before 2016) provides service for boys from age 8 to 21. Greater Wyoming Council is headquartered in Casper, Wyoming.

==== Organization ====
The Council is composed of seven Districts.

- Bighorn
- Frontier
- Golden Plains
- Shoshone
- Thunder Basin
- Tri-Trails
- Wapiti

==== Camps ====
Camp Buffalo Bill
- Owner: Scouting America
- Country: United States
- Coordinates: 44.456207°N 109.8456°W
- Website campbuffalobill.com

Camp Buffalo Bill lies seven miles east of the East Gate of Yellowstone National Park in the Shoshone National Forest. The camp is ideal for troops wishing to have both a Scout camp experience and tour the nation's first national park. Camp Buffalo Bill is also the home of the Yellowstone High Adventure Outpost, a high adventure program where scouts can participate in one of four core areas: Trek, Climbing, Paddlesports, and Winter.

=== Grand Teton Council ===
Grand Teton Council is the result of a merger between the Tendoy Area Council and Idaho Falls Council, and serves Scouts in both Idaho and Wyoming.

=== Trapper Trails Council ===
The Trapper Trails Council is headquartered in Ogden, Utah. Trapper Trails Council was formed from a merger between Jim Bridger Council, Lake Bonneville Council and Cache Valley Area Council, and serves Scouts in southwestern Wyoming, southern Idaho, and northern Utah.

== Girl Scouting in Wyoming ==
Girl Scouting in Wyoming
- Map of Girl Scout Council in Wyoming
- Owner: Boy Scouts of America
- Headquarters: Casper, Wyoming
- Country: United States

The Girl Scouts of Montana and Wyoming with headquarters in Billings, Montana serves Wyoming. There is a service center in Casper, Wyoming as well as several camps.

== See also ==
- Scouting in Idaho
- Scouting in Montana
- Scouting in Utah
