= Camp Wilderness =

Camp Wilderness may be:

- Camp Wilderness (Michigan)
- Camp Wilderness (Minnesota)
- Camp Wilderness (Utah)
