= Camp Tracy =

Camp Tracy may be:

- Camp Tracy (California)
- Camp Tracy (Utah)
