= Lake Ini-To =

- Location within Georgia Location within the United States
- Coordinates: 32.966475°N 84.500030°W
- Type: artificial lake
- Primary inflows: Thundering Spring and Fishing Lake
- Primary outflows: Spring Creek
- Surface area: 15.9 acres (6.4 hectares)
- Shore length^{1}: 4,075 feet (1,242 m)
- Settlements: Molena, Georgia
- ^{1} Shore length is not a well-defined measure.

Lake Ini-To is an artificial lake located in Molena, Georgia at the Boy Scouts of America camp, Camp Thunder, on the Gerald Lawhorn Scouting Base. The lake is fed by the Thundering Spring and a smaller pond called the Fishing Lake. Subsequently, the lake outflows into Spring Creek and several other small creeks. The lake serves as the primary waterfront for the camp. Swimming and boating are common activities on the lake. However, fishing is restricted on the lake. Catch and release fishing is instead allowed on the Fishing Lake.

Due to the lack of a GNIS entry on the body of water, the name of the lake is not completely official. However, the name is used by those in the area, as well as the camp it serves, as shown on maps of the camp and area.
