= Springbar =

American brand of canvas tent from 1961

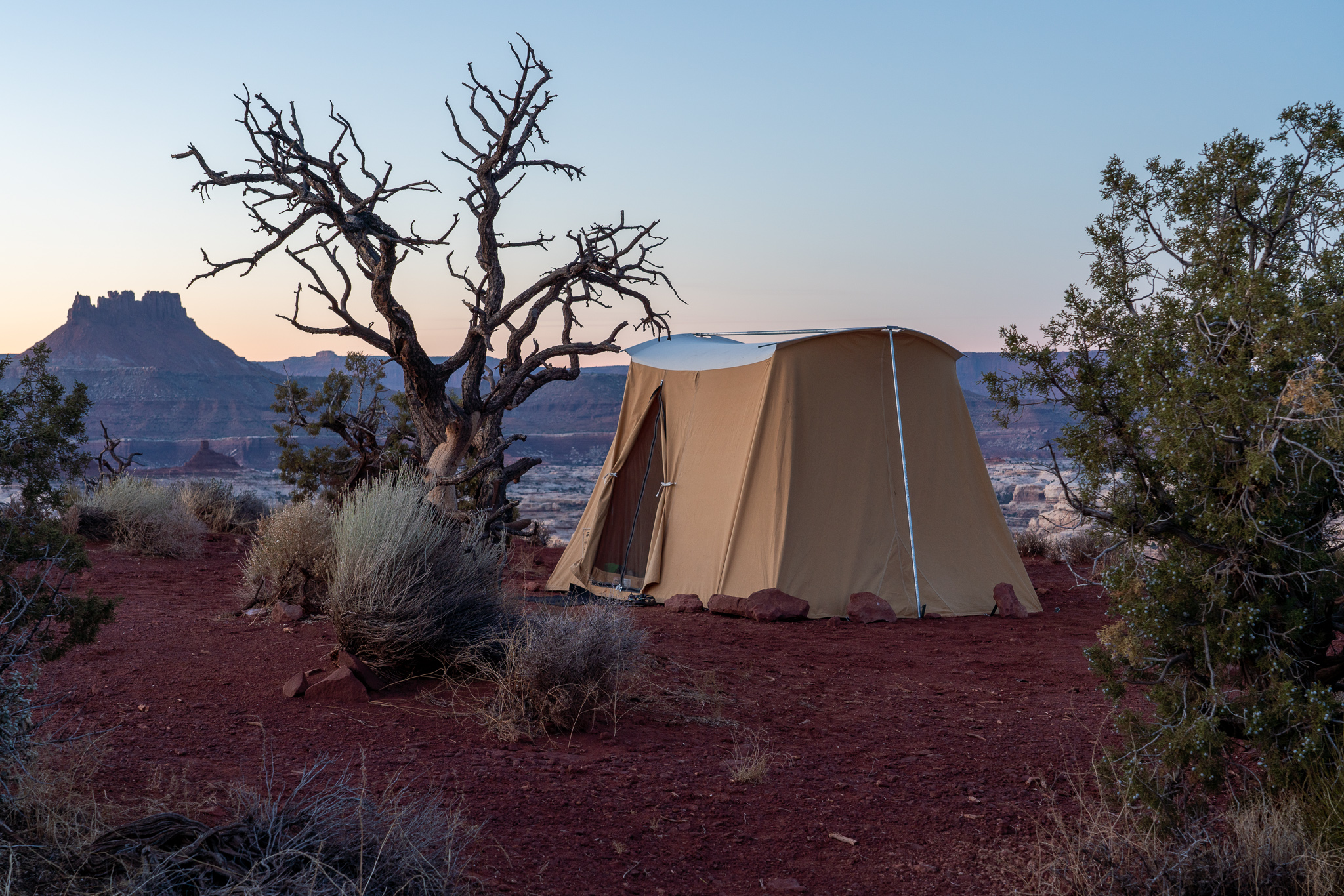
Springbar Canvas Vagabond Tent

Springbar is an American brand of canvas tent. The original Springbar tent dates back to 1961, when Arthur Jack Kirkham Sr. created the first Springbar tent design, which he sold through his company AAA Tent & Awning Co. Kirkham's design was intended to allow for easy setup, enhanced durability, and comfort. It is defined by a support system that combines tension and flexibility, as well as its simple style. Springbar is one of the oldest canvas tent manufacturers in the U.S. and is one of the oldest outdoor equipment manufacturers in Utah.

== History ==
Springbar began as AAA Tent & Awning Co. in 1944, when Arthur Jack Kirkham Sr. purchased the company upon his return to Salt Lake City after serving as a Naval draftsman in the U.S. military during World War II.

In the 1950s, as car camping began to grow in popularity, Kirkham Sr. began working on a tent design that would be easier to set up than the traditional pole-and-rope style tents of the time and provide room to move around in. He invented the original “Springbar” canvas tent in 1961, which was easy to pitch, yet durable, and had a spacious interior.

In 1966, Coleman Co. became the first brand to license to manufacture and sell its own Springbar canvas tents under a licensing agreement. In 1976, the company entered into an agreement with British company KEB International to distribute Springbar tents.

The company was renamed Springbar in 2019 and moved to its current location, in Millcreek, Utah, where the company continues to manufacture many of its Springbar canvas tents by hand. Springbar tents are also manufactured in the company's partner factory in China.

Springbar canvas tents have been used on numerous outdoor expeditions, including at Mount Everest base camps, and many have been purchased by the Utah National Parks Council over the years. In the 1970s, Western River Expeditions began offering trips to Micronesia in Springbar modular tents.

During the COVID-19 pandemic, in 2020, Springbar began sewing personal protective equipment, including medical gowns, for healthcare workers treating COVID-19 patients.

== Products ==
The first Springbar tent model, which is still known as the “Traveler,” was 10 by 10 feet, weighed 60 pounds, and cost $83 in 1962. Kirkham Sr. improved upon the Springbar design over the years and, from it, created models of varying sizes and features — from a two-person tent to a large modular tent called the Leisure Port, which campers could add rooms onto. The Springbar tent design has remained largely unchanged over the years and has inspired a number of other Springbar models.

Springbar tents are defined by a support system that combines tension and flexibility, which includes pole reinforcements and tension rods made with spring steel. The tent's exterior is made of 100 percent cotton duck canvas and features lap-felled seams. They can be more expensive and heavier than other competitors.

Springbar tents have been widely noted among outdoor enthusiasts, brands and publications for their easy set up, functionality and versatility. They have been popular over the years among backwoods and car campers, outfitters, and horse packers. Outdoor publications, including Field & Stream, have cited the ability of Springbar tents to withstand the elements, including strong winds, rains, and snow.
