= Scouting in Utah =

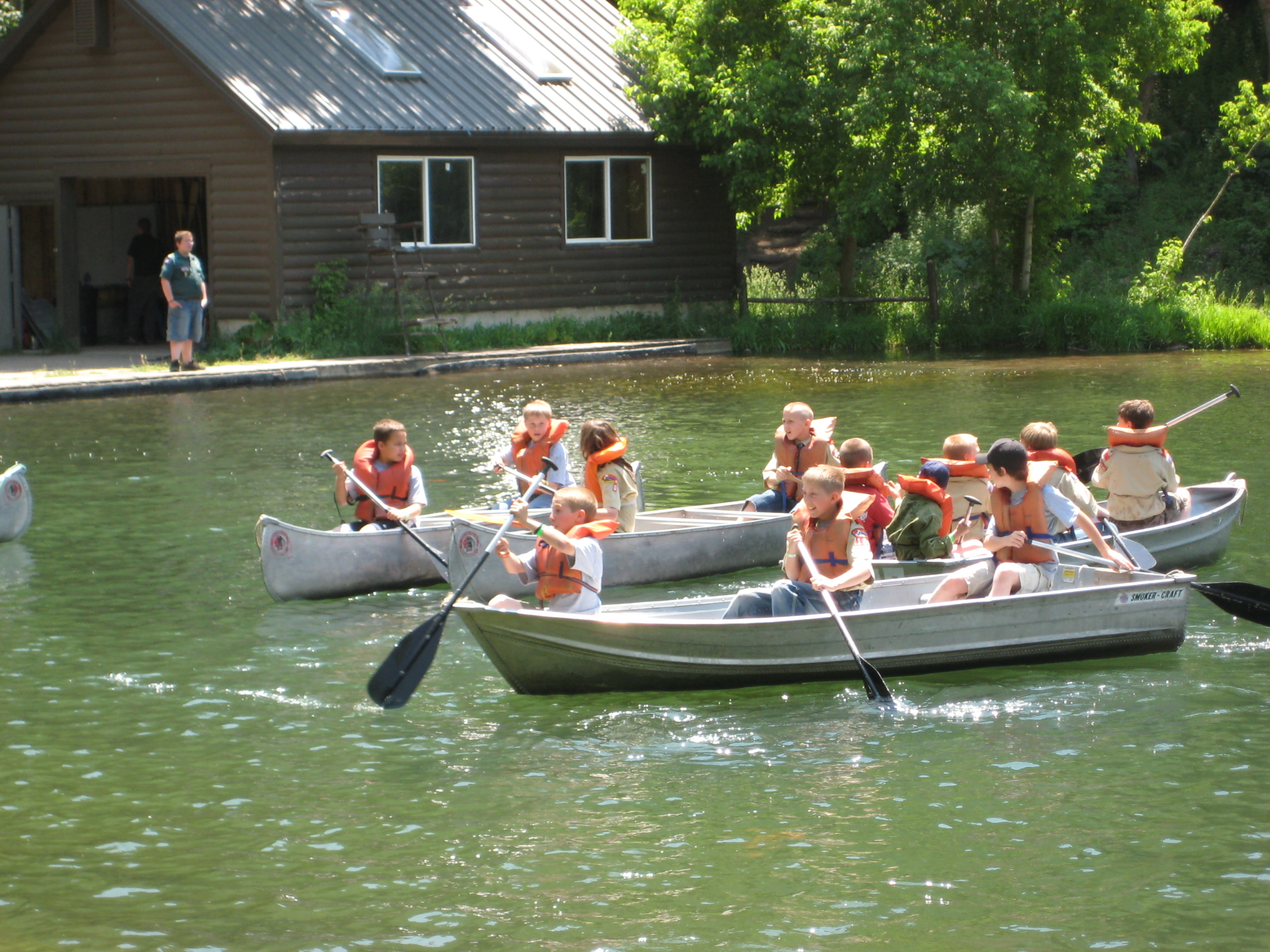
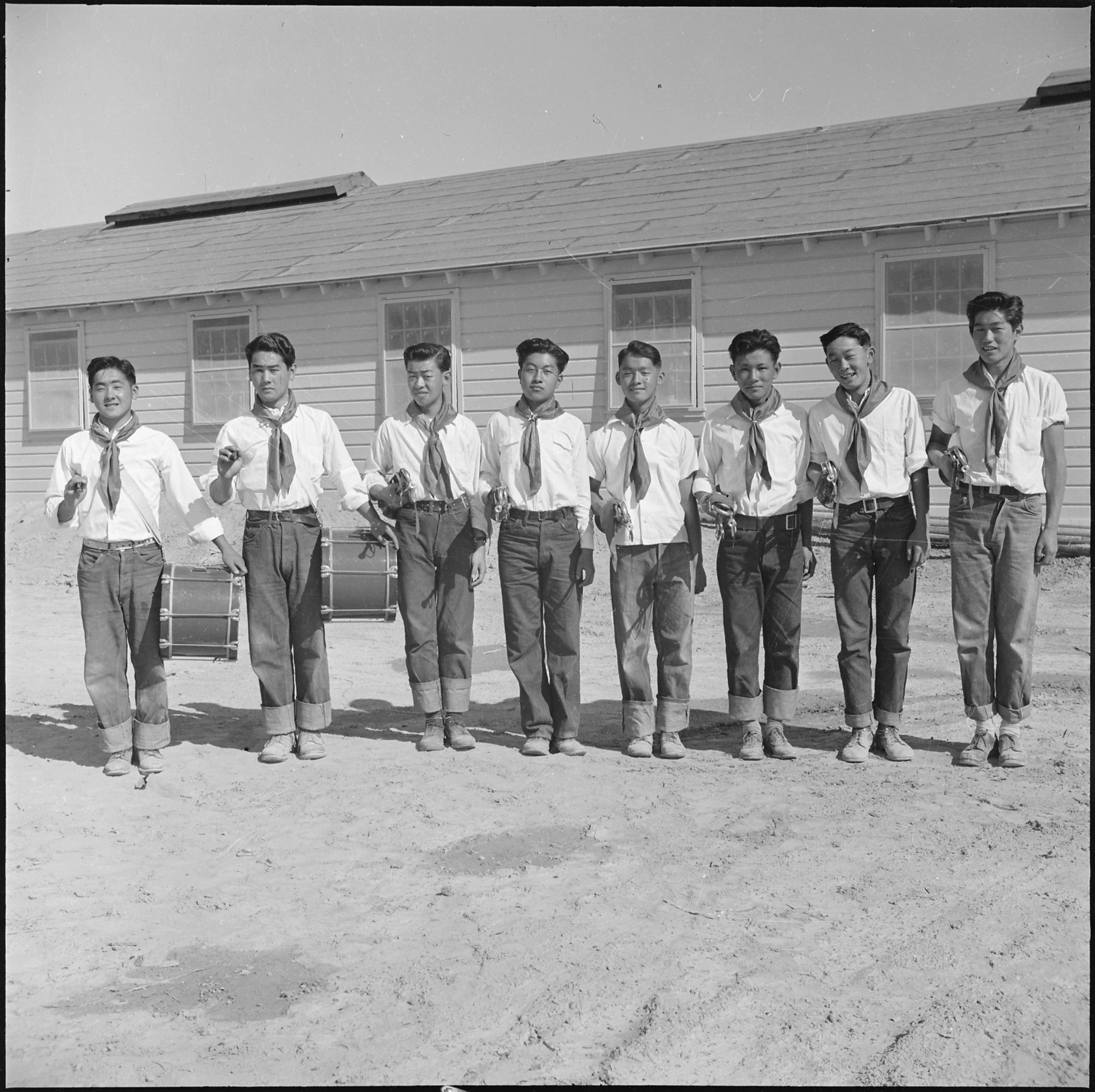
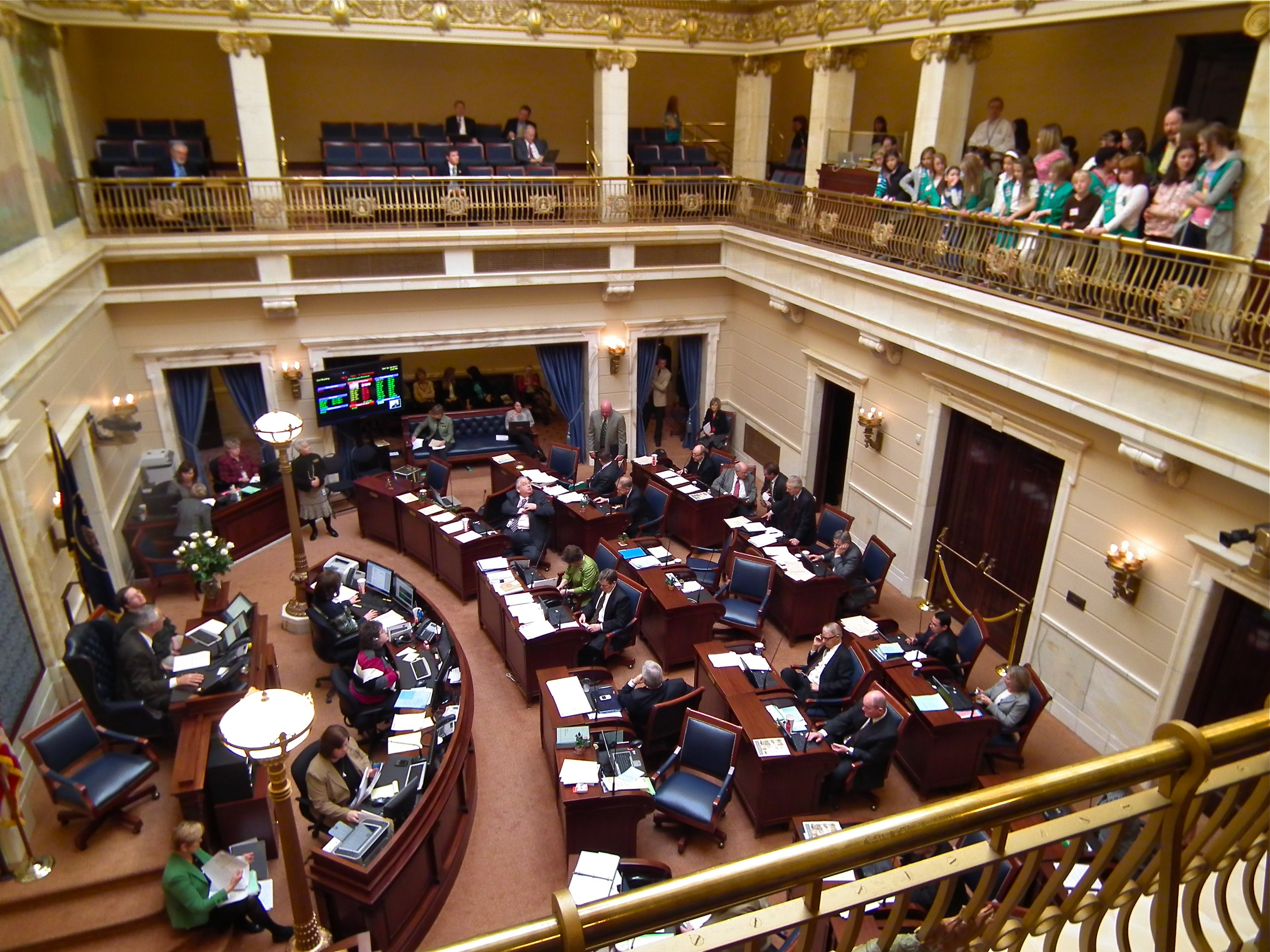
- Scouts at Camp Tracy Scouts at Topaz Center Girl Scouts

Scouting in Utah has a long history, from the 1910s to the present day, serving thousands of youth in programs that suit the environment in which they live.

== History ==
The first known Boy Scout Troop was the Episcopalian Troop One led by Reverend Rice, a missionary to Utah. This troop assembled in 1907 and continued their meetings and camp-outs through 1910. The second known Boy Scout Troop got its start in Logan, Utah in 1910.

On May 21, 1913, The Church of Jesus Christ of Latter-day Saints' 15-month-old "Mutual Improvement Association Scout" program was officially invited to join the Boy Scouts of America. This started the first widespread movement in Utah Scouting. By 1928, the LDS Church had designated Scouting as the official activity program for its young men.

In 1916, the Logan Council (#588) was formed. It changed its name to the Cache Valley Council (#588) in 1922, changing it again in 1924 to Cache Valley Area Council (#588). In 1919, the Ogden Council (#589) was formed. It changed its name to the Ogden Gateway Area Council (#589) in 1922, changing it again in 1934 to Ogden Area Council (#589). In 1951, the Ogden Area Council changed its name Lake Bonneville Council (#589).

In 1920, Ogden Council Scout Executive, G.A. Goates, led 85 boys and Scoutmasters on a 14-day hike through Yellowstone National Park. According to the Department of the Interior, 3,800 feet of motion picture film was taken of the trip.

In 1916, the Salt Lake City Council (#590) was formed. It changed its name to the Salt Lake and South Davis Counties Council (#590) in 1926, changing it again in 1926 to Salt Lake City Area Council (#590). In 1951 it changed its name to Great Salt Lake Council (#590). In 1921, the Utah County Council (#591) was formed. In 1922 it changed its name to the Timpanagos Area Council (#591). In 1924, the Zion National Park Council (#670) was formed. In 1930 it merged with Timpanagos Area Council. In 1924, the Bryce Canyon Council (#671) was formed. In 1936 it merged with Timpanagos Area Council to become the Utah National Parks Council (#591).

Until its withdrawal in 2019, the Church of Jesus Christ of Latter-day Saints remained a major sponsor of Scouting in Utah, however churches of other faiths, and other non-profit organizations continue to be sponsors of Utah Scouting programs. Most, if not all troops welcome those of all faiths to their program.

Until 1993, the Lake Bonneville Council and Cache Valley Council covered northern Utah. Those councils merged with the Jim Bridger Council (#639) to become the Trapper Trails Council. Along with the Great Salt Lake Council of central Utah and the Utah National Parks Council of southern Utah, the Trapper Trails Council became part of the Crossroads of the West Council (#590) in 2020 following the withdrawal of the LDS Church from scouting. The Snake River Council served Scouts in Idaho and Nevada, as well as Utah, prior to its merger into the Mountain West Council.

== Boy Scouts of America in Utah today ==
Utah and adjacent parts of Arizona, Idaho, Nevada, and Wyoming are currently served by Scouts BSA's Crossroads of the West Council.

=== Crossroads of the West Council ===
Crossroads of the West Council (#590)
- Owner: Boy Scouts of America
- Headquarters: 1200 East 5400 South; Ogden, UT 84403
- Country: United States
- Coordinates: 41.165121°N 111.949539°W
- Founded: April 2020
- President: Ken Jeppesen
- Scout Executive: Allen Endicott
- Website www.utahscouts.org

Crossroads of the West Council serves Scouts in Utah and adjacent areas of Arizona, Nevada, Wyoming, and Idaho.

- Old Ephrain District (1) – Idaho: Franklin, Bear Lake Counties; Utah: Box Elder, Cache, Rich Counties
- Weber Rapids District (2) – Weber County; Morgan County
- Jim Bridger District (3) – Wyoming: Lincoln, Uinta, Sublette, Sweetwater Counties; Utah: Daggett County
- Thurston Peak District (4) – Davis County
- Oquirrh Mountain District (5) – Salt Lake County (West of I-15 minus Draper and Sandy); Tooele County
- Wasatch Peaks District (6) – Salt Lake County (East of I-15 including Draper and Sandy); Summit County
- Timpanogos District (7) Utah County North (Orem and all cities north); Wasatch, Duchesne, Uintah Counties
- Silver Sage District (8) – Utah County South (Provo and all cities south); Juab, Carbon, Emery, Grand, San Juan Counties
- Spanish Trails District (9) – Sanpete, Millard, Sevier, Beaver, Piute, Wayne, Iron, Garfield, Washington, and Kane Counties in Utah, Lincoln County in Nevada, the Arizona Strip

=== Great Southwest Council ===
The Great Southwest Council of BSA is headquartered in Albuquerque, New Mexico, and provides Scouting to youth in northern New Mexico, northeast Arizona, Utah south of the San Juan River, and the Durango and Mesa Verde areas of Colorado.

== Girl Scouting in Utah ==
Girl Scouting in Utah
- Map of Girl Scout Councils in Utah

Two Girl Scout councils serve Utah.

=== History ===
Girl Scouting in Utah started in 1920 in Ogden, Utah and the first troops registered in Salt Lake City in 1921. In 1961 the current major council in Utah, Girl Scouts of Utah, was founded by the merging of several smaller councils.

=== Girl Scouts-Arizona Cactus-Pine Council ===
In Utah, Girl Scouts-Arizona Cactus-Pine Council, headquartered in Phoenix, Arizona, serves girls living on the Navajo Nation in southern Utah.

=== Girl Scouts of Utah ===
Girl Scouts of Utah, headquartered in Salt Lake City, serves over 9,000 girls in Utah and West Wendover, Nevada.

Service Centers

- Northern Utah Service Center in Riverdale, Utah
- Central Utah Service Center in Orem, Utah

Camps

- Camp Cloud Rim is 27 acres (0.11 km^{2}) at over 9,000 feet (2,700 m) by Lake Brimhall in the Wasatch Mountains near Park City, Utah. It was built by the Utah Works Progress Administration in the early 1930s. Originally named Camp Pinar, it was renamed to Camp Cloud Rim in 1937. The Lodge was destroyed by fire in 1992 but rebuilt and named the Janet Quinney Lawson Lodge. The new lodge was dedicated on August 14, 1999, and Janet Quinney Lawson was in attendance for the ceremony. In 2013, the Girl Scouts of Utah council officially bought 236 acres of land just south of Cloud Rim from Silver Islet Lake Partners. The land has a conservation easement on all but 18 acres, so the Girl Scouts plan to build some rustic cabins, but will mostly preserve the land.
- Trefoil Ranch is 123 acres (0.50 km^{2}) near Provo, Utah. It was built in 1943 by volunteers. In 2002, a new lodge was built and dedicated in 2003 featuring new restrooms, a classroom facility, and a new showerhouse.

== See also ==
- Operation On-Target
