= Flint River Council =

Scouting council in Georgia, US

Flint River Council (#095)
- Owner: Scouting America
- Headquarters: Griffin, Georgia
- Country: United States
- Coordinates: 33.214°N 84.28148°W
- Website www.flintrivercouncil.org

Flint River Council is a Scouting America council based in Griffin, Georgia. The council is divided into four districts Coweta, Fayette, Ronotohatchi, and Tussahaw.

== History ==
The council was founded in 1927 as the Griffin Area Council, changing its name in 1930 to Flint River.

== Organization ==
The council service center is in Griffin, Georgia. The council is administratively divided into four districts:

- Coweta District serves Coweta County
- Fayette District serves Fayette County
- Ronotohatchi District serves Lamar, Pike, Spalding and Upson counties
- Tussahaw District serves Butts and Henry counties

== Lawhorn Scouting Base ==
The Gerald L. Lawhorn Scouting Base is the council's primary camping and recreation property, made up into three major parts. Those three parts being: Camp Thunder, the Flint River Adventure Area, and the Pine Mountain Backcountry. The most well known and visited of the three being Camp Thunder.

=== Camp Thunder ===
Camp Thunder
- Owner: Flint River Council; Scouting America
- Location: 506 Thundering Springs Rd Molena, GA 30258
- Coordinates: 32.962310°N 84.498120°W
- Camp size: 2,400-acre (9.7 km^{2})
- Founded: 1938
- Website; Camp Thunder

Camp Thunder is an overnight council camp, the largest and most well known section of the scouting base, in Molena, Georgia. The camp is operated by the Flint River Council Scouting America. The scouting base is primarily known as a summer camp for the local council and the surrounding region. However, it also holds smaller winter camps and accepts troops from other councils and states for their events. Camp Thunder is the original property founded in 1938. Located on the northeast corner of the Lawhorn Scouting Base, Camp Thunder was donated to the Scouts after the property failed as a peach and cotton farm. The original property includes Thundering Spring, the 3rd most prolific springs in the state of Georgia.

The primary portion of the scouting base is centered around Lake Ini-To, an artificial lake, and the Fishing Lake. However, the scouting base as a whole is quite large in terms of Scout facilities, being close to 2,400 acres in size.

The camp and scouting base in its whole also acts as the venue for the Junior Reserve Officers' Training Corps' Raiders National Championship.

The primary program held in Camp Thunder is the annual Scouts BSA summer camp; it is the site of Lawhorn's traditional resident camp.

==== Flora and Fauna ====
Flora

The camp is located on the Piedmont Plateau of the Southern United States and the property has corresponding flora to that region. Quite common on the base are southern magnolias and various type of oak. Relatively endangered species of plants and trees can be also found around the camp and scouting base. The threatened Longleaf pine is particularly prevalent on the property and has been the focus of some service projects by local scout troops.

Fauna

Similar to many areas in the Southern Piedmont region, several types of wildlife are particularly common. White-tailed deer are native to the region and are commonly spotted in and around the camp. Copperheads and cottonmouth snakes can occasionally be found in the area as well, but are well managed by the camp's nature lodge counselors and ranger staff.

=== Flint River Adventure Area ===
The Flint River Adventure Area was founded in 1988 as the Lawhorn Canoe & Training Center, it is the second major section of the scouting base as a whole. It was the first Scout high adventure base in the BSA's Southern Region and focused on canoe trips down the Flint River, ropes course and climbing programs, and mountaineering programs in north Georgia. When Thunder Scout Reservation was renamed in 2007, this camp was given the new FRAA title. The FRAA is located on the northwest corner of the Lawhorn Scouting Base.

Structures in the Flint River Adventure Area include the Grand Pavilion, SkyWalk COPE Course, Eagle Mountain Climbing Center, River Experience Center, and 9 campsites. In 2010, new construction included the completion of a Cub Scout Shooting Complex that includes BB ranges, pellet rifle ranges, and archery ranges. This complex is open, but not yet complete. The Rotary Club of Griffin is currently completing a renovation of the old ranger cabin to establish a new "Adventure Office and Health Center" with an estimated completion of February 2011.

In 2009, the adventure area's programs were re-written in an attempt to keep more programs on the property and limit the amount of transportation involved in activities. The caving and north Georgia programs were eliminated and replaced with a river trekking and backpacking expeditions. The camp ran 6 weeks of high adventure programs in 2010. For 2011, all the programs have been again rewritten, although the names remain the same. A new 10-day river and backpacking combination trek has been added (called the Muscogee SuperTrek).

=== Pine Mountain Backcountry ===
The Pine Mountain Backcountry, the third of the three major sections of the Lawhorn Scouting Base, consists of 2,000 acres and includes 16 campsites and 21-miles of trails. In 2013, the local Order of the Arrow lodge organized a Backcountry Development committee to revitalize campsites, trails, and increase promotion of the area. The majority of work has completed, though some projects are still ongoing.

== Order of the Arrow ==
Ini-To Lodge chartered in 1945 and still active. Name changed from Thundering Spring Lodge #324 in 1952.

- Coweta
- Echota
- Ronotohatchi
- Tussahaw

== See also ==
- Scouting in Georgia (U.S. state)
