= Scouting in Idaho =

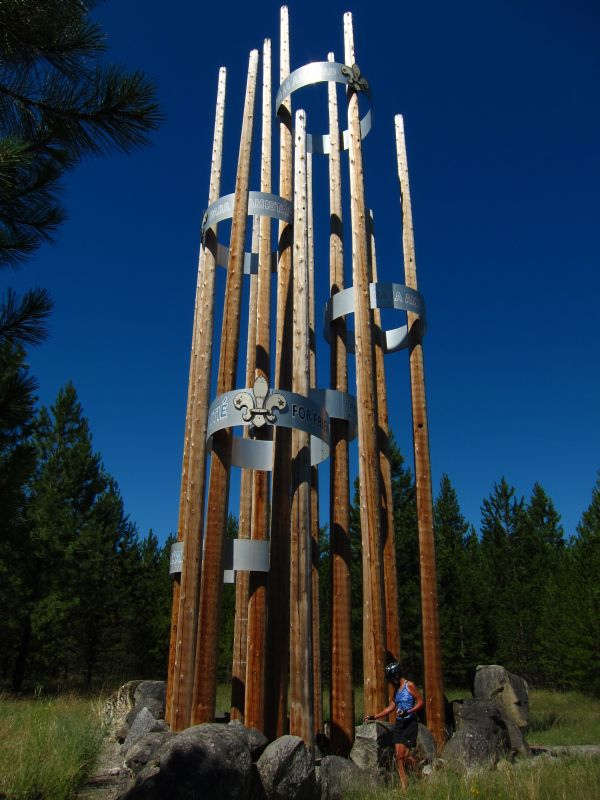
- "Friendship Poles" in Farragut Park

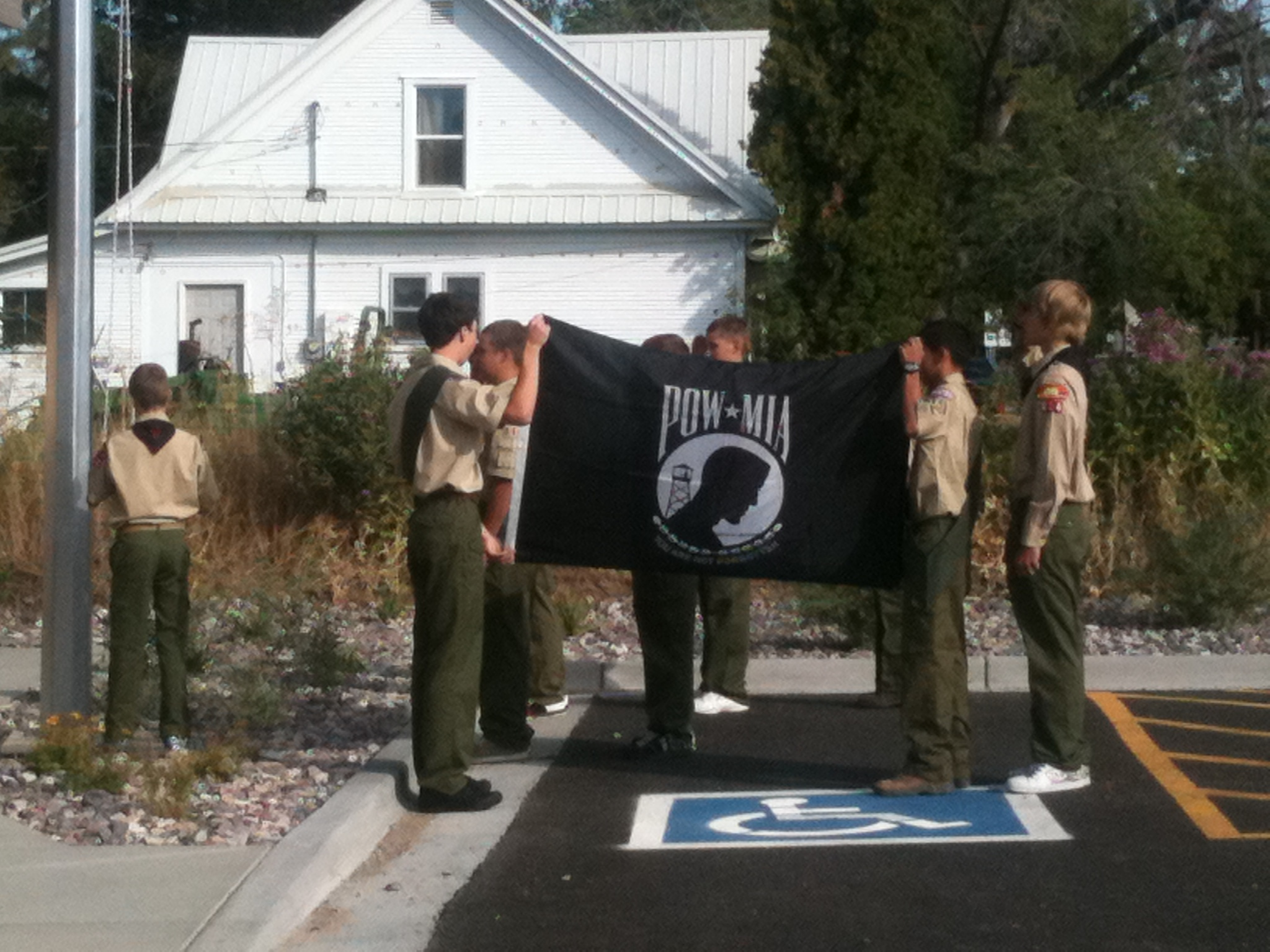
- McCammon Library Opening

Scouting in Idaho has a long history, from the 1910s to the present day, serving thousands of youth in programs that suit the environment in which they live.

== History ==
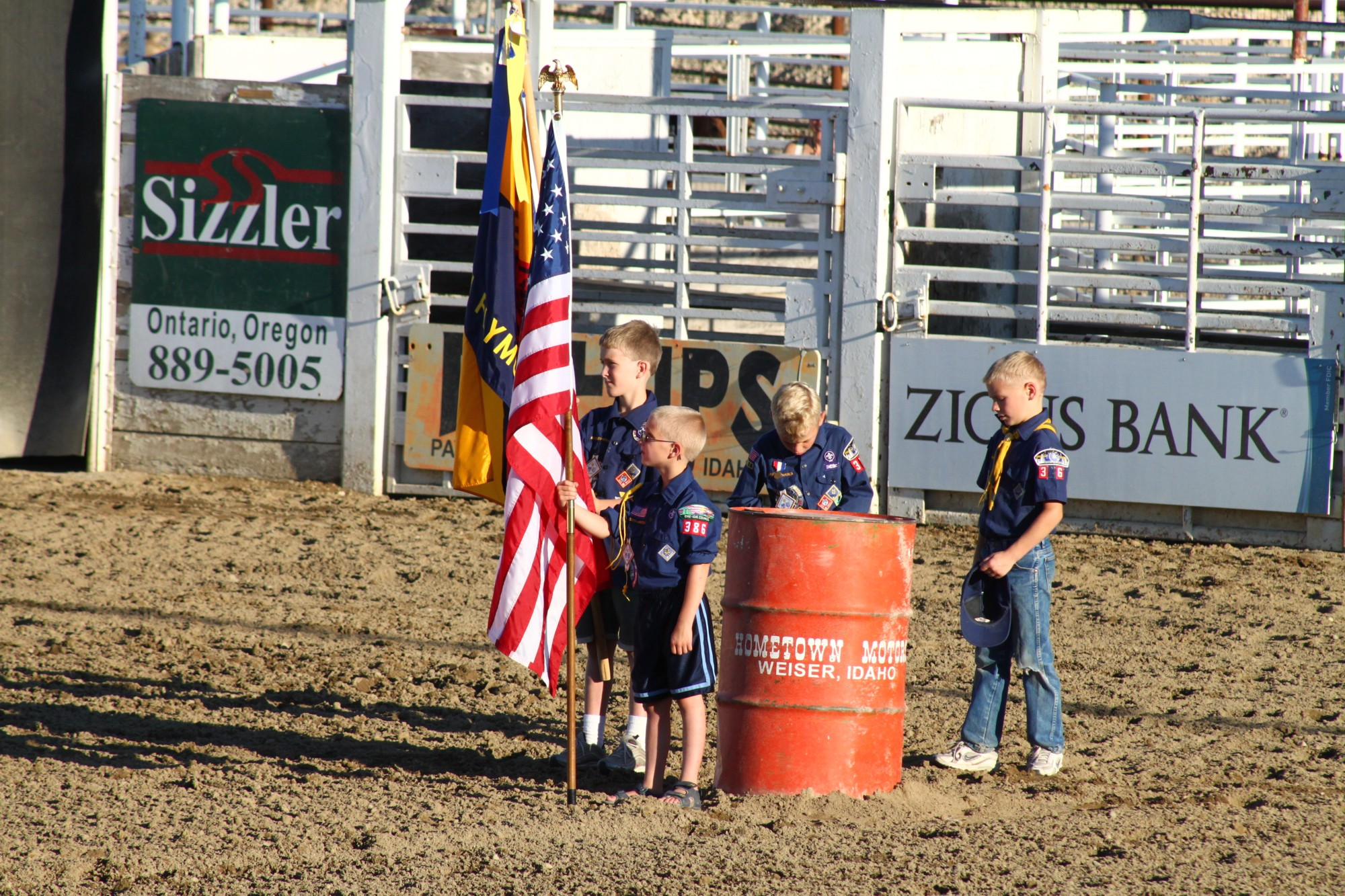
Cub Scouts at the Payette County Fair Kids Rodeo

The Ashton Council was founded in Ashton, Idaho in 1917. It closed in 1918.

The Rupert Council was founded in Rupert, Idaho in 1922. It closed in 1924.

The Boise Council (#105) was founded in 1919, and changed its name in 1927 to the Boise Area Council (#105). In 1951 the council changed its name to the Mountainview Council (#105). In 1968 the council merged with the Ore-Ida Council (#106).

The Western Idaho Council (#106) was founded in 1927, and changed its name in 1929 to the Oregon-Idaho Area Council (#106). In 1933 the council changed its name to the Ore-Ida Council (#106). On January 30, 2020 the council merged with Snake River Council (#111) and formed Mountain West Council.

The Bonner-Boundary Council (#106) merged with the Inland Northwest Council.

The Idaho Falls Council (#107) was founded in 1922, and changed its name in 1925 to the Teton Peaks Council (#107). In 1993, the council merged with the Tendoy Area Council (#109) to become Grand Teton Council (#107).

The Nez Perce County Council (#108) was founded in 1919 and changed its name in 1922 to the Lewiston Council (#108). It changed its name in 1925 to the Lewis-Clark Area Council (#108). In 1928 the council changed its name to the Lewis-Clark Council (#108). The council merged with the Inland Northwest Council (#611) in 1992.

The Pocatello Council (#109) was founded in 1919, and changed its name in 1925 to the Eastern Idaho Council (#109). It changed its name in 1934 to the Tendoy Area Council (#109). In 1993, the council merged with the Teton Peaks Council to become Grand Teton Council (#107).

The Shoshone County Council (#110) was founded in 1918, and changed its name in 1923 to the Shoshone-Kooteni Council (#110). In 1928 the council changed its name to the Idaho Panhandle Council (#110). The council merged with the Inland Northwest Council (#661) in 1992.

The Twin Falls Council (#111) was founded in 1922, and changed its name in 1924 to the Snake River Area Council (#111). It changed its name in 1993 to the Snake River Council (#111). On January 30, 2020 the council merged with Ore-Ida Council (#106) and formed Mountain West Council.

The Mountain West Council (#106) was formed in 2020, with the merging of Ore-Ida Council (#106) and Snake River Council (#111) on January 30, 2020.

== Scouting History ==
The 1969 National Scout Jamboree was held at Farragut State Park. Half of the 1973 National Scout Jamboree (Jamboree West) was held at the same location. The park hosted the 12th World Scout Jamboree in 1967.

International Girl Scout gatherings named Senior Roundups were held every three years from 1956 until 1965. The last one was held at Farragut Reservation, Idaho, from July 17 to July 26, 1965, with 12,000 girls in attendance.

== Boy Scouts of America in Idaho today ==
There are five Boy Scouts of America (BSA) local councils in Idaho.

=== Grand Teton Council ===
Grand Teton Council (#107)
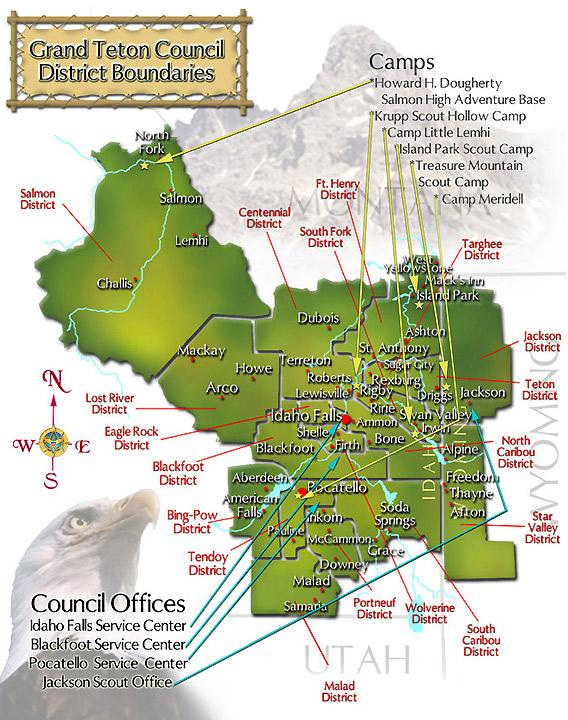
- Headquarters: Idaho Falls, Idaho
- Country: United States
- Website www.grandtetoncouncil.org

Grand Teton Council was formed as a result of a 1993 merger between Tendoy Area Council, headquartered in Pocatello, and Teton Peaks Council, headquartered in Idaho Falls. They serve over 22,000 Scouts and 12,000 leaders in eastern Idaho, western Wyoming, and southwestern Montana. Their main office is in Idaho Falls.

==== Organization ====
Districts

- BingPow District
- Blackfoot District
- Centennial District
- Eagle Rock District
- Jackson District (Wyoming)
- Lost River District
- Malad District
- North Caribou District
- Portneuf District
- Salmon District
- South Caribou District
- South Fork District
- Star Valley District (Wyoming)
- Tendoy District
- Teton District
- Wolverine District
- Yellowstone District

==== Camps ====
Grand Teton Council operates six camping properties; three Scout Camps, a whitewater High Adventure Base, and two Cub Scout/Webelos day camps.

==== Island Park Scout Camp ====
This camp, located east of the town of Last Chance in Fremont County, Idaho, was established in 1974. The camp grounds are completely owned by the Council. This camp usually operates for four to five weeks during the summer. It includes both a high and a low COPE (Challenging Outdoor Personal Experience) course. The aquatics program includes the only Sailboat program for the Council camps as it features a large lake. During the first week of August this camp is the home of the new Family Scouting Experience where programs are offered for all family members. Programs include Wood Badge, Powder Horn, Cedar Badge (NYLT), another non-Scouting programs for family members.

===== Little Lemhi Scout Camp =====
This camp was founded in 1959. It is located east of the town of Irwin, Idaho, across the South Fork of the Snake River. The summer camp program normally runs six weeks, in June and July.

===== Treasure Mountain Scout Camp =====
This camp's first season was 1936. It features beautiful views of the Grand Teton, Table Rock, and Big Medicine Falls. The camp is located in the town of Alta, Wyoming. The traditional summer camp season is normally 5 weeks long in June and July. The highly acclaimed "Cedar Badge" Junior Leader Training, which later adopted the BSA National Youth Leadership Training as its curriculum in 2005, is offered during the last two weeks of June at this camp. It is filled with springs as well; the two biggest ones being Blue Bear and Morning Glory. Blue Bear is 10 ft (3.0 m) deep, Morning Glory is 40 ft (12 m) deep.

===== Salmon River High Adventure Base =====
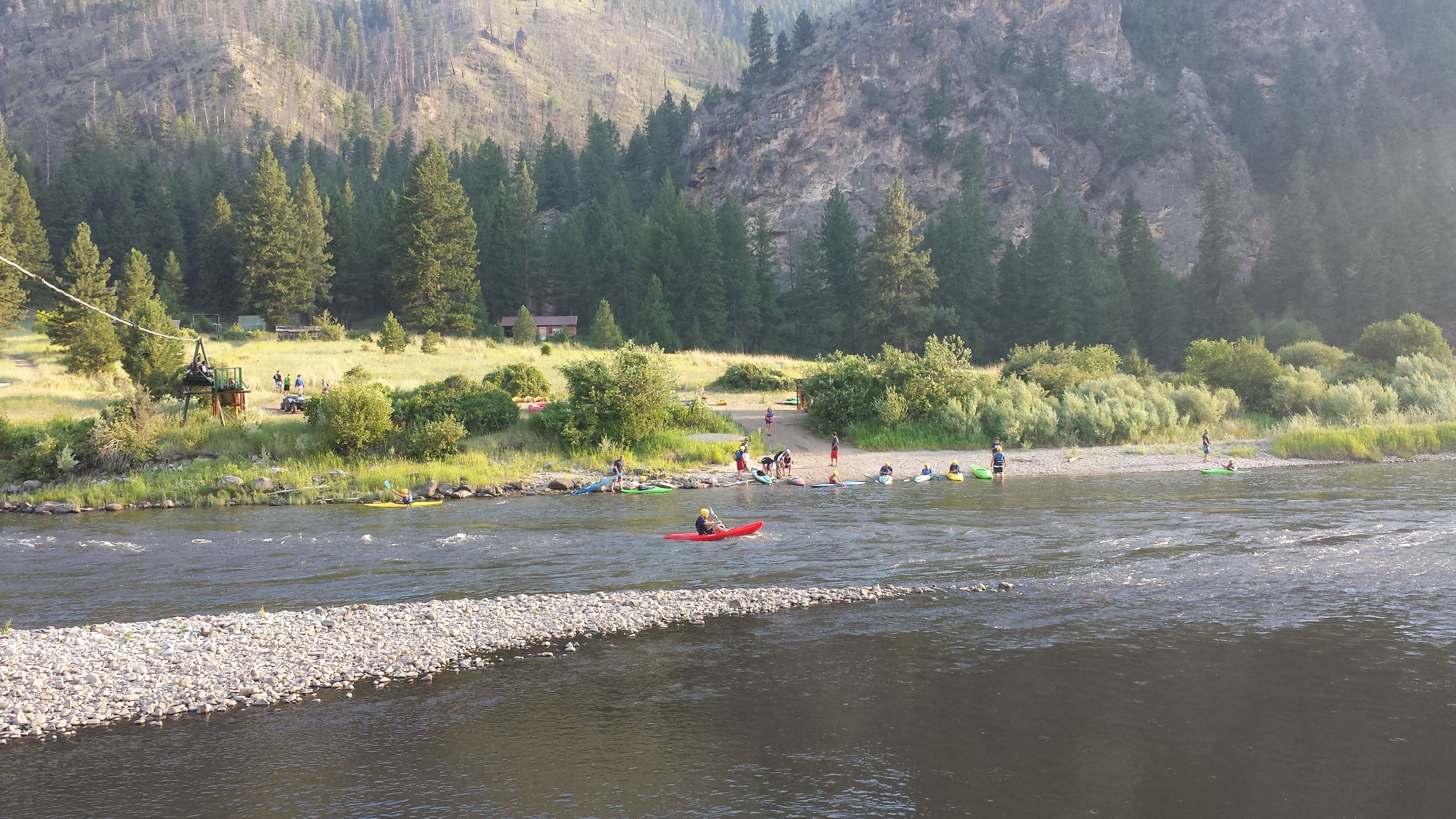
Salmon River High Adventure Base

In 1966, Teton Peaks Council started a whitewater kayaking program on the upper reaches of the Snake River. Within a few years, the program shifted to the Salmon River, operating out of the Spring Creek area. In 1986, the council acquired a permanent property for the base at Hale Gulch, approximately 13 miles downriver from North Fork, Idaho. This base, also known as SRHAB, is open in June and July, with 2.5 day sessions starting every Monday and Thursday. The primary program consists of rafting and whitewater kayaks. Secondary programs include low COPE, archery, climbing and rappelling, and frisbee gold. The base will celebrate two anniversaries in 2015, being the 30th anniversary of the current location and the 50th anniversary of the overall program.

===== Krupp Scout Hollow =====
This former 40-acre (160,000 m^{2}) farm and orchard was acquired in the 1980s for the purpose of Cub Scout activities. It is the home of a Cub Scout Day Camp (although traveling Day Camps are also sponsored across the service area). It includes a large frontier fort, an original Union Pacific caboose, bb gun range, and archery range. It is located in the town of LaBelle, Idaho. Wood Badge adult leadership training courses are held here with courses held during the summer and early autumn.

===== Portneuf Springs =====
This is the council's newest camp, serving the Cub Scouts with a day camp throughout the month of June. It is located west of Chubbuck, Idaho, off of I-86.

===== Order of the Arrow =====
Arrowmen in Grand Teton Council are covered by Shunkah Mahneetu Lodge 407. The name translates to "Gray Wolf," which is the lodge's totem. It was formed in 1994 from the merger of Navando-Ikeu and Ha-Wo-Wo-He-Qua-Nah.

=== Inland Northwest Council ===
Inland Northwest Council is headquartered in Spokane, Washington and serves Scouts in Washington and Idaho.

==== Order of the Arrow ====
Arrowmen in Inland Northwest Council are covered by Es-Kaielgu Lodge 611. The name translates to "Spotted Horse" which is the lodge's totem. It was formed in 1993 from the merger of Sel-Koo-Sho, Lemolloillahee and Wawookia Lodges.

==== Organization ====
Districts

- David Thompson District, Sandpoint
- Lewis-Clark District, Moscow
- Old Missions, Coeur d'Alene

=== Mountain West Council ===
Mountain West Council (#106)
- Headquarters: Boise, Idaho
- Country: United States
- Website www.mountainwestcouncil.org

Mountain West Council was created with the merger of Ore-Ida Council #106 and Snake River Council #111 in 2020. It serves Scouts in Idaho, Oregon, Nevada and Utah.

==== Organization ====
Districts

- Owyhee District
- Tapawingo District
- Snake River District

==== Camps ====
- Camp Morrison
- Camp Bradley
- Culimore High Adventure Camp
- Salmon River High Adventure Base

==== Organization ====
Districts

- Centennial District
- Gem State District
- Oregon Trail District
- Seven Rivers District

==== Camps ====
- Camp Morrison
- Culimore High Adventure Camp
- Salmon River High Adventure Base

==== Organization ====
Districts

- Cassia District
- Falls District
- Minidoka District
- Northside District
- Wood River District

==== Camps ====
- Camp Bradley
- Camp Murtaugh

==== Order of the Arrow ====
- The Ma-I-Shu lodge (363) of the Order of the Arrow serves the council.

== Girl Scouting in Idaho ==
Girl Scouting in Idaho
- Map of Girl Scout Councils in Idaho

Girls in Idaho are served by two councils.

=== Girl Scouts Eastern Washington and Northern Idaho ===
Girl Scouts Eastern Washington and Northern Idaho
- Headquarters: Spokane, Washington
- Country: United States
- Website gsewni.org

Girl Scouts Eastern Washington and Northern Idaho was formed on May 1, 2007, by the merger of Girl Scouts Mid – Columbia Council and Girl Scouts Inland Empire Council.

==== Service centers ====
- Sandpoint, Idaho
- Coeur d'Alene, Idaho
- Lewiston, Idaho

==== Camps ====
- Camp 4 Echos is 230 acres (0.93 km^{2}) on Lake Coeur d'Alene

=== Girl Scouts of Silver Sage ===
Girl Scouts of Silver Sage
- Headquarters: Boise, Idaho
- Country: United States
- Website girlscouts-ssc.org

Silver Sage serves 6,300 girls in southern Idaho, eastern Oregon, and northern Nevada.

==== Service centers ====
- Boise, Idaho
- Pocatello, Idaho
- Idaho Falls, Idaho

==== Camps ====
- Camp Alice Pittenger in McCall in Valley County, Idaho. It has 53 acres (210,000 m^{2}) on the shores of Payette Lake. It is named for a long term Girl Scout volunteer and donor of the land, Alice Pittenger.
- Pine Creek Ranch in Shoup in Lemhi County, Idaho. It has 161 acres (0.65 km^{2}).
- Camp Ta-Man-a-Wis in Swan Valley in Bonneville County, Idaho. It has 40 acres (160,000 m^{2}).
- Camp Elkhorn is 12 acres (49,000 m^{2}) in Baker in Baker County, Oregon.
- Friendship Square, a house in Boise, Idaho

== See also ==
- Eagle Rock (Idaho)
- Farragut State Park
- Scouting in British Columbia
