= Utah National Parks Council =

Former Boy Scouts of America council

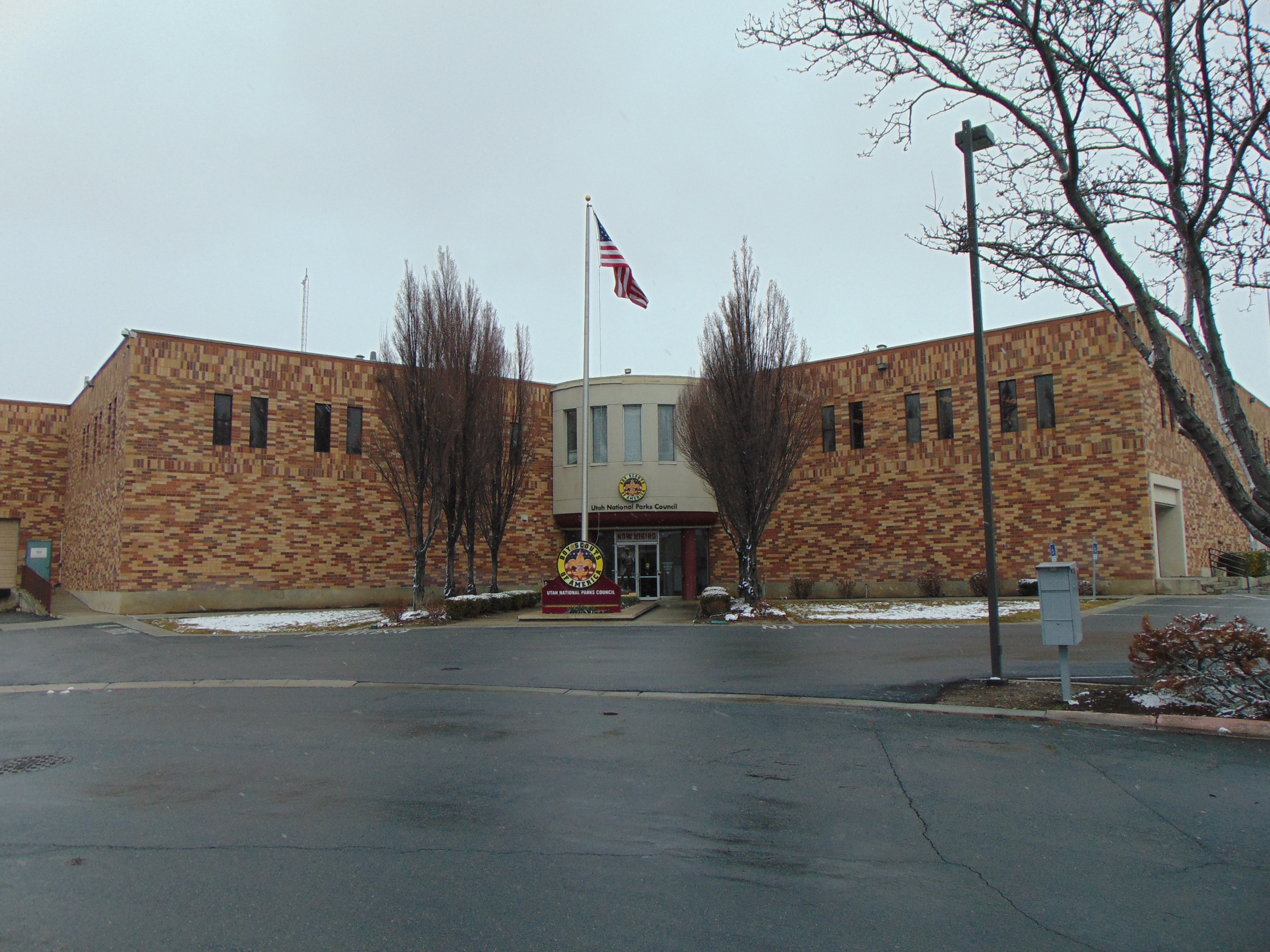
- Former headquarters of the Utah National Parks Council in Orem, Utah, February 2017
- Owner: Boy Scouts of America
- Headquarters: Orem, Utah
- Country: United States
- Defunct: April 2020
- Membership: Youth: 89,712; 26,510 Cub Scouts; 38,398 Boy/Varsity Scouts; 14,286 Venturers; 10,518 Learning for Life (includes Explorers): Adults 44,739; Units 6,299; (Dec 31, 2014)
- President: Mike Neider
- Council Commissioner: Richard DuBois
- Scout Executive: David Pack
- Website www.utahscouts.org

The Utah National Parks Council (UNPC) is a former local council of the Boy Scouts of America (BSA) that served youth in areas of Utah who live south of Salt Lake County and in some isolated areas of Nevada and Arizona. It was headquartered in Orem. As of December 31, 2013, UNPC was the largest of 242 local councils and is geographically within the Western Region of BSA. In 2011, the UNPC was recognized by the Utah Best of State Foundation as Utah's Best Humanitarian Organization. UNPC is a non-profit corporation governed by Scouting policies and a local community-based Executive Board. In April 2020, it combined with the former Great Salt Lake and Trapper Trails councils to create the new Crossroads of the West Council.

== History ==
In 1921, the Utah County Council (#591) was formed. In 1922 it changed its name to the Timpanagos Area Council (#591). In 1924, the Zion National Park Council (#670) was formed. In 1930 it merged with Timpanagos Area Council. In 1924, the Bryce Canyon Council (#671) was formed. In 1936 it merged with Timpanagos Area Council to become the Utah National Parks Council (#591).

In April 2020, Utah National Parks combined with the former Great Salt Lake and Trapper Trails councils to create the new Crossroads of the West Council.

== Organization ==
UNPC was organized into 21 geographic areas known as Districts, each delivering Scouting programs to their local communities: Alpine, Arapeen, Black Diamond, Bryce Canyon, Cathedral Gorge, Cedar Breaks, Great Basin, High Uintah, Hobble Creek, Iron Horse, Mount Nebo, Orem, Porter Rockwell, Provo Peak, San Juan, Snow Canyon, Tavaputs, Timpanogos, Wasatch and Zion District

== Camps ==
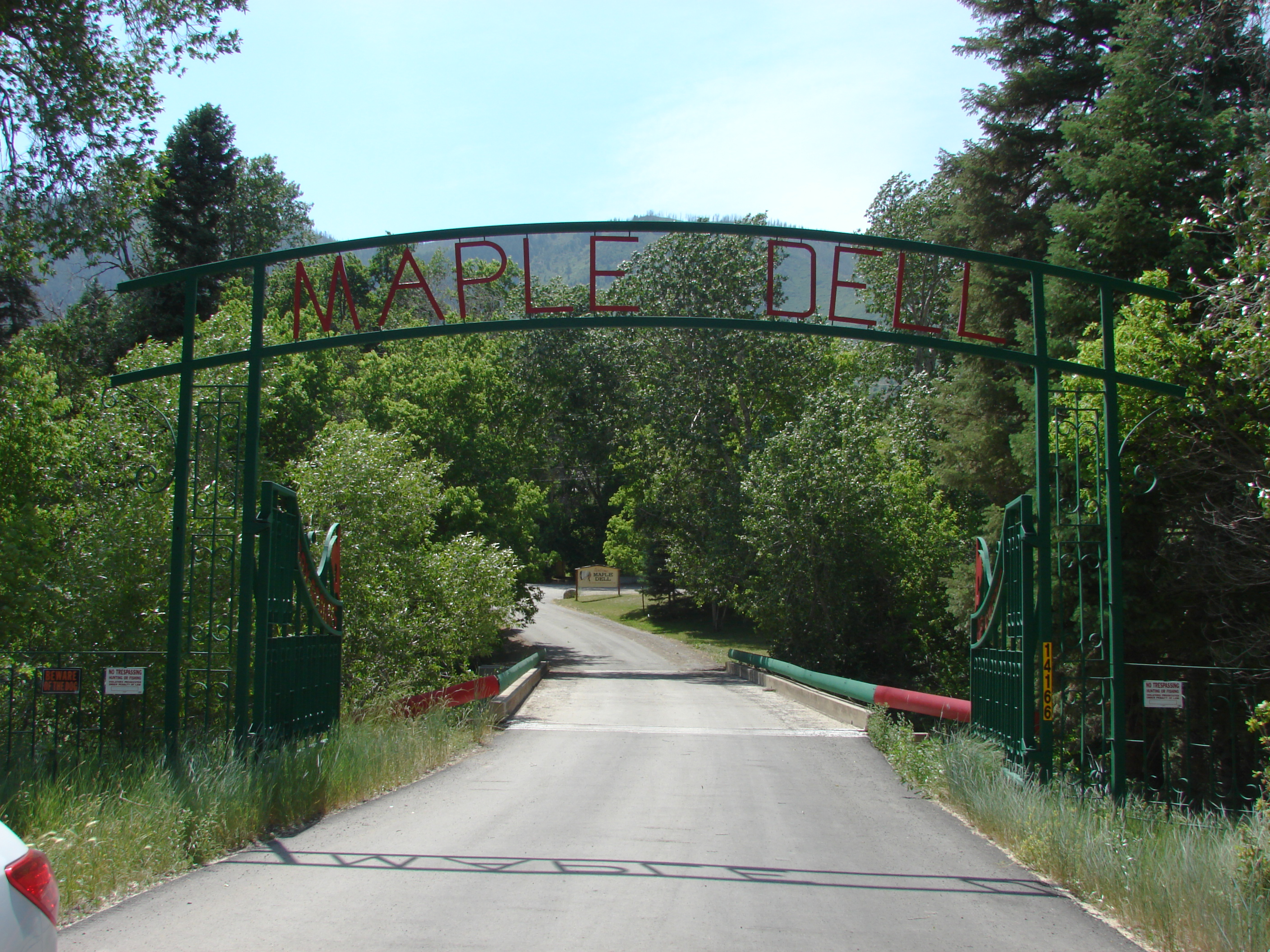
Entry gate for Camp Maple Dell in Payson Canyon, June 2015

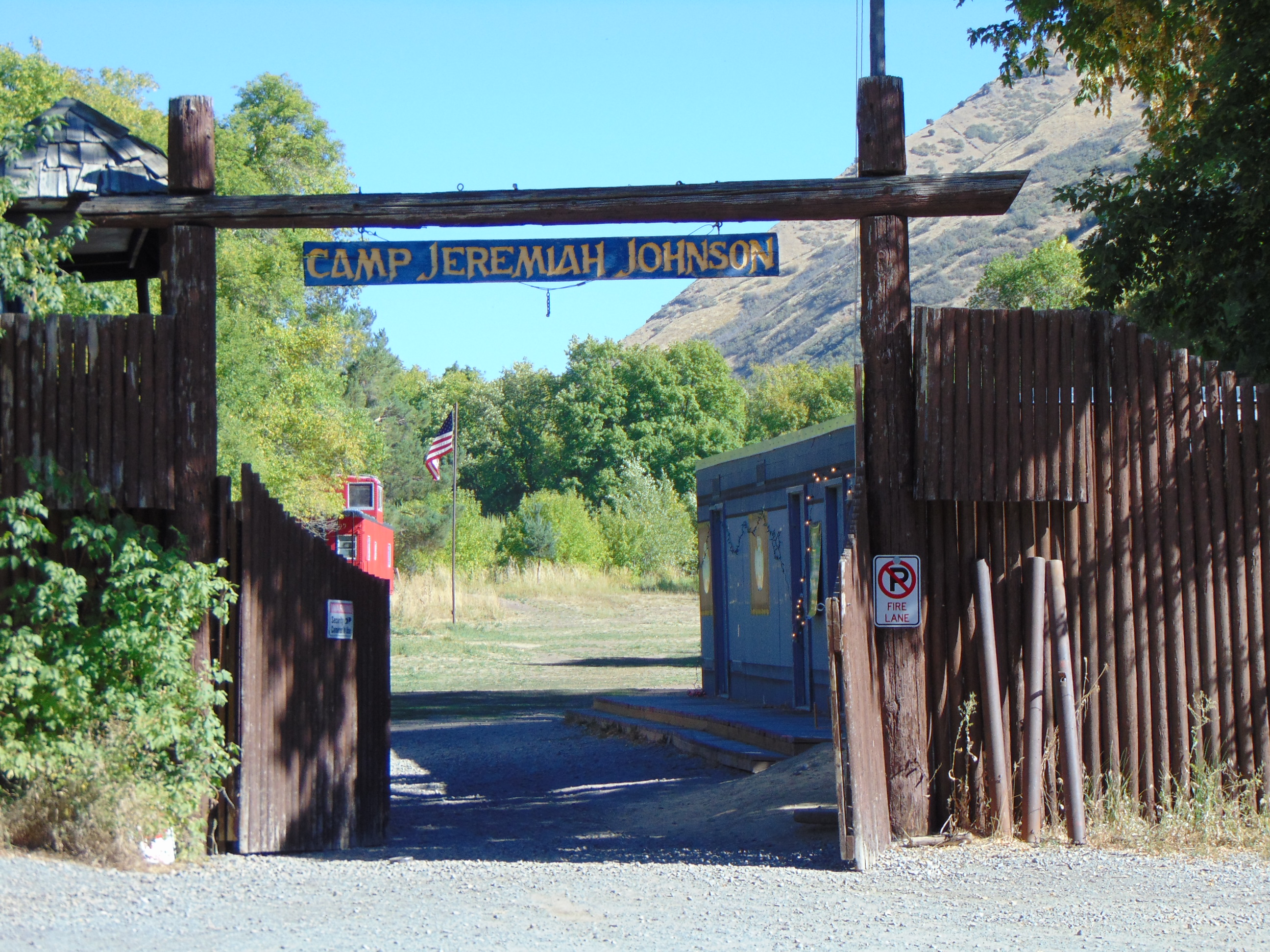
Entrance to Camp Jeremiah Johnson in Hobble Creek Canyon, June 2016

UNPC operated eleven Scout camps and two high adventure bases throughout central and southern Utah. They included Maple Dell, Tifie, Blue Mountain, High Uintah, Scofield, Camp Eagle Mountain, and Thunder Ridge Scout Camps. Camp Jeremiah Johnson (Cub Scout Day Camp) and Buck Hollow (Adventure Park for New [11 yr old] Scouts and Webelos [10 yr old] Wilderness Adventure) were camps dedicated to serving younger Scouts and Cubs. Moab Base Camp (Entrada) and Beaver High Adventure Bases served primarily Varsity Scout teams and Venturing crews.

UNPC also had Quail Creek Camp and Bacon Park Camp. These areas were used for unit and districts activities, family reunions, and council training courses.

UNPC offered structured youth, adult Scouter, and family in-residence training courses at several of its Scout Camps.

=== Wood Badge ===
The Wood Badge is the award given to those who complete the highest adult Scouter training course in Scouting. Courses are authorized by national BSA and are usually sponsored by a local council or region.

"It is the mark of men who have demonstrated that they are men of character who are devoted to a cause: men who strive for perfection well knowing that even the best is not enough; men that hold the welfare of others above self; Scouters who live up to all that name implies."

UNPC offered 14 Wood Badge for the 21st Century courses in 2011 and trained 376 adult Scouters in 2010.

=== Timberline National Youth Leadership Training ===
Timberline is what UNPC called its National Youth Leadership Training courses. In 2010, UNPC trained 889 youth in this course over 12 summer weeks in 39 separate courses.

=== Family camping ===
UNPC used to offer an annual Family Camp program at Camp Maple Dell which allowed a whole family to participate in the fun activities associated with a Scout camp as a family and without an advancement focus.

UNPC also offered a Family Odyssey program which is modeled after the Philmont Training Center experience at Tifie Scout Camp. This is a family program where a parent may attend Wood Badge, a Scout aged child may attend Timberline (NYLT), and the rest of the family may participate in age appropriate activities all at the same camp and all during the same week.

== Eagles Nest ==
UNPC had a nationally sanctioned National Eagle Scout Association committee which recognizes new Eagle Scouts as well as notable Eagle Scouts from the council. "Our council is the largest in the country, and we really have had the lead in Eagle Scout awards the last two years," said John Gaily, council program director. "We are by far the most." In 2010, UNPC recognized 2,818 new Eagle Scouts.

UNPC and NESA recognized notable Eagle Scouts with either the Outstanding Eagle Scout Award or the Distinguished Eagle Scout Award: Notable Eagle Scouts from UNPC include:

=== Distinguished Eagle Scouts ===
- Merrill D. Christopherson, Entrepreneur, Awarded 1984
- Dallin H. Oaks, Administrator, Awarded 1984
- Alan C. Ashton, Entrepreneur/Corporate Officer, Awarded 1993
- Jeffrey R. Holland, Educator, Awarded 2000
- Larry M. Gibson, Entrepreneur/Corporate Officer, Awarded 2005
- Wilson W. Sorensen, Educator, Awarded 2007
- Steven E. Snow, Administrator, Awarded 2011

== Tu-Cubin-Noonie Lodge ==
The Tu-Cubin-Noonie Lodge of the Order of the Arrow was established in the UNPC on May 24, 1954.

== See also ==
- Scouting in Utah
