= Thundering Spring =

Coordinates: 32°57′55.47″N 84°29′56.72″W

Thundering Spring is a spring near Albany, Georgia.

Thundering Spring was so named for the peculiar noises the spring produces.
