= Great Salt Lake Council =

Former council of the Boy Scouts of America in Utah, United States

Great Salt Lake Council, Boy Scouts of America
- Owner: Boy Scouts of America
- Headquarters: 525 Foothill Blvd Salt Lake City, UT 84113
- Country: United States
- Coordinates: 40°45′30.9″N 111°50′14.8″W
- Founded: December, 1918
- Defunct: April 2020

The Great Salt Lake Council was a local council of the BSA (BSA) which is now part of the Crossroads of the West Council. The Great Salt Lake Council served the Utah counties of Salt Lake, Tooele and Summit, as well as much of Davis County. In April 2020, it combined with the former Trapper Trails and Utah National Parks councils.

Prior to the Church of Jesus Christ of Latter-day Saints ending its relationships with the BSA, it was the organization's second largest council.

== History ==
In 1916, the Salt Lake City Council (#590) was formed. It changed its name to the Salt Lake and South Davis Counties Council (#590) in 1926, changing it again in 1926 to Salt Lake City Area Council(#590). In 1951 it changed its name to Great Salt Lake Council (#590).

In April 2020, it combined with the former Utah National Parks and Trapper Trails councils to create the new Crossroads of the West Council.

== Organization ==
The council was divided into 22 districts.

== Camps ==
The council operated the following camps:

- Camp Steiner
- Hinckley Scout Ranch - East Fork Scout Camp, Ridgeline High Adventure, Camp Sunrise Girls Camp
- Millcreek Canyon - Camp Tracy, Cub Country, Camp Traci Girls Camp
- Bear Lake Aquatics Base
- Teton High Adventure Base

== Girls at Camp ==
For years before the BSA allowed younger girls in the program the Millcreek Canyon Camps allowed girls to attend camp to enjoy Millcreek Canyon. For girls ages 8 to 9 years-old, they may attend Cub Country camps. And for girls ages 10 to 11 years-old, they may attend Camp Traci for Girls. Girls over the age of 11 were able to attend Camp Sunrise at Hinckley Scout Ranch.

== El-Ku-Ta Lodge ==
The first Ordeal for the El-Ku-Ta Lodge of the Order of the Arrow was held at Camp Steiner in June 1956. The ceremony team that conducted the ceremony could have either been from the Ogden area or from the Tannu Lodge in Reno, Nevada, or the ceremony was possibly conducted by the Steiner camp staff themselves. Induction weekends were typically held at the Tooele Wigwam or at Frontier Fort in Millcreek Canyon up until the dissolving of the lodge in 2020.

== See also ==
- Scouting in Utah
- Operation On-Target
