= Trapper Trails Council =

Council of the Boy Scouts of America

- Owner: Boy Scouts of America
- Headquarters: 1200 E 5400 S Ogden, UT 84403
- Country: United States
- Coordinates: 41.165121°N 111.949539°W
- Defunct: April 2020
- Website https://www.trappertrails.org/

The Trapper Trails Council is a former local council of the Boy Scouts of America that served areas in Northern Utah, Southern Idaho and Western Wyoming serving 18 districts. In April 2020, it combined with the former Great Salt Lake and Utah National Parks councils to create the new Crossroads of the West Council.

== History ==
In 1916, the Logan Council (#588) was formed. It changed its name to the Cache Valley Council (#588) in 1922, changing it again in 1924 to Cache Valley Area Council (#588). In 1919, the Ogden Council (#589) was formed. It changed its name to the Ogden Gateway Area Council (#589) in 1922, changing it again in 1934 to Ogden Area Council (#589). In 1951, the Ogden Area Council changed its name Lake Bonneville Council (#589). Lake Bonneville and Cache Valley Area merged with the Jim Bridger Council (#639) to form the Trapper Trails Council in 1993.

In April 2020, it combined with the former Great Salt Lake and Utah National Parks councils to create the new Crossroads of the West Council.

== Organization ==
The council was divided into these districts:

- Arrowhead
- Bear Lake
- Bird Haven
- Bonneville Shores
- Elk Horn
- Francis Peak
- Franklin
- Golden Spike
- Island View
- Jim Bridger
- Lakeview
- Mount Ogden
- Mountain View
- Old Ephraim
- Old Juniper
- Snow Horse
- Weber View
- Wyoming Trails

== Camps ==
Trapper Trails Council hires over 500 camp counselors annually to serve as handicraft assistants, sports instructors, shooting sports assistants (archery, .22 caliber rifle, BB gun, skeet and black-powder), trading post operators/managers, maintenance and food service assistants, nature instructors and Scout skills instructors, and lifeguards. The council operates the following camps:

- Camp Bartlett is located at southeastern Idaho 4 miles (6.4 km) up the road from Cache National Forest
- Camp Browning is located in Huntsville, Utah, about 67.12 miles (108.02 km) from Salt Lake City.
- Camp Fife is located on the Bear River near Cutler Dam, just outside Fielding, Utah
- Hull Valley Scout Reservation is located near Preston, Idaho.
- Camp Hunt is located on Bear Lake near Garden City.
- Camp Kiesel is located about 25 miles (40 km) east of Ogden, Utah.
- Camp Loll is located on Lake of the Woods in Wyoming near Grand Teton National Park and Yellowstone National Park.
- Camp New Fork is located on the lower New Fork lake just outside Cora, Wyoming.
- Traveling Day Camp
- Ogden COPE Course

== See also ==
- Scouting in Utah
