= Kima =

Kima may refer to:

== People ==
- Kenny Kima Beyissa (born 2003), Central African footballer
- Kima Greggs, fictional character from the television show The Wire
- Kima Jones (born 1982), American writer, poet and literary publicist
- Kima Raynor, R&B artist from the group Total
- Sairuat Kima (born 1997), Indian footballer

== Places ==
- Bhaini Kima, village in Punjab, India
- Kia Kima Scout Reservation, summer camp outside Hardy, Arkansas
- Kima Rumi, mountain in the Cordillera Blanca in the Andes of Peru
- Kima Rumi (Lima-Junín), mountain range in the Cordillera Central in the Andes of Peru
- Kima Tullpa, mountain in the Cordillera Negra in the Andes of Peru
- Old Kia Kima, restored Boy Scout summer camp in Arkansas

== Other uses ==
- Kima (spider), a genus of spiders
- KIMA-TV, television station in Yakima, Washington, United States
- KIMA Aswan SC, Egyptian football club
- Trofeo Kima, international skyrunning competition
- Saltsa kima, Greek spaghetti topping

== See also ==
- Kimah, village in Horns, Syria
