= Kema =

Kema or KEMA may refer to:

- KEMA, an energy consultancy company
- Kema (river), a river in Russia
- Kema District, a district in North Sulawesi, Indonesia
- Kema Chikwe, Nigerian politician
- Kema Jack (born 1982), footballer from Papua New Guinea

== See also ==
- Kemah (disambiguation)
- Keema
- Kima (disambiguation)
