= Scouting in Tennessee =

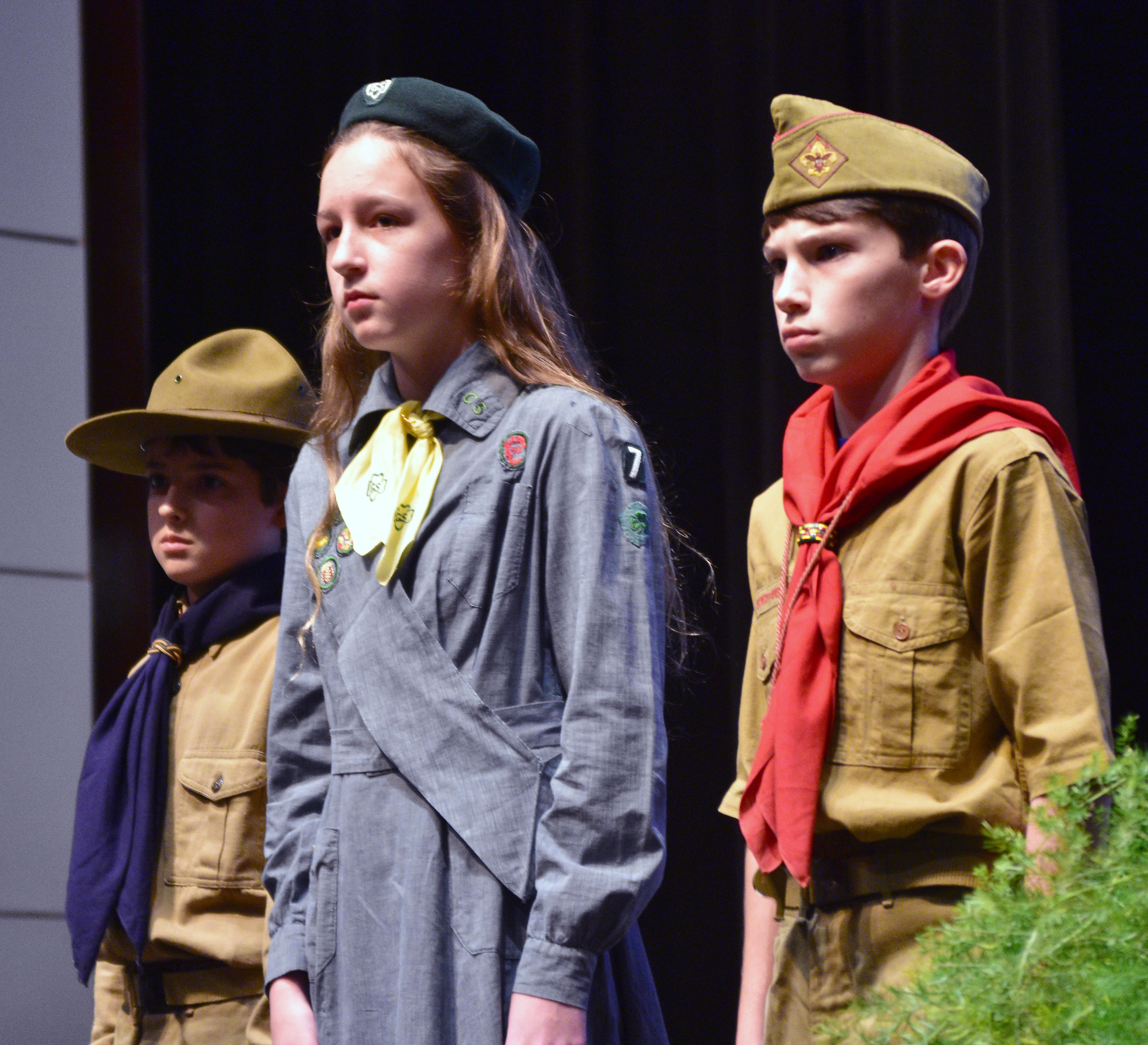
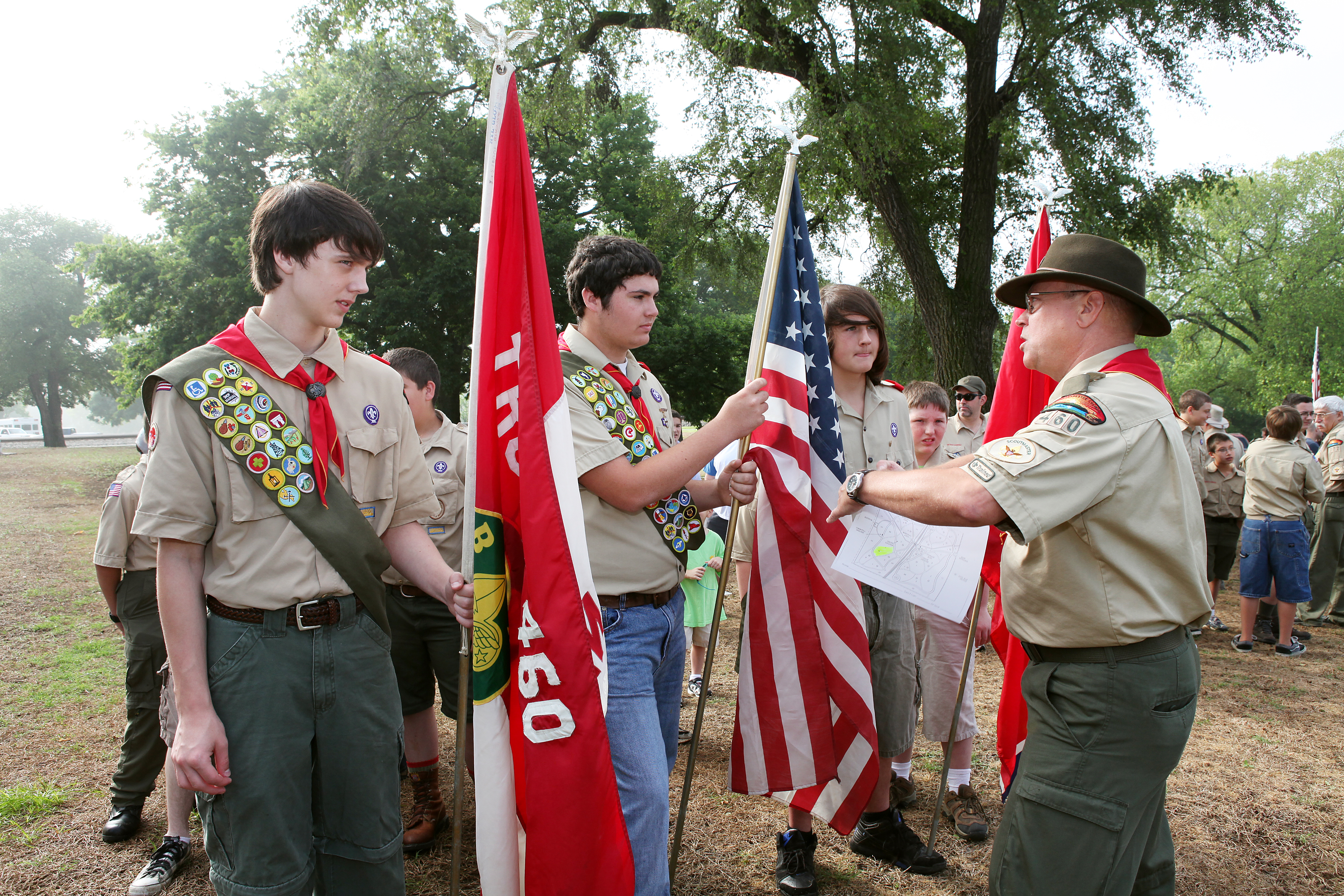
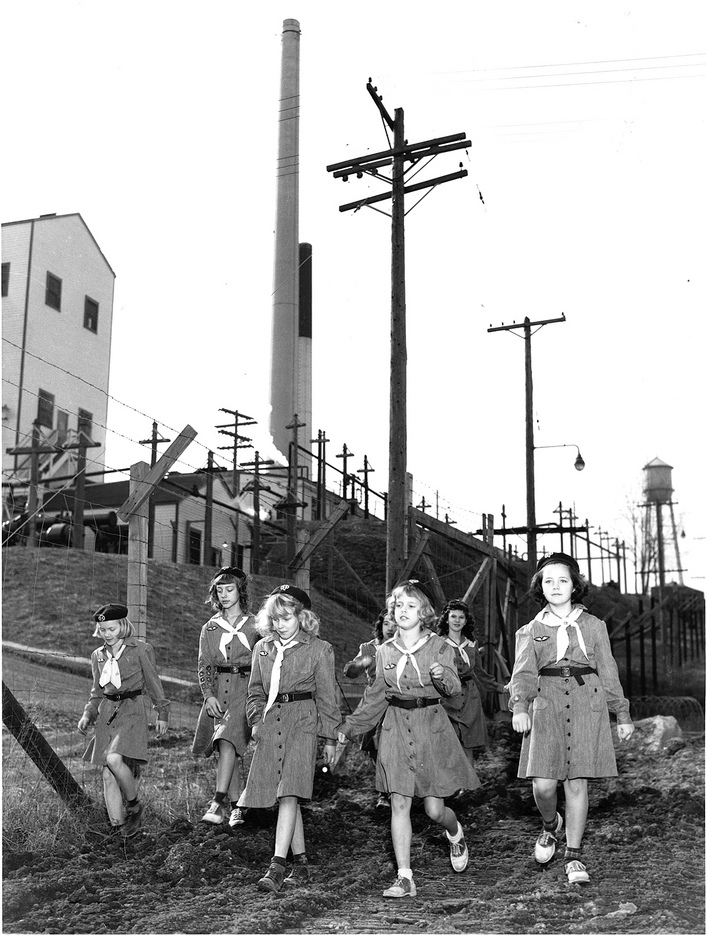
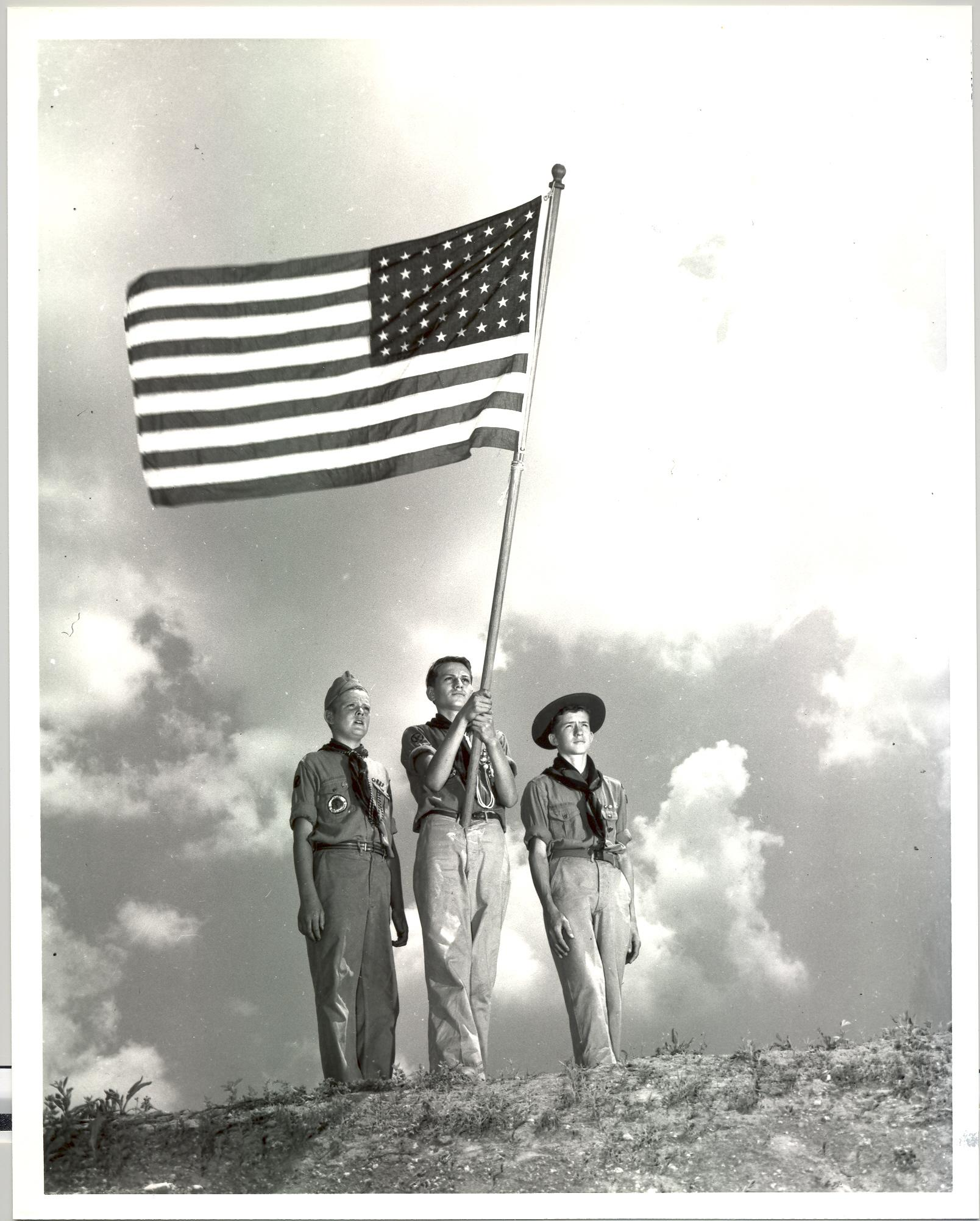
- Boy & Girl Scouts Oak Ridge High School 2015 Boy scouts Place Flags at Tennessee National Memorial Cemetery A girl scout troop visits the X-10 Graphite Reactor in 1951 Oak Ridge

Scouting in Tennessee has a long history, from the 1910s to the present day, serving thousands of youth in programs that suit the environment.

== Early history (1910–1950) ==
The boy scouts were chartered in Tennessee in 1910. Until 1974, some Tennessee councils of the Boy Scouts of America were racially segregated. (The Old Hickory council did not integrate until 1974.) Colored Troops, as they were officially known, were given little support from some Districts and Councils. Some Scouting executives and leaders believed that Colored Scouts and Leaders would be less able to live up to the ideals of the Boy Scouts.

In 1917 the first girl scout troops in Nashville and elsewhere in Tennessee began meeting. In 1922 Knox County received a charter. In 1926 the Nashville Girl Scout Council was chartered. Most Girl Scouts of the USA units were originally segregated by race according to state and local laws and customs. In 1924, Josephine Groves then working at a shelter for African-American mothers and families in need in Nashville heard about Girl Scouting and attended a training course for leaders. She brought scouting back to the girls at the shelter; however, none of this was official since both she and they were African-American. She married, becoming Josephine Groves Holloway, and left her job at the shelter but continue to encourage scouting. In 1933 she requested recognition for her troop from the local council; it was refused until 1942 when permission for the first official African-American Girl Scout troop in Tennessee was given. She also help fully desegregate the Cumberland Valley council in 1962.

== Scouting America in Tennessee today ==
There are seven Scouting America councils in Tennessee.

=== Cherokee Area Council ===
Cherokee Area Council (#556)
- Owner: Scouting America
- Headquarters: Chattanooga, Tennessee
- Country: United States
- Founded: 1910
- Scout Executive: Scott Fosse
- Website www.cherokeeareabsa.com

The Cherokee Area Council serves Scouts in Tennessee and Georgia, with the council office located in Chattanooga, Tennessee and The council is divided into four districts. Active from 1914, programs offered include: Cub Scouts, Scouts BSA, Venturing, and Learning for Life. The council's Skymont Scout Reservation provides year-round and summer camping opportunities on the Cumberland Plateau.

==== Council camp ====
Skymont Scout Reservation, which consists of over 2,400 acres (9.7 km^{2}) on the edge of the Cumberland Mountains Plateau, hosts Scouts BSA summer camps, Cub Scout family camps and high adventure activities throughout the summer and other camps during the year. It is also home of the Talidandaganu' Lodge of the Order of the Arrow.

=== Chickasaw Council ===
Chickasaw Council (#558)
- Owner: Scouting America
- Headquarters: Memphis, Tennessee
- Country: United States
- Founded: February 22, 1916
- Scout Executive/CEO: Casey Norwood
- Program Director: Haley Baird
- Website www.chickasaw.org

The Chickasaw Council serves Scouts in the Memphis metropolitan area, including all of Shelby County (Tennessee) and Crittenden County (Arkansas), as well as fifteen counties in the Mississippi Delta, including districts that were merged from the Delta Area Council in 1993.

==== Council camps ====
Kia Kima Scout Reservation, near Hardy, Arkansas on the South Fork Spring River, was founded in 1916 by Memphis philanthropist Bolton Smith. The reservation, which hosts Chickasaw Council summer camps, is split into three properties: Camp Osage, Camp Cherokee and the Ozark Venture Base. The original Kia Kima facilities (pre-1963) have been restored and maintained as Old Kia Kima by a separate non-profit group.

Camp Currier, Eudora, Mississippi, near Memphis, was founded in 1925 to host weekend camping and training events throughout the year. (The more remote Kia Kima operated only during the summer for most of its history.)

=== Great Smoky Mountain Council ===
Great Smoky Mountain Council (#556)
- Owner: Scouting America
- Headquarters: Knoxville, Tennessee
- Country: United States
- Founded: 1915
- Scout Executive: David Williams
- Program Director: Mic Mullins
- Website easttnscouts.org

The Great Smoky Mountain Council serves 21 East Tennessee counties and is headquartered in Knoxville, Tennessee.

==== Organization ====
The council is divided in to 6 districts.

- Cades Cove District
- Cataloochee District
- Eagle Creek District
- Mount Cammerer District
- Mount Le Conte District
- Tremont District (STEM Scouts)

==== Council camps ====
The council operates two camps, Camp Buck Toms and Camp Pellissippi. Camp Buck Toms is the primary camp of the council and is located in Rockwood, Tennessee on the shores of Watts Bar Lake. Camp Buck Toms operates as the council's summer camp property. Camp Pellissippi is located in Andersonville, Tennessee on Norris Lake, and formerly served as the council's summer camp until 1977.

=== Middle Tennessee Council ===
The Middle Tennessee Council serves 37 Middle Tennessee counties, and is headquartered in Nashville, Tennessee.

=== Sequoyah Council ===
Sequoyah Council
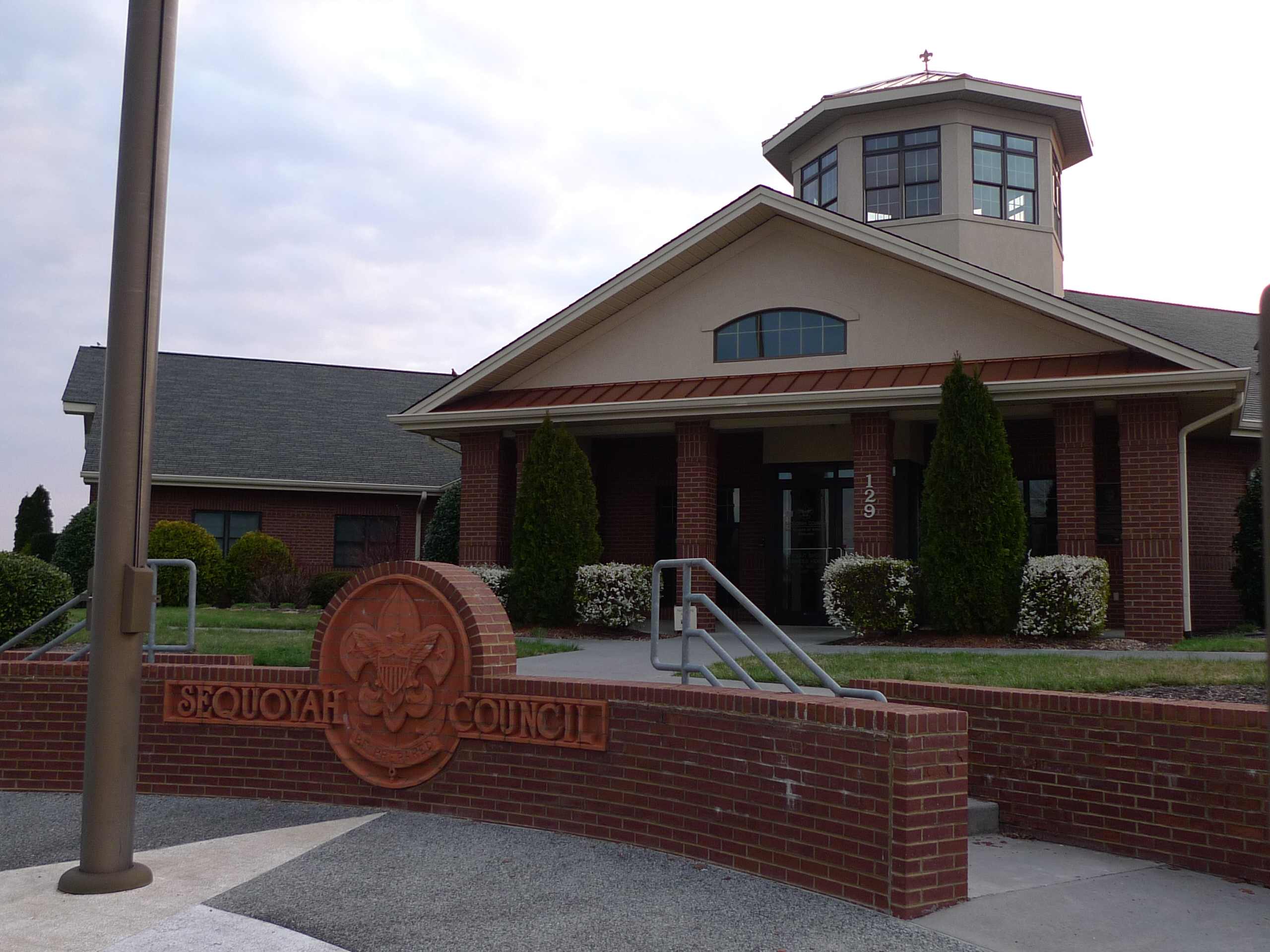
- Council office in Johnson City
- Owner: Scouting America
- Country: United States

The Sequoyah Council serves Scouts in Northeast Tennessee and Virginia.

==== Organization ====
- Breaks District
- Buffalo Mountain District
- Nolachuckey District
- Overmountain District
- Wilderness Road District

==== Council camp ====
Camp Davy Crockett, near Rogersville, Tennessee, was founded in 1972.

=== Lincoln Heritage Council ===
The Four Rivers District of the Louisville, Kentucky-based Lincoln Heritage Council includes BSA units in South Fulton, Tennessee, located on the state border across from Fulton, Kentucky.

=== West Tennessee Area Council ===
Headquartered in Jackson, the West Tennessee Area Council (WTAC) serves Scouts in all Tennessee counties west of the Tennessee River except for Shelby County (Chickasaw Council).

- Western District
- Central District
- Tennessee River District

==== Council camp ====
Camp Mack Morris in Camden, Tennessee serves as the primary camping facility for the WTAC and has been in continuous operation since 1946. It is also the home of Ittawamba Lodge 235 of the Order of the Arrow.

== Girl Scouting in Tennessee today ==
Girl Scouting in Tennessee today
- Girl Scouts of the USA council map with service centers and camps for the state of Tennessee
- Country: United States

There are four Girl Scout councils serving Tennessee.

=== Girl Scouts of Greater Atlanta ===
Girl Scouts of Greater Atlanta serves girls in Polk County, Tennessee.

Headquarters: Atlanta, Georgia

=== Girl Scouts Heart of the South ===
Girl Scouts Heart of the South was established on June 1, 2008, by the merger of Girl Scouts of Northeast Mississippi, Girl Scout Council of Northwest Mississippi, Girl Scout Council of The Mid-South, and Reelfoot Girl Scout Council. It serves 6,000 girls and has 2,000 adult volunteers in west Tennessee, north Mississippi and Crittenden County, Arkansas.

Headquarters: Memphis, Tennessee

Camps:

- Kamp Kiwani is 1,250 acres (510 ha) including a 70-acre (28 ha) lake in Middleton, Tennessee
- Camp Tik-A-Witha is 310 acres (130 ha) with a 20 acres (8.1 ha) lake in Van Vleet, Chickasaw County, Mississippi next to the Tombigbee National Forest.
- Camp Fisherville is 72 acres (29 ha) in Fisherville, Tennessee
- Girl Scout Program/Training Center in Memphis, Tennessee

=== Girl Scouts of Middle Tennessee ===
Girl Scouts of Middle Tennessee serves over 14,000 girls and has 7,000 adult volunteers in 39 Tennessee counties. Nashville had its first troop in 1917 and Nashville Girl Scout Council was chartered in 1926. In 1958 a reorganization led to Cumberland Valley Girl Scout Council covering 20 counties in Tennessee and southern Kentucky. In 2006 a new realignment led to the current larger council.

Headquarters: Nashville, Tennessee

Camps:

- Camp Holloway is 76 acres (31 ha) in Millersville, Tennessee, and established in 1951 as a camp for "Negro girl scouts"; it now serves all girls. It is named for Josephine Holloway who founded the first official African-American Girl Scout troop in Nashville in 1942 (some 18 years after establishing one unofficially and 9 years after first seeking official permission).
- Camp Nee Kah Nah is 354 acres (143 ha) in Gainesboro, Tennessee. Its name derives from "friendship crossing" in Cherokee.
- Camp Piedmont is 29 acres (12 ha) in Murfreesboro, Tennessee. (sold in 2024)
- Camp Sycamore Hills is 742 acres (300 ha) in Ashland City, Tennessee. It was established in 1959.

Founded in 2017, Girl Scouts of Middle Tennessee Troop 6000 serves scouts at homeless shelters across Middle Tennessee.

=== Girl Scout Council of the Southern Appalachians (GSCSA) ===
Formed by the merger of Girl Scouts of the Appalachian Council, Girl Scouts of Tanasi Council, and Girl Scouts of Moccasin Bend Council. This council covers 46 counties in southwest Virginia, east Tennessee, and north Georgia and has service centers in Johnson City, Tennessee, Knoxville, and Chattanooga.

Camps:

- Camp Wildwood in Johnson City, Tennessee is 12 acres (4.9 ha) owned by the Harris Foundation but for the use of the Girl Scouts.
- Camp Tanasi covers 461 acres (187 ha) on Norris Lake near Andersonville
- Camp Adahi covers 900 acres (360 ha) on Lookout Mountain in Georgia and includes 10 acres (4.0 ha) lake. It was acquired in 1965.

Former camps:

- Camp Sky-Wa-Mo in Bluff City, Tennessee. Put on the market in September 2012.
- Camp Windy Knob in Greenville, Tennessee
- Warren-Kelly Memorial Center for Girls("The Hut") in Big Stone Gap, Virginia

== Museums ==
- The Girl Scout Museum at Daisy's Place, Girl Scout Council of the Southern Appalachians Office in Knoxville
- Peregrine International Museum of Scouting

== See also ==
- Big Cypress Tree State Park
