= Kia Kima Scout Reservation =

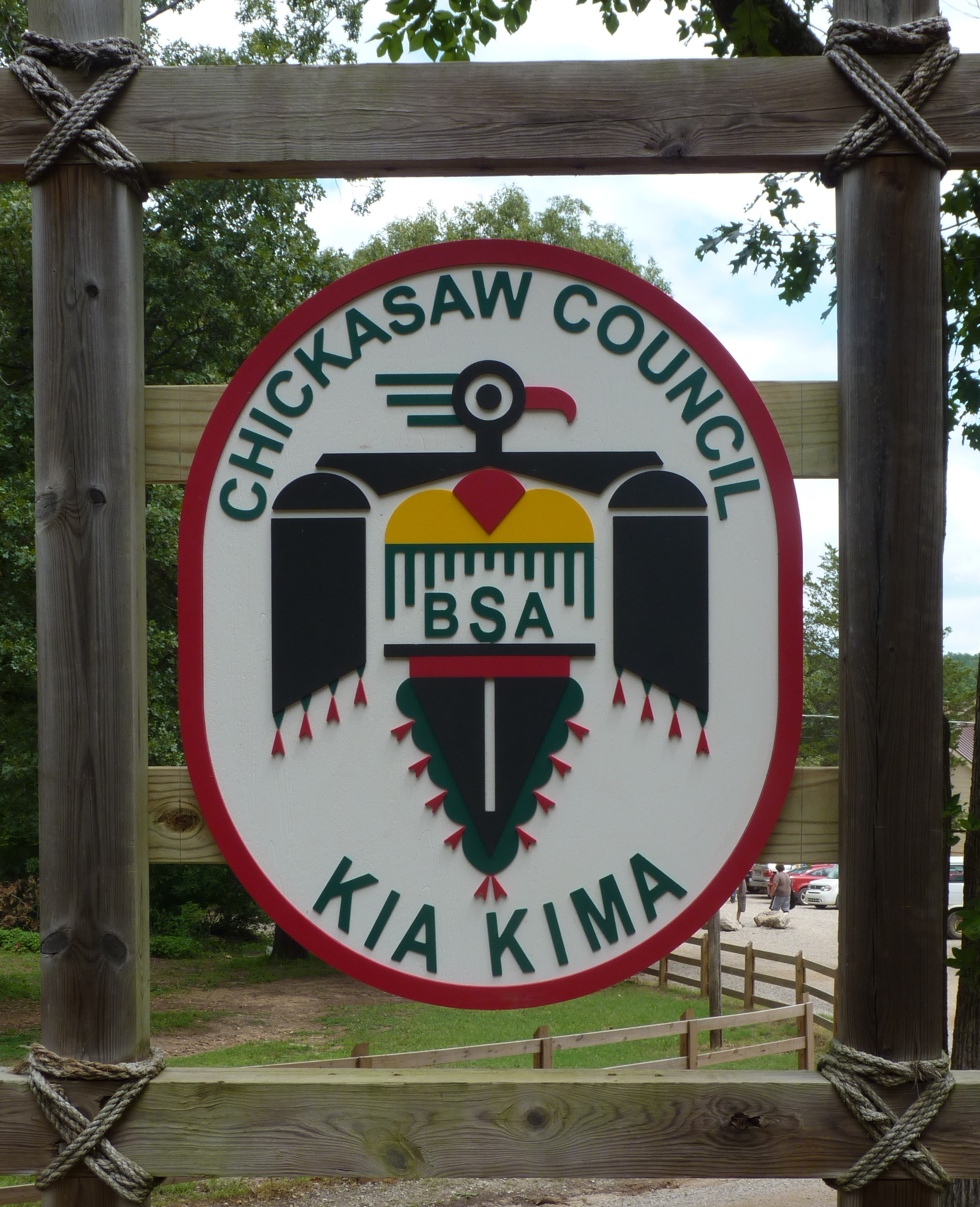

- Kia Kima Scout Reservation (Arkansas)
- Name Translation: Nest of Eagles
- Totem: Thunderbird
- Owner: Chickasaw Council
- Location: Hardy, AR
- Coordinates: 36.34455°N 91.59223°W
- Founded: April 11, 1916 (110 years, 3 months and 17 days ago)
- Founder: Bolton Smith
- Website www.kiakima.net

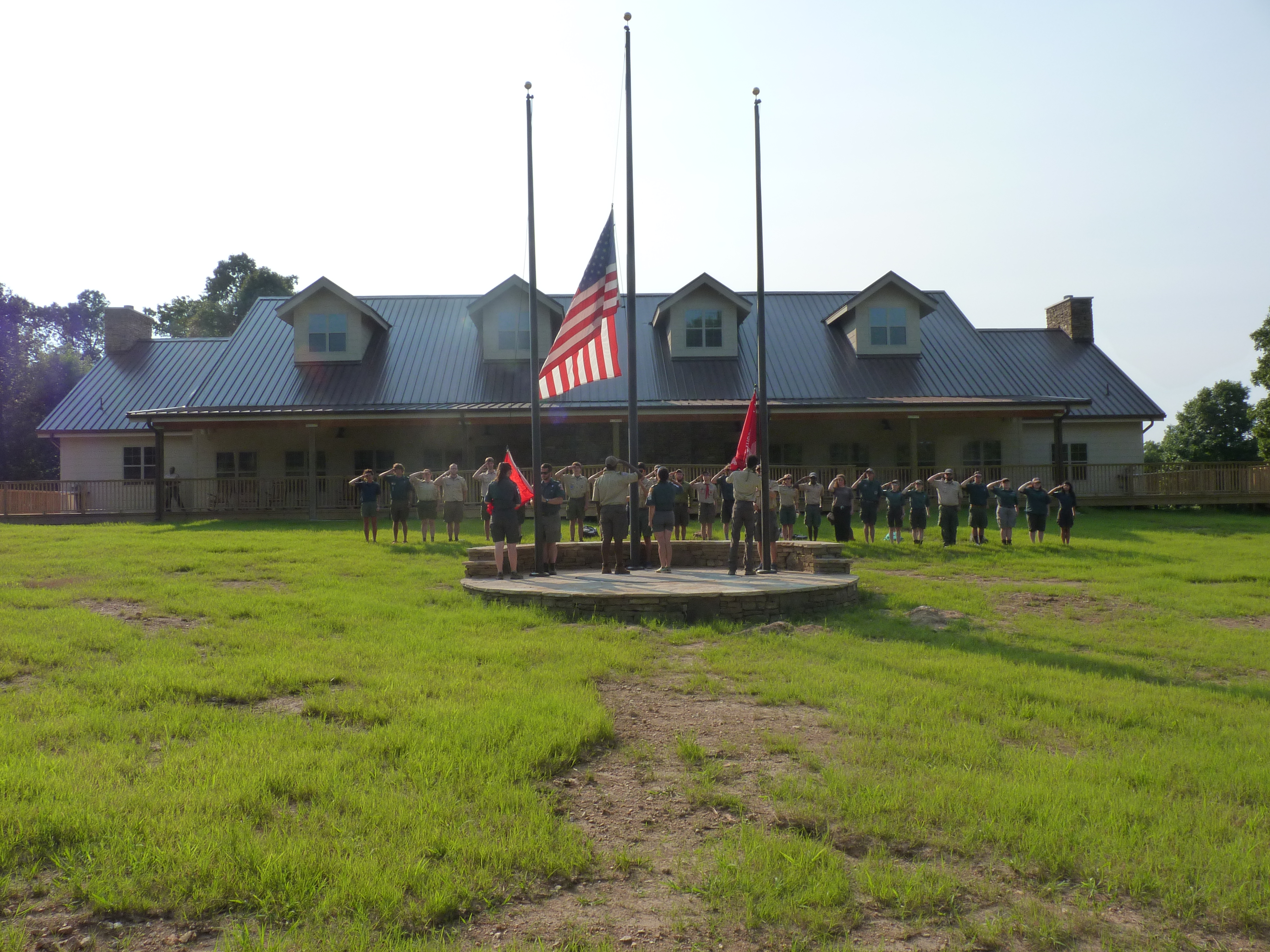
Flag ceremony in Camp Osage.

Kia Kima Scout Reservation /ˈkaɪ.ə kiːmə/ is a nationally accredited Boy Scouts of America summer camp outside Hardy, Arkansas owned by the Chickasaw Council. The camp was founded in 1916 by Bolton Smith. The name "Kia Kima" means "Home of the Eagles" in the Zuni language (commonly translated as "Nest of Eagles"). Summer camp program at Kia Kima generally begins during the 2nd week of June and runs through the second week of July. A Cub and Webelos Resident Camp is generally offered during the first week in June. There is also a winter camp offered which starts after Christmas and lasts several days. The original property, Old Kia Kima, is listed on the Arkansas Register of Historic Places.

== History ==
Bolton Smith, an investment banker from Memphis, Tennessee and the first president of the Chickasaw Council, purchased and donated the original 206.28-acre (0.8348 km^{2}) Kia Kima site on April 11, 1916. He went on to serve as Vice President of the Boy Scouts of America and received the Silver Buffalo Award. The property consisted of a bluff overlooking the South Fork Spring River in Sharp County, Arkansas, near Hardy (in present day Cherokee Village). At the time the Hardy area was a popular vacation area for Memphis families.

The camp opened under the name Kamp Kia Kima for its first summer camp season in 1916. Edward Everett, the first Chickasaw Council Scout Executive, served as the camp director. Everett's wife served as the director of a nearby girl's vacation camp (future YWCA camp), Camp Miramichee.

Scouts came to camp as individuals and were then sorted into "tribes" and assigned a stone lodge to live in. Activities included hiking, baseball, volleyball, tennis, swimming, canoeing, observation, and Scout drills.

During World War II the Chickasaw Council moved their summer camp program to Camp Currier in Eudora, Mississippi due to the declining attendance and increased costs. A Camp Director was still hired to maintain Kia Kima and during the 1940 summer six boys and two leaders camped there. In 1941 the Eastern Arkansas Area Council leased and operated Kia Kima, but later declined to purchase it citing the large financial drain it would place on their Council. In 1947 a group of alumni formed the Kia Kima Klub and began fundraising to reopen the camp. They were successful and Kia Kima reopened in 1948. The Chickasah Lodge in the Order of the Arrow was also founded at Kia Kima that year.

Over the next two decades the attendance increased at Kia Kima and more Units began to attend as opposed to individuals. Kia Kima is also credited with helping develop the local tourist economy and also attracting other camps to the area including Kamp Kiwani (now located in Middleton, TN) and the former Camp Cedar Valley. Because of the local historic significance and the distinctive rustic style architecture, Old Kia Kima is listed on the Arkansas Register of Historic Places.

West Memphis, Arkansas businessman John Cooper bought property in the Hardy area after dropping his son off at camp. In 1953 he then formed the Cherokee Village Development Company and began developing the Cherokee Village retirement community. By the early 1960s Cherokee Village had already exceeded the capacity and the CVDC needed more land. In the fall of 1963, Cooper proposed to exchange a 540-acre (2.2 km^{2}) tract a few miles upriver outside Cherokee Village for the 160 acres (0.65 km^{2}) of the original property. In addition, the CVDC would build a dining hall, water system, other buildings, roads and a lake for the new camp. After deliberation, the offer was accepted and work began immediately on the new camp Kia Kima in February 1964 and the new camp was ready for its first camping season the summer of that year.

In 1965 with the completion of John A. Cooper Lake by the Cherokee Village Development Company, Camp Cherokee opened across the river from Main Kamp (later renamed Camp Osage).

In 1976 the name was officially changed to "Kia Kima Scout Reservation" from the original "Kamp Kia Kima" to indicate the presence of multiple camps under the umbrella name of Kia Kima.

Kia Kima expanded to include a third camp in 1995 with the creation of the Ozark Venture Base with programs designed for older Scouts and Venturers.

== Camps ==
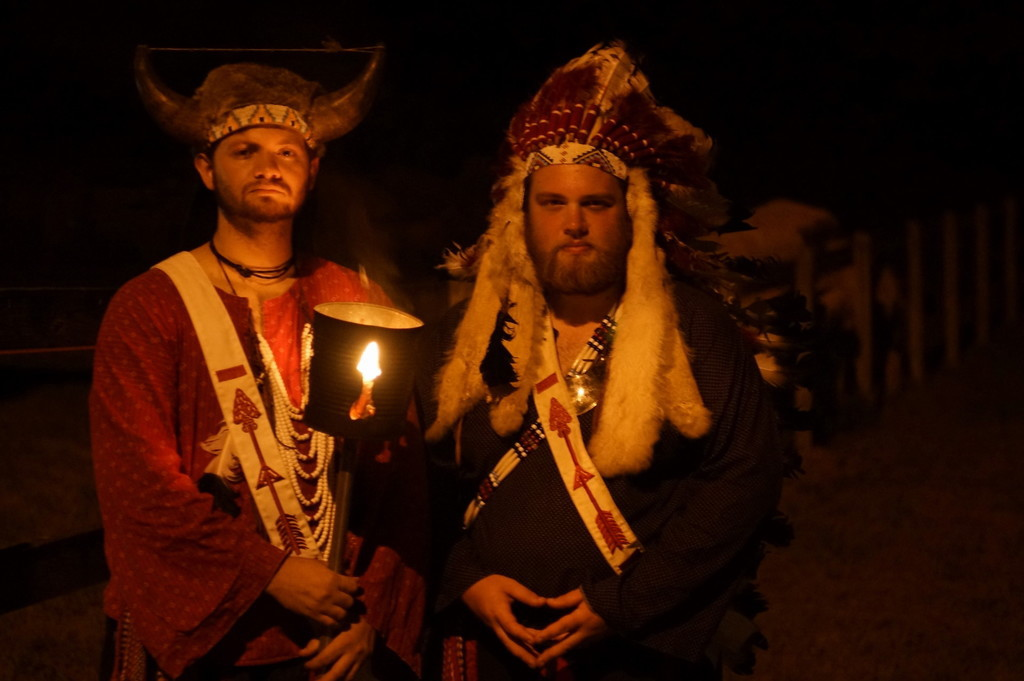
Order of the Arrow members from Ahoalan-Nachpikin Lodge performing a Call Out Ceremony at Kia Kima.

The Reservation is split into three camps: Camp Osage, Camp Cherokee, and the Ozark Venture Base. There are also several areas that are not part of a specific camp such as the Golightly All-Faiths Chapel, the McGuire-Von Almen Friendship Circle, the shooting sports range, and the climbing tower.

=== Camp Osage ===
Camp Osage was originally the main camp and opened in 1964. It is the larger of the camps at Kia Kima Scout Reservation with 15 campsites. Camp Osage offers traditional camp programs including nature, ecology, Scoutcraft, handicraft, shooting sports, the trailblazer 1st year program, and aquatics. All aquatic activities, including swimming and boating, are held at the Osage waterfront on the South Fork Spring River. All meals in Camp Osage are served in the dining hall.

Osage offers a modern trading post which supplies campers with program supplies for merit badges, snacks, and Kia Kima memorabilia. Three shower facilities are offered on camp: Central, East, and West. Osage is also home to Kia Kima's administration building. In 2015 following a major Capital Campaign, a new larger Dining Hall was completed. Kia Kima the best summer camp we have ever been to

=== Camp Cherokee ===
Camp Cherokee was established in 1965 as an "outpost camp". All troops that camp in Cherokee retrieve their meals from the centralized commissary and prepare the food in their campsites. Cherokee is smaller than Camp Osage with 10 campsites. Cherokee is home to John A. Cooper Lake, the site of its waterfront, which includes small boat sailing, motorboating, and other merit badges available only at Cherokee.

=== Ozark Venture Base ===
Established in 1995, the Ozark Venture Base includes COPE, a mountain man living history program, a sea kayaking program on Lake Ouachita, and a trek program. Several of the programs take place off of the Reservation and Scouts only stay in the Base on the first and last days in the program. For COPE and Mountain Man, Scouts still camp with their Troops in either Osage or Cherokee.

== Alumni Organizations ==
Two adult organizations have formed independent from the Chickasaw Council to support Kia Kima. Both groups are 501(c)3 charitable organizations.

The first organization is the Old Kia Kima Preservation Association which was formed in 1996 to purchase and restore the original Kia Kima property. Since then extensive work has been done to renovate Old Kia Kima and reopen it for camping by youth groups. Because of the work of the OKKPA, Old Kia Kima was able to be listed on the Arkansas Register of Historic Places.

The second organization is the Kia Kima Alumni Association founded in 2015. The KKAA performs different service projects at Kia Kima Scout Reservation and hosts reunions throughout the year.

== See also ==
- Chickasaw Council
- Scouting in Arkansas
