= Old Kia Kima =

Privately held youth campground in Sharp County, Arkansas

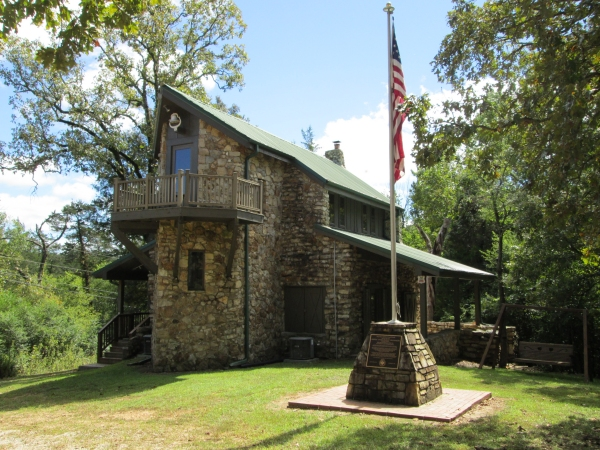
- Thunderbird Lodge

- Old Kia Kima (Arkansas)
- Owner: Old Kia Kima; Preservation Association
- Location: on the South Fork of the Spring River near Hardy, Arkansas
- Country: United States
- Coordinates: 36.31221°N 91.51641°W
- Camp size: 43 acres
- Founded: 1916
- Founder: Chickasaw Council, Boy Scouts of America
- Website www.oldkiakima.org

Old Kia Kima is a restored former Boy Scout summer camp now owned and operated by the Old Kia Kima Preservation Association. The camp is situated on a bluff overlooking the South Fork of the Spring River near Hardy, Sharp County, Arkansas. In 2015, Old Kia Kima was listed on the Arkansas Register of Historic Places for local historical significance and local architectural style.

== History ==
Bolton Smith, an investment banker from Memphis, Tennessee and the first president of the Chickasaw Council, purchased and donated the original 206.28-acre (0.8348 km^{2}) Kia Kima site on April 11, 1916. The property consisted of a bluff overlooking the South Fork Spring River in Sharp County, Arkansas, near Hardy. The original Kamp Kia Kima opened in 1916 and operated (excluding World War II years) as a Boy Scout summer camp until 1963. For the next 33 years the property was in a state of abandonment and ruin until 1996 when the Old Kia Kima Preservation Association was formed with the mission to restore the camp.

In 1964, Boy Scout summer camp activities were moved upriver to a new larger camp which now operates as the Kia Kima Scout Reservation.

After having been closed for 39 years, in 2002 the camp reopened under the name Old Kia Kima for camping by qualified youth groups.

== Old Kia Kima Preservation Association ==
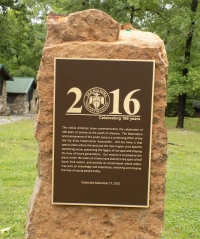
100th Anniversary

The Old Kia Kima Preservation Association is a 501(c)(3) non-profit youth leadership and service organization formed to restore the former Boy Scout summer camp and provide camping facilities to qualified youth groups so they can experience the spirit of Old Kia Kima.

== See also ==
- Scouting in Arkansas
