= Josephine Groves Holloway =

African-American scouting pioneer

- Holloway in the early 1960s.
- Born: Josephine Amanda Groves; March 10, 1898; Cowpens, South Carolina
- Died: December 7, 1988 (aged 90); Nashville, Tennessee
- Known for: Girls' scouting
- Spouse: Guerney Holloway (m. 1925)
- Children: 3

Josephine Amanda Groves Holloway (March 10, 1898 – December 7, 1988) was an American woman who broke the color barrier for African-American girls to become involved in scouting in the state of Tennessee. In 1933 she began organizing unofficial scout groups, which were recognized in 1942, and eventually desegregated.

She was honored by Girl Scouts of the USA with the naming of Camp Holloway in 1955, and with the "Hidden Heroine" award in 1976.

== Early life and education ==
Josephine Amanda Groves was born on March 10, 1898, in Cowpens, South Carolina. She was the seventh of ten children. Her parents were Emma Gray Groves and John Wesley Groves, a Methodist minister.

She attended Fisk University, a historically black university in Nashville, Tennessee, graduating in June 1923 with an A. B. Degree (a bachelor's). In 1926, Holloway obtained a second bachelor's degree at the Tennessee Agricultural & Industrial State College (now Tennessee State University).

== Scouting career ==
After she graduated from Fisk University, Holloway began working in scouting for girls in 1923 at the Bethlehem Center, a social settlement house home to at-risk women and girls. Upon marrying, however, she ceased working at the Bethlehem Center, as she was forced to resign by the director who claimed that a married woman would not have time to fulfill her work obligations.

When her eldest daughter turned six in 1933, Holloway petitioned the Nashville Girl Scout Council to create a new, segregated troop for African-American girls. They declined her request, saying that maintaining separate facilities would cost too much. Holloway went ahead and started her own unofficial troop, and encouraged her friends to do the same.

By 1942, the number of African-American Girl Scout troops caused the Nashville Council to officially recognize them. In 1944, Holloway was hired by the Council to be a field advisor for the organization. In 1951, the Council began integrating black and white troops, a process that was completed in 1962 when they ceased maintaining a separate "Negro district". Holloway did not view the end of segregation as necessarily positive, however, stating that it reduced black girls' exposure to "examples of black strength and pride". In 1963, Holloway retired from scouting.

== Personal life ==
She married Guerney Holloway, a coworker from the Bethlehem Center on June 30, 1925 and had three daughters: Nareda Wenefred, Josephine Alzilee, and Weslia Juanita.

== Death ==
Holloway died on December 7, 1988, at age ninety.

== Honors and distinctions ==
In 1951, land was purchased by the Girl Scouts so that African-American girls would have a place to go to summer camp, as many state parks denied entrance to African Americans. In 1955, Camp Holloway was opened; as of 2016, it is still operational and open to all girl scouts.

Holloway was the first African-American employed by the Girl Scouts in Middle Tennessee. In the 1976 celebration of the US bicentennial, she was given the "Hidden Heroine" award. In 1991, the Girl Scout headquarters opened the Josephine G. Holloway Historical Collection and Gallery.

== See also ==
- Scouting in Tennessee
