= Scouting in Arkansas =

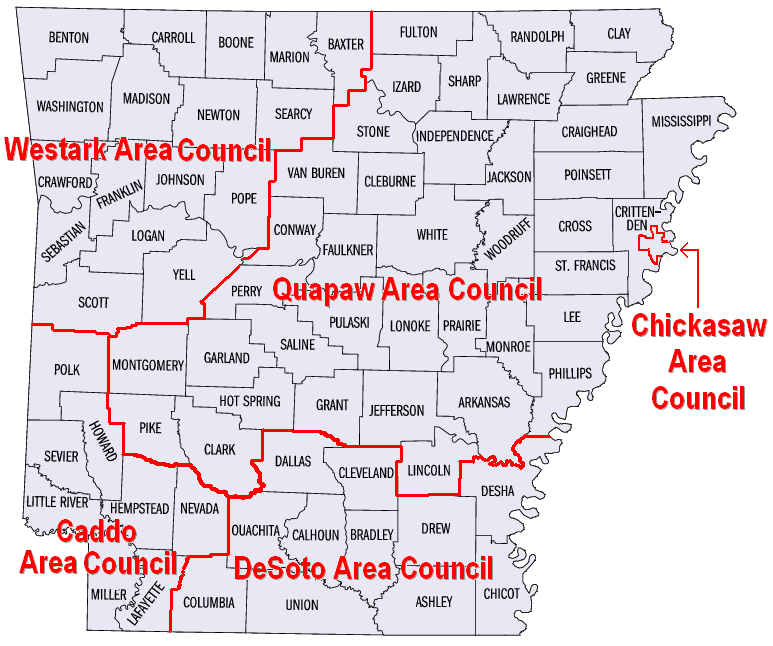
- Boy Scout Councils Serving Arkansas

- Map of Girl Scout Councils in Arkansas

Scouting in Arkansas has a long history, from 1913 to the present day, serving thousands of youth in programs that suit the environment in which they live.

== Boy Scouts of America in Arkansas ==
=== Early history (1910–1950) ===
- Arkadelphia Boy Scout Hut
- U.S. National Register of Historic Places
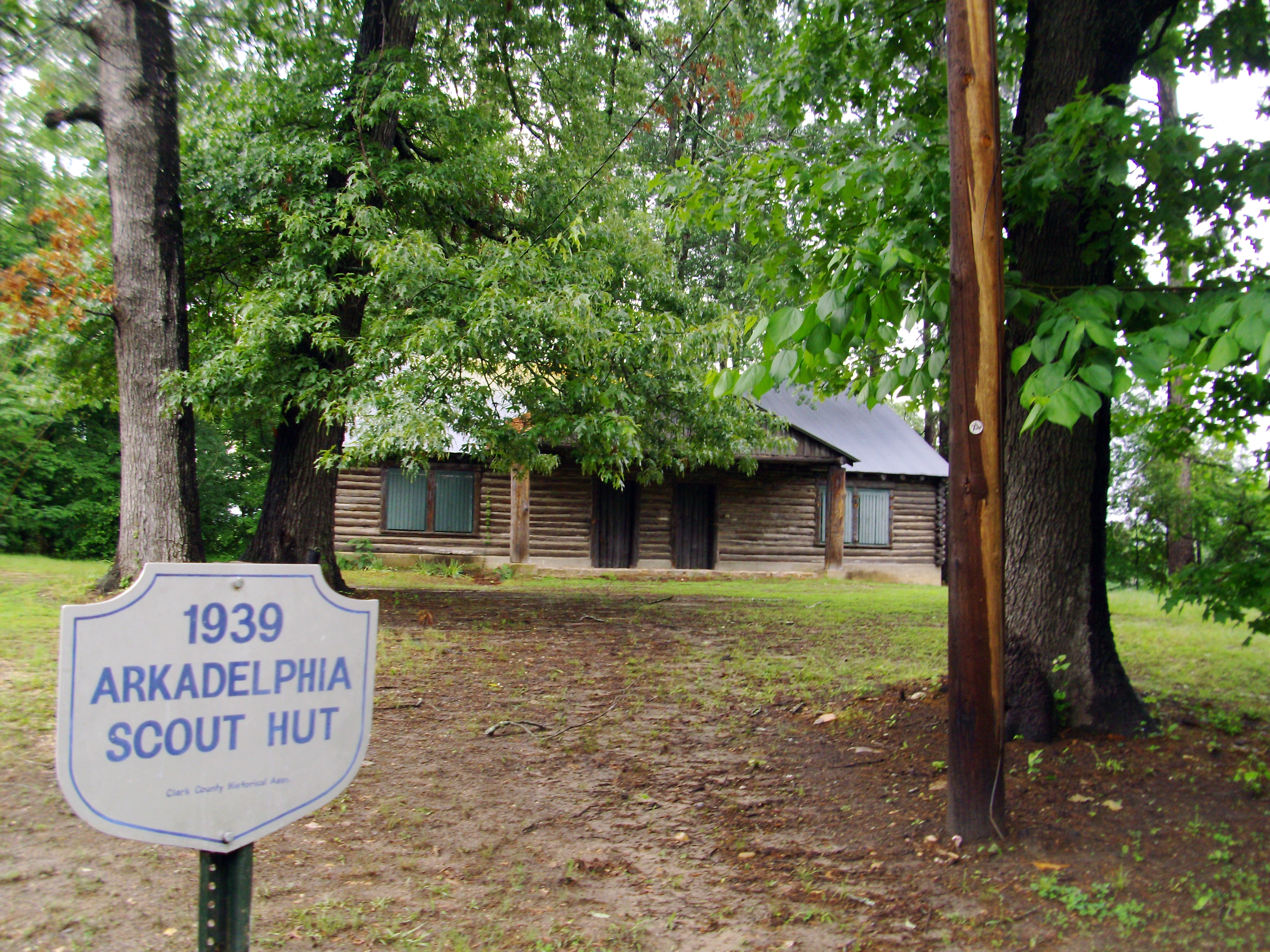

- Location within Arkansas
- Location: 8th St., Arkadelphia, Arkansas
- Coordinates: 34°7′45″N 93°3′16″W
- Area: less than one acre
- Built: 1939
- Built by: A.F. Bishop
- Architect: National Youth Administration
- Architectural style: Late 19th And Early 20th Century American Movements, Rustic
- NRHP reference No.: 01001526
- Added to NRHP: January 28, 2002

The Boy Scouts of America (BSA) began in Arkansas in 1913, when the Little Rock Council was chartered by the National Boy Scout Council and was directed by a volunteer commissioner. In 1920, the Little Rock Council was reclassified and W. G. Moseley became the first council executive in 1921. Two years later, the Little Rock Council was renamed to the Pulaski County Council.

In 1916, the De Soto Area Council was formed (#013). In 1916, the Blytheville Council was formed; it disbanded in 1917. In 1916, the Westark Area Council (#016) was formed. In 1916, Kia Kima Scout Reservation was opened in Hardy by the Chickasaw Council (#558).

In 1917, the Jonesboro Council (#019) was formed; it changed its name to the Saint Francis Valley Council (#019) in 1923. The council disbanded in 1930.

In 1918, the Hot Springs Council (#014) was formed; it changed its name to the Ouachita Area Council (#014) in 1925.

In 1919, the Jefferson County Council (#017) was formed; it changed its name to the Kanawha Area Council (#017) in 1930.

In 1920, the Fort Smith Council (#016) was formed; it changed its name to the Fort Smith-Van Buren Council (#016) in 1924. In 1928 the council merged into the Northwest Arkansas Council (#016). In 1926, the Ozark Council (#753) was formed; it merged into Northwest Arkansas in 1928. In 1930, the council changed its name to the Fort Smith Area Council, changing again in 1936 to the Westark Area Council (#016) .

In 1922, the Fayetteville Council (#015) was formed; it changed its name to the Eastern Arkansas Area Council (#015) in 1935.

In 1924, the Crowley Ridge Council (#677) was formed; it changed its name to the Mohawk Council (#677) in 1926.

In 1930, the Kanawha Area Council was formed; it disbanded in 1934. The council disbanded in 1930, with half of the council moving to the De Soto Area Council (#013) and the other half to the Quapaw Area Council (#018).

=== Arkadelphia Boy Scout Hut ===
The Arkadelphia Boy Scout Hut, located in Central Park, Arkadelphia, is on the National Register of Historic Places. Since the roof and the original shutters and windows were replaced in 1953, the Hut is precluded from being listed on the National Register under Criterion C. However, it is listed under Criterion A as a "property that made a contribution to the major pattern of American history".

The Boy Scout Hut was constructed from 1938 to 1939 as a National Youth Administration (NYA) project. It is an example of the typical type of buildings constructed by the New Deal's Works Progress Administration (WPA), Civilian Conservation Corps (CCC) and NYA during the Great Depression. However, it is the only known building constructed by the NYA and the only building designed in a Rustic style that remains standing in Arkadelphia that was designed and constructed during the New Deal era.

Aubrey Williams, Executive Director of the National Youth Administration, stated in a press release on 24 September 1937:

City Recreation Departments, children's agencies, YMCA's, YWCA's, Settlement Houses, institutions for the blind, public schools, orphanages, hospitals for handicapped and crippled children, Boy's clubs, Boy Scouts, community centers and churches were reported as cooperating agencies in supervising the students and providing facilities for increased recreational programs to all young people in the community. [sic]

—

While the Boy Scout Hut was constructed specifically as a meeting place for two local Boy Scout troops, and its use is controlled by the Boy Scouts, the building is actually owned by the city of Arkadelphia. Starting around 1958, the Boy Scouts allowed local Girl Scout troops to use the building. Currently Cub Scout Pack 3024 and Girl Scout Troop 454 use the building.

=== Boy Scouting in Arkansas today ===
Currently, all BSA Scouts in the State of Arkansas are served by four area councils: the Caddo Area Council, the De Soto Area Council, the Natural State Council, and the Chickasaw Council.

==== Caddo Area Council ====
Caddo Area Council (#584)
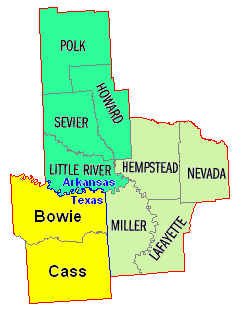
- Cossatot Double Eagle; Long Horn
- Owner: Boy Scouts of America
- Headquarters: Texarkana, Texas
- Country: United States
- Website caddobsa.org

The Caddo Area Council serves youth in ten counties in southwest Arkansas and northeast Texas.

===== Organization =====
The council is divided into the Cossatot, Double Eagle and Longhorn districts.

===== Order of the Arrow =====
The council is supported by the Akela Wahinapay Lodge #232.

===== Camps =====
- Camp Preston Hunt - in Texarkana, Arkansas, is a year-round camping facility is used for Cub Scouts, Scouts BSA, and outside organizations. Located on the outskirts of Texarkana, Camp Preston Hunt is over 250 acres, with cabins, as well as numerous areas for primitive tent camping, a large dining hall, lake with canoes, shower facilities, cub pirate ship, and pavilions. Camp Preston Hunt is used year-round.

==== Chickasaw Council ====
Chickasaw Council (#558)
- Owner: Boy Scouts of America
- Headquarters: Memphis, Tennessee
- Country: United States
- Founded: February 22, 1916
- Membership: 7,339 youth 4,135 adults (as of January 13, 2015)
- Website www.chickasaw.org

The Chickasaw Council serves Scouts in Crittenden County, Arkansas, as well as in Shelby County, Tennessee, and fifteen counties in northwest Mississippi. It was founded on February 22, 1916, to oversee the many Boy Scout troops already present in Memphis, Tennessee. The Chickasaw Council has two camps: Kia Kima Scout Reservation and Camp Currier. The Chickasaw Council is also home to the Order of the Arrow Ahoalan-Nachpikin Lodge 558.

==== De Soto Area Council ====
De Soto Area Council (#013)
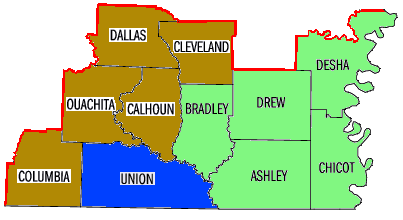
- Three Rivers Conquistador; Loblolly

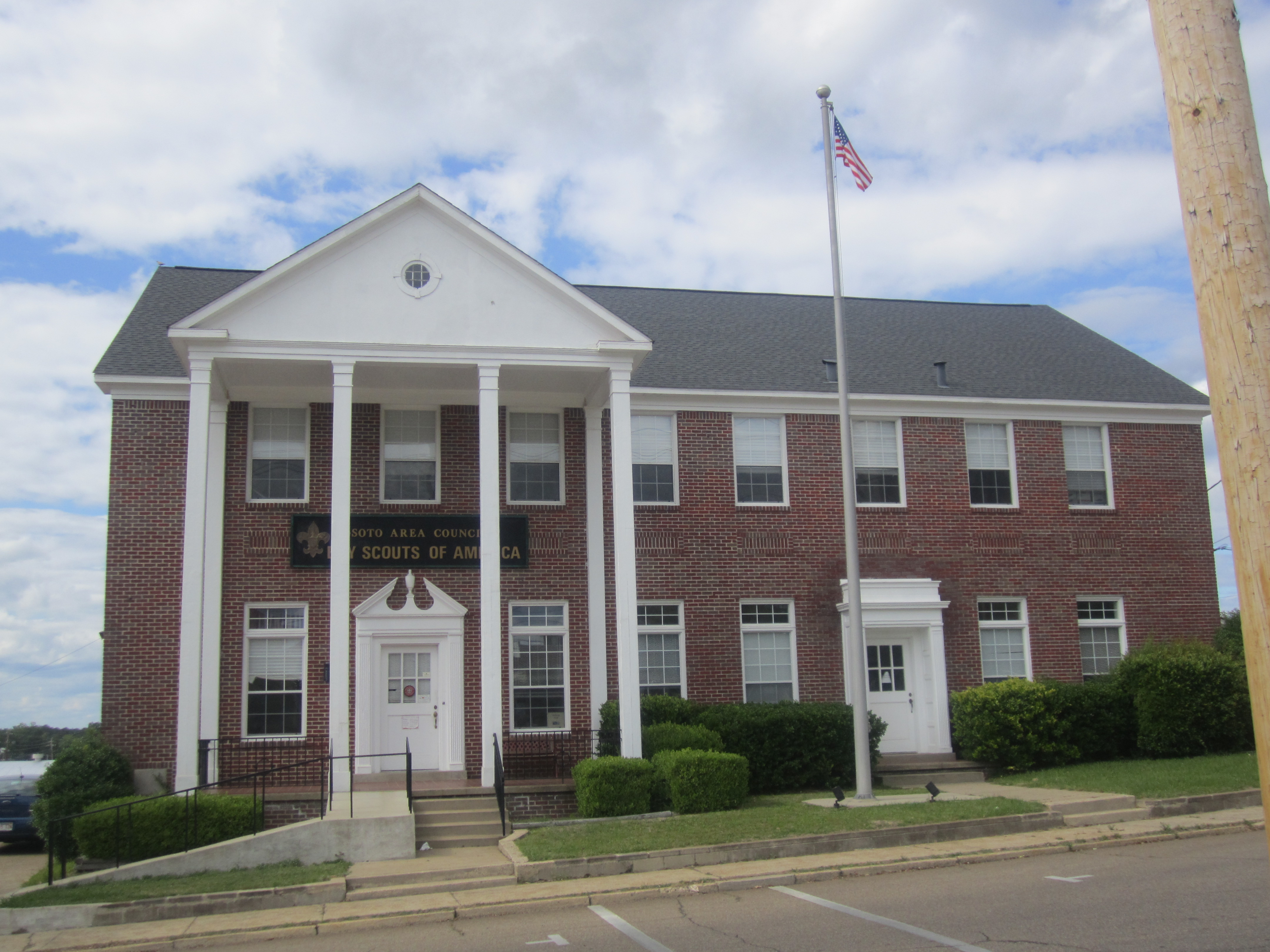
- De Soto Area Council office
- Owner: Boy Scouts of America
- Headquarters: El Dorado, Arkansas
- Country: United States
- Website desotobsa.org

The De Soto Area Council serves youth in eleven counties in southeastern Arkansas. On June 1, 2024, De Soto Area Council merged into the Natural State Council.

===== Organization =====
The council is divided into three districts.

===== Camps =====
- Camp De Soto

===== Order of the Arrow =====
The council is supported by the Abooikpaagun Lodge (#399). The lodge's headquarters is located in El Dorado and was founded in 1948, the same year the Order of the Arrow became officially integrated into the national camping program of the Boy Scouts of America.

==== Quapaw Area Council ====
Quapaw Area Council (#018)
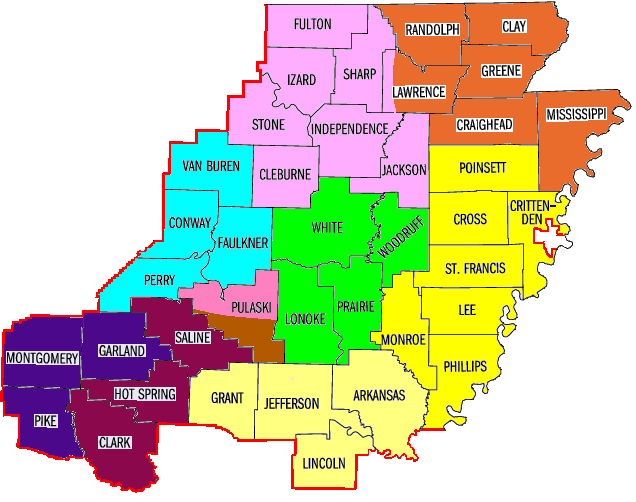
- Cherokee Delta; Diamond Lake Foothills; Mohawk Saracen; Nischa Sipo Three Rivers; Thunderbird White River
- Owner: Boy Scouts of America
- Headquarters: Little Rock, Arkansas
- Country: United States
Previous; Pulaski County Council	
- Website quapawbsa.org

The Quapaw Area Council is the largest in Arkansas in both area and members, and is headquartered in Little Rock. In 1927, the Pulaski County Council was renamed the Quapaw Area Council and covered several counties. In 1934, the Kanawha Area Council of Jefferson County was split between the Quapaw Area Council and the De Soto Area Council, which had a council office in El Dorado (Union County).

In 2002 and 2012 respectively, the Eastern Arkansas Area Council and Ouachita Area Council merged with the Quapaw Area Council. These mergers enlarged the Quapaw Area Council from seventeen counties to thirty-nine.

On October 26, 2023, the Quapaw Area Council Executive Board and voting membership held a special meeting and voted in favor of merging with the Westark Area Council to create the "Natural State Council". Westark Area Council's Executive Board and Membership held a similar meeting and vote on Tuesday, October 24, 2023, and also voted in favor of the resolution. The Natural State Council officially formed on December 1, 2023. https://www.quapawbsa.org/merger. On June 1, 2024, De Soto Area Council voted to merge into the Natural State Council to "better support the statewide scounting movement".

The council serves over 18,000 youth and 3,600 adults in thirty-nine counties divided into nine districts, and approximately 100 boys become Eagle Scouts each year.

Council members who have received national honors include Dr. Raymond V. Biondo and Dr. David Briscoe, both of whom received the Silver Buffalo Award.

===== Order of the Arrow =====
The Order of the Arrow Quapaw Lodge 160 was formed with fifteen members in June 1939 and inducted sixty-two members during the summer of 1939. Today, the lodge has about 500 members.

===== Camps =====
Currently the Quapaw Area Council owns and operates the Gus Blass Scout Reservation, west of Damascus.

The first permanent camping facility for the Quapaw council was Camp Quapaw, opened in 1925. It was located on the Saline River west of Benton in Saline County. This early facility was limited, so between 1930 and 1931, fifty-five additional acres were purchased, and a mess hall was constructed. The numbers of scouts attending camp increased, which led to overuse of the facilities. Additionally, the Army Corps of Engineers was considering a dam on the Saline River. This would have flooded a section of the camp.

In 1975, the council acquired Camp Kiwanis in order to accommodate more Scouts and camping activities. This was an unimproved site which included over 2,900 acres west of Damascus. It was renamed the Cove Creek Scout Reservation and opened in 1976. Camp Quapaw was then closed and later sold.

In 1981, the portion of Cove Creek that was used as a permanent summer camp was named Camp Montgomery, after Nile Montgomery, a previous scout executive. The lake was named Lake Butler, for Richard C. Butler Sr., a supporter of the local scouting program.

In 2001, the Cove Creek Scout Reservation and Camp Nile Montgomery were renamed the Gus Blass Scout Reservation and Camp Rockefeller in honor of Gus Blass II and Lieutenant Governor Winthrop P. Rockefeller, both of whom were supporters of the Boy Scout program for many years.

The Gus Blass Scout Reservation also includes the Donald W. Reynolds Scout Training Center. This facility includes a 320-seat dining hall with commercial kitchen, 88 person/28 room sleeping wing including two ADA compliant rooms, three large classrooms, an area with a large fireplace, two large terraced areas and additional camping on the adjacent property.

==== Westark Area Council ====
Westark Area Council (#016)
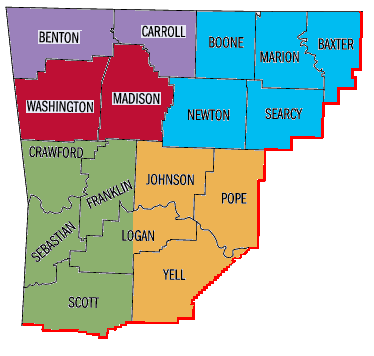
- Cornerstone Razorback; Butterfield Trail Ozark; Magazine Mountain
- Owner: Boy Scouts of America
- Headquarters: Fort Smith, Arkansas
- Location: 1401 Old Greenwood Road, Fort Smith, AR 72901
- Country: United States
- Founded: 1920-2023
- Membership: 6500
- President: Greg Fogle
- Council Commissioner: Robert "Bob" Christiansen
- Scout Executive: Chris Daughtrey
- Assistant Scout Executive: Christian Swain
- Website westarkbsa.org

The WestArk Area Council was originally organized in July 1920. The council is divided into five districts and is headquartered in Fort Smith. It serves over 6,500 youth in seventeen counties located in northwestern Arkansas.

Starting in July 1920, the council originally included only the city of Fort Smith and was named the Fort Smith Council. From 1922 to 1937 the council underwent a number of name changes and expansions. In 1922, the council expanded to include the city of Van Buren and was named the Fort Smith – Van Buren Council. Then in 1927, the council incorporating all of Crawford and Sebastian Counties, and the portion of Franklin County south of the Arkansas River. In 1928, the council took over an additional 13 counties, 10 of which had previously been part of the Ozark Council. From 1922 to 1930 the council was named the Northwest Arkansas Council, and from 1922 to 1937 it was named the Fort Smith Area Council. Finally, in 1937 the name changed to the Westark Area Council. On December 1, 2023, Westark Area Council voted to merge with the Quapaw Area Council to form the Natural State Council.

The Westark Area Council currently serves over 6,500 youth in seventeen counties in northwestern Arkansas. The Council Scout Service Center is located at 1401 Old Greenwood Road, Fort Smith, Arkansas, 72901 and was built in 1963.

In 2003, the council began a Youth Diversion Program that provides an alternative to the formal court proceedings for first-time offenders and gives a second chance to those young adults who are willing to accept responsibility and move forward. Through structured activities, this program aims to reduce the recidivism rate among these youth.

===== OA =====
The council is supported by the Wachtschu Mawachpo Lodge 559. The Lodge began in 1963 with 103 members. The first Lodge chapters were Butterfield, Northwest, Ozark, and Magazine Mountain. It now has five chapters: Butterfield Trail, Magazine Mountain, Ozark, Razorback and Cornerstone.

===== Camps =====
In 1953, land for a Scout camp was purchased and developed in Camp Orr. It has been in use since 1955 and covers nearly 600 acres of the Buffalo National River Wilderness Area. It is located south of Harrison, and is the only Boy Scout Camp situated within a National Park.

In 1973 the Arkansas State Legislature permitted the Westark Area Council to purchase 2,842 acres of the Booneville Sanatorium, just south of Booneville, for a future camp development. The land development began in 1975 and completed in May 1976. Construction of the camp started in the spring of 1976. The Scout camp is now known as Rogers Scout Reservation.

The council also owns Camp Spencer, a 100-acre primitive camping facility, located on the shore of Lake Norfork, east of Mountain Home.

==== High Adventure ====
There is one High Adventure Scouting event in Arkansas.

- White River Canoe Race

There is also one regional High Adventure Base within Arkansas. Camp Orr High Adventure Base located in Jasper Ar off of the Buffalo National River. Camp Orr Is the first and only camp or proprietary within a National Park.

 Camp Orr is filled with over 100 miles of hiking in the Ozarks, The Buffalo river where you have access to all 165 miles to float where you please. WestArk Area Council has also opened up nearly 20 miles of high quality mountain biking within the Camp. You will also have access to countless climbing and rappelling within the Camp. Most notably, Garrhole Bluff! Garr  is a 300Ft repel that you are able to do within Camp.

http://www.westarkbsa.org/camping

== Girl Scouting in Arkansas ==
There are two Girl Scout councils in Arkansas.

=== Girl Scouts - Diamonds of Arkansas, Oklahoma and Texas ===
Girl Scouts - Diamonds of Arkansas, Oklahoma and Texas
- Owner: GSUSA
- Headquarters: North Little Rock, Arkansas
- Country: United States
- Chair of the Board: Barbara Bethell
- Chief Executive Officer: Denise Stewart
- Website girlscoutsdiamonds.org

The Girl Scouts - Diamonds of Arkansas, Oklahoma and Texas serves girls in Adair, LeFlore, and Sequoyah counties in Oklahoma, girls in Bowie and Cass counties in Texas, and all of Arkansas except Crittenden county. It was formed on October 1, 2008, by the merger of Arkansas Post Girl Scout Council, Girl Scouts of Conifer Council, Girl Scouts of Crowley's Ridge Council, Girl Scout Council of Mount Magazine Area, Noark Girl Scout Council, and Girl Scouts of Ouachita Council.

==== Service centers ====
- Fayetteville
- Fort Smith
- Jonesboro
- Pine Bluff
- Texarkana

==== Camps ====
- Camp Cahinnio is almost 400 acres (160 ha) near Booneville.
- Camp Crossed Arrows is 400 acres (160 ha) south of Batesville. It opened in 1965.
- Burnham Woods is a small, 13.5 acres (5.5 ha) property serving the Fort Smith service center.
- Radford House is a 14.23 acres (5.76 ha) property in Hot Springs.
- Camp NOARK is 300 acres (120 ha) in the Ozarks near Huntsville.
- Camp High Point is 163 acres (66 ha) in the foothills of the Ouachita Mountains east of Mena. It was established in 1945. Not in use.
- Camp Taloha - not in use
- Camp Kemp - not in use

===== Former camps =====
- Camp Storeywood is 100 acres (40 ha) near Searcy. Closed September 2009.

===== Historic =====
Camp Ouachita was used as a Girl Scout camp from 1937 until 1979 when the cost of providing potable water proved too much for the local council. It is now a National Historic District as the only surviving Works Progress Administration (WPA) constructed Girl Scout camp. It was built in the Ouachita National Forest for the Little Rock Area Girl Scout Council, which before had only occasional use of a local Boy Scout camp.

=== Girl Scouts Heart of The South ===
Serves Crittenden County in Arkansas.

== See also ==
- Roy Williams (Scouting)
- Southern Region (Boy Scouts of America)
