= Quapaw Area Council =

Boy Scouts council in Arkansas, US

- Owner: Boy Scouts of America
- Location: 3220 Cantrell Road, Little Rock, AR 72202
- Country: United States
- Coordinates: 34.763°N 92.311°W
- Founded: 1927
- Defunct: 2023
- Membership: 18,000 youth 3,600 adults
- Scout Executive: Shanna Richardson
Previous; Pulaski County Council	
- Website www.quapawbsa.org

The Quapaw Area Council was a regional council of the Boy Scouts of America. It was the largest council in Arkansas before its end in 2023 by merger in both area and members and is headquartered in Little Rock. The council serves over 18,000 youth and 3,600 adults in thirty-nine counties divided into ten districts, and approximately 100 boys become Eagle Scouts each year.

== History ==
The Boy Scouts of America began in Arkansas in 1913, when the Little Rock Council was chartered by the National Boy Scout Council and was directed by a volunteer commissioner. In 1920, the Little Rock Council was reclassified and W. G. Moseley became the first council executive in 1921. Two years later, the Little Rock Council was renamed to the Pulaski County Council.

In 1927, the Pulaski County Council was renamed the Quapaw Area Council and covered several counties. In 1934, the Kanawha Area Council of Jefferson County was split between the Quapaw Area Council and the De Soto Area Council, which had a council office in El Dorado (Union County).

In May 2001, after years of struggling, it was decided that the Eastern Arkansas Area Council was no longer able to continue service. On October 8, 2001, the board of Quapaw Area Council voted to accept the merger proposal of the former EAAC, and the EAAC ceased to function, effective January 10, 2002. This merger enlarged the Council from seventeen counties to thirty-three counties.

In 2011 the Ouachita Area Council, founded in 1938, proposed that it merge into the Quapaw Area Council. On October 26, 2011, Quapaw’s executive board approved a request and the Ouachita Area Council ceased to function, effective January 11, 2012. This merger enlarged the Council from thirty-three counties to its current size of thirty-nine counties. The Diamond Lake and Nischa Sipo districts were part of the Ouachita Area Council prior to the merger.

On October 26, 2023, the Quapaw Area Council Executive Board and voting membership held a special meeting and voted in favor of merging with the Westark Area Council to create the "Natural State Council". Westark Area Council's Executive Board and Membership held a similar meeting and vote on Tuesday, October 24, 2023, and also voted in favor of the resolution. The Natural State Council officially formed on December 1, 2023. https://www.quapawbsa.org/merger. On June 1, 2024, De Soto Area Council officially merged with the Natural State Council.

Council members who have received national honors include Dr. Raymond V. Biondo and Dr. David Briscoe, both of whom received the Silver Buffalo Award.

== Organization ==
The council is divided into 10 districts.

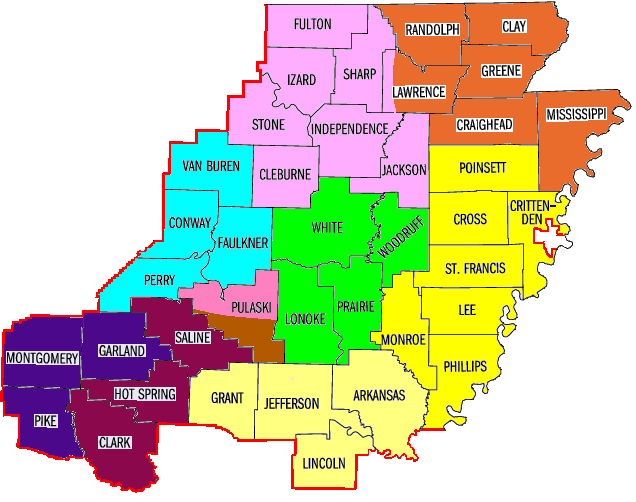
- Cherokee
- Delta
- Diamond Lake
- Foothills
- Pinnacle f/k/a Mohawk
- Saracen
- Nischa Sipo
- Three Rivers
- Thunderbird
- White River

== Camps ==
=== Gus Blass Scout Reservation ===
Gus Blass Scout Reservation Camp Rockefeller
- Location: Damascus, Arkansas
- Coordinates: 36.34455°N 91.59223°W
- Founded: 1976
- Property Manager: Terry Jones
- Camp Ranger: Shane Coursey
- Assistant Camp Ranger: Eddie Ridgeway
- Website www.camprockefeller.org

Currently the Quapaw Area Council owns and operates the Gus Blass Scout Reservation, west of Damascus, Arkansas.

The Gus Blass Scout Reservation also includes the Donald W. Reynolds Scout Training Center. This facilities include a 320-seat dining hall with commercial kitchen, 88 person/28 room sleeping wing including two ADA compliant rooms, 3 large classrooms, an area with a large fireplace, 2 large terraced areas and additional camping on the adjacent property.

In 1975, the council acquired Camp Kiwanis, in order to accommodate more Scouts and camping activities. Camp Kiwanis was an unimproved site which included over 2,900 acres west of Damascus, Arkansas. It was renamed the Cove Creek Scout Reservation and opened in 1976. Camp Quapaw was then closed and later sold.

In 1981, the portion of Cove Creek that was used as a permanent summer camp was named Camp Montgomery, after Nile Montgomery, a previous Scout executive. The lake was named Lake Butler, for Richard C. Butler Sr., a supporter of the local Scouting program.

In 2001, the Cove Creek Scout Reservation and Camp Nile Montgomery where renamed the Gus Blass Scout Reservation and Camp Rockefeller in honor of Gus Blass II and Lieutenant Governor Winthrop P. Rockefeller both of whom were supporters of the Boy Scout program for many years.

=== Historic Camps ===
The first permanent camping facilities for the Quapaw council was Camp Quapaw, opened in 1925. It was located on the Saline River west of Benton in Saline County. This early facility was limited so between 1930 and 1931, fifty-five additional acres were purchased, and a mess hall was constructed. The numbers of Scouts attending camp increased which led to an overuse of the facilities. Additionally, the Army Corps of Engineers was considering a dam on the Saline River. This would have flooded a section of the camp. In 1976 when Camp Kiwanis was purchases, Camp Quapaw was then closed and later sold.

In 2002, after the merger of the Eastern Arkansas Council, the council gained control of Camp Cedar Valley, which it promptly sold to a private owner. It is situated on 777 acres in the foothills of the Ozark Mountains, 2-1/2 miles south of Viola, Arkansas. It remains an active camp and is available for use by Scouts.

Then in 2012, after the merger of Ouachita Area Council, the council gained control of The Rhodes Scout Reservation, a 16,000 + acre camp on Lake DeGray, located in Bismarck, Arkansas near Arkadelphia. Again, this camp was promptly sold, this time to the Ouachita Camp Foundation, in partnership with the U.S. Army Corps of Engineers and the Ross Foundation, but is it available for use by the Troops of the Quapaw Area Council

== Order of the Arrow ==
Quapaw Lodge
- Founded: June 1939
- Membership: 500

The Order of the Arrow Quapaw Lodge 160 was formed with fifteen members in June 1939 and inducted sixty-two members during the summer of 1939. Today, the lodge has about 500 members.

== See also ==
- Scouting in Arkansas
