= Kemah =

Kemah may refer to:

- Kemah, Erzincan, a town and district of Erzincan Province, Turkey
- Kemah, Texas, a city in Galveston County, Texas, United States
- USS Kemah, a United States Navy patrol vessel in commission from 1918 to 1919
- Kemah Bob, an American comedian
