= Bhaini Kima =

- Village
- Location in Punjab, India Bhaini Kima (India)
- Coordinates: 30.9278937°N 76.0322775°E
- Country: India
- State: Punjab
- District: Ludhiana

Government
  - Type: Panchayati raj (India)
  - Body: Gram panchayat

Languages
  - Official: Punjabi
  - Other spoken: Hindi
- Time zone: UTC+5:30 (IST)
- Telephone code: 0161
- ISO 3166 code: IN-PB
- Vehicle registration: PB-10
- Website: ludhiana.nic.in

Bhaini Kima is a village located in the Ludhiana East tehsil, of Ludhiana district, Punjab.

== Administration ==
The village is administrated by a Sarpanch who is an elected representative of village as per constitution of India and Panchayati raj (India).

Particulars	Total	Male	Female
Total No. of Houses	50		
Population	298	158	140

== Child Sex Ratio details ==
The village population of children with an age group from 0-6 is 24 which makes up 8.05% of total population of village. Average Sex Ratio is 886 per 1000 males which is lower than the state average of 895. The child Sex Ratio as per census is 1000, higher than average of 846 in the state of Punjab.

== Cast ==
The village constitutes 68.46 %of Schedule Caste and the village doesn't have any Schedule Tribe population.
