= Bolton Smith =

American lawyer, investment banker, and philanthropist (1861–1935)

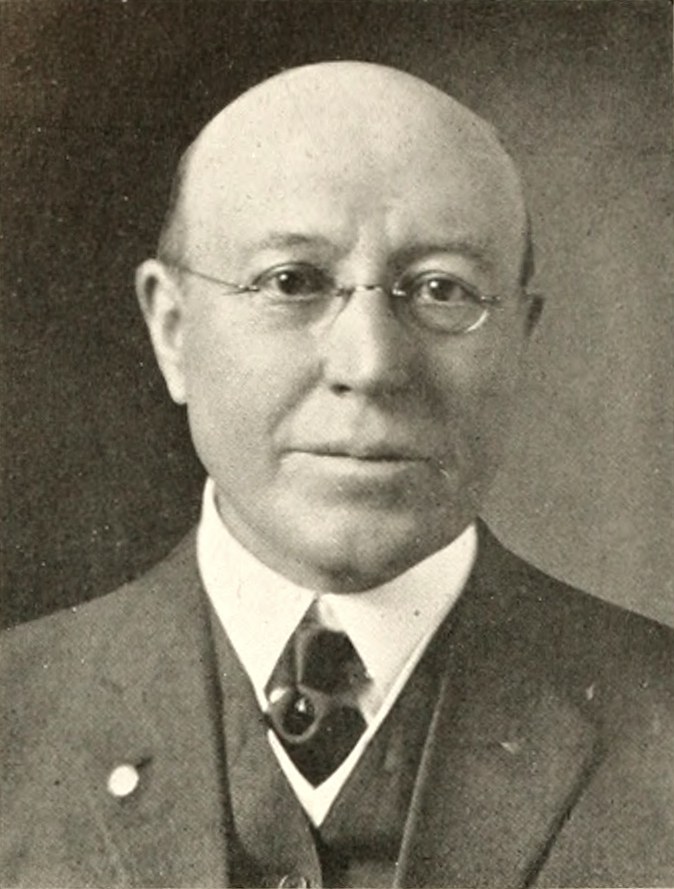
- Born: July 25, 1861; Indianapolis, Indiana, US
- Died: March 27, 1935 (aged 73); Washington, D.C., US
- Resting place: Elmwood Cemetery (Memphis, Tennessee)
- Occupation(s): Lawyer, Banker, Philanthropist
- Known for: Boy Scouts of America
- Spouse: Grace Carlile
- Children: 2

Bolton Smith (July 25, 1861 – March 27, 1935) was an American lawyer who was an early pioneer in the U.S. Scouting movement.

== Personal life ==
Born in 1861 in Indianapolis, Indiana, to Francis Smith and Sarah Smith, received his early education in Germany and Switzerland. After the death of his mother, he was raised by his maternal grandmother, poet Sarah T. Bolton. He graduated from American Central Law School in 1882, and also studied law at University of Virginia.

In 1889, he married Grace Carlile. They had two children, Louise Bolton-Smith (1891–1914) and Carlile Bolton-Smith (1902–2001).

== Professional life ==
Professionally, Bolton Smith practiced law with the firm Caldwell & Smith. He was a trustee for George Peabody College, a teachers college in Nashville, Tennessee.

He was a mason; and a member of the Nashville Business Men's Club, the Tennessee Law and Order League, and the Episcopal church.

== Scouting ==
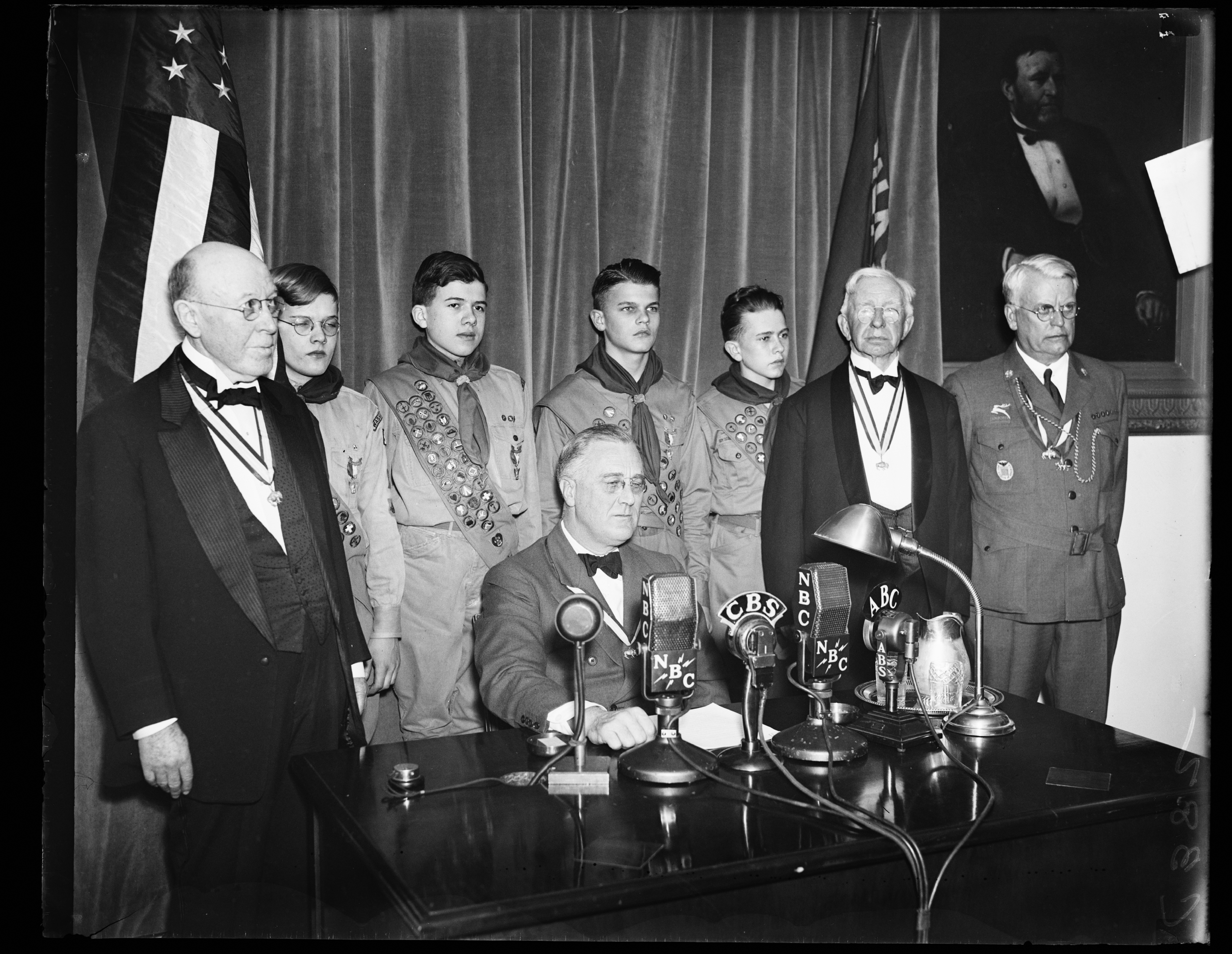
Smith (left)and a Boy Scout troop with President Franklin Roosevelt (seated), Colin H. Livingstone and James E. West, 1935

On February 22, 1916, with Scout Executive Edward Everett, Smith led the effort as Council President to organize the Chickasaw Council of the Boy Scouts of America. On April 11, 1916, Smith purchased the land which would become Camp Kia Kima.

Based on his work in Memphis, Smith was influential in the creation of the BSA's "National Committee on Inter-Racial Activities." This committee coordinated the creation of African American Scout troops. For this he was elected a national vice-president. For his contributions to Scouting, he was awarded the Silver Buffalo Award. ^{[a]}

Camp Bolton Smith operated by the Piedmont Area Council was named after Smith, in honor of his work to promote expanding Scouting in the African American community.

== See also ==
- List of recipients of the Silver Buffalo Award
