= South Fork Spring River =

Tributary river in the American state of Missouri

South Fork of the Spring River
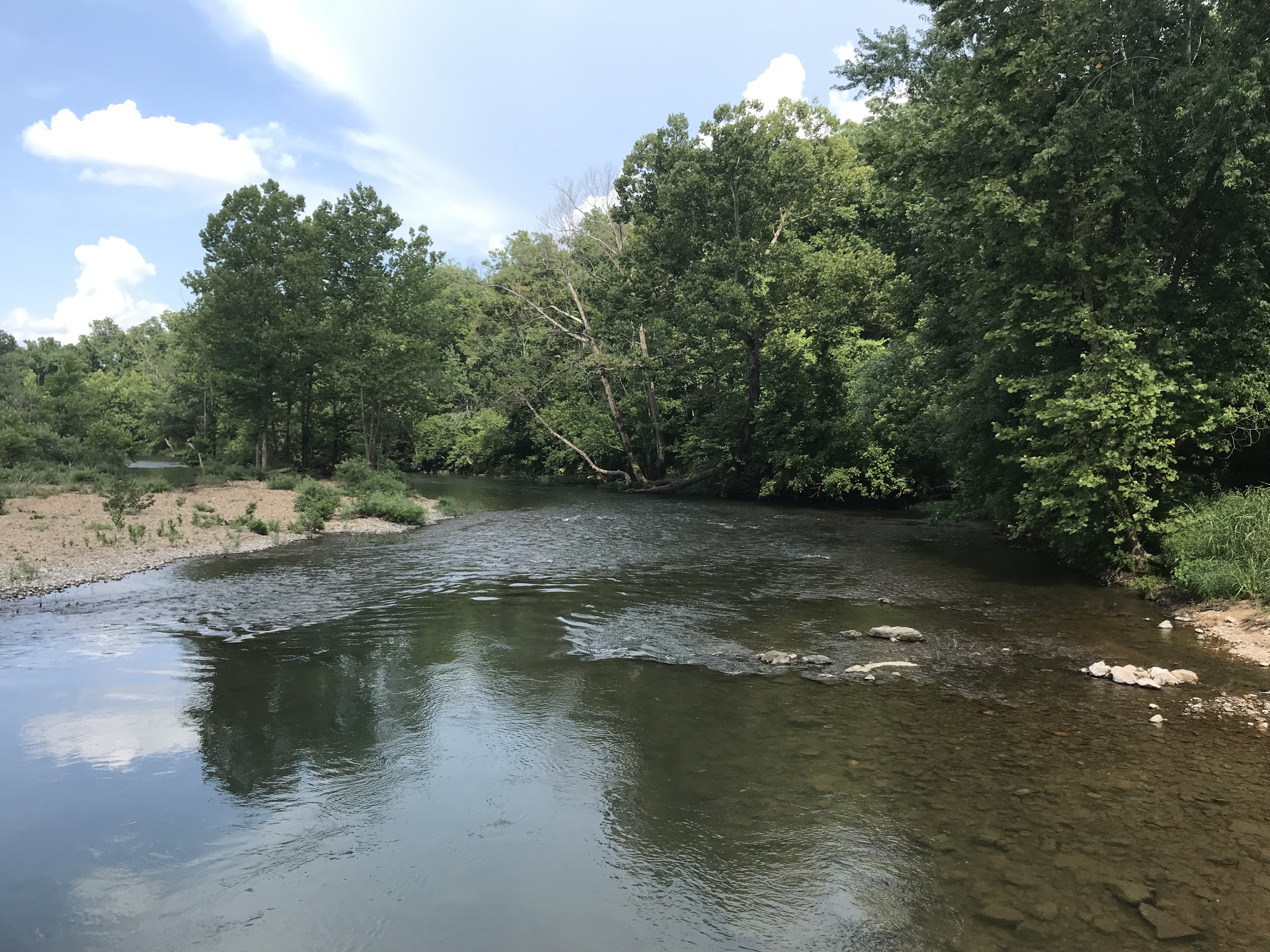
- South Fork at Kia Kima Scout Reservation

Location
- Country: United States
- States: Arkansas, Missouri
- Cities: Sturkie, Salem, Saddle, Cherokee Village, Hardy

Physical characteristics
- Source
  - location: Howell County, Missouri near South Fork, Missouri
  - coordinates: 36°40′36″N 91°56′55″W
- Mouth
  - location: Spring River Hardy, Arkansas
  - coordinates: 36°19′06″N 91°29′42″W
  - elevation: 354 ft (108 m)
- Length: 75 mi (121 km)
- Basin size: 93.8 mi^{2} (243 km^{2})
- Discharge
  - location: Saddle, Arkansas
  - average: 304 cu/ft. per sec.

Basin features
- River system: Spring River Tributaries Watershed
- Landmarks: Kia Kima Scout Reservation

The South Fork Spring River (commonly South Fork of the Spring River or simply South Fork River) is a tributary of the Spring River, roughly 75 mi (121 km) long, in southern Missouri and northern Arkansas in the United States. The river flows through the Salem Plateau of the Ozarks and it is part of the Spring River Tributaries Watershed.

The South Fork rises in Howell County northeast of the unincorporated community of South Fork and southwest of West Plains. The river flows generally southeast from Howell County through Fulton County before joining with the Spring River in Sharp County west of Hardy.
