= Chickasaw Council =

Local council of Boy Scouts

Chickasaw Council (#558)
- Owner: Boy Scouts of America
- Headquarters: Memphis, Tennessee
- Country: United States
- Founded: February 22, 1916
- Membership: 7,339 youth 4,135 adults (as of January 13, 2015)
- President: Danny Van Horn
- Council Commissioner: Randy Nelson
- Scout Executive: Casey Norwood
- Website chickasaw.org

The Chickasaw Council is a local council of the Boy Scouts of America that serves Scouts in Shelby County, Tennessee, as well as Crittenden county in eastern Arkansas and fifteen counties in northwest Mississippi. It was founded on February 22, 1916, to oversee the many Boy Scout troops already present in Memphis, Tennessee. The Chickasaw Council has two camps: Kia Kima Scout Reservation and Camp Currier. The Chickasaw Council is also home to the Order of the Arrow Ahoalan-Nachpikin Lodge 558. The council is divided into 6 districts; as well as the Exploring programs.

== History ==
Scouting came to Memphis in 1910 with the founding of Troop 1 by the YMCA at the newly constructed Central YMCA Building at 245 Madison Avenue. Several other troops formed including Troop 25 of Temple Israel, which is still in operation. For the first five years, Memphis area groups affiliated with either the Boy Scouts of America or the American Boy Scouts operated independently of each other. The local board was formed in 1915 which was then organized as the Chickasaw Council of the Boy Scouts of America on February 22, 1916, led by Council President Bolton Smith and Scout Executive Edward Everett.

During World War I the Boy Scouts of America undertook selling war bonds to help the effort and 30 Chickasaw troops took up the cause. Troop 22, led by its top salesman/scout Charles Wailes, sold the most in the country and was recognized by President Woodrow Wilson. Young Wailes' support for the war effort did not end with bond sales. He also helped to identify a potential spy ring working for the German Empire. As a radio-telegraphy hobbyist, Wailes frequently monitored railroad and Mississippi River riverboat radio Morse code signals with his shortwave radio set. In the spring of 1917, Wailes began to hear seemingly random characters being broadcast via a very clear signal. He also owned a portable station-finder and carried it around the streets of Memphis, attempting to locate the mysterious signal. After several attempts, Wailes believed he had pinpointed the signal's source at a home on Vance Avenue and notified his scoutmaster, who phoned the Memphis office of the Justice Department. A search of the residence uncovered a German-made shortwave radio in the attic. The purported radio operator (whose occupation was listed only as "traveler") was arrested.

The Chickasaw Council became a leader in racial integration in Scouting. Bolton Smith, the first Council President, became the Vice President of the National Boy Scouts of America and helped form the National Committee on Interracial Activities in 1926. When Gordon Morris became Scout Executive in 1928 (in that position from 1928 to 1959), he brought J.A. Beauchamp to Memphis to organize the first African-American Troop, Troop 100 at Centenary Methodist Church. Beauchamp was the first African-American Scouting professional and was later hired by the Council in 1934. By 1943 the Council was commended by the National Director of Interracial Activities for becoming the sixth Council in the nation with more than 1000 African-American Scouts.

The Delta Area Council of Mississippi merged into the Chickasaw Council in January 1993.

== Camps ==
=== Kia Kima Scout Reservation ===
Kia Kima Scout Reservation
- Totem: Thunderbird
- Location: Hardy, AR
- Coordinates: 36.34455°N 91.59223°W
- Founded: 1916
- Website http://www.kiakima.com/

Kia Kima Scout Reservation is a nationally accredited Boy Scout summer camp in the foothills of the Ozarks in Hardy, Arkansas. The name "Kia Kima" means "Nest of the Eagles" in the Zuni language. Summer camp at Kia Kima generally begins during the 2nd week of June and runs through the second week of July. A Cub and Webelos Resident Camp is generally offered during the first week in June. There is also a winter camp offered which starts after Christmas and lasts several days. The reservation is split into three camps: Camp Osage, Camp Cherokee, and Ozark Venture Base. The original 206.28-acre (0.8348 km2) property now known as "Old Kia Kima" was donated by Bolton Smith in 1916. The site is located on a bluff overlooking the South Fork Spring River, near Hardy (in present-day Cherokee Village). Old Kia Kima is listed on the Arkansas Register of Historic Places.

=== Camp Currier ===
Camp Currier
- Named For: Charles C. Currier
- Location: Eudora, MS
- Camp size: 300 acres (1.2 km^{2})
- Founded: 1925
- Ranger: Marc Brinkley

Camp Currier first opened in 1925 in Eudora, Mississippi. The camp was named for the late Charles C. Currier. Currier's wife, Elizabeth B. Currier donated the funds for the first payment on the property as well as the funds for the original swimming pool, original Mess Hall, and the dam. Elizabeth Currier was from Memphis and moved to Geneva, Switzerland in her later years. Camp Currier is a 300-acre (1.2 km^{2}) property owned and operated by the Chickasaw Council for many years. It was started as a full-year camping ground as opposed to Kia Kima which was only open during the summer. Beginning in 1940 and lasting into the 1950s Currier was used for the Chickasaw Council summer camp program due to its proximity to Memphis while Kia Kima was closed.

=== Camp Tallaha ===
Camp Tallaha
- Location: Charleston, MS
- Camp size: 165 acres (0.67 km^{2})
- Founded: 1925
- Defunct: 2002

The Delta Area Council opened Camp Tallaha in 1925. The camp had two artesian wells that were 3000 feet deep. After the Delta Area Council merged into the Chickasaw Council in 1993, Tallaha continued to operate as a second summer camp program in addition to Kia Kima Scout Reservation. The camp closed in 2002 and was sold in 2004.

== Order of the Arrow ==
Ahoalan-Nachpikin
- Name Translation: "We Who Love The Outdoors"
- Totem: Black Bear
- Location: Section E3
- Founded: January 1, 1995
- Membership: 300+
- Website http://www.chickasawoa.org

The Order of the Arrow is represented in Chickasaw Council by Ahoalan-Nachpikin Lodge No. 558 /ɒhoʊɒlɪn nɒtʃpɪkɪn/. This arm of Scouting's National Honor Society claims over 300 members and is one of the lodges in Section E3. Ahoalan-Nachpikin is composed of four primary officers, 6-7 Committee Chairman, and their respective advisers. Ahoalan-Nachpikin promotes and hosts such events as LOAC (Lodge Order of the Arrow Conference, similar to NOAC), Summer Odyssey (created by Dean Anderson), Fall Fellowship, and Induction Weekends.

=== History ===
==== Chickasah Lodge 406 ====
The Chickasaw Council first began its honor society as the Order of Kamp Kia Kima or Council Scouts. Every week at summer camp the campers who best exemplified the Scout Oath and Law were led to a secret campfire circle in the woods and given an Indian name. They would then meet periodically throughout the year. In 1948 the Chickasaw Council adopted the Order of the Arrow as a part of its camping program. Chickasah Lodge of the Order of the Arrow was founded at Kia Kima and held its first Ordeal Ceremony there on August 7, 1948, by a ceremonial team from Ittawamba Lodge 235 of the West Tennessee Area Council. It adopted the Thunderbird as its lodge totem as the thunderbird was already the emblem of Kia Kima. Chickasah held its first Brotherhood Ceremony in the Spring of 1950. It then held its first Vigil Ceremony on December 14, 1952, at Camp Currier. In 1994, the last Chickasah lodge chief was Ken Kimble.

==== Koi Hatachie Lodge 345 ====
Koi Hatachie was founded in 1946 by the Delta Area Council under the original name White Panther. The first Tap Out ceremony was at summer camp in July 1946 with the first meeting of the Lodge in December 1947. During Camp Tallaha's campfire programs, there was a legend of an old Choctaw Indian Chief and his constant companion, a white panther. After the Chief was killed, his white panther was said to continue to roam the land around the camp looking for his old master. The legend was so central to the camp that when the lodge was founded, the white panther was adopted as the totem and name. White Panther was used from 1946 to 1956 when the lodge changed its name to Koi Hatachie. Most Lodges had adopted Indian names and Lodge 345 wanted to conform. Koi Hatachie was thought to mean White Panther in the Choctaw language, however it was later realized to not actually have a meaning. In 1994, the last Koi Hatachie lodge chief was Thad Kelly.
