= Appanoose =

19th-century Meskwaki chief

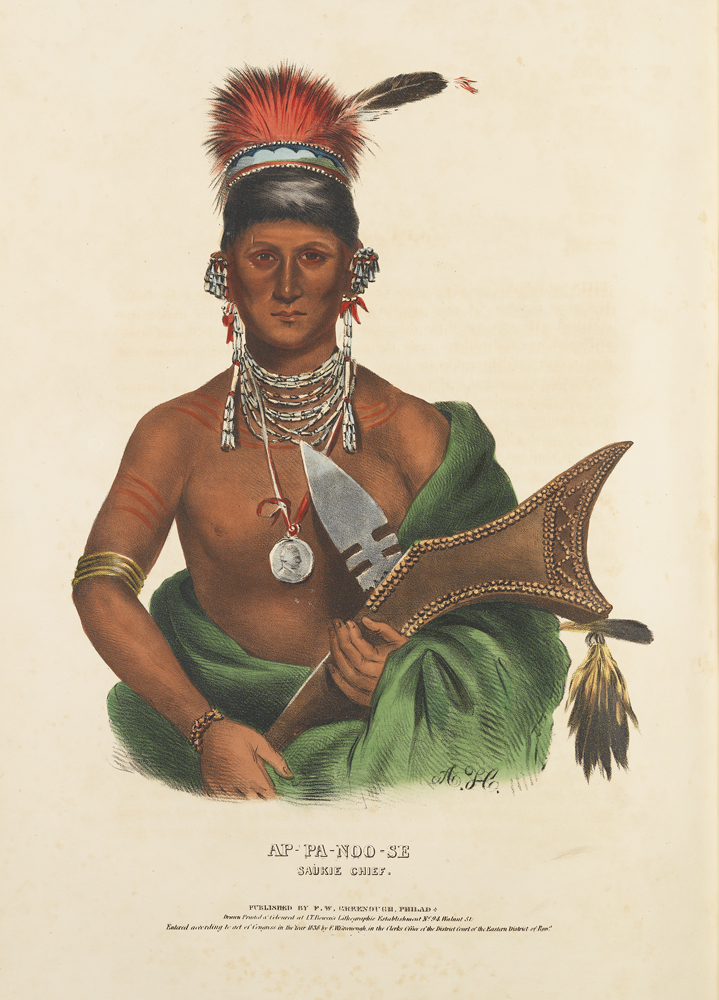
- Appanoose, after Charles Bird King ca. 1836
- Born: west of the Mississippi River
- Died: after 1843; Appanoose, present-day Kansas
- Resting place: Appanoose, Kansas (unmarked grave)
- Other names: Op-po-noos, Appan-oze-o-ke-mar, He Who Was a Chief When a Child
- Known for: Peace leadership, 1837 Washington delegation, Boston oration
- Parent: Taimah (father)
- Relatives: Quashquame (probable grandfather)

Appanoose (died after 1843), whose name translates roughly as "a chief when a child", was a 19th-century Meskwaki chief who lived in Iowa; he was the son of Taimah (Chief Tama) and probably a grandson of Quashquame. Prior to European-American settlement in the 19th century, the tribe occupied territory in what became Michigan, Wisconsin, Illinois and Iowa. He was notably the only leading chief of the combined Sac and Fox tribes said to have been born west of the Mississippi River.

Appanoose is remembered for keeping his people out of the Black Hawk War, for his speech at the Massachusetts statehouse during the 1837 delegation to Washington, and as one of the "money chiefs" to whom the United States paid treaty annuities. His name was given to Appanoose County, Iowa, and to several other places in Iowa and Kansas.

Several place names and a US Navy ship honored Appanoose:

- Appanoose County, Iowa
- Appanoose County Courthouse
- Appanoose County Community Railroad
- Appanoose Township, Franklin County, Kansas
- Appanoose Township, Hancock County, Illinois
- USS Appanoose (AK-226), a Crater class cargo ship

== Name and family ==
The name Appanoose, rendered in various colonial documents as Op-po-noos and Appan-oze-o-ke-mar, signifies "a chief when a child" in the Sauk language, reflecting that his rank was hereditary rather than won in war. He was the son of Taimah, known to American settlers as Chief Tama, a Fox leader whose village in 1820 stood on the site where the city of Burlington, Iowa was later built. He was probably a grandson of Quashquame, who had led one of the delegations to St. Louis that signed the contested land cession of 1804. Contemporary accounts described Appanoose as tall, well built, and intelligent.

== Leadership and the Black Hawk War ==
By the 1830s, Appanoose led a Sauk village on the Des Moines River near the site of present-day Ottumwa, Iowa. Like Wapello and Keokuk, he belonged to the peace party among the Sauk and Fox, and when Sauk war chief Black Hawk led his followers back across the Mississippi into Illinois in 1832, Appanoose kept his own band out of the fighting. After the Black Hawk War ended in American victory, he was compelled along with the other chiefs to cede tribal lands in eastern Iowa to the United States under the treaty of 1832, even though his people had taken no part in the war.

Following the cession, the Sauk and Meskwaki moved their villages to the Des Moines River valley. There Appanoose, along with Keokuk and Wapello, maintained a farm, and his holdings included part of what would become the city of Ottumwa. The United States government designated Keokuk as head chief of the combined Sac and Fox tribe after the war, giving the more numerous Sauk primacy over the Meskwaki in a political arrangement the tribes had not chosen for themselves.

As one of the treaty "money chiefs" along with Keokuk, Wapello, and Poweshiek, Appanoose received a share of the annuity payments the United States owed the tribe under successive land cession treaties. This gave him formal standing with U.S. officials, though it also placed him at the center of bitter disputes over how those payments were distributed.

== 1837 Washington delegation and Boston oration ==
In 1837, Appanoose traveled with Keokuk and a delegation of Sauk and Fox chiefs to Washington, D.C., where the group negotiated yet another land cession and met with President Martin Van Buren. On the return journey, the delegation toured several eastern cities. At the Massachusetts State House in Boston, Appanoose delivered what was widely reported at the time as the most animated speech of the entire visit. Speaking through an interpreter, he told the assembled audience:

You have heard just now what my chief has to say. All our chiefs and warriors are very much gratified by our visit to this town. Last Saturday they were invited to a great house, and now they are in the great council-house. They are very much pleased with so much attention. This we cannot reward you for now, but shall not forget it, and hope the Great Spirit will reward you for it. This is the place which our forefathers once inhabited. I have often heard my father and grandfather say they lived near the sea coast where the white man first came. As far as I can understand the language of the white people, it appears to me that the Americans have attained a very high rank among the white people. It is the same with us, though I say it myself. Where we live, beyond the Mississippi, I am respected by all people, and they consider me the tallest among them. I am happy that two great men meet and shake hands with each other.

As he finished, Appanoose extended his hand to Governor Edward Everett, and the audience broke into applause. A Boston newspaper account of the scene noted that the speech displayed "simple and manly" qualities the reporter considered characteristic of the delegation.

== Later life and death ==
Appanoose was described by contemporaries as a man who lived quietly, rarely straying far from his village, and who had four wives. He took part in the treaty of October 11, 1842, under which the Sauk and Fox ceded their remaining lands in Iowa to the United States. When the removal from Iowa began in 1843, he led his band west to the Sac and Fox reservation in present-day Kansas. He died there at some point after the removal, and was buried in an unmarked grave in the community that took his name, now the ghost town of Appanoose, Kansas. The exact date of his death is not recorded.

== Legacy ==
Appanoose County, Iowa, in southern Iowa, was named for him because his camp stood along a nearby stream during his years in Iowa. The county seat, Centerville, Iowa, holds an annual "Chief Appanoose Day" celebration in his memory. The Appanoose Rapids area of the Des Moines River also bears his name.

A portrait of Appanoose was painted during his 1837 visit to Washington and was later included among the lithographs in Thomas L. McKenney and James Hall's History of the Indian Tribes of North America (1836–1844).

The United States Navy cargo ship USS Appanoose (AK-226), commissioned in September 1944 and in service through November 1945, was named for Appanoose County, Iowa, which in turn honored the chief. The ship earned one battle star for service during World War II, including deployment to Leyte and a three-month assignment at Okinawa, where she survived repeated Japanese air attacks.
