= Keokuk's Reserve =

Coordinates: 41°17′N 91°17′W

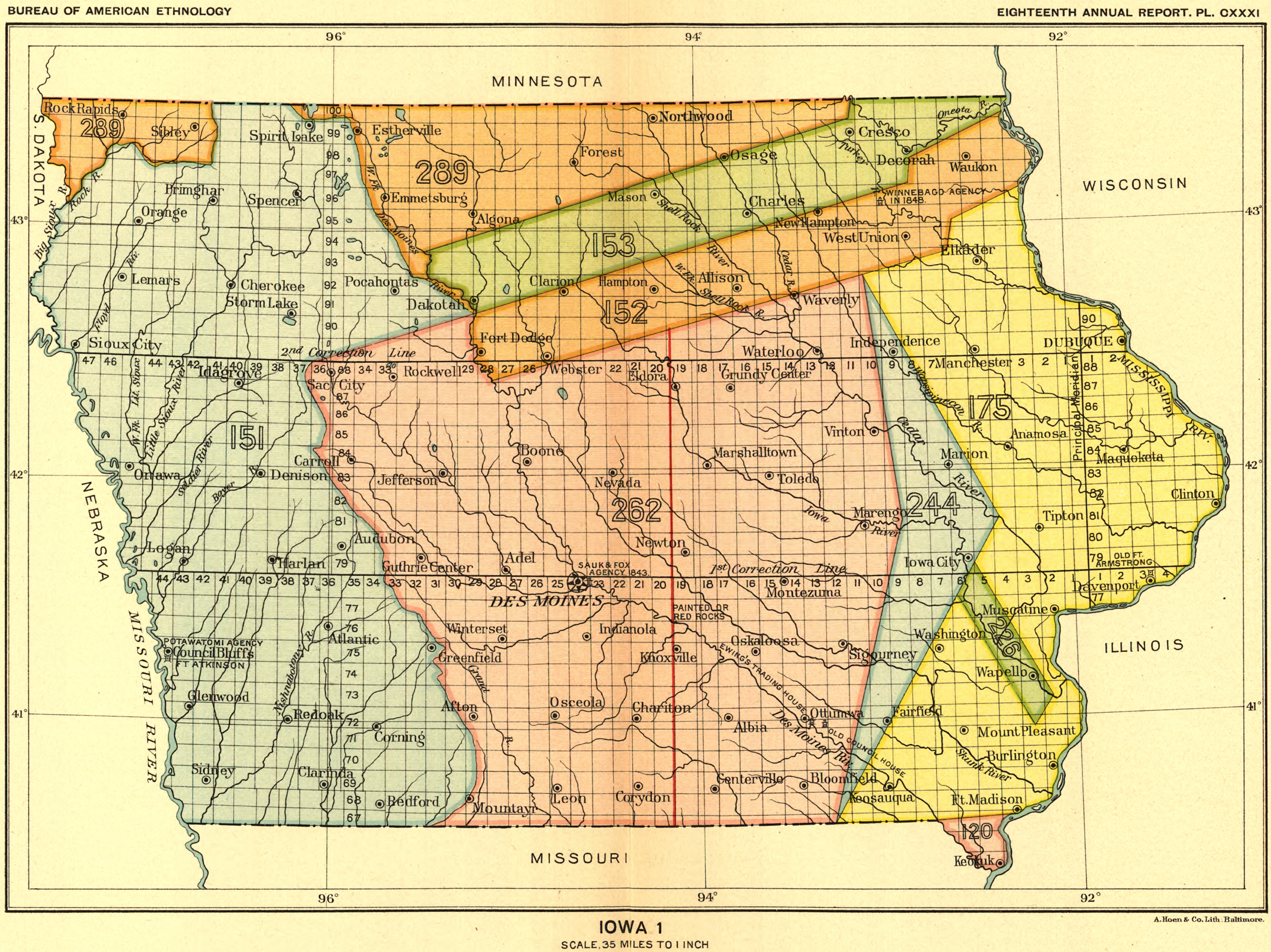
On this map of Iowa, Keokuk's Reserve is the green section within the Black Hawk Purchase, the larger yellow area on the right.

Keokuk's Reserve was a parcel of land in the present-day U.S. state of Iowa that was retained by the Sauk and Meskwaki tribes in 1832 in the aftermath of the Black Hawk War. It stretched within the area of the Black Hawk Purchase in Southeasterly direction from Iowa City and included Wapello, Iowa. The reservation was depleted of game and poor in resources. The tribes were forced onto Keokuk's Reservation, but stayed on the reservation only until 1836 when the land was ceded to the United States, and the Native Americans were moved to a new reservation along the Des Moines River.

== Treaty terms ==
The terms of the treaty that ended the Black Hawk War resulted in the United States' gaining a large section of present-day Iowa known as the Black Hawk Purchase. Keokuk's Reserve was carved out of this cession. The treaty stipulated that the reserve include Keokuk's Village, about twelve miles (19 km) from the Mississippi River, as well as equal portions of land on either side of the Iowa River.

The reserve was a 400-square-mile (1,000 km^{2}) area along either side of the Iowa River. The boundary crossed the Iowa River and extended to the southeast where it terminated beyond Keokuk's Village. The land surrounding the reserve was ceded to the United States by Fox and Sauk tribes as part of the Black Hawk Purchase.

== Life on the reservation ==
After the attrition of the Black Hawk War, the Sauk and Fox peoples were forced onto Keokuk's Reservation per the treaty they signed following the war. From the beginning, the reservation was depleted of game and poor in resources. Keokuk's leadership declined as he increasingly consumed alcohol.

Between 1833 and 1845 the Sauk and Fox population decreased more than 50 percent, to 20% of former levels, from more than 6,000 to about 1,200 from each tribe. The community continued to decline as alcohol gained a stronger hold among the peoples. Political discord also tore the groups apart.

== Cession to the United States ==
On September 28, 1836, a new treaty was signed which ceded all of the land within Keokuk's Reserve to the United States government. The treaty was signed near Davenport, Iowa and attended by Henry Dodge, and more than 1,000 chiefs and braves, including the aged Black Hawk, from the Sauk and Fox nations. The treaty text states that the reasoning behind the Sauk and Foxe's decision to cede the land was to "(obtain) additional means of support, and to pay their just creditors" according to the US government.

The result for the Sauk and Fox living within Keokuk's Reserve was that they were "removed" to another reservation along the Des Moines River. An Indian Agency was established on that reservation at the present-day location of Agency, Iowa. In addition, the treaty stipulated payment to Sauk and Fox of US$30,000 in June 1837 and $10,000 per year for ten succeeding years. The treaty also made other stipulations including a $1,000 payment to the widow of Felix St. Vrain and about $48,000 for the Sauk and Fox to settle their debts.

After their removal to the new reservation along the Des Moines, Joseph M. Street, agent to the Winnebago, was appointed agent to the Sauk and Fox. A farmhouse was erected as well as two mills; one of the mills was destroyed by flood but the other remained for several years. Keokuk and two other chiefs, Wapello and Appanoose, tended farm fields on the reservation. According to the 1882 History of Western Iowa, Its Settlement and Growth, much of the community began to suffer from "dissipation" (drunkenness), including Keokuk.
