= Archaeology and racism =

Racism in archaeology covers the phenomenon of interpreting archaeological remains in terms of speculations about the putative racial profiles of the peoples who created the structures which excavations have brought to light. Archaeologist Chris Gosden wrote "Racism occurs when judgements about people always proceed from their physical features of their body; when biology is given social force."

Such racial readings of archaeological remains have a history which may be traced back at least to Josiah Priest and his 1833 book American Antiquities.

== Great Zimbabwe ==
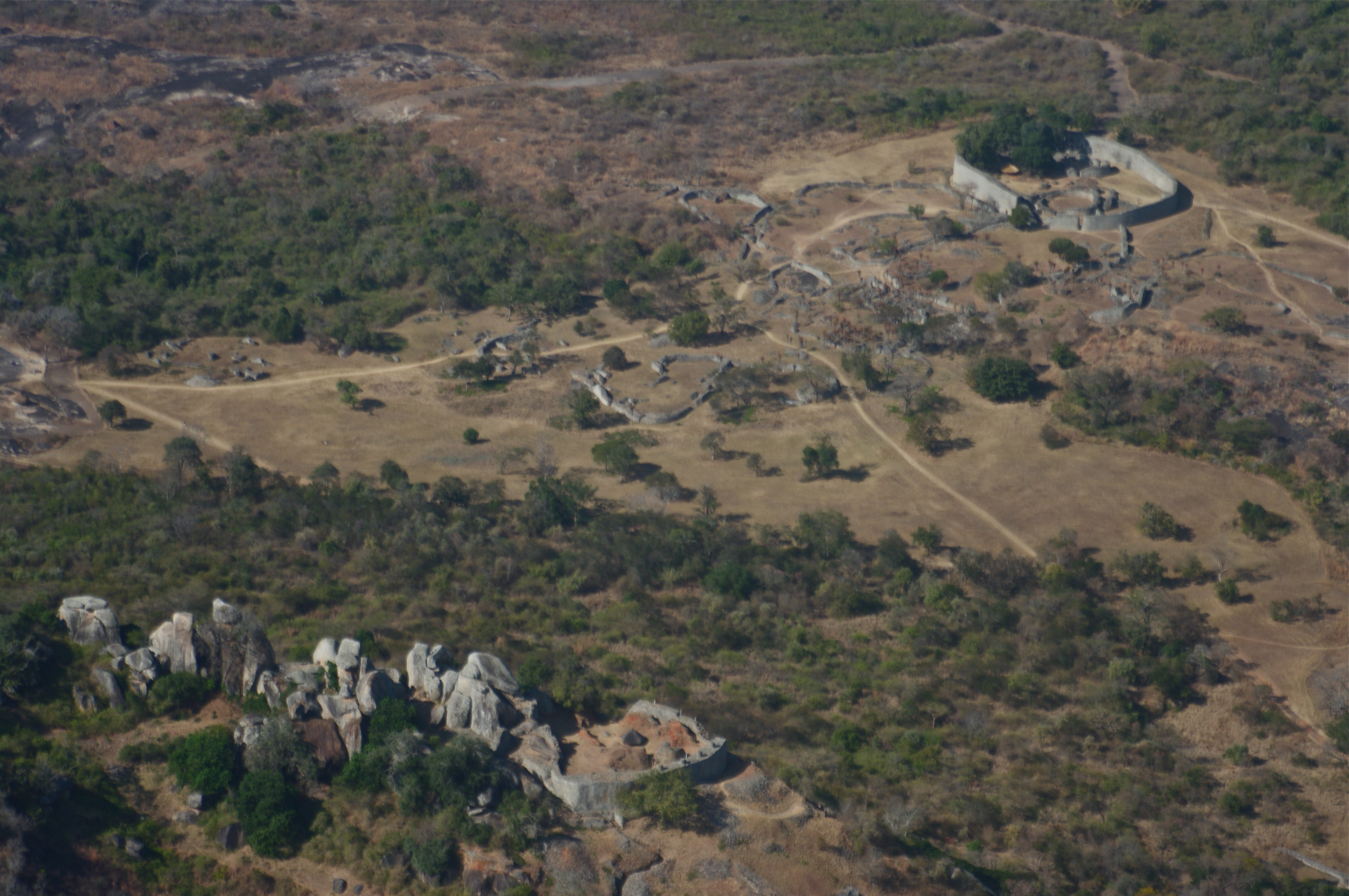
Aerial view looking southeast, Hill Complex in foreground

A prominent case study of racism in archaeology is the found in the history of analysis of Great Zimbabwe, a medieval city in the south-eastern hills of Zimbabwe near Lake Mutirikwi and the town of Masvingo. Construction on the city began in the 9th century and continued until it was abandoned in the 15th century. Today, it is thought to have been the capital of a little-known great kingdom during the country's Late Iron Age and the edifices are believed to have been erected by the ancestral Shona. Numerous foreign scholars previously attributed the city's advanced architecture to non-indigenous people due to racial prejudice.

In the mid-16th century, Portuguese historian João de Barros remarked with awe on the "marvellous grandeur" of these ruins, which far outstripped Portuguese attempts to build castles in Sofala. He did not believe any indigenous culture could have produced them, commenting:

To say how and by whom these buildings could have been made is an impossible thing, for the people of that land have no tradition of that sort of thing and no knowledge of letters: therefore they take it for the work of the devil, for when they compare it with other buildings they cannot believe man could have made it.

The first excavation to be carried out at the site was by J. Theodore Bent, who undertook a season at Zimbabwe with Cecil Rhodes's patronage and funding from the Royal Geographical Society and the British Association for the Advancement of Science. This and other excavations undertaken for Rhodes resulted in a book. Bent had no formal archaeological training, but had travelled very widely in Arabia, Greece and Asia Minor. He was aided by the expert cartographer and surveyor Robert M. W. Swan (1858–1904), who also visited and surveyed a host of related stone ruins nearby. Bent stated in the first edition of his book The Ruined Cities of Mashonaland (1892) that the ruins revealed either the Phoenicians or the Arabs as builders, and he favoured the possibility of great antiquity for the fortress. By the third edition of his book, published in 1902, he was more specific, with his primary theory being "a Semitic race and of Arabian origin" of "strongly commercial" traders living within a client African city.

The first scientific archaeological excavations at the site were undertaken by David Randall-MacIver for the British Association in 1905–1906. In Medieval Rhodesia, he rejected the claims made by Adam Render, Carl Peters and Karl Mauch, and instead wrote of the existence in the site of objects which were of Bantu origin. Randall-MacIver concluded that all available evidence led him to believe the Zimbabwe structures were constructed by the ancestors of the Shona people.

Other reports arguing for an African origin followed but were controversial, as the white government of Rhodesia pressured archaeologists to deny its construction by black Africans.

Later excavations yielded evidence indicating that Great Zimbabwe was constructed by local African communities rather than an external civilizing population. Stratigraphic studies linked metalwork, masonry, and ceramics to indigenous traditions and settlement patterns associated with early Shona ancestry. Research in the 1970s labeled the site as the economic and political center of a regional state that participated in long-distance trade, contradicting predominant Rhodesian claims that complex architecture required foreign influence. During the colonial period, officials attempted to suppress these findings by controlling excavations, resulting in fewer reports attributing the site's construction to indigenous African societies.

== Mound Builders ==
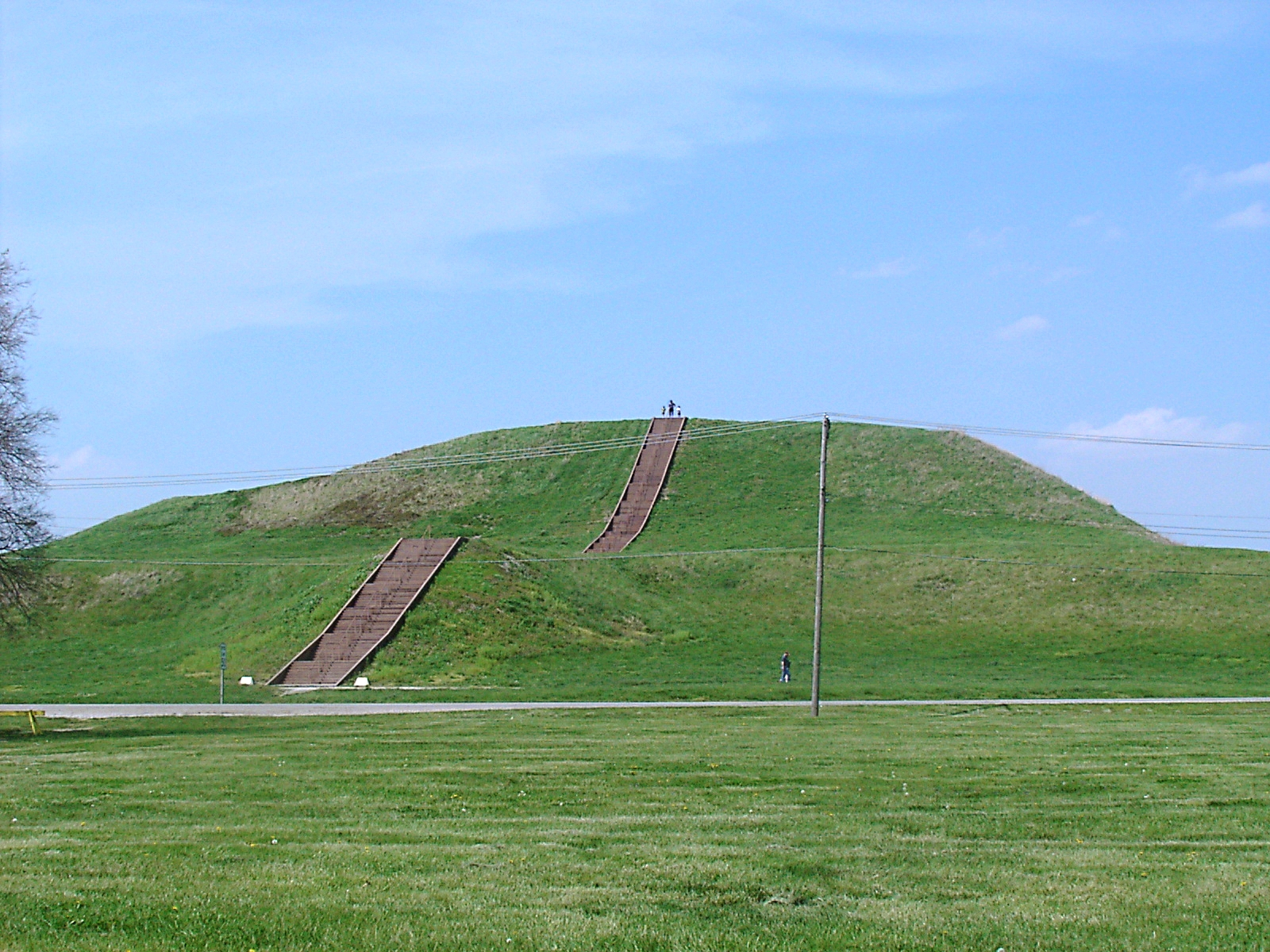
Monks Mound, built c. 950–1100 CE and located at the Cahokia Mounds UNESCO World Heritage Site near Collinsville, Illinois, is the largest pre-Columbian earthwork in America north of Mesoamerica.

The Mound Builders were members of various indigenous North American cultures who constructed earthwork mounds from roughly 3500 BCE (the construction of Watson Brake) to the 16th century CE. Geographically, the cultures were present in the region of the Great Lakes, the Ohio River Valley, and the Mississippi River valley and its tributary waters.

American settlers had visited and painted mounds since the 16th century, but it was Thomas Jefferson who in the 1780s undertook the first excavation of one. Near Monticello, Jefferson excavated a mound, digging a three foot deep strata trench in an effort to determine its purpose, something not attempted in America before. Having identified several layers of human remains and recalling memories of seeing a group of native Americans participating in a somewhat sorrowful ceremony at the site of a mound, Jefferson concluded that the mounds were relatively contemporary burial sites. Today, archaeologists have identified thirteen mounds in the Piedmont, Blue Ridge Mountains, and Shenandoah Valley region of central Virginia, including the mound described by Jefferson, all of which are burial mounds dating to the late prehistoric and early contact era (ca. 900-1700 CE). While his methods were precursors to modern archeological techniques, his conclusions were colored by his biases and his enforcement of forced assimilation of indigenous people into American society.

French and English travel writers and colonists during the 17th and 18th century, including William Bartram, wrote about and illustrated the mounds, accepting that they were likely built by Native Americans. In his book History of the American Indians, Irish historian James Adair acknowledged that they built the mounds, while arguing that they were descended from a "lost tribe of Israelites.

In the late 18th century, a myth emerged that a separate, now extinct race of Mound Builders unrelated to contemporary indigenous groups had created the mounds. Historian Nicholas Timmerman argues that, in tandem with the spirit of nationalism developing in the United States, "The Mound Builder theories posited an explanation for the mounds that allowed them to account for the often-elaborate constructions they encountered as the products of a “civilized” race that had been overrun by a “savage” one."

In 1820, American archaeologist Caleb Atwater published his investigation into mounds along the Ohio River. His report followed archaeological principles of field work such as dendrochronology and stratigraphy. Influenced by the work of Constantine Samuel Rafinesque and a merchant named John D. Clifford, Atwater argued the mounds were created by “a people far more civilized than our Indians, but far less so than Europeans” which he considered to be a lost race of Hindus.

In 1848, the fledgling Smithsonian Museum released its first publication, Ancient Monuments of the Mississippi Valley by Ephraim George Squier and Edwin Hamilton Davis, a major survey of sites according to apparent function, such as burial grounds, effigies, fortifications, and building foundations. It put forward what had become the common view of the time, that the Mound Builders were a more sophisticated race than 19th century Native American cultures. Suggested connections were to the Aztecs, Incans, Mayans or Egyptians.

In 1856, the Smithsonian published archaeologist Samuel Foster Haven's Archaeology of the United States, which accepted that the mounds were built by "the aborigines of the country.

The Bureau of American Ethnology published a study by Cyrus Thomas as its Annual Report of 1894. In it, Thomas, who had once thought that a vanished race had built the mounds, powerfully argued that ancestors of contemporary Native Americans were capable of building and had built the mounds. His work effectively ended the archaeological debate.

Today, the prevailing consensus among archaeologists is that the various cultures which built mounds are descendants of the original settlers of the Americas and ancestors of contemporary Native Americans. However, the idea a group not directly related to Native Americans living today may have built the mounds persists, with popular proponents including investigative journalist Graham Hancock On a January 2023 episode of Tucker Carlson's Fox Nation show "Tucker Carlson Today," geologist Randall Carlson promoted the theory, stating that "They didn't build 'em. Someone before them built 'em" and that there was "skeletal evidence of people who bear no genetic resemblance to the current Indians."

=== Josiah Priest and American Antiquities (1833) ===
Josiah Priest's 400-page publication American Antiquities centered around his study of the Bible and antiquarian journals, supplemented by information from his travels. After visiting earthworks in Ohio and New York, Priest concluded that these mounds could be traced back to a lost race that had inhabited America even before the Native Americans. This idea is now referred to as the "mound builder myth". The book grew in popularity because of Priest's views on Native Americans. "It tapped into the widely accepted view of those times that Native Americans were merely bloodthirsty savages, bent on the destruction of all but their own race. It was inconceivable to Priest and like-minded men that a race so lazy and inept could conceive and build such huge, elaborate structures." Priest speculated that the original dwellers could be the Ten Lost Tribes of Israel.

The reasoning Priest gives for his conclusion that there was an even earlier settler than the Native Americans relies upon his own interpretation of the Biblical flood story. According to Priest, after the great flood disappeared, Noah and his ark landed on America. While surveying the land, Noah also discovered mounds that had been constructed before the waters rose up. Upon seeing this, Noah questioned where these agricultural phenomena came from. "Surveying the various themes of mound builder origins, he could not decide whether the mounds were the work of Polynesians, Egyptians, Greeks, Romans, Israelites, Scandinavians, Welsh, Scotts, or Chinese, although he felt certain the Indians had not built them." Priest's racism has also been discussed in detail by author Robert Silverberg, archaeologist Stephen Williams, and author Jason Colavito.

== Flinders Petrie ==
Flinders Petrie worked closely with the scientific racists Francis Galton and Karl Pearson and over the years of his excavation career sent bones, skulls, and horses to their Anthropometric Laboratory at the University College London, forming personal relationships with both. Petrie's ideas on society were informed by their analyses of the biometric data. Historian Debbie Challis writes, "Petrie was a prestigious advocate of Galton's anthropometric data gathering and racial science in understanding ancient Egypt and archaeological evidence, as well as a backer of Galton’s eugenic vision in contemporary society." Petrie argued, based on skeletal remains and material culture changes, that the culture of ancient Egypt was derived from an invading Caucasoid "Dynastic Race," which had entered Egypt from Mesopotamia in late predynastic times, conquered the "inferior, exhausted mulatto" natives, and slowly introduced the higher Dynastic civilisation as it interbred with them. Dynastic race theory is no longer widely accepted, and Egyptian state formation is understood as a mainly indigenous process.

== Gustav Kossinna ==
Gustav Kossinna, a German archaeologist, used archaeology to promote the ideology that a prehistoric 'Fatherland', and a superior 'Aryan race', once existed in ancient Europe that extended beyond Germany into Poland and other areas, and that this territory should be reunified to restore the German state. Later his ideas were adopted by the Nazis, and Kossina's theories became official doctrine. Archaeology was heavily expanded in Nazi Germany, but those who disagreed with Kossinna's archaeology were removed from teaching positions. Kossinna's approach, and its association with the Nazis, had a long-lasting effect on European archaeologists, making them reluctant to investigate questions of race or ethnicity in archaeological contexts.

== See also ==
- Giant human skeletons
- Hyperdiffusionism
- Nationalism and archaeology
