= Black Hawk Purchase =

1832 land cession in Iowa

Coordinates: 41.9°N 90.4°W

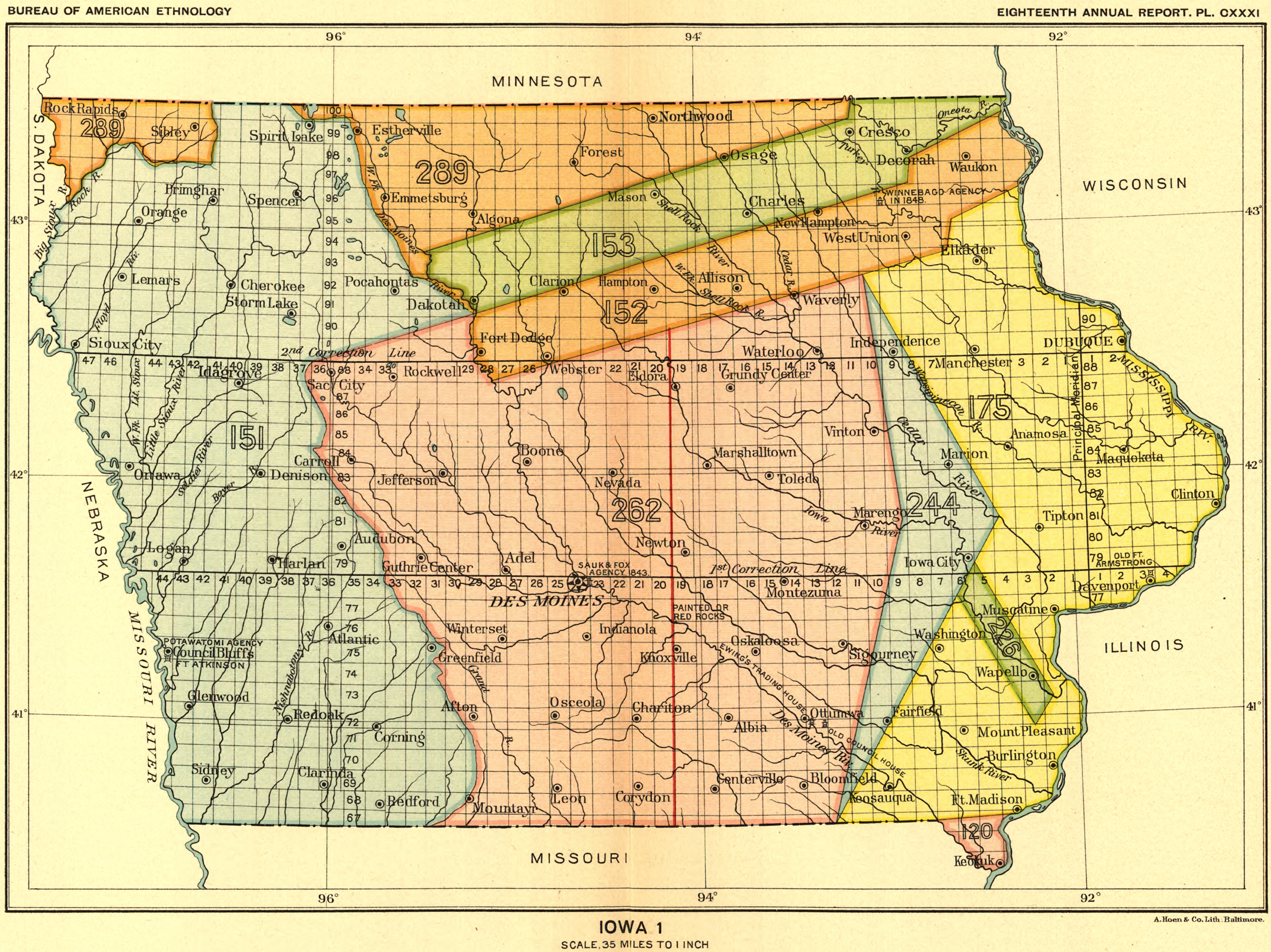
Map of Iowa, with the Black Hawk Purchase shown on the right, in yellow.

The Black Hawk Purchase, also known as the Forty-Mile Strip or Scott's Purchase, extended along the West side of the Mississippi River from the north boundary of Missouri North to the Upper Iowa River in the northeast corner of Iowa. It was fifty miles wide at the ends, and forty in the middle, and is sometimes called the "Forty-Mile Strip". The land, originally owned by the Sauk, Meskwaki (Fox), and Ho-Chunk (Winnebago) Native American peoples, was acquired by treaty following their defeat by the United States in the Black Hawk War. After being defeated the Sauk and Meskwaki were forced to relinquish another 6 million acres (9,400 sq mi; 24,000 km^{2}) and give up their rights to plant, hunt, or fish on the land. The purchase was made for $640,000 (equivalent to $20.64 million in 2025) on September 21, 1832, and was named for the chief Black Hawk, who was held prisoner at the time the purchase was completed. The Black Hawk Purchase contained an area of 6 million acres (9,400 sq mi; 24,000 km^{2}), and the price was equivalent to $0.11 per acre ($70/sq mi; $27/km^{2}). The region is bounded on the east by the Mississippi River and includes Dubuque, Fort Madison, and Davenport.

== About ==
The treaty was made by General Winfield Scott and the Governor of Illinois, John Reynolds, at what is now Davenport, Iowa, on the west bank of the Mississippi River. The agreement was ratified February 13, 1833, and officially went into effect on June 1, 1833, when the territory became the first section of what is now Iowa to be opened for settlement by non-Native Americans: United States citizens, or Europeans.

== Description ==
In "Treaty With the Sauk and Foxes, 1832", the land was described as follows: all the lands to which the said tribes have title, or claim, (with the exception of the reservation hereinafter made,) included within the following bounds, to wit: Beginning on the Mississippi River at a point where the Sauk and Meskwaki northern boundary line, as established by the second article of the Fourth Treaty of Prairie du Chien, July, 1830, strikes said river; thence up said boundary line to a point 50 miles [80 km] from the Mississippi measured on said line; thence in a right line to the nearest point on the Cedar River, of Iowa, 40 miles [60 km] from the Mississippi; thence in a right line to a point in the northern boundary of the State of Missouri, 50 miles [80 km] measured on said boundary from the Mississippi River; thence by the last mentioned boundary to the Mississippi River, and by the western shore of said river to the place of beginning."

According to The Making of Iowa (1900), "The Black Hawk Purchase extended along the west side of the Mississippi River from the north boundary of Missouri north to the Upper Iowa River. The Upper Iowa River is in the northeast corner of Iowa, and must not be confounded with the Iowa River in the southern half of the state. This is than where the tract extended from Missouri nearly to Minnesota. It was 50 miles [80 km] wide at the ends, and 40 in the middle."

According to The History of Jefferson County, Iowa (1879), "This was a strip of land on the west bank of the Mississippi River, the western boundary of which commenced at the southeast corner of the present county of Davis; thence to a point on Cedar River, near the northeast corner of Johnson County; thence northwest to the neutral grounds of the Winnebagoes; thence to the Mississippi to a point above Prairie du Chien..." Still another history describes it as extending from the Yellow River in the north to the Des Moines River in the south.

Two areas were held back as special awards; one was assigned to the chief Keokuk and his Sauk people in thanks for their neutrality (later known as Keokuk's Reserve); the other was given to "half-breed" translator Antoine LeClaire. (Note: LeClaire's reserve was different from the Half-Breed Tract, which was designated and set aside west of the Missouri River before the Black Hawk Purchase.)

The land of the purchase was successively governed by the legislatures of the Michigan Territory, the Wisconsin Territory, Iowa Territory and finally Iowa.

The Black Hawk Purchase was followed by the so-called Second Black Hawk Purchase (1837) and New Purchase (1842).

== See also ==
- Enos Lowe
