= Quashquame =

Sauk leader (c. 1764 – c . 1832)

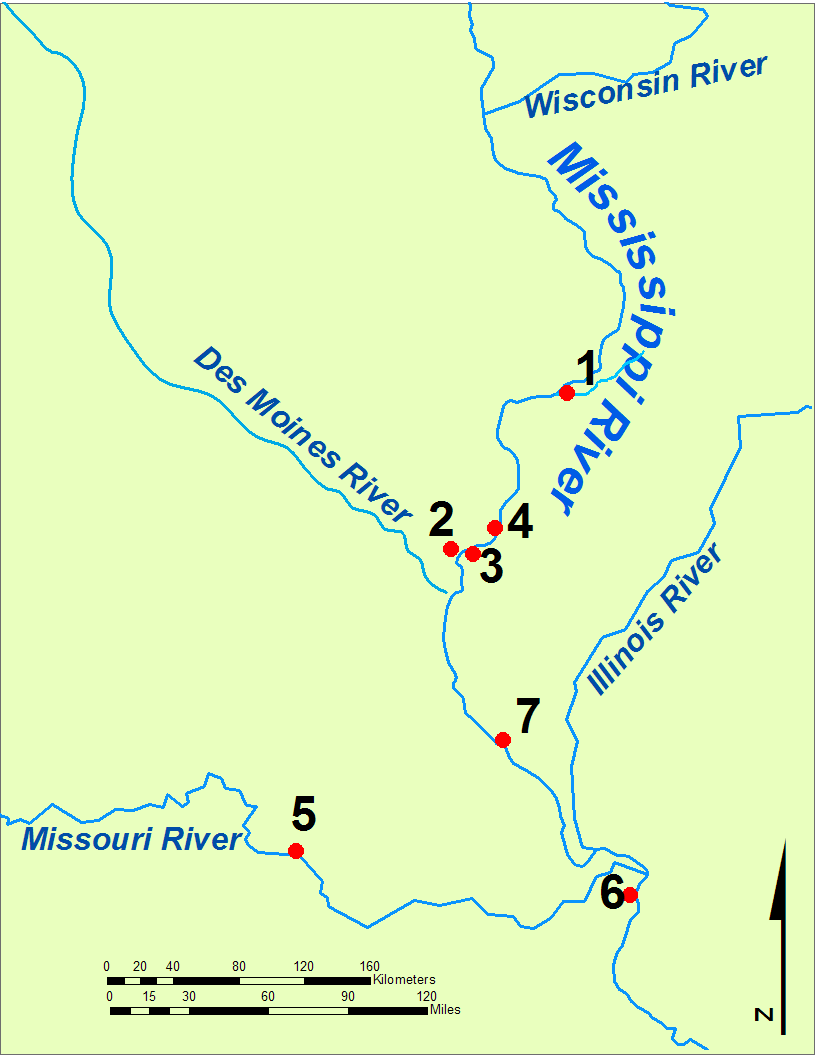
Map of important locations in Quashquame's life. 1: Saukenuk Village, 2: Montrose Village, 3. Nauvoo Village, 4. Fort Madison, 5. village near Rocheport, 6. Saint Louis, 7. burial site opposite Clarksville.

Quashquame (alt: "Quawsquawma, Quashquami, Quashquammee, Quash-Qua-Mie, Quash-kaume, Quash-quam-ma", meaning "Jumping Fish") (c. 1764 – c. 1832) was a Sauk chief; he was the principal signer of the 1804 treaty that ceded Sauk land to the United States government. He maintained two large villages of Sauk and Meskwaki in the early 19th century near the modern towns of Nauvoo, Illinois and Montrose, Iowa, and a village or camp in Cooper County, Missouri.

== 1804 Treaty of St. Louis ==
Quashquame is best known as the leader of the 1804 delegation to St. Louis that ceded lands in western Illinois and northeast Missouri to the U.S. government under the supervision of William Henry Harrison. This treaty was disputed, as the Sauk argued the delegation was not authorized to sign treaties, and the delegates did not understand what they were signing. A frequent visitor to Quashquame's village, Black Hawk lamented this treaty in his autobiography. The Sauk and Meskwaki delegation had been sent to negotiate the release of a murder suspect and to make amends for the killing, not to conduct land treaties. The treaty was a primary cause of Sauk displeasure with the U.S. government and caused many Sauk, including Black Hawk, to side with the British during the War of 1812.

One of our people killed an American, was taken prisoner and was confined in the prison at St. Louis for the offence. We held a council at our village to see what could be done for him, and determined that Quashquame, Pashepaho, Ouchequaka and Hashequarhiqua should go down to St. Louis, see our American father and do all they could to have our friend released by paying for the person killed, thus covering the blood and satisfying the relations of the murdered man. This being the only means with us for saving a person who had killed another, and we then thought it was the same way with the whites.

The party started with the good wishes of the whole nation, who had high hopes that the emissaries would accomplish the object of their mission. The prisoner's relatives blacked their faces and fasted, hoping the Great Spirit would take pity on them and return husband and father to their sorrowing wives and weeping children.

Quashquame and the party remained absent for a long time. They at length returned and encamped near the village, a short distance below it, and did not come up that day, nor did anyone approach their camp. They appeared to be dressed in fine coats and had medals. From these circumstances, we hoped they had brought good news. Early the next morning, the Council Lodge was crowded, Quashquame and party came up and gave us the following account of their mission:

On our arrival at St. Louis, we met our American father and explained our business to him, urging our friend's release. The American chief told us he wanted land. We agreed to give him some on the west side of the Mississippi, likewise more on the Illinois side opposite Jeffreon. When the business was arranged, we expected our friend to be released to come home with us. When we were ready to start, our brother was released from prison. He started and ran a short distance when he was SHOT DEAD!

This was all they could remember of what had been said and done. It subsequently appeared that they had been drunk the greater part of the time while at St. Louis.

This was all that the nation and I knew of the treaty of 1804. It has since been explained to me. I found by that treaty that all of the country east of the Mississippi, and south of Jeffreon, was ceded to the United States for one thousand dollars a year. I will leave it to the people of the United States to say whether our nation was properly represented in this treaty. Or did we receive fair compensation for the extent of the country ceded by these four individuals?

I could say much more about this treaty, but I will not at this time. It has been the origin of all our serious difficulties with the whites. [...]after questioning Quashquame about the sale of our lands, he assured me that he had never consented to the sale of our village.

— -Black Hawk (1833) Autobiography (1882 edition)

== Fort Madison and the War of 1812 ==
Zebulon Pike noted rumors that Quashquam led a large group of 500 Sauk, Meskwaki, and Ioway near the Missouri River west of St. Louis in 1806. This village might have been at Moniteau Creek in the southern part of Cooper County, Missouri, where he was later known to have a temporary village. Quashquame was back along the Mississippi by 1809. Quashquame attended several meetings with the U.S. Army at Fort Madison during the turbulent period leading up to the War of 1812. Quashquame and his band of Sauk remained neutral during the war.

In the Spring of 1809, several Sauk, possibly led by Black Hawk, attempted to storm Fort Madison. They were held at bay by the threat of cannon fire. The next day, Quashquame and two other Sauk leaders tried to restore relations with the United States Army, telling the commander, Alpha Kingsley, that the offending parties were acting on their own and had left the region. Kingsley demonstrated the might of the Army, firing a canister of shot from a six-pounder cannon. The Sauk were astonished and "put their hands to their mouths with an exclamation that that shot would have killed half of them."

Quashquamie attempted to placate Gen. William Clark during a meeting in 1810 or 1811 in St. Louis, telling Clark, "My father, I left my home to see my great-grandfather, the president of the United States, but as I cannot proceed to see him, I give you my hand as to himself. I have no father to whom I have paid any attention but you. I hope you will let me know if you hear anything, and I will do the same. I have been advised several times to raise the tomahawk. Since the last war, we have looked upon the Americans as friends, and I shall hold you fast by the hand. The Great Spirit has not put us on the earth to war with the whites. We have never struck a white man. If we go to war, it is with the red flesh. Other nations send belts among us and urge us to war. They say that if we do not, the Americans will encroach upon us and drive us off our lands." About 1810, Quashquamie maintained a camp or temporary village along Moniteau Creek in the southern part of Cooper County, Missouri, perhaps near Rocheport.

Quashquame was left in charge of the non-warrior members of the Sauk during the War of 1812. Black Hawk wrote: "... all the children, old men and women belonging to the warriors who had joined the British were left with them to provide for. A council had been called which agreed that Quashquame, the Lance, and other chiefs, with the old men, women and children, and others who chose to accompany them, should descend the Mississippi to St. Louis, and place themselves under the American chief stationed there. They accordingly went down to St. Louis, were received as the friendly band of our nation, were sent up to the Missouri and were provided for, while their friends were assisting the British!"

== Later treaties ==
Quashquame was a Sauk representative on several treaties after the war. In 1815, Quashquame was part of a large delegation that signed a treaty confirming a split between the Sauk along the Missouri River and the Sauk living along the Rock River at Saukenuk. The Rock River group of Sauk was commonly known as the British Band, which formed the core of Indians participating in the Black Hawk War. Among other treaties, in 1825, Quashquame signed the First Treaty of Prairie du Chien, which established boundaries between rival tribes.

== Villages ==
Quashquame maintained a village near what is now Nauvoo, Illinois, until it was combined with an older village on the west side of the Mississippi near Montrose, Iowa. While living at the eastern village, Quashquame helped mediate retribution for the murder of a Sauk by a white trader near Bear Creek in 1818. In 1824, Captain James White purchased the eastern village from Quashquame. White gave Quashquame "a little sku-ti-apo [liquor] and two thousand bushels of corn" for the land. Quashquame's village moved to the west bank of the river, merging with an existing Sauk village near what is now Montrose, Iowa. This western village was also called Cut Nose's Village, Wapello's Village, or the Lowest Sauk Village, and was located at the head of the Des Moines Rapids, a strategic bottleneck in Mississippi trade. Historical accounts suggest the village was occupied from the 1780s until the 1840s. This village was visited by Zebulon Pike in 1805 and in 1829 by Caleb Atwater.

== Atwater interview of 1829 ==
Caleb Atwater visited Quashquame in 1829. Atwater's interview provided the most detailed description of Quashquame and his village near Montrose and revealed that Quashquame was a skilled artist:

In company with Mr. Johnson, formerly an Indian trader under the old factory system, I visited Quasquawma's village of Fox Indians. This town was opposite our island, on the west bank of the river, & consists of perhaps forty or fifty persons. Landing from our canoe, we went to Quasquawma's wigwam and found him and several of his wives and children at home. These Indians had joined the United States during the late war. The wigwam we visited was a fair sample of all we saw afterwards, in the Indian Country, and was covered with white elm bark, fastened on the outside of upright posts fixed in the ground, by ropes made of barks, passed through the covering and tied on the inside, around the posts.

I should suppose that this dwelling was forty feet long and twenty wide– that six feet on each of the sides, within the doors, was occupied by the place where the family slept. Their beds consisted of a platform, raised four feet high from the earth, resting on poles, tied at that height to posts standing upright in the ground opposite each other, and touching the roof. On these poles so fastened to the posts were laid barks of trees, and upon these barks were laid blankets and the skins of deer, bears, bison, &c. These were the beds. Between these beds was an open space, perhaps six or eight feet in width, running the whole length of the wigwam. In this space fires were kindled in cold and wet weather, and here, at such times, the cooking was carried on, and the family warmed themselves, ate their food, &c. There was no chimney, and the smoke either passed through the roof or out the doors at the ends of the wigwam. On all the waters of the Upper Mississippi, no better dwelling is to be found among the Indians.– Quasquawma was reposing himself on his bed of state when we went into his palace, and the only person at work was one of his wives at the door, dressing a deer skin. He appears to be about 65 years of age, perhaps even older.

He appeared very friendly to Mr. Johnson, whom he knew well, and we had a long and interesting talk with him. We told him all our business, and asked for his advice and aid, which he cheerfully promised. From that time forward, he was of great use to us until the treaties were concluded. His son-in-law, one of the principal chiefs of the Foxes, was not at home then, and we did not see him until we arrived at Rock Island.

Quasquawma showed us where he had cut out on a bark, representing a steamboat, with everything belonging to it. This bark formed a part of his dwelling and was cut on the inner side. It appears that he had made three attempts before he succeeded in his wishes. He finally succeeded so perfectly that the cannon was going off, a dog was represented as sitting down near an officer of our army, with his chapeau de bras on, his epauletts were on his shoulders, and several privates were standing on the boat. Nothing could be more natural than this representation, which he felt quite proud of. We praised it greatly, which did not displease him. A few small patches of corn were growing nearby, but poorly fenced and badly tilled, among which the weeds stood between the hills of corn.

The chief went around his village and showed us whatever we wished to see until we requested him to take us back to our island in his canoe, ours having returned, which he politely did.

— Caleb Atwater (1829) Remarks Made of A Tour to Prairie du Chien: Thence to Washington City (published 1831, pp. 60–62)

== Personal ==
Atwater estimated Quashquame's age to be about 65, which means he may have been born about 1764. Quashquame was the father-in-law of famed Meskwaki chief Taimah (Tama). Because of his role in the disputed 1804 treaty, Quashquame was reduced from a principal leader of the Sauk to a minor chief. "Quasquawma was chief of this tribe once, but being cheated out of the mineral country, as the Indians allege, he was denigrated from his rank and his son-in-law Tiama elected in his stead."

Fulton provided this epitaph: "Qashquame died opposite Clarksville, Missouri, about the beginning of 1830. In person, he was short but heavily formed. He was not considered great intellectually and was regarded as deficient in the traits of a noble warrior. His influence among his people was limited, and his character not free from tarnish. Black Hawk did not hesitate to censure him in the most bitter terms for the part he took in the treaty of 1804." The 1830 date of death is not supported by historical accounts of Quashquame attending a conference at Fort Armstrong in the fall of 1831. An alternative account from the 1870s is that he died and was buried near Davenport, Iowa.
