= Keokuk (Sauk leader) =

Sauk leader

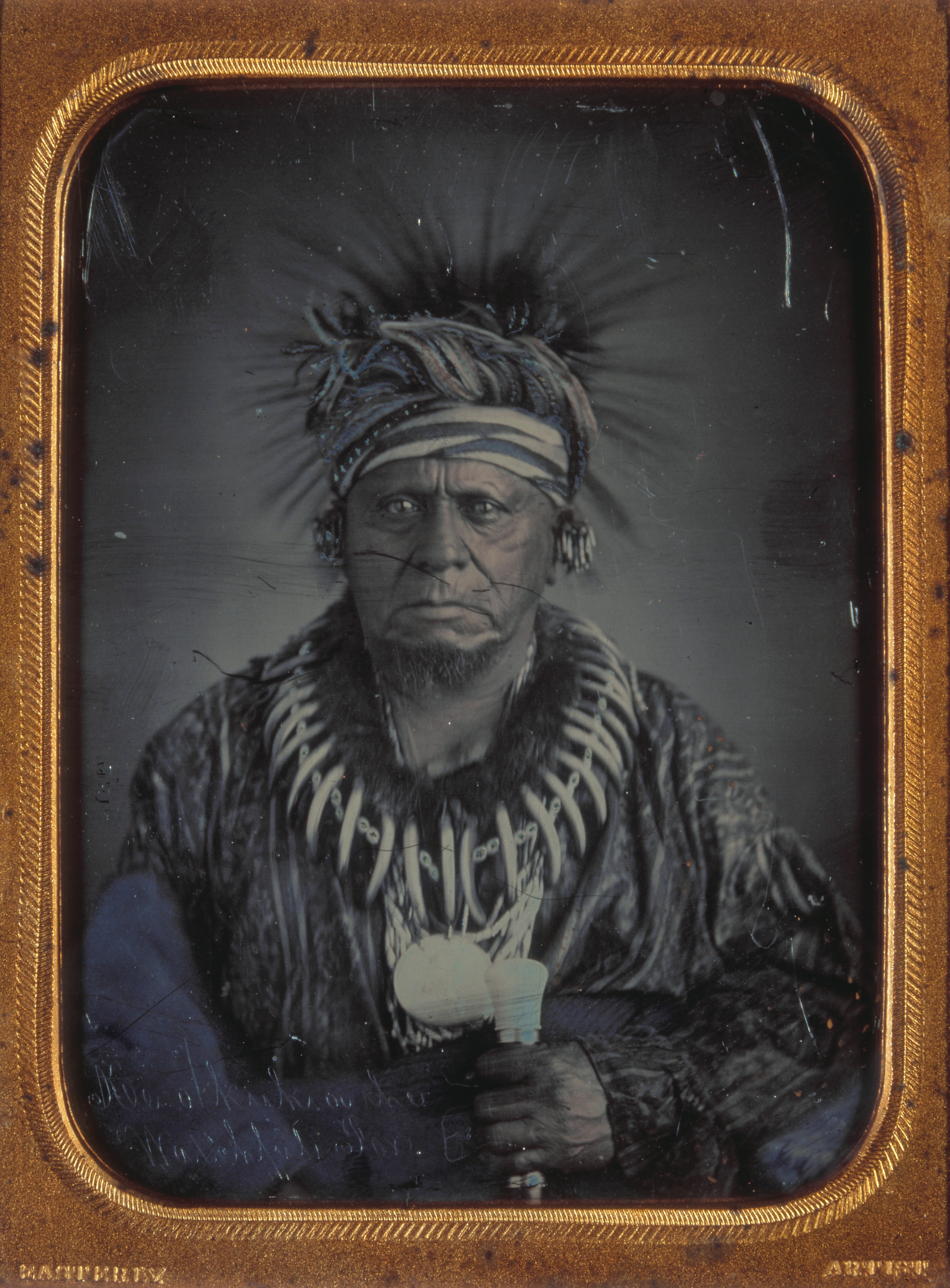
- Born: c. 1780; Illinois Territory
- Died: June 1848; Ottawa, Kansas
- Known for: Fourth Treaty of Prairie du Chien (1830), Black Hawk Purchase (1832)
- Spouse: No Kaw Quale Quale
- Children: Moses Keokuk Caroline Keokuk"Perrigo"

Keokuk (circa 1780 – June 1848) was a leader of the Sauk tribe in central North America, and for decades was one of the most recognized Native American leaders and noted for his accommodation with the U.S. government. Keokuk moved his tribe several times and always acted as an ardent friend of the Americans. His policies were contrary to fellow Sauk leader Black Hawk, who led part of their band to defeat in the Black Hawk War, was later returned by U.S. forces to Keokuk's custody, and who died a decade before Keokuk.

== Early and family life ==
Keokuk was born around 1780 on the Rock River in what soon became Illinois Territory to a Sauk warrior of the Fox clan and his wife of mixed lineage. He lived in a village near what became Peoria, Illinois on the Illinois River, and although not of the traditional ruling elite, was elected to the tribal council as a young man. He had a wife, who may be buried in Schuyler County, Missouri.

== Career ==
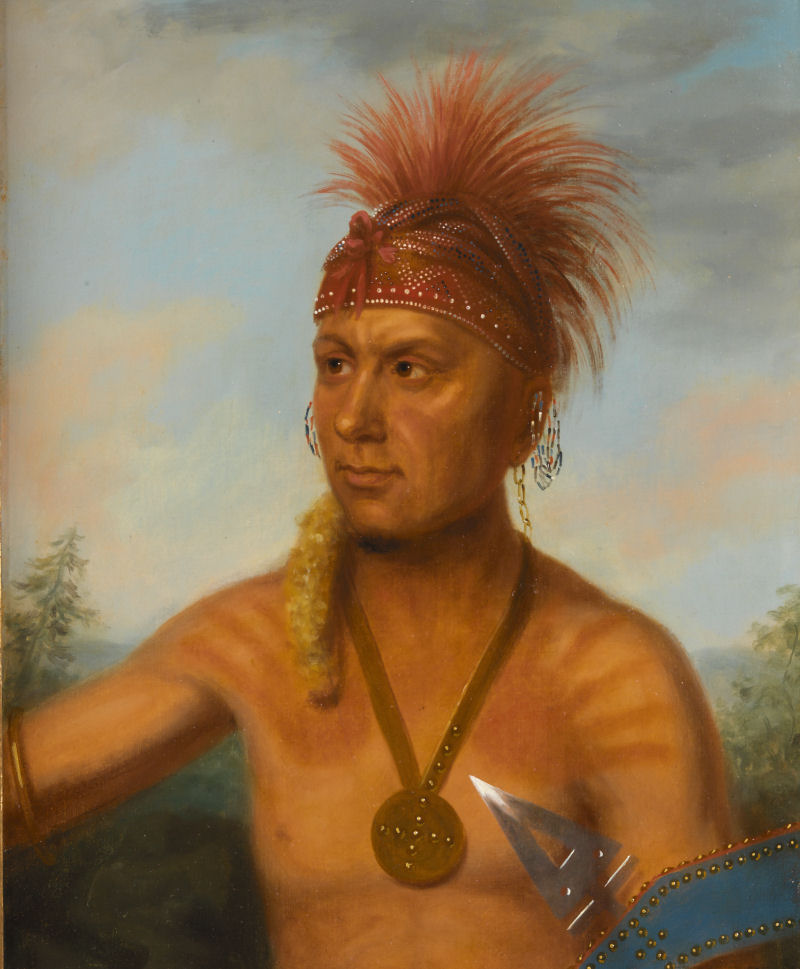
Keokuk in 1826

During the War of 1812, Keokuk convinced fellow tribal members not to leave their principal village, Saukenuk, and also not to fight for the British and war chief Black Hawk. However, many warriors had already left to do so, so Keokuk was also elected a war chief and successfully protected his village through oratory. In 1824, he visited Washington, D.C., with other Native American leaders, including Chief Wapello also of the Meskwaki people (sometimes called the Fox tribe).

Keokuk was noted for his personal bravery as well as oratorical skill. On several occasions, he persuaded tribal assemblies, although before he spoke every member but himself had been firmly determined to the contrary. At one time, in May 1832, Keokuk broke in upon a war dance that his band was holding preparatory to uniting with Black Hawk against the whites, and convinced the warriors in the heat of their fury that such would be suicidal and must not be undertaken. Keokuk moved his tribe across the Mississippi River to a site on the Iowa River by 1828, and the following year Caleb Atwater met him:

Keokuk, the principal warrior of the Sauks, is a shrewd politic man as well as a brave one and he possesses great weight of character in their national councils. He is a high minded, honorable man and never begs of the whites. While ascending the Mississippi to join us at the head of his brave troops, he met, arrested, and brought along with him to Fort Crawford two United States soldiers who were deserting from the garrison when he met them. I informed him that for this act he was entitled to a bounty in money, to which he proudly replied that he acted from motives of friendship towards the United States and would accept no money for it.

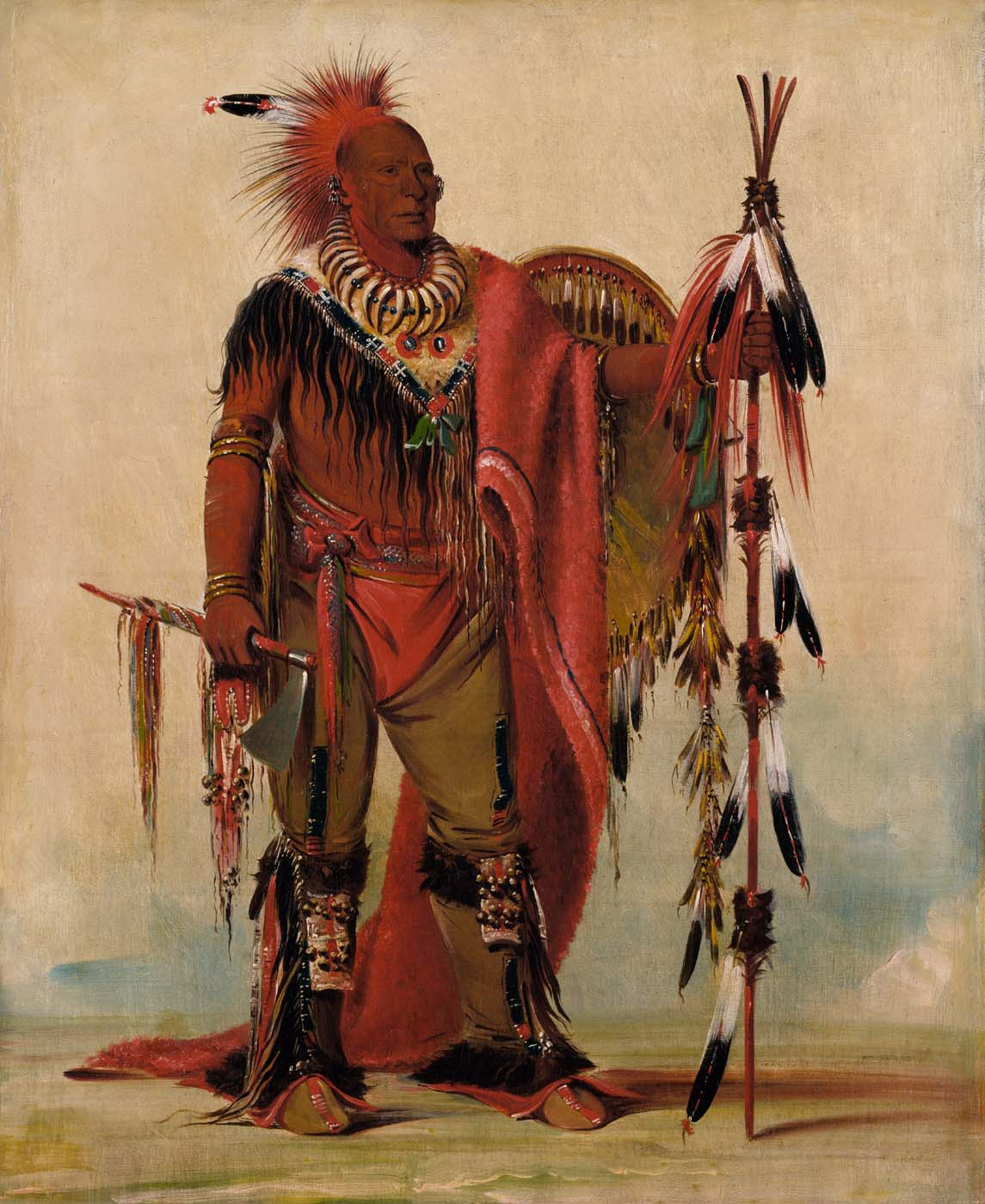
Chief Keokuk in 1835 by George Catlin

In July 1830, Keokuk was one of several native leaders who entered into the Fourth Treaty of Prairie du Chien with Indian Agent William Clark. This ceded territory including Saukenuk (Black Hawk's home village) to the United States (and white settlers). When Black Hawk returned from a foray (or attempted settlement in Iowa) and found white settlers in his ancestral village, he took up arms, and solicited general co-operation from his tribe. However, Keokuk succeeded in keeping the majority of the band at peace, and he became one of three "money chiefs" who distributed payments under this and other treaties. Keokuk took every opportunity to attempt to persuade Black Hawk to withdraw from his aggressive position before it was too late, but the U.S. Army and Illinois militia soon defeated Black Hawk's warriors. A four hundred square mile strip surrounding Keokuk's village in Iowa was exempted from the 1832 Black Hawk Purchase, a treaty which ended the war and which was negotiated at Fort Armstrong, Illinois (near Rock Island) in September 1832. In August 1833, U. S. authorities formally delivered Black Hawk (who had been taken as a captive to Washington, D.C., and eastern cities), to the custody of Keokuk, who had been officially recognized as the principal chief of the Sauks and Foxes in that treaty.

In 1837, with several of his nation's village chiefs, Keokuk visited Washington, where a peace was arranged between his people and their old-time adversaries, the Sioux. They also visited New York City, Boston, and Cincinnati, where Keokuk's speeches attracted attention. Black Hawk was with the party, as Keokuk feared leaving him to scheme during his own absence. Black Hawk died the following year. In August 1842, Keokuk and several tribal members (including wives), visited Nauvoo, Illinois, and he soon negotiated the sale of the tribe's land across the river in Iowa (his friend Chief Wapello having died in March). Thus, in 1845, despite the land reservation in the 1832 treaty, Keokuk's band was moved further west into Kansas.

== Death and legacy ==
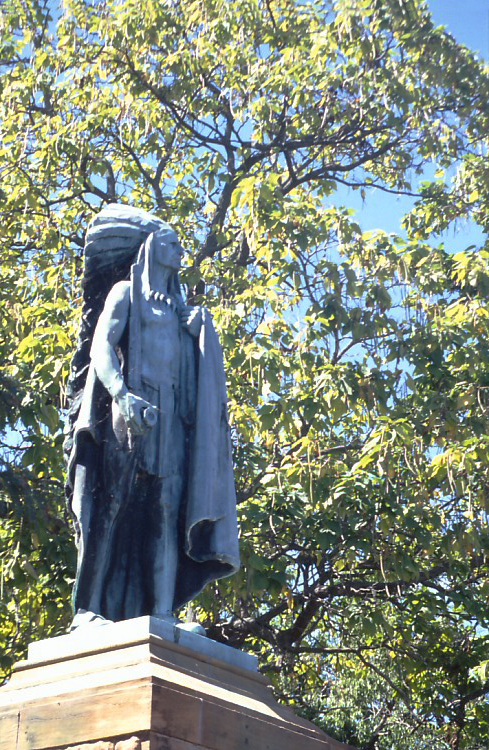
Keokuk Monument in Keokuk, Iowa by Nellie Walker

Keokuk and his people arrived at their new reservation near Ottawa, Kansas in 1845, and Keokuk there died in June 1848. Alternate sources describe the cause of his death as dysentery, alcoholism, or poison administered by a disaffected surviving member of the Black Hawk band who was soon executed. His son Moses Keokuk succeeded him as chief, and would later move the tribe to Oklahoma Territory.

Keokuk County, Iowa and the town of Keokuk, Iowa are named after him, although chief Keokuk had never visited the town before it was incorporated in 1834. Keokuk Street in Petaluma, California is also named after him. Pursuant to the efforts of Iowa judge Caleb Davis, a collector of Native American relics, Chief Keokuk was reburied in Keokuk in 1883, although modern forensics have determined that the remains thus interred were of a much younger man. The Chief Keokuk Statue, designed by Nellie Walker and erected in 1913, stands in Keokuk's Rand Park, as erected by the Keokuk chapter of the Daughters of the American Revolution.

In May 1832 Scottish traveller William Richard Grahame, facilitated by his acquaintance with Governor Coles of Illinois whom he had met on board a steamer, was able to observe two conferences between Governor Clark and Keokuk in St. Louis and records his impressions in his diary: "Keokuk, the fine looking man..., whom I spoke of yesterday, was the principal speaker.... They all spoke without embarrassment, and fluently, but I thought Keokuk was an orator. His countenance was really noble, intellectual and firm, occasionally relaxing with grace, and altogether commanding. ... He was five feet eleven, erect and stout, with a stately step and free. ... His voice was manly and full volumed as he spoke, and his utterance peculiarly distinct and rapid. His eyes and whole face were calm as he spoke, inspiring respect." ... Last evening Keokuk...went up the river in a steamboat. ... (he) had a long weapon...a spear...he...vociferated...His gestures and the tones of his voice were those of defiance and menace: to me it was a splendid piece of pantomime and rhapsody, but to his companions it appeared from the cheers to be a splendid piece of eloquence. ... I have been told that (Keokuk said that the Americans have been helpful and friendly to the Indians) and that by deeds as well as words he and his tribe would prove their gratitude to the Americans.... (The) interpreter tells me that Keokuk's speeches are more easily translated than those of any other of his tribe...that he is not rash, but is willing to take advice and consults.... In the last war he took the part of the British and killed four Americans with his own hand.... Keokuk is not a head chief having rank by inheritance, but a warrior chief which rank is attained by prowess. ... He has three sisters for wives and I was told he has a fourth from a different family. He is a prudent fellow and came over to the Americans before the war ended, when he saw the British losing ground."
