= Caleb Atwater =

American politician

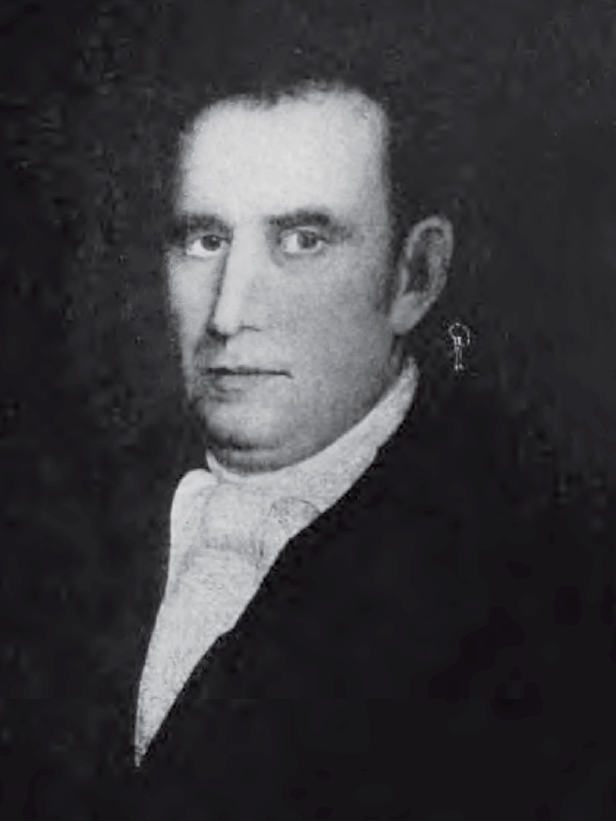
- Known for: History of the State of Ohio; study of earthworks in the Ohio Valley

Caleb Atwater (December 1778 – March 13, 1867) was an American politician, historian, and early archaeologist in the state of Ohio. He served several terms as a state politician and was appointed as United States postmaster of Circleville, Ohio. He was known best during the 19th century for his publication History of the State of Ohio (1838), the first book-length history of the new state. It also included much natural lore.

Atwater was recognized by contemporaries as a pioneer of the study of the mounds or massive earthworks in the Ohio Valley; he published an account during 1820. These are now known to have been constructed by ancient Native Americans of the United States. At the time, Atwater and other scholars developed various theories of origin; he thought a culture other than ancestors of Native Americans created such monuments. He helped publicize a theory by John D. Clifford, an amateur of Lexington, Kentucky, who suggested that people related to Hindus of India had migrated by sea and built the mounds, to be replaced by ancestors of contemporary Native Americans.

== Early years ==
Caleb Atwater was born in North Adams, Massachusetts during 1778 during the American Revolutionary War. He was the son of a carpenter and his wife, and educated at local schools. He graduated from Williams College in 1804. After failing as a schoolmaster in New York City, he studied theology and became a Presbyterian minister. His first wife Diana Lawrence died after the birth of their first child.

Dissatisfied with the ministry, the widower Atwater studied law, studying and working with a judge in Marcellus, New York. He was admitted to the state bar. Instead of practicing, he entered into business and soon became bankrupt.

As a result of this failure, during 1815 he moved with his new wife (Belinda Butler) to Circleville in Ohio, founded during 1810. They had nine children together.

== Career ==
Atwater practiced law for six years, and gained an assured income when appointed as United States postmaster of the town. He was elected to the state legislature during 1821. Circleville was developed at a site of circular earthworks built by the ancient Hopewell culture. Initially, it was planned with streets of concentric circles to fit into the remains of the monument. The county courthouse was erected in the center circle. During the late 1830s, people decided they wanted an ordinary town with a grid pattern, and the remnants of the circular works were destroyed.

Elected to the state’s house of representatives during 1821, Atwater endorsed internal improvements, including legislation that authorized the Ohio and Erie Canal. It was intended to improve the waterways for connection to the Erie Canal in New York State and thereby to the major market of New York City. Atwater promoted tax-funded public schools, equal education for boys and girls, and better teachers’ pay. After several terms, he was not re-elected during 1828.

An enthusiastic Jacksonian Democrat, Atwater was appointed by President Andrew Jackson during 1829 as one of three federal commissioners to negotiate the Third Treaty of Prairie du Chien with the Ho-Chunk in Wisconsin. His journey to the western frontier stimulated his interest in Native American issues and history, and he began to study them.

Atwater wrote and published books after this period. His journey to Wisconsin and meeting with Native Americans stimulated him to write about his experiences in the west: Remarks Made on a Tour to Prairie du Chien (1831), which includes an interview with the noted Sauk leader Quashquame.

A decade later he wrote An Essay on Education (1841), which contained his most mature thoughts on the subject.

During the nineteenth century, Atwater was known best for his publication History of the State of Ohio (1838), the first book-length history of the new state. Both Atwater's Tour to Prairie du Chien and his History contained much natural history lore as well as civil history. He also contributed articles on this topic to the American Journal of Science.

== Archaeological career ==
Atwater is known as one of the first researchers to undertake a serious study of the prehistoric Adena and Hopewell culture earthworks, and their associated artisan artifacts found throughout the Ohio Valley. He was fascinated by the ancient circular works found in Circleville, and studied others in the area. The Hopewell culture is now known to have flourished from BCE200 to CE500.

During 1820 Atwater published Description of the Antiquities Discovered in the State of Ohio and Other Western States, a 160-page report in the first volume of the Transactions of the American Antiquarian Society. This account, considered the first scientific treatment of the monuments, is illustrated with woodcuts of artifacts and with engraved maps of prehistoric sites. Included is one of Circleville (Plate v), where some earthworks had been plowed under, but the city's plan had been made to conform to Hopewell circles. This circular plan was later changed during the late 1830s, and all traces of the Hopewell works were destroyed.

Although the maps were stylized and likely not too accurate, they preserve all that is known today of some other prehistoric sites since destroyed by development. Atwater’s acquaintances contributed some of the maps and their descriptions in this book.

Additionally, Atwater speculated about who had built the elaborate, complex earthworks and what had happened to them. Contemporary Indians in the area did not have direct knowledge of the mounds’ origins. Americans tended to consider the Indian societies as primitive and did not believe the builders of the mounds could have been part of the same culture.

Atwater had learned that John D. Clifford, a Lexington, Kentucky merchant, and his naturalist friend C.S. Rafinesque, a polymath and professor at Transylvania University, were also working on these topics. Clifford found documentation in the university library and town archives from which he built a theory about builders of the earthworks. Rafinesque identified, measured and mapped many of these sites in the Ohio Valley and developed his own theories; his manuscripts contained identification of 148 sites in Kentucky, all of which were later featured in E. G. Squier and Davis in their 1848 work on the monuments.

Clifford published "Indian Antiquities,” eight long letters in Lexington’s short-lived Western Review and Miscellaneous Magazine (1819–1820), with material from Rafinesque. He proposed a theory, circulated more widely by Atwater, that the mounds were the work of ancient people related to the Hindus of India, who had reached North America by sea. He proposed that they had built the mounds and an elaborate culture but were driven south into Mexico by the more warlike Indians who followed them (and who became known to Europeans). He died soon after publishing this material.

Rafinesque had contributed to Clifford's letters, adding that the warring Indians were ancestors to such contemporary tribes as the Lenape. He theorized that the later Indian ancestors had crossed to North America over the frozen Bering Strait from Asia.

During 1819 Atwater published a memoir of his archaeological career to date in the journal Archaeologia Americana.

== Controversy ==
When a tepid and anonymous review of Atwater's 1820 work in the American Antiquarian Society’s Transactions appeared in the magazine Western Review, Atwater guessed correctly that Rafinesque was its author. He was angered by what he thought was unjustified criticism, and the two exchanged statements. Atwater’s adaptation of the Clifford thesis was promulgated in Europe when Vicomte François René de Chateaubriand appended a translation of Atwater’s report to his Voyage en Amérique et en Italie (1828).

== See also ==
- Archaeology and racism
- Atwater Township, Ohio

== Sources ==
- Boewe, Charles. 1987. “The Fall from Grace of that ‘Base Wretch’ Rafinesque,” Kentucky Review 7: 39-53.
- Boewe, Charles (Ed.). 2000. John D. Clifford’s Indian Antiquities; Related Material by C.S. Rafinesque. University of Tennessee Press, Knoxville, TN.
- Boewe, Charles. 2004. "C.S. Rafinesque and Ohio Valley Archaeology", Ancient America, No. 6. Center for Ancient American Studies, Barnardsville, NC.
- Johnson, Rossiter, ed. (1906). "Atwater, Caleb". The Biographical Dictionary of America. Vol. 1. Boston: American Biographical Society. p. 161.
- Martzolff, Clement L. (1905). "Caleb Atwater". Ohio Archaeological and Historical Publications. 14: 247–271.
- Wilson, J. G.; Fiske, J., eds. (1900). "Atwater, Caleb" . Appletons' Cyclopædia of American Biography. New York: D. Appleton.
  Ohio House of Representatives
  Preceded by John Barr; Samuel Lybrand	Representative from Pickaway and Hocking Counties; 1821–1822; Served alongside: Valentine Keffer	Succeeded by Valentine Keffer; Samuel Lybrand
