= Sac and Fox treaty of 1842 =

Native American–US cession treaty

New Purchase (1842)
- Signed: October 11, 1842
- Location: Agency, Iowa
- Parties: United States; Sauk; Meskwaki

The New Purchase of 1842 is a treaty between the United States and the Sauk and Meskwaki tribes, referred to as the Sac and Fox in the treaty. The Native American tribes ceded land in Iowa west of the Mississippi River and north of the Missouri border.

== Background ==
In the 1804 Treaty of St. Louis, the Sac and Meskwaki people relinquished their claim on ownership of lands east of the Mississippi and generally relocated to Iowa. In 1829, the federal government informed the two tribes that they must leave their villages in western Illinois and move across the Mississippi River into the Iowa region. The federal government claimed ownership of the Illinois land as a result of Quashquame's Treaty of 1804.

The move was made, but not without violence. Black Hawk, a highly respected Sauk leader, protested the move and in 1832 returned to reclaim the Illinois village of Saukenuk. For the next three months, the Illinois militia pursued Black Hawk and his band of approximately four hundred Indians northward along the eastern side of the Mississippi River. The Indians surrendered at the Bad Axe River in Wisconsin, their numbers having dwindled to about two hundred. This encounter is known as the Black Hawk War.

As punishment for their resistance, the federal government required the Sauk and Meskwaki to relinquish some of their land in eastern Iowa. This land, known as the Black Hawk Purchase, was a strip fifty miles wide lying along the Mississippi River, stretching from the Missouri border to approximately Fayette and Clayton Counties in Northeastern Iowa. In 1837, there were additional cessions by the Sauk and Meskwaki, called the "Second Black Hawk Purchase".

== Terms ==
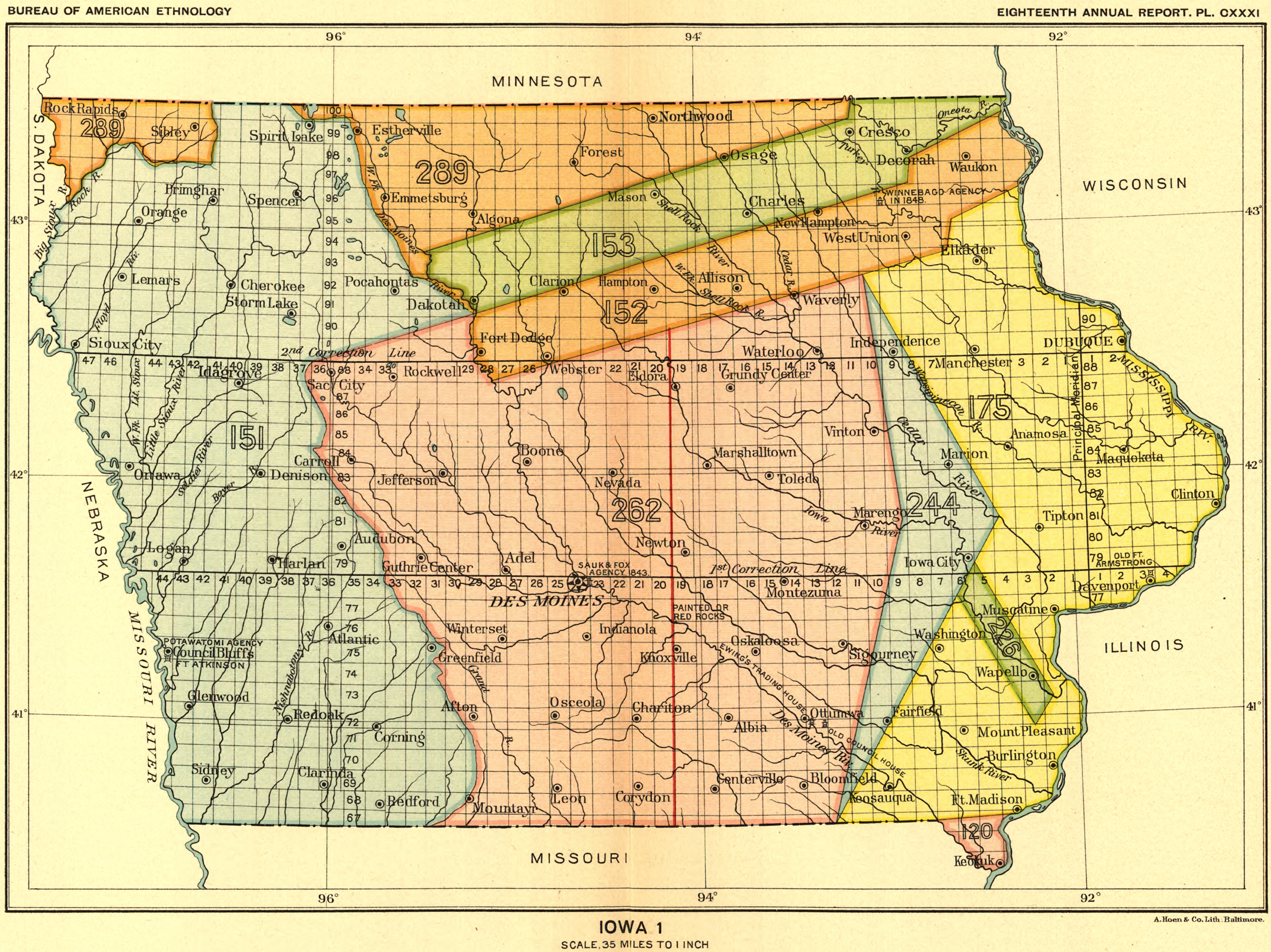
The area ceded by the tribes covers much of central and southern Iowa, numbered 262 on the map.

The treaty generally stipulated that the Sauk and Meskwaki people exchange land in Iowa for financial consideration from the US government. The Sauk and Meskwaki people agreed to relocate to what is now Kansas in 3 years time. The Native American people agreed to move west of the "Red Rock line," prior to May 1843 and exit Iowa completely by 1845.

=== Red Rock line ===
The treaty designated a line which the Native Americans would live to the west of during a transition phase while a permanent relocation site was selected in Kansas. The north–south line was delineated primarily by "painted or red rocks on the White Breast," river, near where it flows into the Des Moines River. The line was more fully delineated and marked in due time.

The city of Red Rock, Iowa was created just to the west of the line. The city and several of the landmarks denoting the line were, at least partially, submerged in 1962 by the creation of Lake Red Rock with the construction of Red Rock Dam. The treaty stipulated that border would be patrolled by the US military.

=== Financial considerations ===
In exchange for the concession of lands, the US government agreed to make an annual payment of $16,000 ("five percent of $800,000") and settle some outstanding debts of the Native American people worth $258,566.

=== Other considerations ===
The grave of Chief Wapello was enhanced with a tombstone matching that of United States Indian agent General Joseph M. Street, who he was buried next to by the Indian Agency.

The treaty also provided funds for General Street's widow, Eliza M. Street, the land and buildings of the (now unneeded) Indian Agency office.

== Signatories ==
The signing of the treaty occurred at the "Indian agency for the Sak and Fox," located in what is now the town of Agency, Iowa.

=== United States ===
The sole signatory on behalf of the United States was the Governor of the Iowa Territory, John Chambers. The treaty was witnessed by Indian agent John Beach and various interpreters and military staff. The treaty was ratified by the US Senate on February 15, 1843 and signed by President John Tyler on March 23, 1843.

=== Native Americans ===
The principal signatories were Keokuk, on behalf of the Sauk people, and Poweshiek, on behalf of the Meskwaki people. Other members of the governing structure and prominent military leaders also signed.

==== Sauk ====
- Keokuk
- Keokuk, jr.
- Wa ca cha
- Che kaw que
- Ka pon e ka
- Pa mekow art
- Appanoose
- Wa pe
- Wa sa men
- Wis ko pe
- As ke po ka won
- I o nah
- Wish e CO ma que
- Pash e pa ho
- Ka pe ko ma
- Tuk quos
- Wis CO sa
- Ka kon we na
- Na cote e we na
- Sho wa ke
- Mean ai to wa
- Muk e ne

==== Meskwaki ====
- Pow a shick
- Wa co sha she
- An au e wit
- Ka ka ke
- Ma wha why
- Ma che na ka me quat
- Ka ka ke mo
- Kish Ua naqua hok
- Pe a tau a quis
- Ma ne ni sit
- Mai con ne
- Pe she she mone
- Pe Shaw koa
- Puck aw koa
- Qua CO ho se
- Wa pa sha kon
- Kis ke kosh
- Ale mo ne qua
- Cha ko kow a
- Wah ke mo wa ta pa
- Muk qua gese
- Ko ko etch

== Aftermath ==
By 1845 nearly all had left Iowa. Similarly, other Native American groups gave up their Iowa land via treaties with the United States. Western Iowa was ceded by a group of tribes including the Missouri, Omaha, and Oto in 1830. The Ioway ceded the last of their Iowa lands in 1838. The Winnebago and Potawatomi, who had only a short time before been removed to Iowa, were yet again removed and had left Iowa by 1848 and 1846, respectively. The last remaining group, the Sioux, ceded their last Iowa land via an 1851 treaty with the United States, which they completed in 1852.

Following the removal of the Native Americans to Kansas, Iowa was admitted into the Union as a state in 1846. The new state capital of Iowa City was established in the area ceded under this treaty. Following the end of the transition period in 1846, US settlers were allowed to claim lands in the former Native American territory, like Mahaska County, Iowa and did so anxiously.

== See also ==
- Black Hawk War
