= Edgar Cunningham =

Edgar V. Cunningham, Sr.
- Born: December 11, 1910; New Orleans, Louisiana
- Died: February 27, 1980 (aged 69)

Edgar V. Cunningham, Sr. (December 11, 1910 – February 27, 1980) was an early youth member of the Boy Scouts of America who, for a number of years, was believed to be the first African American Eagle Scout. Cunningham married Susie Ann Rockett on September 14, 1931, in Galena, Illinois. They had five children, eighteen grandchildren and seventeen great-grandchildren.

== Background ==
Cunningham was born in New Orleans, Louisiana and was a member of Troop 12 in Waterloo, Iowa in what was then Wapsipinicon Area Council. Troop 12 was a "colored troop" formed in 1925 during the period when Scout units were segregated and, with Troop 9, was one of the two colored troops in Waterloo formed by James Lincoln Page. Cunningham was the first Scout in either of the Waterloo colored troops to earn Eagle Scout on June 8, 1926.

Cunningham received a hand-written letter from President Calvin Coolidge referring to him as the first black Eagle Scout, and his Scoutmaster, James Lincoln Page, received a presidential citation for guiding Cunningham through that process. After Cunningham died in 1980, the Winnebago Council (the successor to the Wapsipinicon Area Council) made inquiries to the National Council of the BSA to determine if he was indeed the first black Eagle Scout. Since Cunningham had earned Eagle Scout fourteen years after the first Eagle Scout was awarded and National did not track ethnicity, at that time there was no way to validate the claim.

In February 2020, it was discovered that Harry Cooper of the Kansas City Council, became an Eagle Scout in September 1920. In the Kansas City Council (now the Heart of America Council) newsletter dated 1920, Harry Cooper of Troop 92 was listed as a new Eagle Scout as of September. The newsletter lists him as the only African American Eagle Scout in Kansas City, one of only ten Eagle Scouts in Kansas City, Missouri at the time.

In March 2020, further research showed that the Eagle Scout court of honor for Hamilton Bradley of the Rome Council, was held on December 19, 1919, in Rome, New York. This makes Bradley the earliest known black Eagle Scout.

Dr. Frank "Tick" Coleman, who earned his Eagle in 1926 is one of the first four known African-American Eagle Scouts.

== See also ==
- Scouting in Iowa
- List of Eagle Scouts (Boy Scouts of America)
