= Linn County Council =

Linn County Council may be:

- Linn County Council (Iowa)
- Linn County Council (Oregon)
