= Howard H. Cherry Scout Reservation =

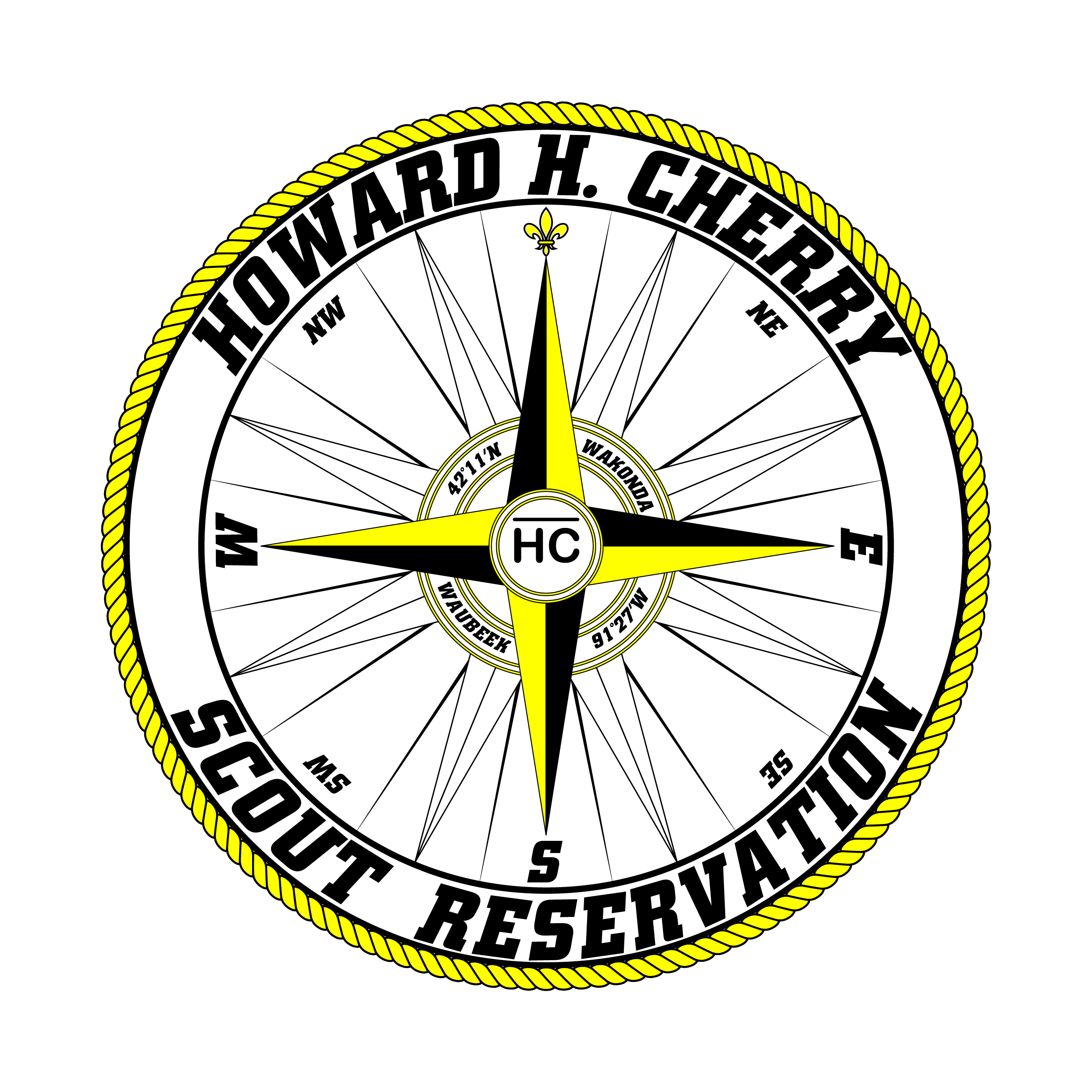
- Owner: Hawkeye Area Council
- Headquarters: Hawkeye Are Council Scout Office (Main), Troop Service Building (during the summer), ranger house (year round on-camp office)
- Location: Central City, Iowa
- Country: United States
- Coordinates: 42.189°N 91.461°W
- Founded: 1931 (Camp Waubeek), 1965 (Camp Wakonda)
- Founder: Howard H Cherry
- Website; Hawkeyebsa.org/camping/hhscr

Howard H. Cherry Scout Reservation is a Boy Scouts of America reservation in the Hawkeye Area Council near Waubeek, Iowa. The reservation was made up of two camps, Camp Waubeek and Camp Wakonda until the majority of Camp Waubeek was auctioned off on 27 April 2023 to raise funds to pay its portion of the BSA sexual abuse lawsuit. The reservation primarily serves the Hawkeye Area Council and the Winnebago Council.

== Camps ==
=== Camp Waubeek ===
Camp Waubeek was the originally used area within the reservation. The camp had been minimally used for some time. Some of the facilities include a dining hall, a medics quarters, and various other small shelters. During the summer, the camp was used for a week youth training program call NYLT. For the off season the camp is used for wildness survival training and other programs.

=== Camp Wakonda ===
Camp Wakonda is the currently used camp for most activities. Boy Scout, Cub Scout, and special camps are held in June–August every summer. The camp includes many large facilities.

==== Dakin Dining Hall ====
The Dakin Dining Hall is very large, and can hold up to 350 people at a time. The Dining Hall also has a large kitchen and food storage area. An addition to the Dining Hall is the Blankenship Medical Pavilion, which added three rooms for medicinal purposes, and a large storage room for tables and chairs.
