= Quincy Council =

Quincy Council may be:

- Quincy Area Council or Mississippi Valley Council, a Boy Scout council headquartered in Quincy, Illinois
- Quincy Council (Massachusetts) or Boston Minuteman Council, a Boy Scout council headquartered in Milton, Massachusetts
