= Chief Wapello's Memorial Park =

Historic site in Iowa, United States

- U.S. National Register of Historic Places
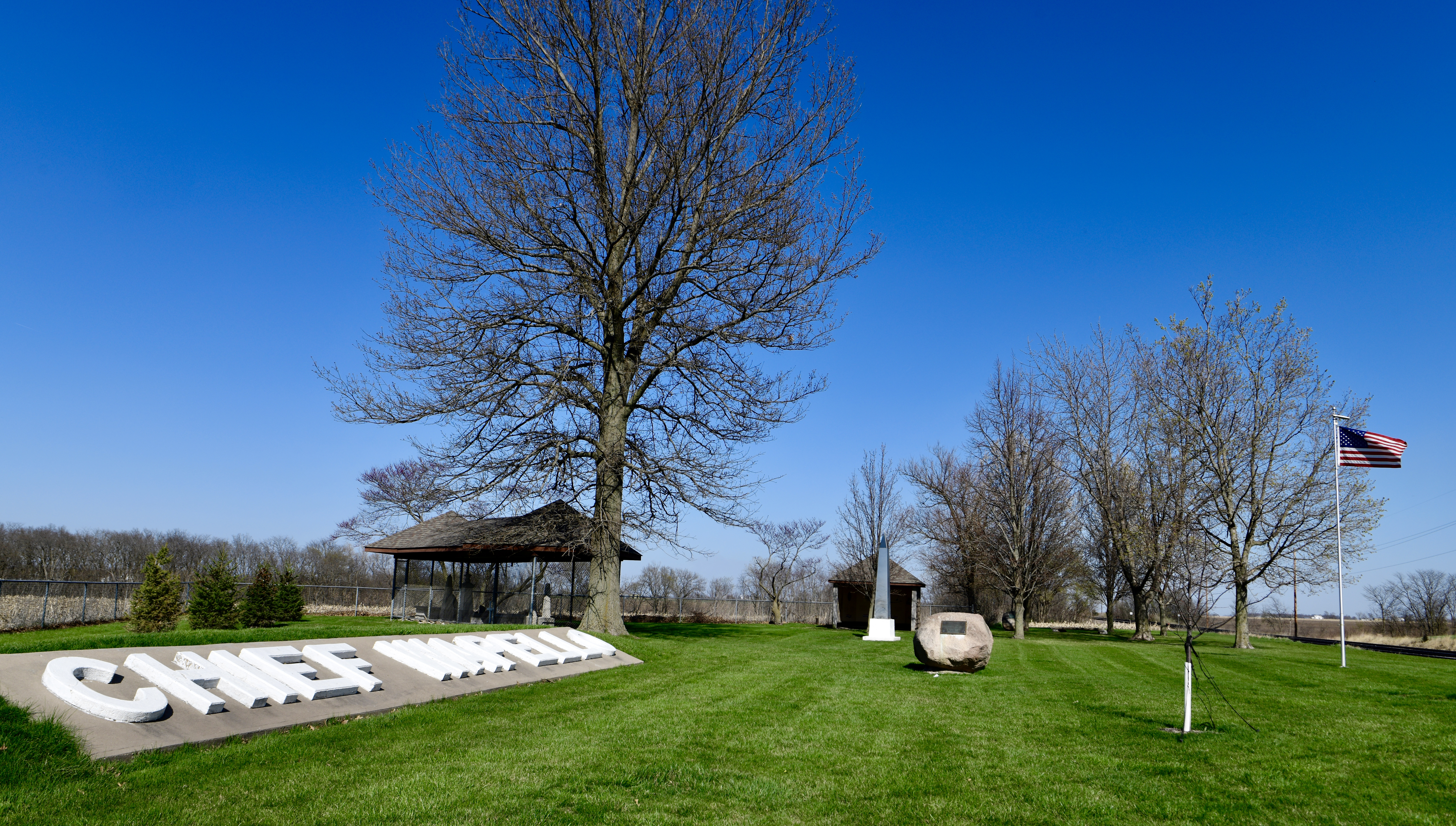

- Location within Iowa Location within the United States
- Location: Southeast of Agency, Iowa off U.S. Route 34
- Coordinates: 40°59′30.4″N 92°17′33.5″W
- Area: less than one acre
- NRHP reference No.: 75000700
- Added to NRHP: March 27, 1975

Chief Wapello's Memorial Park, also known as Chief Wapello's Gravesite and the Site of Sac and Fox Indian Agency, is a historic site located near Agency, Iowa, United States. The property was listed on the National Register of Historic Places in 1975. The park is on the site of the Indian Agency that became the home of the Sauk and Meskwaki (Fox) tribes. They were relocated here by the United States government after the Black Hawk War of 1832. General Joseph M. Street was appointed the Indian Agent and settled with his family on the agency. He earned the respect of the Meskwaki chief Wapello. A stone marker marks the site of the Agency House. Another stone marker commemorates the 1842 negotiations for the tribes to hand over their Iowa lands to the United States government, and the first Christian services that were held in Iowa's interior by the Reverend Thomas Kirkpatrick, a Methodist Circuit Rider, in 1838. The tribes were relocated from here to Kansas.

This land was the agency's garden area. When Street died in 1840 he was buried at this location on the agency and the tribes gave the property that surrounds the grave to his wife so she and her family could make a living. Two years later Wapello was buried next to General Street. Other graves include those of Eliza Street and their children and Major John Beach who was the Street's son-in-law and who replaced General Street as Indian Agent. The Chicago, Burlington and Quincy Railroad was granted an easement on the south side of the park by the Street family with the stipulation that they take care of it. This they have done and the stainless steel marker in the park was installed by the railroad.
