= New Purchase =

New Purchase can refer to any of several territories ceded by Native American tribes to Great Britain or the United States.

- New Purchase (1768) is the territory in Pennsylvania ceded by the Iroquois Confederacy to Great Britain by the Treaty of Fort Stanwix.
- New Purchase (1818) is the territory in Indiana ceded by the Miami, Delaware, Wyandot and others to the United States by one of the Treaties of St. Mary's.
- New Purchase (1820) is the territory of Mississippi ceded by Choctaw under the Treaty of Doak's Stand, also known as the Second Choctaw Cession
- New Purchase (1842) is the territory in Iowa ceded by the Sauk and Meskwaki to the United States via the Sac and Fox treaty of 1842
