= Camp Eagle (disambiguation) =

Camp Eagle was a U.S. military base in Bosnia and Herzegovina.

Camp Eagle may also refer to:

- Camp Eagle (Vietnam), a former U.S. military base in Vietnam
- Camp Eagle Island, a summer camp in New York
- Camp Eagle (Nebraska), a Boy Scout camp in Nebraska
