= John Beach =

US Army officer and Indian Agent (1812–1874)

- Born: January 1, 1812; Massachusetts, United States
- Died: August 31, 1874 (aged 62); Agency City, Iowa
- Burial place: Chief Wapello's Memorial Park, Wapello County, Iowa
- Military career
- Allegiance: United States of America; Union
- Branch: United States Army; Union Army
- Service years: 1828–1838; 1861–1866
- Rank: Major
- Unit: 1st Infantry Regiment
- Conflicts: Black Hawk War; American Civil War
- Other work: Farmer, merchant, writer

Major John Beach (January 1, 1812 – August 31, 1874) was a United States Army officer during the Black Hawk and American Civil War. He was the last U.S. Indian Agent to the Sac and Fox tribes. A son-in-law to General Joseph Street, Beach succeeded him as agent to the Sac and Fox upon Street's death, and he eventually hosted the week-long council that resulted in the signing of the 1842 treaty for the purchase of much of Iowa from the Sac and Fox Indians.

== Biography ==
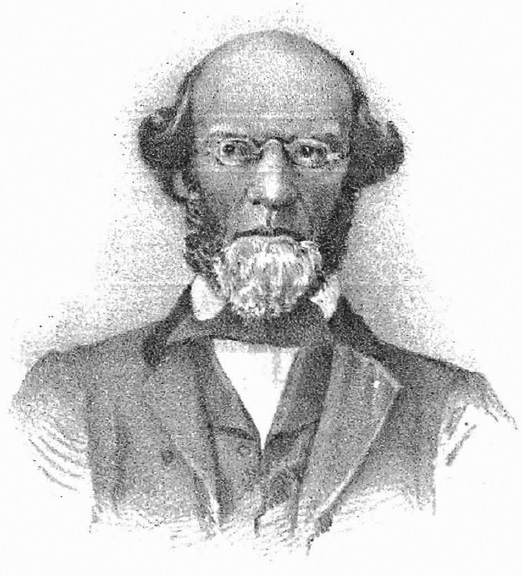
John Beach, from A.R. Fulton's Red Men of Iowa 1882.

Born in Massachusetts to William Beach and Lucy Tucker, John Beach enlisted in the U.S. Army during his late teens and graduated from the West Point Military Academy on July 1, 1832. Commissioned as a brevet 2nd lieutenant, Beach served on the frontier with the Infantry Regiment, assigned to Fort Armstrong and Fort Crawford during the 1830s. In 1836, he took command of the Fort Armstrong garrison after its commanding officer Lt. Col. William Davenport ordered an evacuation and led a march to Fort Snelling in Hennepin County, Minnesota. Beach remain at Fort Armstrong until being assigned elsewhere in November. During his last year with the Army, he was involved in recruitment efforts before his resignation on June 30, 1838. Beach later married Lucy Frances Street, the daughter of General Joseph Street.

General Street died in 1840, after which Beach was named U.S. Indian Agent to the Sac and Fox Tribes. Beach continued Street's policy of attempting to introduce European–mode farming and education to the inhabitants of the Raccoon River Agency reservation. He was ultimately unsuccessful in the former goal. He also opposed settlers squatting on reservation land as, in 1841, a force of dragoons under Lieutenant C.F. Ruff removed James Jordan and other settlers illegally living on the reservation. They had previously ignored Beach's order to leave and, after allowing them to gather their possessions, Ruff ordered his men to burn their homes. On October 11, 1842, Beach presided over the signing of a treaty which allowed the federal government to purchase much of Iowa from the Sac and Fox. He remained at the agency until 1847 where he resided in the area as a local farmer and merchant. At the start of the Civil War, Beach again signed up for Army duty. Due to hearing loss he was not sent to the front, but was used in training and drilling of recruits.

Returning to Agency City following the war, Beach became a writer and historian. He died at age 62 and was buried at Chief Wapello's Memorial Park. He had written a series of articles on the early history of the various tribes he interacted with during his career; the articles were published in the Agency Independent in the months following his death. His writings on the history of the Fox and Sac, as well as the fur trade on the Des Moines River, were later included in the History of Wapello County (1878).
