= Scouting in Nebraska =

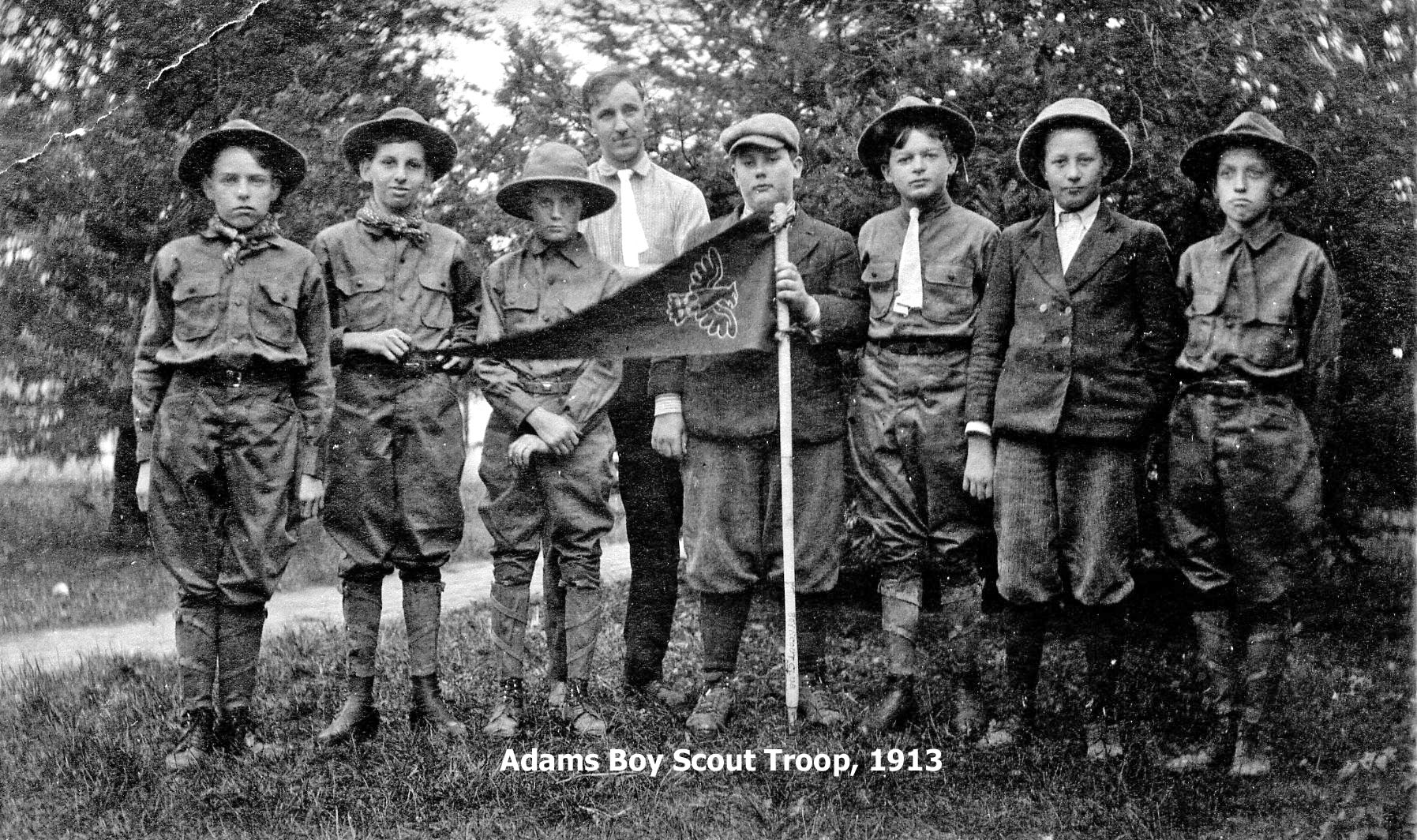
- Adams, Nebraska Boy Scout troop circa 1913

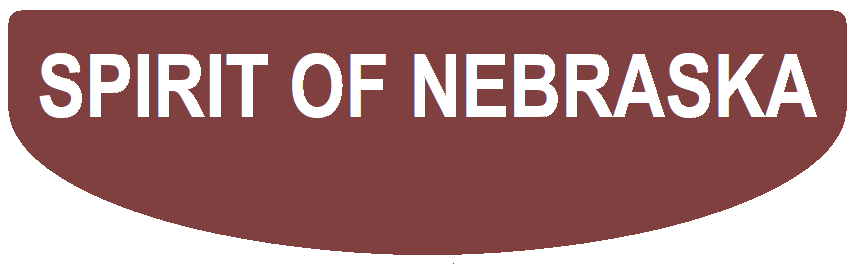
- Spirit of Nebraska

Scouting in Nebraska dates from the 1910s to the present day. There are three Boy Scouts of America local councils in Nebraska. All of Nebraska lies within Central Region, except for Sioux, Scotts Bluff, Banner, Kimball, Cheyenne, Dawes, Box Butte, Morrill, Cheyenne, Sheridan, Garden, Deuel and Grant counties, as part of Western Region.

== Boy Scouts of America ==
=== Early history (1910-1960) ===
The first Eagle Scout in Nebraska was Alva R. Fitch of Norfolk.

The Nebraska Panhandle Area Council was founded in 1929, and in 1931 changed its name to the Scottsbluff Area Council. That council in 1935 changed its name to Wyo-Braska Council, which it remained until it merged into Longs Peak Council in 1975.

In 1920, the Kearney Council (#322) was formed, changing its name to Buffalo County Council (#322) in 1922. The council changed its name back to Kearney Council (#322) in 1923, and to Fort Kearney Council (#322) in 1924. The Fort Kearney Council closed in 1926. In 1920, the Grand Island Council (#323) was formed, changing its name to Hall County Council (#323) in 1922. The council changed its name to Grand Island Council (#323) in 1924. The Grand Island Council closed in 1926. In 1920, the North Platte Council (#325) was formed, closing in 1926. In 1920, the Fremont Council (#327) was formed, hanging its name to the Pawnee Council (#327) in 1923. The council closed in 1928.

In 1917, the McCook Council was formed, and in 1922 the Red Cloud Council formed; both closed by 1923. In 1920, the Scottsbluff Council (#328) was formed. In 1920, the Platte Valley Council (#663) was formed. In 1924 Scottsbluff merged with Platte Valley. The council changed its name to Tri-City Council (#663) in 1926. Tri-City Council closed in 1927. In 1954, both the Tri-Trails (#323) and the Overland Trails (#322) councils were formed.

In 1919, the University Place (#329) and in 1917 the Lincoln (#324) councils were formed. In 1924, University Place (#329) merged into Lincoln (#324), and in 1926 the council changed its name to Lancaster County Council (#324). In 1927, it changed its name back to Lincoln, and in 1929, it changed its name to Cornhusker Council (#324). In 1926, the Nemaha Council (#743) was started. It merged with the Cornhusker Council (#324) in 1932.

In 1917, the Hartington Council was formed, closing in 1918. In 1915, the Omaha Council (#326) was formed, changing its name to the Covered Wagon Council (#326) in 1930.

=== Recent history (1960-2010) ===
The 1967 National Order of the Arrow Conference was held at the University of Nebraska.

The Mid-America Council (#326) was formed from a merger of the Covered Wagon Council (#326) and the Southwest Iowa Council (#175) in 1965. In 2000 the council merged with the Prairie Gold Area Council (#179) that had been located in Sioux City, Iowa.

In 1993, Tri-Trails (#323) merged into Overland Trails (#322) council. In 2024 Overland Trails Council was merged into Mid-America Council.

==== Cornhusker Council ====
Cornhusker Council (#324)
- Headquarters: Lincoln, Nebraska
- Website; Cornhusker Council

The Cornhusker Council serves eastern Nebraska, with headquarters in Lincoln and its main offices in Walton at the Outdoor Education Center (OEC).

===== History =====
In 1919, the University Place (#329) and in 1917 the Lincoln (#324) councils were formed. In 1924, University Place (#329) merged into Lincoln (#324), and in 1926 the council changed its name to Lancaster County Council (#324). In 1927, it changed its name back to Lincoln, and in 1929, it changed its name to Cornhusker Council (#324).

===== Camp =====
The council camp is Camp Cornhusker, located south of Humboldt, Nebraska.

===== Order of the Arrow =====
The Order of the Arrow lodge is the Golden Sun Lodge, #492.

==== Adventure West Council ====
Adventure West Council
- Headquarters: Greeley, Colorado
- Country: United States
- Membership: 4,809 youth in 2021
- President: Dusty Porter
- Council Commissioner: Lou Leopold
- Scout Executive/CEO: Nathan Dutson
- Website awbsa.org

The Adventure West Council is headquartered in Greeley, Colorado. Named after the tallest peak in the council territory, Longs Peak Council serves Scouting youth in northeastern Colorado, southeastern Wyoming and western Nebraska.

===== History =====
The WyoBraska Council of Scottsbluff merged into the Longs Peak Council in 1973. The council camps are Ben Delatour Scout Ranch near Fort Collins, Colorado and Camp Laramie Peak near Wheatland, Wyoming.

==== Mid-America Council ====
Mid-America Council (#326)
- Owner: Boy Scouts of America
- Headquarters: Omaha, Nebraska
- Country: United States
- Founded: 1965
- Website mac-bsa.org

The Mid-America Council offers programs in 58 counties in Nebraska, Iowa and South Dakota. The council was formed from a merger of the Covered Wagon Council and the Southwest Iowa Council in 1965. In 2000 the council merged with the Prairie Gold Area Council that had been located in Sioux City, Iowa.

===== History =====
In 1917, the McCook Council was formed, and in 1922 the Red Cloud Council formed; both closed by 1923. In 1920, the Scottsbluff Council (#328) was formed. In 1920, the Platte Valley Council (#663) was formed. In 1924 Scottsbluff merged with Platte Valley. The council changed its name to Tri-City Council (#663) in 1926. Tri-City Council closed in 1927. In 1954, both the Tri-Trails (#323) and the Overland Trails (#322) councils were formed.

In 1993, Tri-Trails (#323) merged into the Overland Trails Council (#322). In 2024, the Overland Trails Council merged into the Mid-America Council.

===== Camp =====
The council camp is Camp Augustine, located in Grand Island, although its address is in Doniphan.

===== Order of the Arrow =====
The Order of the Arrow Lodge is "Tatanka Anpetu-Wi, #94"

== Girl Scouts of the USA ==
Girl Scouting in Nebraska
- Map of Girl Scout Council in Nebraska

There are two Girl Scout councils in Nebraska.

=== Girl Scouts of Greater Iowa ===
Serves Dakota County, Nebraska.

Headquarters
Des Moines, Iowa
Website
www.girlscoutsiowa.org

=== Girl Scouts Spirit of Nebraska ===
Spirit of Nebraska council serves over 18,000 girls and has 6,000 adult volunteers in Nebraska, except Dakota County, and also the town of Carter Lake, Iowa (due to a change in the course of the Mississippi river, Carter Lake is surrounded by Nebraska and across the river from the rest of Iowa).

It was formed on May 1, 2008 by the merger of Girl Scouts Goldenrod Council, Girl Scouts — Great Plains Council, Guiding Star Girl Scout Council of Nebraska, Girl Scouts — Homestead Council, and Girl Scouts, Prairie Hills Council of Nebraska.

Headquarters
Omaha, Nebraska

Service Centers

- Columbus, Nebraska
- Grand Island, Nebraska
- Hastings, Nebraska
- Kearney, Nebraska
- Lincoln, Nebraska
- McCook, Nebraska
- Ogallala, Nebraska
- Omaha, Nebraska

Camps

- Camp Maha is 52 acres (210,000 m^{2}) on the Platte River just south of Papillion, Nebraska. It was leased by the Omaha Girl Scouts from 1933 to 1945 and bought in 1945.
- Camp Catron is 67 acres (270,000 m^{2}) outside Nebraska City, Nebraska. It was established in 1946 and named for Henry Catron who donated the land to the Girl Scouts.
- Camp Crossed Arrows is 150 acres (0.61 km^{2}) on the east bank of the Elkhorn River near Nickerson, Nebraska. It was acquired in 1963.
- Camp Cosmopolitan (aka Camp Cosmo) is 32 acres (130,000 m^{2}) outside Grand Island, Nebraska
- Lakeview is 20 acres (81,000 m^{2}) on Lake Maloney outside North Platte, Nebraska
- Hidden Oaks is a cabin near Valentine, Nebraska
- Hilltop is 32 acres (130,000 m^{2}) in Lincoln, Nebraska

== Other Scouting organizations ==
American Heritage Girls

American Heritage Girls operates one unit in Omaha, Nebraska.

Trail Life

Trail Life USA has units in the cities of Omaha, McCook, Nebraska City, and Benkelman.

== See also ==
- Ben Nelson - Eagle Scout
