= Lake Wapello State Park =

State park in Iowa, USA

- Location within Iowa Location within the United States
- Location: Davis County, Iowa, United States
- Nearest town: Drakesville, Iowa
- Coordinates: 40°48′55″N 92°34′57″W
- Area: 1,150 acres (470 ha)
- Elevation: 778 ft (237 m)
- Established: 1932
- Administrator: Iowa Department of Natural Resources
- Named for: Chief Wapello
- Website: Official website

Lake Wapello State Park is a state park located in Davis County in the U.S. state of Iowa. It stands west of the town of Drakesville and contains Lake Wapello.

== Description ==
The park focuses on recreational use of Lake Wapello, a 289-acre (117 ha) natural lake. Swimming at the sandy beach on the north side is supported by the modern beachhouse, originally constructed in the 1930s. The nearby boat ramp allows boating and fishing. The park allows a variety of styles of camping, including 13 rental cabins and 89 camping sites, with 44 powered for RVs. Several hiking trails are available, including a 6.6-mile (10.6 km) trail circumnavigating the lake. The park allows winter usage for snowmobiling and cross-country skiing.

A former Boy Scout facility on the south side of the lake, Camp Wapello, was a part of the park from 1984 until 1995.
