= Thomas Equestrian Center =

US equestrian center

Coordinates: 41.427°N 96.585°W

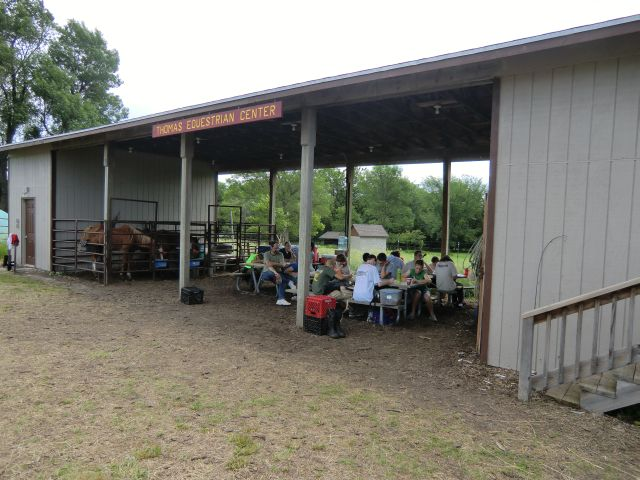
Merit Badge classes taught in the Thomas Equestrian Center's Teaching Area.

The Thomas Equestrian Center is a program area on the Boy Scout Camp, "Camp Cedars," in Saunders County, Nebraska. The program was started by Walter Thomas in 1998 with only four horses. Today, the Thomas Equestrian Center is no longer run by Walter Thomas due to differences among the council leadership but previously was Home to a miniature horse, two miniature donkeys, two ponies, and twenty-two other horses.

== Location ==
The Thomas Equestrian Center is located next to the COPE tower before the main entrance to Camp Cedars and has three individual areas for horses including an 85 ft diameter arena used for basic riding, along with a 175 ft long arena that is used for jumping, advanced riding, and feeding, and lastly the horses at the Thomas Equestrian Center have the paddock where the horses can get their water, eat their hay and cool off.

== Outside Camps ==
The Thomas Equestrian Center, unlike most program areas at Camp Cedars, hosts a variety of different camps outside of the Boy Scouts over the course of the summer. Such camps include:

- Camp Calvin Crest

A group of 15-20 Presbyterian children take part in Camp Calvin Crest's Ranch Camp every week where they drive to the Thomas Equestrian Center mornings from 9:30am to 11:30am Mondays through Fridays to learn, ride, and get to know horses at the Thomas Equestrian Center.

- Easter Seals Nebraska

Children and adults with physical or mental disabilities come from neighboring Camp Eagle to the Thomas Equestrian Center twice a week at 8:15am to not only groom Melvin the miniature horse and two donkeys, but they get a chance to ride in either a western or side saddle.

- Camp Fontanelle

Children from Methodist Camp Fontanelle come and spend most of the day at the Thomas Equestrian Center where they get to learn about, ride, groom, and get to know the many horses and donkeys of the Thomas Equestrian Center. As of 2018 this program is no longer.

- Project Independence

Camps of visually impaired or blind children and adults come to the Thomas Equestrian Center to get to know horses and enjoy themselves through Equine therapyas of 2018 this camp is no longer.

== Classes ==
The Thomas Equestrian Center has many classes it provides for scouters attending Camp Cedars. As of 2019, these classes are:

- Advanced Horsemanship

Due to the lack of riding time in the Horsemanship Merit Badge, the Advanced Horsemanship class was created to give scouts, especially older scouts, a week full of learning the finer details of riding from riding in an English saddle, to riding bareback, and playing exciting games such as horse soccer or wild, wild west on horseback. To take this class, you must have the Horsemanship Merit Badge.

- Advanced Roping

Advanced roping is a great class for scouts who want to work even more with their roping skills. Scouts learn to desensitize a horse to a flying rope and by the end of the week have learned to rope off horseback at both stationary targets and moving cattle-like targets. Scouts must take both Horsemanship Merit Badge as well as Basic Roping before they can take Advanced Roping.

- Basic Roping

Most scouts who come to the Thomas Equestrian Center have only heard or read about roping but never actually roped. The Basic Roping class teaches scouts about the history of roping from Spain in the 1800s to modern day roping events. Scouts learn to tie a honda knot and parts of the lasso. Scouts enjoy learning to rope and their targets gradually increase in difficulty. Although this class only teaches stationary ground roping, scouts can later take Advanced Roping and take their roping skills to a whole new level.

- Basic Riding Skills

Although the class is intended for adults, scouts and adults alike may enroll in Basic Riding Skills. In this class, wranglers judge the experience the rider has on horseback whether it be first time or more advanced, and progress the rider through new levels of riding from bareback riding to English saddles, or even riding in faster gaits.

- Horsemanship Merit Badge

One of two Merit Badges the Thomas Equestrian Center offers, the Horsemanship Merit Badge is requirement based. Although this gives scouts a great amount of book knowledge on horses, requirements only allow for less than two minutes of riding time on horseback. However scouts do learn about horse safety, parts of a horse, breeds of horses, five horse diseases, conformation, lameness and unsoundness, hoof care, grooming, feeding, parts of a saddle and bridle, mounting and dismounting, how to ride, how to lead a horse, storing equipment, and how to saddle and bridle a horse. To take the Horsemanship Merit Badge at the Thomas Equestrian Center, you must be at least 13 years of age.

- Medieval Jousting

Another class to give riders more horseback time, Medieval Jousting was created to give scouts a once in a lifetime experience cantering down a list towards a wooden target with reins in one hand and a lance in the other. Scouts learn the medieval history of jousting, as well as the modern sport of jousting. Scouts also learn about the history of chainmail. Scouts have a chance to create and bring home their own chainmail creations.

- Junior Equestrian

Scouts under 13 are not technically allowed to enroll in the Horsemanship Merit Badge until they are 13 years old, however the class Jr. Equestrian was created to provide younger scouts with an opportunity to ride for a week as well as building up skills that will greatly prep and benefit them for when they do take the Horsemanship Merit Badge. Scouts learn to ride as well as playing exciting games on horseback including horse soccer.

== Unique Activities ==
Scouts attending Camp Cedars can choose to enjoy unique equestrian activities. WITH THE EXCEPTION OF TRAIL RIDES ALL PROGRAMS ARE NO LONGER TAUGHT.

=== Travois ===
Scouts enrolled in the Indian Lore Merit Badge will receive the opportunity to assemble and ride a horse-pulled travois. Although a travois was originally used by Native Americans for mainly transportation of the elderly or injured, scouts [since 2014] receive the chance to ride and learn about the importance of the travois in Native American culture and tradition.

=== Painting ===
Scouts in the Art Merit Badge previously painted pictures of trees to meet requirements. In 2014, the Thomas Equestrian Center proposed that scouts paint a picture of a standing horse. As of 2015, scouts now paint their own pictures and names on the side of the horse. This activity is also available to other visiting camps such as Camp Calvin Crest Ranch Camp.

=== Overnight ===
Monday nights, scouts who have completed the Horsemanship Merit Badge are eligible to take a 7-mile total trail ride (with wranglers walking along the whole way) to Camp Eagle's lake as the sun sets. Scouts dismount their horse and set up tarps and sleeping bags where they will sleep under the stars all night long. In the morning, scouts get back up on horses and return to the Thomas Equestrian Center where they are served breakfast and sent to their first class.

=== Trail Rides ===
Tuesday, Wednesday, and Thursday are open trail rides. After signing up in the administration office, scouts, adults, and family alike can go on a 2-3 mile trail ride (with wranglers walking along the whole way) through the woods next to the Thomas Equestrian Center. These trail rides take place at 7:00pm, 7:45pm, and 8:15pm. The maximum number of riders depends on the number of available horses.

=== Open Roping ===
As of 2014, the Thomas Equestrian Center, in effort to give all scouts a chance to rope, provides open roping Tuesday, Wednesday, and Thursday nights at 7:45pm. Attendees will be given ropes and targets and will be taught the necessary roping skills.

== Horses ==
List subject to change based on year.

1. Hobo
2. Champagne
3. May Cedars
4. Zeus
5. Geronimo
6. Diamond
7. Oz
8. Leo
9. Nitro
10. Susie May
11. Morgan
12. Vinny
13. Scooter
14. Snicker
15. Dizzy
16. Brody
17. Merry
18. Dakota
19. Buffy
20. Melvin
21. Dacoda
22. Casey
23. Jazzy
24. Bonnie
25. Clyde
