= Wapello (chief) =

Meskwaki leader (1787-1842)

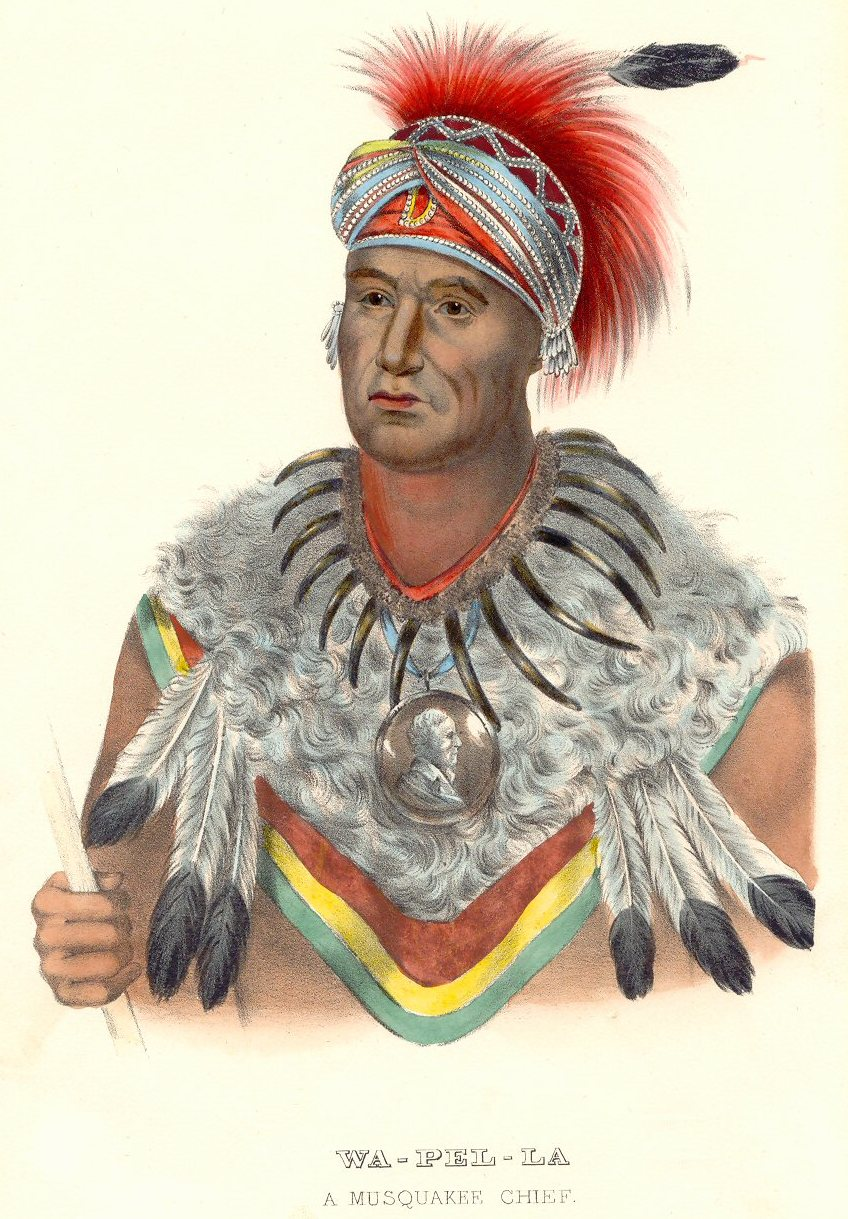
- "Wa-pel-la, A Musquakee Chief" by Charles Bird King
- Born: c. 1787; Prairie du Chien, Northwest Territory
- Died: March 15, 1842 near the Skunk River, east of present-day Ottumwa, Iowa
- Resting place: Chief Wapello's Memorial Park, near Agency, Iowa
- Other name: He Who Is Painted White
- Occupation: Peace chief of the Meskwaki
- Known for: Negotiating land cession treaties with the United States and his friendship with Indian agent Joseph M. Street

Wapello (c. 1787 – March 15, 1842) was a peace chief of the Meskwaki, or Fox, people in what is now Iowa. Although born a Sauk, he became one of the principal civil leaders of the Meskwaki during the decades of United States expansion into the upper Mississippi Valley and served as one of the tribe's "money chiefs," the federally recognized leaders to whom treaty annuities were paid. He signed a series of treaties ceding Meskwaki and allied Sauk lands to the United States, worked closely with U.S. Indian agent Joseph M. Street, and was buried beside Street at the Sac and Fox Agency near present-day Agency, Iowa, a site now preserved as Chief Wapello's Memorial Park.

== Early life ==
Wapello was born in 1787 at Prairie du Chien, Northwest Territory. Although born into the Sauk people, he rose to become a peace chief among the closely related Meskwaki, who called themselves Meshkwahkihaki, or the Red Earth people, and who had been pushed south and west from Wisconsin into Illinois, Iowa, and Missouri following the Fox Wars of the early 18th century. His name has been translated as "He Who Is Painted White". He was described by contemporaries as short in stature but powerfully built, with a mild and dignified manner that contributed to his reputation as a peacemaker.

== Leadership among the Meskwaki ==
Wapello led a Meskwaki village or band that proved among the most willing of the tribe to accommodate United States demands, a stance that shaped his career as American settlement pushed onto lands along the upper Mississippi. The first Sac and Fox land cession to the United States, made in 1804, opened the Illinois side of the Mississippi River to settlement, though white settlers did not arrive there in large numbers until the late 1820s. By that decade, Wapello and his followers had already made their home in the river valleys of the Skunk and Des Moines rivers in what is now southeastern Iowa. In 1829 he led his people to Muscatine Slough on the west bank of the Mississippi, near the site of the later frontier town of Wapello, Iowa, before the band moved on into Iowa's interior.

The Meskwaki did not take part in the Black Hawk War of 1832, but Wapello, along with neutral Sauk bands, was nonetheless compelled to cede tribal lands in eastern Iowa after the war, including territory known as "Dubuque's Mines." The resulting treaty also elevated the Sauk leader Keokuk to head chief of a combined "Sac and Fox Tribe," a U.S.-imposed political arrangement that gave the more numerous Sauk primacy over the Meskwaki even though the two peoples remained culturally and politically distinct. As one of the Meskwaki's money chiefs, Wapello controlled a share of the resulting treaty annuities, which strengthened his standing with U.S. officials but also drew resentment from Meskwaki who regarded him, along with the fellow money chief Poweshiek, as too accommodating to both the United States and the Sauk. Wapello's reputation for heavy drinking further fed an image of him among critics as corrupt.

== Treaties and diplomacy ==
Over two decades, Wapello was party to a succession of treaties that steadily reduced Meskwaki and allied Sauk landholding in Iowa, including agreements concluded at Fort Armstrong in 1822 and 1832, at Prairie du Chien in 1825 and 1830, and at Dubuque in 1836. In 1837 he traveled with Keokuk and other chiefs to Washington, D.C., and on through several eastern cities, at the invitation of the United States government. During the visit he took part in negotiating yet another cession of Meskwaki and Sauk land.

Following that 1837 treaty, Wapello and his village relocated to the newly built Sac and Fox Agency at present-day Agency, Iowa, which was fully established in 1838 and 1839 under the direction of Agent Joseph M. Street. Street promoted what he termed the "Christian civilization" of the Sauk and Meskwaki, and in 1838 Wapello permitted a Methodist circuit-riding preacher to hold a Christian worship service inside his own lodge, the first such service held in Iowa's interior, though Wapello himself did not adopt Christianity. Disputes over the distribution of treaty annuities among the tribes' money chiefs, Wapello and Poweshiek for the Meskwaki and Keokuk and Appanoose for the Sauk, produced bitter factional conflict that drew in Street and other federal officials in 1840 and 1841.

By 1841, Wapello's village near the agency had achieved enough stability that he resisted further pressure to move his people again. Speaking that year against continued removal, he told a council of U.S. officials, according to a contemporary account, that the Meskwaki were left with little land and few people, that they were "fast melting away," and that the Great Spirit had been unkind in not giving his people the knowledge of white men, for otherwise they would stand on an equal footing.

== Death and legacy ==
While on a hunting trip near the Skunk River east of Ottumwa, Iowa, Wapello died on March 15, 1842. He was later buried in accordance with his oft-expressed wish that he be laid to rest alongside his good friend General Street, at the site of the government agency in what is now a small park named Chief Wapello's Memorial Park located southeast of Agency, Iowa.

- Chief Wapello's portrait was painted by Charles Bird King and a lithograph included with the chief's biography in Thomas McKenney and James Hall's History of the Indian Tribes of North America (1836–1844, three volumes).
- Chief Wapello is currently the official corporate identity of Mid-Continent Airlines.
- In Iowa, the city of Wapello and Wapello County are named for him. West of Drakesville, in Davis County, rests Lake Wapello, the enclosing Lake Wapello State Park, and the adjacent former Boy Scout Camp Wapello.
- An annual event called Chief Wapello Days is held in Wapello, Iowa.
- In Illinois, the town of Hanover, was once named for Wapello and contains the Jo Daviess Conservation Foundation's Wapello Land and Water Reserve.
- The USS Wapello (YN-56), a United States Navy net tender in commission from 1941 to 1946, was named for him.
- A large, 450-pound (200 kg) statue of Chief Wapello was installed in his honor atop the Wapello County Courthouse in Ottumwa, Iowa since the building was constructed in 1894. The statue and its mounting base received severe damage during a thunderstorm in June 2012, causing it to fall. After repair, restoration, and upgrade of the base with stainless steel, the statue was returned to the rooftop on March 13, 2014.

== See also ==
- Mid-Continent Airlines
