= Lake Wapello =

Lake in Iowa, USA

- Location within Iowa Location within the United States
- Location: Davis County, Iowa
- Coordinates: 40°48′54″N 92°34′48″W
- Basin countries: United States
- Surface area: 289 acres (117 ha)
- Max. depth: 33.7 ft (10.3 m)
- Surface elevation: 778 ft (237 m)

Lake Wapello is a man-made lake in the U.S. state of Iowa, 7 miles (11 km) west of the town of Drakesville. The lake is entirely contained in Lake Wapello State Park, which promotes recreational use of the lake. The lake is named for Chief Wapello of the Meskwaki people.
