= Nicholas Boilvin =

American frontiersman (c.1761–1827)

- Born: c. 1761; Quebec, Canada
- Died: 1827; Mississippi River near St. Louis, Missouri
- Other name: Nicholas Boivin
- Known for: Early Wisconsin frontiersman, pioneer and trader; first appointed U.S. Indian Agent to the Winnebago.
- Title: U.S. Indian Agent to the Winnebago
- Term: 1811-1827
- Successor: Joseph M. Street
- Partner: Miss St. Cyr of St. Louis
- Children: 5 children

Nicholas Boilvin (c. 1761–1827) was a 19th-century American frontiersman, fur trader, and U.S. Indian Agent. He was the first appointed agent to the Winnebagos, as well as the Sauk and Meskwaki, and one of the earliest pioneers to settle in present-day Prairie du Chien, Wisconsin. His sons Nicholas Boilvin, Jr. and William C. Boilvin both became successful businessmen in Wisconsin during the mid- to late 19th century.

His wife was formerly a Miss St. Cyr of St. Louis. (WHC v.10, p. 222)

His daughter Catherine Boilvin Myott—also Métis, by her father's marriage to a Ho-Chunk woman, became prominent as a cultural mediator with early settlers in the next wave in the American era in Wisconsin, such as Henry and Susan Hempstead Gratiot of the founding family of St. Louis.

== Biography ==
Boilvin was born to a soldier residing in Quebec during the Seven Years' War. His father had gained "a good record by great kindness to a wounded American surgeon" who was held as a prisoner-of-war after his capture in the failed invasion of Canada in 1775. Boilvin traveled to the Northwest Territory after the signing of the Second Treaty of Paris in 1783 and, after settling in the Illinois Territory, he began trading with the local tribes in the Prairie du Chien area around February 1810. He was also a justice of the peace, being appointed in St. Clair County on May 3, 1809 and in Madison County on June 12, 1814.

In a chance meeting while in St. Louis, he met with the American surgeon whom his father had befriended in Quebec. The surgeon was able to arrange for Boilvin to be appointed the principal Indian agent for the Prairie du Chien region on March 14, 1811. Observing the lead mining activity in the area by the Iowas, the Sauk and Meskwaki as well as Canadians during this time, he communicated the future importance of the lead mining region to Secretary of War William Eustis. He also reported the growing unrest and militantism among the Winnebago and other local tribes prior to Tecumseh's War and was told to him that the nations would:

... all join together and have but one fire and one kettle to eat out of, with the same spoon for them all; that they had but one Father [Britain] that had helped them in their misfortunes, and that they would assemble, defend their Father and keep their lands.

He resided there for several years however, during the War of 1812, he and his family were forced to leave the village and evacuated onto an American gunboat during the attack on Prairie du Chien by Lieutenant Colonel William McKay on July 14, 1814. Prior to the attack, Boilvin had directed a local resident to drive up his cattle, wishing to kill one of the heifers for some fresh meat. When the man spotted the approaching British forces, he returned to warn Boilvin. Going out to see for himself, Boilvin returned to raise the alarm and assisted in the evacuation of the settlement. The officers stationed at the garrison had been preparing to go riding in the countryside and, had McKay's forces arrived an hour or two later, it is thought the garrison would have been without an officer during the subsequent battle. Boilvin's house was destroyed during the attack, and a second house was built at the site in 1816.

Boilvin studied the customs and culture of the Winnebago and provided the Department of War with a written vocabulary of the Winnebago language. His administration was supported by Eustis who provided him with considerable funding. In 1815, he became involved in a feud between Eustis and Governor William Clark who, according to a report he sent, accused Clark of abusing his position by "improperly using Indian goods and public property" for the benefit of his nephew Benjamin O'Fallon.

In the years prior to the Black Hawk War, he had the trust and confidence of many of the tribes in the Upper Mississippi. A skilled interpreter, he was present at several treaties signed between the Winnebago and the United States during the 1810s and 1820s. He and Maurice Blondeau often negotiated directly with tribes on behalf of the federal government. Boilvin was also a close friend of Michel Brisbois, who resided near Boilvin's home in Prairie du Chien during his later years. After the 1837 Winnebago Treaty, John Baptiste Peon, the husband of Angelica Brisbois, Michel's daughter with Cham-brey-win-kaw, a Ho-Chunk woman, claimed in an affidavit that Boilvin relied on his wife for interpreting, though she was never compensated for this work. Both Boilvin and Angelica Brisbois were deceased by this time.

During the summer of 1827, Boilvin drowned while traveling upriver on a keel boat to St. Louis and was later buried there. His sub-agent John Marsh was in charge of the agency until the appointment of Joseph M. Street by then Secretary of War James Barbour under the recommendation of Henry Clay later that year. His son Nicholas Boilvin, Jr. successfully petitioned the United States Congress for compensation to Boilvin's family. Boilvin, Jr. was awarded $6,000 while the other four children received $4,000 each.

== Legacy ==
A street on St. Feriole Island in Prairie du Chien was named Boilvin Street in honor of Nicholas Boilvin. It is misspelled Bolvin Street today.
