= Mid-America Council =

Boy Scouts of America organization

Mid-America Council (#326)
- Owner: Boy Scouts of America
- Headquarters: Omaha, Nebraska
- Country: United States
- Founded: 1965
- Website mac-bsa.org

The Mid-America Council of the Boy Scouts of America offers programs in 58 counties in Nebraska, Iowa and South Dakota. The Mid-America Council was formed from a merger of the Covered Wagon Council and the Southwest Iowa Council in 1965. The first recorded Council in the area was in 1918 as the Omaha Council. In 2000 the council merged with the Prairie Gold Council that had been located in Sioux City, Iowa.

The first recorded Scouting activity was a 1917 potato harvest by Troop 42, still in existence, reported on by the Omaha World-Herald.

== History ==
In 1917, the Hartington Council was formed, closing in 1918. In 1915, the Omaha Council (#326) was formed, changing its name to the Covered Wagon Council (#326) in 1930. The Mid-America Council (#326) was formed from a merger of the Covered Wagon Council (#326) and the Southwest Iowa Council (#175) in 1965. In 2000 the council merged with the Prairie Gold Area Council (#179) that had been located in Sioux City, Iowa.

In 1920, LeMars Council (#182) was created, merging into the Sioux City Area Council (#185) in 1926.

In 1918, Sioux City Council (#185) was created, changing its name to the Sioux City Area Council (#185) in 1926. In 1939, Sioux City Area changed its name to the Sergeant Floyd Area Council (#185) in 1939. Sergeant Floyd Area merged into Prairie Gold Council (#179) in 1972. With this merger the combined Council changed its name to Prairie Gold 'Area' Council

In 1919, Fort Dodge Council (#179) was created. In 1942 the council changed its name to Prairie Gold Council (#179).

In 1920, the Shenandoah Council was founded, folding in 1921.

In 1919, Council Bluffs Council (#175) was created. In 1926 the council changed its name to Waubonsie Boyer Council (#175). It changed its name again to the Southwest Iowa Council (#175), eventually merging into the Mid-America Council in 1965.

In 2024, Overland Trails Council merged into the Mid-America Council.

== Organization ==
The Council is separated into twelve districts.

- Black Hawk District
- Diamond Dick District
- Goldenrod District
- Iron Horse District
- Northwest Iowa District
- Ohwahnasee District
- Petah La Shauro District
- Thundercloud District
- Trailblazer District
- Twin Lakes District
- Wagon Wheel District
- War Eagle District

== Camps ==
Mid-America Council operates four camps. Its Boy Scout summer camp is located at Camp Cedars, near Fremont, Nebraska while its Cub Scout resident camp is located at Little Sioux Scout Ranch near Little Sioux, Iowa. Other council camps include Camp Eagle, near Fremont, Nebraska and Camp Wa-Kon-Da, Bellevue, Nebraska. The council formerly operated Camp Wakonda near Griswold, Iowa, in operation from 1948 until 1978. The Little Sioux Scout Ranch was heavily damaged by a tornado on June 11, 2008, which killed four Scouts and hospitalized 40 of 93 Scouts and Scouters attending a leadership development event. Several camps have been sold for private hunting and recreation purposes including Camp Butterfield.

=== Little Sioux Scout Ranch ===
The Little Sioux Scout Ranch is a 1,800 acres (7.3 km^{2}) Scout reservation formerly operated by the Mid-America Council of the Boy Scouts of America. It is located in Little Sioux, Iowa, approximately sixty miles north of Omaha, Nebraska in Iowa's Loess Hills and is approximately 15 minutes east of Interstate 29.

Hiking trails cover the heavily timbered camp, along with mowed meadows and several remote campsites. There are also four cabin shelters and a 15 acres (0.061 km^{2}) lake. The Mutual of Omaha Administration Building was completed in 2000, and two years later the MidAmerican Energy Pavilion was finished, seating 300 at picnic tables. Individual packs, troops and posts use the facility, along with Order of the Arrow conclaves, district and council camporees. Pahuk Pride, a weeklong National Youth Leadership Training event, was held annually at this camp.

The camp was the site of a tornado that killed four Boy Scouts and injured 48 others on June 11, 2008.

=== Camp Cedars ===
The Mid-America Council's summer camp is located at Camp Cedars, located on the Covered Wagon Scout Reservation (CWSR) near the village of Cedar Bluffs in Saunders County, Nebraska. Perched on a bluff above the Platte River, the camp has 700 acres (2.8 km^{2}) of deciduous woods, prairie, and river bottoms. Facilities include a heated outdoor pool, shower houses, the Thomas Equestrian Center, an air-conditioned dining hall seating over 500 and an amphitheater with seating for over 1,000 audience members, as well as four renovated, air-conditioned cabins and three air-conditioned lodges. Cedars features an extensive Challenging Outdoor Program Experience (COPE) course a zip line, a 60-foot (18 m) tall rappelling tower and climbing walls. There is also a shooting sports facility, a nature center, and an equestrian center. Twelve campsites provide 264 permanent tent platforms, including a wheelchair-accessible campsite, for Scouts and leaders.

It has been the site of archeological digs. Following the tragedy at the Little Sioux Scout Ranch, Camp Cedars built tornado shelters in response. In addition to Little Sioux, Cedars plays is an important site for the Kit-Ke-Hak-O-Kut Lodge of the Order of the Arrow, as well as its own camping society called Nani-Ba-Zhu. Nani-Ba-Zhu was founded in 1919 at Camp Gifford, which was the Council summer camp prior to Cedars. After ceasing to operate starting in 1939, the tradition was renewed at Cedars in 1990.

== Kit-Ke-Hak-O-Kut Lodge ==
Kit-Ke-Hak-O-Kut Lodge
- Location: Omaha, Nebraska
- Founded: 1965
- Website lodge97.org

The Order of the Arrow Scouting's national honor society is represented in the Mid-America Council by the Kit-Ke-Hak-O-Kut Lodge. The lodge is administratively divided into chapters corresponding to the council's districts. The Kit-Ke-Hak-O-Kut Lodge is part of Section G5, in the Gateway Region. Home of Steven Buer Jr., the 2022 National Vice Chief of the Order of the Arrow.

== See also ==
- Scouting in Nebraska
- Scouting in Iowa
- Scouting in South Dakota
