= Scouting in Iowa =

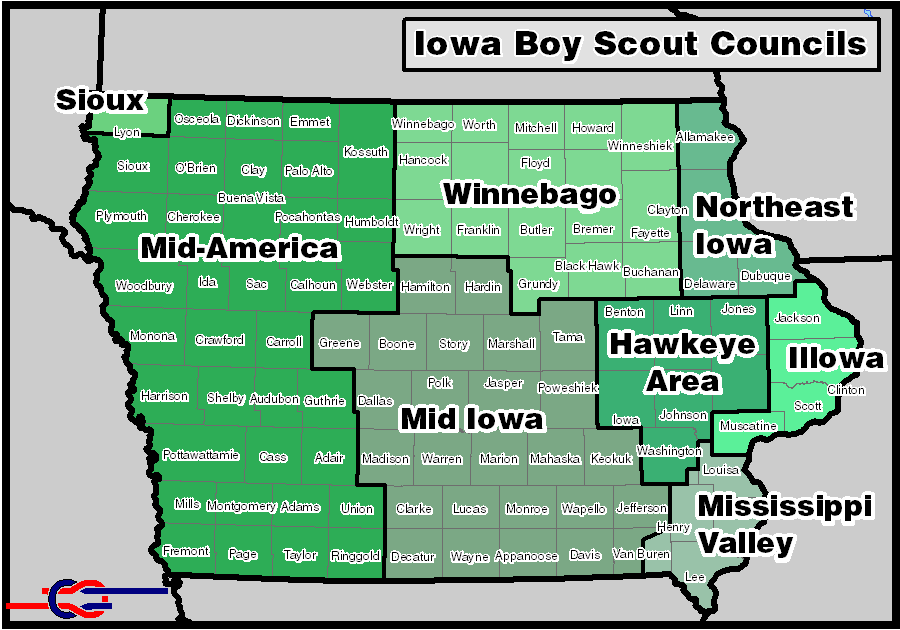
- BSA councils serving Iowa

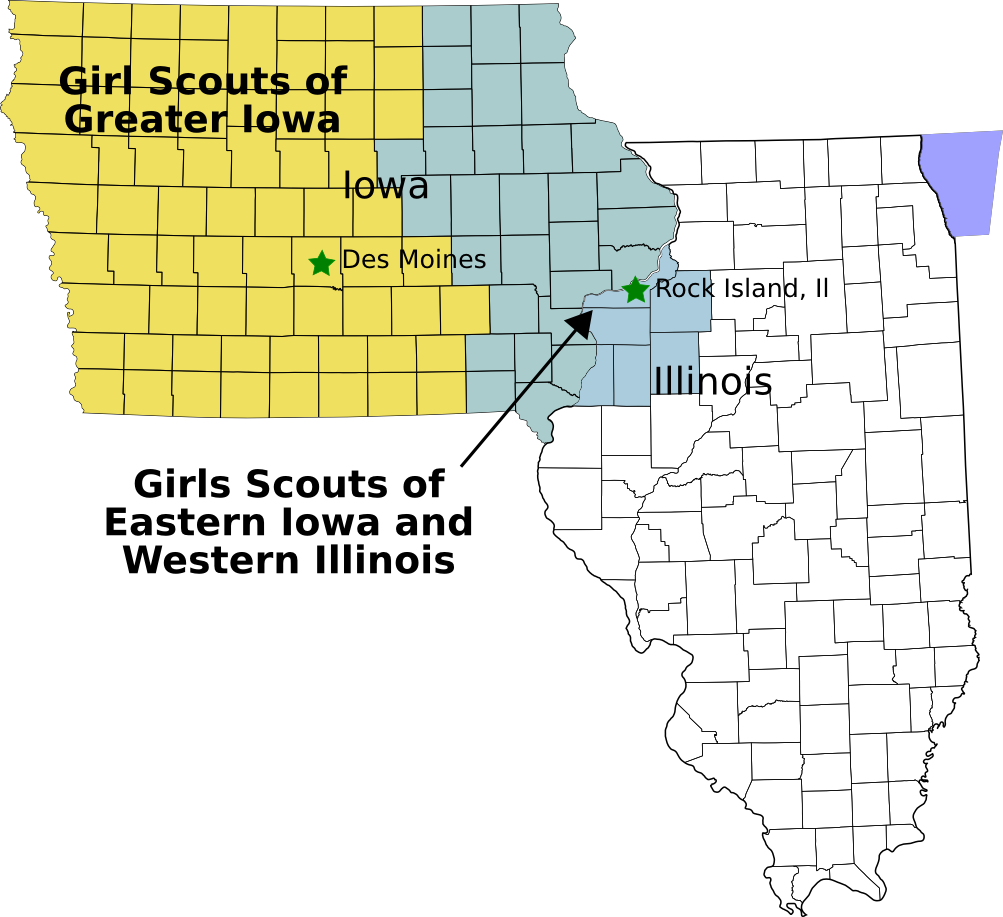
- GSUSA councils serving Iowa

Scouting in Iowa has a long history, from the 1910s to the present day, serving thousands of youth in programs that suit the environment in which they live.

== Early history (1910–1960) ==
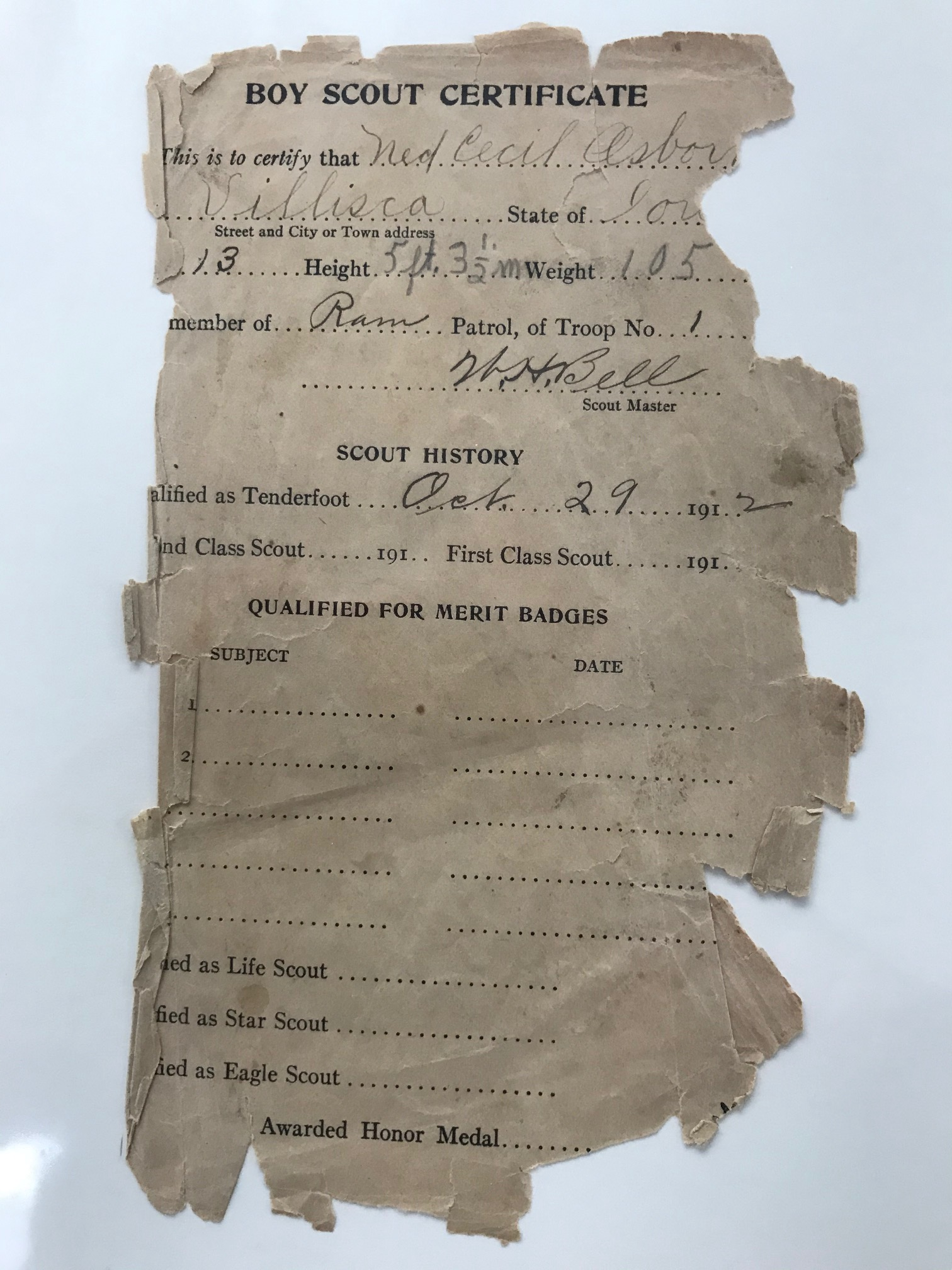
Ned's 1912 Tenderfoot Certificate

Scouting began in Jewell, Iowa, due to the generosity of Mrs. Carrie A. Strong. Mrs. Strong had resided in Jewell and moved to California, but due to her interest in the town even after relocation, she gave the town of Jewell its first step in Scouting. In 1916, Mrs. Strong came back to Jewell for her annual visit went before the city fathers to tell them that she would provide the fund to buy and build a Scout House on, and give $1000 to construct a building suitable for the Scout program.

A parcel of land was bought from H. K. and Christian Gronbeck on October 14, 1916, for the sum of $840.00. The building was let to Peterson Builders for the Scout House 240 by 48 feet and 12 foot high. The completed cost for the building was $935.00. The First Scoutmaster was Reverend Norstad and his assistants were professors from the then Jewell Lutheran College. F. H. Ferbitz became Scoutmaster in October 1923 with 28 Scouts under his leadership. A fife and drum corps was also started at that time and the grounds were cleaned and the building painted. A basketball league was formed which consisted of four teams. After the basketball games, the boys would have what they referred to as "a feed". These feeds were paid for by the continued contributions of Mrs. Strong up to the time of her death on November 27, 1923.

== Recent history (1960–2010) ==
During the 1950s and 1960s eastern Iowa was home to the Buffalo Bill Area Council (#176) spanning an area from Dubuque to Muscatine. The council office was located in Davenport. The summer camp, Camp Minneyata, was outside of Dixon on the Wapsipinicon River and featured a canoe base, swimming pool, and lodge hall. The Order of the Arrow Lodge was the "Golden Eagle" Lodge, No. 313.

The Mid-America Council (#326) was formed from a merger of the Covered Wagon Council (#326) and the Southwest Iowa Council (#175) in 1965. In 2000 the council merged with the Prairie Gold Area Council (#179) that had been located in Sioux City, Iowa.

In 1918, the Keokuk Council was founded, folding in 1919. In 1920, the Fort Madison Council (#180) was founded, and closed in 1928.

In 1917, the Burlington Council (#171) was founded, changing its name to Southeast Iowa Council (#171) in 1929. The Southeast Iowa Council merged into the Mississippi Valley Council (#141) in 1993.

== Councils ==
There are eight BSA local councils serving Iowa.

=== Hawkeye Area Council ===
Hawkeye Area Council (#172)
- Headquarters: Cedar Rapids, Iowa
- Founded: 1952
- Website hawkeyebsa.org

The Hawkeye Area Council serves Benton, Cedar, Iowa, Jones, Johnson, Linn, and Washington counties within Eastern Iowa. It Currently has two districts, Northern Lights and Southern Prairie.

==== History ====
In 1916, the Cedar Rapids Council was founded, folding in 1919.

In 1924, the Linn County Council (#172) was founded, changing its name to the Cedar Rapids Area Council (#172) in 1927. In 1941 the council changed its name to the Waubeck Area Council (#172) in 1941. In 1920, the Iowa City Council (#181) was founded, changing its name to the Iowa City Area Council (#181) in 1924. In 1941 the council changed its name to the Iowa River Valley Council (#181) in 1941.

In 1952, the Waubeck Area Council (#172) and the Iowa River Valley Council (#181) merged to form the Hawkeye Area Council (#172).

==== Organization ====
- Northern Lights District
- Southern Prairie District

==== Camps ====
- Howard H. Cherry Scout Reservation
- Camp Wakonda

==== Order of the Arrow ====
- Cho-Gun-Mun-A-Nock Lodge

=== Illowa Council ===
Illowa Council (#133)
- Headquarters: Davenport, Iowa
- Founded: 1967
- Website illowabsa.org

Headquartered in Davenport, Iowa, the Illowa Council serves Scouts in western Illinois and eastern Iowa in the Quad Cities area with one camp, Loud Thunder Scout Reservation. Konepaka Ketiwa Lodge #38 (part of Section C-3A) is the Order of the Arrow lodge that serves this council.

In 1937, the Mesquakie Area Council (#174) was founded, merging into the Buffalo Bill Area Council (#176) in 1958. In 1915, the Davenport Council (#176) was founded, changing its name to Buffalo Bill Area Council (#176) in 1928. It merged into the Illowa Council (#133) in 1967.

- Hoover District
- Inali District
- Kittan District
- Mesquakie District
- Saukenuk District

=== Mid America Council ===
Headquartered in Nebraska, the Mid-America Council offers programs in 58 counties in Nebraska, Iowa, and South Dakota. The council has several camps, including the Little Sioux Scout Ranch.

=== Mid-Iowa Council ===
Mid-Iowa Council (#177)
- Headquarters: Des Moines, Iowa
- Website www.scoutingiowa.org

The Mid Iowa Council serves the area of the state capital, Des Moines.

In 1914 the Ames Council (#169) was formed, changing its name to the Story County Council (#169) in 1923. The council changed its name again in 1930 to the Tall Corn Area Council (#169). In 1924 the Boone County Council (#170) was formed, merging into the Story County Council (#169) in 1926.

In 1914 the Des Moines Council (#177) was formed, changing its name to the Polk and Jasper Counties Council (#177) in 1926. In 1927, Polk and Jasper Counties Council (#177) changed its name to the Des Moines Area Council (#177) in 1927. In 1924 the Mahaska-Poweshiek-Jasper Counties Council (#183) was formed, merging into the Des Moines Area Council (#177) in 1926.

In 1932, the Des Moines Area Council (#177) and the Tall Corn Area Council (#169) merged to become the Tall Corn Area Council (#177).

In 1927 the Newton City Council (#778) was formed, changing its name to the Tri-Valley Council (#778) in 1929. Newton City merged into the Tall Corn Area Council (#177) in 1931.

In 1924 the Marshall and Tama Counties Council (#658) was formed, changing its name to the Central Iowa Council (#658) in 1925. In 1942 Central Iowa merged with the Tall Corn Area Council (#177).

In 1919 the Ottumwa Council (#194) was formed, changing its name to the Southern Iowa Area Council (#184) in 1928.

In 1970, Southern Iowa Area Council (#184) and Tall Corn Area Council (#177) merged to become the Mid-Iowa Council (#177).

=== Mississippi Valley Council ===
This council is headquartered in Quincy, Illinois, and is served by Black Hawk Lodge #67. This council serves Scouts in Illinois and Iowa.

=== Northeast Iowa Council ===
Northeast Iowa Council (#178)
- Headquarters: Dubuque, Iowa
- Website www.scoutsiowa.com

The Northeast Iowa Council is headquartered in Dubuque, IA and serves the counties of Dubuque, Delaware, Clayton, and Allamakee, as well as the cities of East Dubuque and Bellevue. Camp C.S. Klaus is the resident summer camp facility of the Northeast Iowa Council, and is located just west of Colesburg, Iowa.

In 1915 the Dubuque Council (#178) was formed, changing its name to the Dubuque Area Council (#178) in 1934. The council changed its name to the Northeast Iowa Council (#178) in 1935.

In 1918 the Clinton Council (#174) was formed, changing its name to the Clinton Area Council (#174) in 1927. The Clinton Area Council changed its name to the Macquarie Area Council (#174) in 1937.

=== Sioux Council ===
The Sioux Council serves Scouts in South Dakota, Iowa and Minnesota.

=== Winnebago Council ===
Winnebago Council (#173)
- Headquarters: Waterloo, Iowa
- Website www.winnebagobsa.org

The Winnebago Council (#173) is a council of the Boy Scouts of America. The Winnebago Council serves Scouts BSA, Cub Scouts, adult volunteers and Venturers in 17 counties located in North Central Iowa. Including: Black Hawk, Grundy, Butler, Franklin, Wright, Hancock, Winnebago, Worth, Cerro Gordo, Mitchell, Floyd, Bremer, Chickasaw, Howard, Winneshiek, Fayette, and Buchanan.

In 1918, the Jesup Council was founded, folding that same year.

In 1918, the Oelwein Council was founded, folding that same year.

In 1918, the Charles City Council was founded, folding in 1920.

In 1922, the Cedar Falls Council was founded, folding in 1924.

In 1920, the Waterloo Council (#186) was founded, changing its name in Wapsipinicon Area Council (#186) in 1929. The council merged into the Winnebago Council (#173) in 1973.

In 1918, the Mason City Council (#173) was founded, changing its name in Cerro Gordo County Council (#173) in 1922, and changing its name again to the North Iowa Council (#173) in 1928. The council changed its name in 1939 to the Winnebago Council (#173).

== Girl Scouting in Iowa ==
Girl Scouting in Iowa
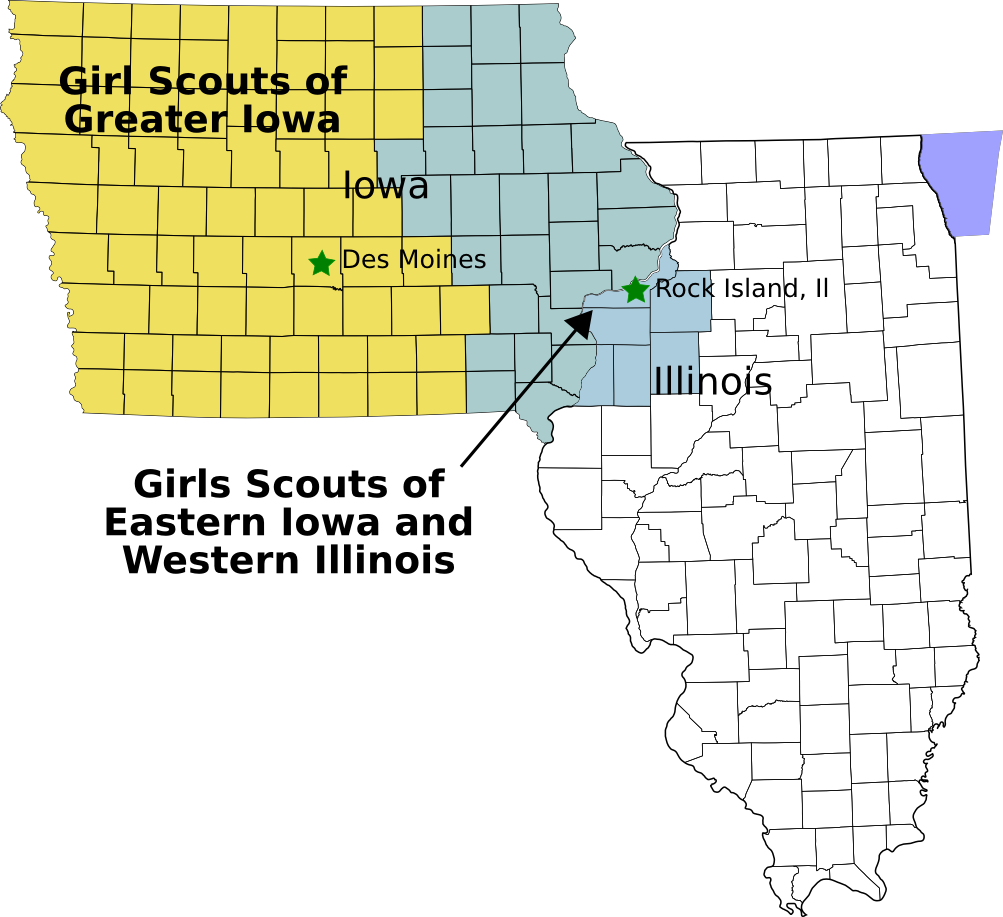
- Map of Girl Scout Council in Iowa

There are two Girl Scout councils in Iowa, realigned from nine former councils.

=== Girl Scouts of Eastern Iowa and Western Illinois ===
As part of a national realignment the Girl Scouts of Eastern Iowa and Western Illinois formed in April 2007 by combining four former councils. It serves some 20,000 girls.

Council headquarters
Rock Island, Illinois
Service centers
Cedar Rapids, Iowa, Dubuque, Iowa, Waterloo, Iowa, and West Burlington, Iowa.

History

The former councils are:

- Conestoga Council of Girl Scouts
  Waterloo, Iowa
- Girl Scouts of Little Cloud Council, Inc.
  Dubuque, Iowa
- Girl Scouts of Mississippi Valley
  Rock Island, Illinois and Cedar Rapids, Iowa
- Girl Scouts of Shining Trail Council, Inc.
  West Burlington, Iowa

Camps

The council has three camps:

- Camp Liberty (formerly Camp Conestoga) is 340 acres (1.4 km^{2}) in New Liberty, Iowa. It was established in 1947.
- Camp Little Cloud is 154 acres (0.6 km^{2}) in Epworth, Iowa.
- Camp L-Kee-Ta established in 1945 is 150 acres (0.6 km^{2}) in Danville, Iowa
- Camp Tahigwa was in Dorchester in Allamakee County, Iowa and had 315 acres (1.3 km^{2}). Tahigwa was established in 1967. This camp was sold in 2017.

Currently, Camp Liberty is the designated resident camp program for girls throughout eastern Iowa and Western Illinois. Camp Little Cloud and Camp L-Kee-Ta are used by troops and groups for events and both day and overnight outdoor adventures.

=== Girl Scouts of Greater Iowa ===
Girl Scouts of Greater Iowa covers 74 counties including 71 in central and western Iowa, one county in Nebraska, and one and one-half counties in South Dakota. As part of the national realignment, Girl Scouts of Greater Iowa was created in October 2007 from the merger of five councils.

Headquarters
Des Moines, Iowa
Service centers
Des Moines, Iowa, Council Bluffs, Iowa, Mason City, Iowa, and Sioux City, Iowa.

History

The five former councils are:

- Girl Scouts of Lakota Council
  Fort Dodge, Iowa
- Moingona Girl Scout Council
  Des Moines, Iowa
- Nishnabotna Girl Scout Council of Southwest Iowa, Inc.
  Council Bluffs, Iowa
- Girl Scout Council of North Iowa
  Mason City, Iowa
- Sioux Trails Girl Scout Council
  Sioux City, Iowa

Camps

The council operates five residence camps.

- Camp Sacajawea is over 400 acres (1.6 km^{2}) in Boone, Iowa.
- Camp Tanglefoot is 50 acres (0.2 km^{2}) in Clear Lake, Iowa.
- Camp Joy Hollow is 360 acres (1.5 km^{2}) in Westfield, Iowa.

Former camps
- Camp Lakota

In the 1970s the Caravan Trails Girl Scout Council owned Camp Strother in Eldon, Iowa.
