= Lincoln Council =

Planned unitary authority in Lincolnshire, England

Area of the possible new council

Lincoln Council was a proposed English unitary authority for the local government district of Lincoln, under expanded boundaries and replacing the existing City of Lincoln Council as well as parts of North Kesteven District Council and West Lindsey District Council. It was planned to have a leader and cabinet model of government. It was to have 65 councillors. The area has a estimated population of 208,249 (2024). Plans to create it were halted in September 2026 and the first election was cancelled. In October 2026, plans to create it were withdrawn.

== Background ==
As part of the Starmer ministry local government reform, a goal of "simpler local government structures" was set out by the government, including a commitment to phase out two-tier local government structures.

=== Timeline ===
On 16 July 2026, the government announced its decision for new authorities to replace the existing councils in Lincolnshire. The first election was set to take place on 6 May 2027, with the authority taking over local government responsibilities on 1 April 2028.

In September 2026, the Lincolnshire proposals were halted by the government and placed under review, with the first election cancelled. In October 2026, plans to create it were withdrawn. The decision was threatened with judicial review by Lincolnshire County Council and South Kesteven District Council.
