= Joseph M. Street =

Iowa pioneer, trader, and US Army officer (1782–1840)

Joseph Montfort Street
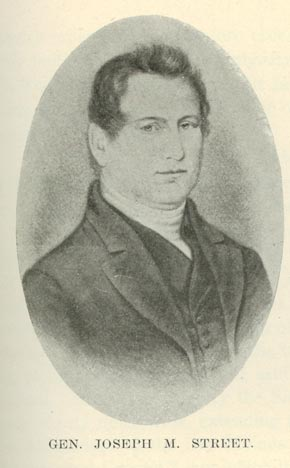
- Born: October 18, 1782; Virginia, United States
- Died: May 5, 1840 (aged 57) near Agency, Iowa
- Other names: Joseph Montford Street; Joseph Monford Street; Joseph Monfort Street
- Occupations: Pioneer, soldier, and businessman
- Known for: Iowa pioneer and one of the earliest to settle in Prairie du Chien; U.S. Indian Agent to the Sauk and Meskwaki after the Black Hawk War.
- Spouse: Eliza Posey
- Parent(s): Anthony and Molly Street
- Relatives: Thomas Posey, father-in-law Alexander Posey, brother-in-law

General Joseph Montfort Street (October 18, 1782 – May 5, 1840) was a 19th-century American pioneer, trader and US Army officer. During the 1820s and 1830s, he was also a U.S. Indian Agent to the Ho-Chunk and later to the Sauk and Meskwaki tribes after the Black Hawk War. His eldest son was Joseph H. D. Street, the first appointed registrar of the Council Bluffs Land Office in western Iowa.

== Biography ==
Born to Anthony and Molly Street in Virginia, he studied law under Henry Clay and traveled to Frankfort, Kentucky, where he became the editor of The Western World in July 1806. The newspaper's "Spanish Conspiracy" series was partially responsible for exposing the Aaron Burr conspiracy. However, he and other members of the paper received lawsuits, threats and challenges to duels until eventually Burr's friends and supporters forced Street to leave for Illinois.

He eventually settled in Shawneetown during the early 19th century, where his father-in-law, Governor Thomas Posey, died of typhus fever at his home on March 9, 1818. Following the death of Nicholas Boilvin in 1827, Street became the U.S. Indian Agent to the Winnebago. He and his family were among the first whites to settle in Prairie du Chien who lacked French, Roman Catholic, or French-Canadian heritage and were among the few Presbyterian families to live in the area. While residing at Prairie du Chien, he was present in 1827 at the signing of the peace treaty ending the "Winnebago War". During his administration, his attempts to help the Winnebago ultimately failed largely due to the interests of the American Fur Company.

In 1829, Major Stephen W. Kearney of Fort Crawford arrested French-Canadian logger Jean Brunett who Street had reported was illegally leading a logging party on an island on the Mississippi River and lay within the Winnebago territory. He and Kearney kept Brunett in custody for a considerable length of time before releasing him; however, the two were sued for illegal arrest and ordered to pay fines and court expenses in excess of $1,374. The presiding judge of the territorial court had ruled that only the President of the United States had the authority to expel a foreigner, even in the process of committing an illegal act, and that the officers' arrest was unlawful unless they had received a presidential order. However, both men were later reimbursed by the United States Congress.

In 1831, Street wrote to U.S. Secretary of War Lewis Cass that when the Sauk, Fox and other tribes had agreed to cede their lands in western Iowa the previous year, a local trader had reported that "The Sacs and Foxes wish to sell to the United States the whole of their country that borders on the Mississippi, but they won't sell unless the commissioners will pay to Messrs. Farnham and Davenport what the Indians owe them."

He and his brother-in-law Alexander Posey both participated in the Black Hawk War and, in the weeks following the Battle of Bad Axe, members of the Sioux delivered 68 scalps and 22 prisoners to him. The Winnebago Prophet and Black Hawk were delivered to him by two Winnebago warriors, One-Eyed Decorri and Cha-e-tar, at the agency headquarters on August 27, 1832. One-Eyed Decorri claimed credit for Black Hawk's capture, telling Street,

Near the Dalle, on the Wisconsin, I took Black Hawk. No one did it but me – I say this in the ears of all present, and they know it – and I now appeal to the Great Spirit, our grand-father, and the earth, our grand-mother, for the truth of what I say.

In a letter sent on September 3, Street reported: "The day after Gen's Scott and Atkinson left this place, I sent out two parties of Winnebagos to bring Black Hawk, the Prophet and Neopope to me." While Black Hawk was being transported by steamship to Galena, Illinois, Street took special care that the prisoners were well-treated. When it was reported to him that iron handcuffs had been riveted on Black Hawk, he ordered officer Jefferson Davis to have them removed.

During 1832 and 1833, he was extensively involved in post-war settlements with the Sac and Fox and was eventually named as a U.S. government liaison and representative of the Sauk and Fox in 1836. The following year, he accompanied a Sauk and Fox delegation to Washington, D.C., where they agreed to relinquish 1,250,000 of their lands in Iowa to the United States, officially signing the "Second Purchase" treaty on October 21, 1837. He later accompanied the Fox chieftain Poweshiek to select a location for the Sac and Fox agency on the Des Moines River. The agency was located on the Lower Des Moines, at the site of present-day Agency City, Iowa. Using money from the U.S. Indian Fund, he oversaw the construction of several buildings, including a small farm for his family when they arrived from Prairie du Chien in April 1838. Recognizing the scarcity of game in the region, he encouraged the federal government to introduce farming to the agency as well as the establishment of Presbyterian missions to provide education to the local tribes.

Street had been in negotiations with the U.S. government on behalf of the Fox and Sauk for another purchase of Sac and Fox lands in Iowa; however, he had been in failing health for some time and died at the agency on May 5, 1840. His son-in-law, Major John Beach, took over his position as agent to the Sac and Fox and hosted a week-long council which resulted in the signing of the treaty on October 11, 1842. One of the clauses requested by the chieftains was a special stipend to be paid to Street's widow.

He was greatly respected among both his contemporaries as well as Native Americans. The war chieftain Wapello, a close personal friend, requested to be buried alongside him in what is now Chief Wapello's Memorial Park.
