= Mid-Iowa Council =

Iowa council of the Boy Scouts of America

Mid-Iowa Council (#177)
- Owner: Boy Scouts of America
- Headquarters: Des Moines, Iowa
- Country: United States
- Membership: 20,000
- Council President: Brian Loffredo
- Council Commissioner: Whit Johnson
- Scout Executive: Matt Hill
- Website www.scoutingiowa.org

The Mid Iowa Council is a council of the Boy Scouts of America that serves all Scouts, adult volunteers and Venturers in Central Iowa. This includes the area of the state capital, Des Moines.

== History ==
In 1914 the Ames Council (#169) was formed, changing its name to the Story County Council (#169) in 1923. The council changed its name again in 1930 to the Tall Corn Area Council (#169). In 1924 the Boone County Council (#170) was formed, merging into the Story County Council (#169) in 1926.

In 1914 the Des Moines Council (#177) was formed, changing its name to the Polk and Jasper Counties Council (#177) in 1926. In 1927, Polk and Jasper Counties Council (#177) changed its name to the Des Moines Area Council (#177) in 1927. In 1924 the Mahaska-Poweshiek-Jasper Counties Council (#183) was formed, merging into the Des Moines Area Council (#177) in 1926.

In 1932, the Des Moines Area Council (#177) and the Tall Corn Area Council (#169) merged to become the Tall Corn Area Council (#177).

In 1927 the Newton City Council (#778) was formed, changing its name to the Tri-Valley Council (#778) in 1929. Newton City merged into the Tall Corn Area Council (#177) in 1931.

In 1924 the Marshall and Tama Counties Council (#658) was formed, changing its name to the Central Iowa Council (#658) in 1925. In 1942 Central Iowa merged with the Tall Corn Area Council (#177).

In 1919 the Ottumwa Council (#194) was formed, changing its name to the Southern Iowa Area Council (#184) in 1928.

In 1970, Southern Iowa Area Council (#184) and Tall Corn Area Council (#177) merged to become the Mid-Iowa Council (#177).

== Organization ==
The council is administratively divided into districts:

- Prairie Winds District Covering the counties of Hamilton, Hardin, Greene, Boone, Story, Marshall, and Tama
- Twin Rivers District Covering the counties of Guthrie, Dallas, Polk, Madison, and Warren
- Woodland Trails District Covering the counties of Jasper, Poweshiek, Marion, Mahaska, Keokuk, Clarke, Lucas, Monroe, Wapello, Jefferson, Decatur, Wayne, Appanoose, Davis, and Van Buren

Theoretically there are two other districts in the council, one each for Venturing and Learning for Life. Inner-city Scouts and Scouters in the Des Moines area were once part of the Two Rivers District. This district has recently been dissolved and the units are now part of the other districts.

== Camps ==
The Mid Iowa Council also manages several properties including Camp Mitigwa, Grinnell Scoutland, and Strother's Lodge. Formerly the council managed Camp Wapello in southeast Iowa. The council now longer uses the property, but it is still used by Scouts and Scouters for various events.

=== Camp Mitigwa ===
Camp Mitigwa is located northeast of Woodward, Iowa, United States, at 1820 Magnolia, north of the state capital in, Des Moines. The camp is approximately 450 acres (1.8 km^{2}) and is situated along the Des Moines River valley. In 1923, Anselm Frankel chaired the committee that, along with Scout Executive Fred G. Davie, found a site of 123 acres located seven miles north of Woodward; just an hour's ride by train or automobile from the city. The purchase price: $25,000.00.

==== Highlights ====
The camp includes Eagle Pond and Lake Fisher. Fisher is a small man made lake which provides opportunities for canoeing, rowing, and fishing. The camp has multiple year-round wood heated cabins available for weekend rentals. The camp also includes a thirty-foot, five-sided Rappelling Tower, as well as a C.O.P.E. (Challenging Outdoor Personal Experience), which includes a 400' zipline, and a triangle event that includes a Gap Step, Balance Beam and Skywalk events. Both the tower and the C.O.P.E. course can be reserved by a troop or crew.

Within the past 10 years the camp has reopened the Frankel Ridge Pool and Trading Post facilities. The camp has also built a new dining facility known as Bear Creek Lodge, a multi-purpose facility used year-round for events and meetings.

Each summer Camp Mitigwa offers five one-week residence camping experiences for Boy Scouts. At the present time Boy Scouts and Cub Scouts camp at the same time.

==== Camp staff and maintenance ====
Summer camp staff is hired only for the summer season and usually consists of 30-60 high school and college students. Positions range from instructing Scouts, managing a trading post, serving as a health officer and life guarding.

Camp Mitigwa has one full-time, year-round camp ranger. He is provided a residence on the camp property. In the past the council has also employed a year-round assistant ranger and a summer seasonal assistant ranger.

ORFs (Old Retired Fellows) is a highly skilled group of volunteers. The men have experience in many trades including plumbing, woodworking, or electrical work and provide maintenance throughout the year. Their work can be seen all over camp and is usually branded with a logo denoting their work.

The Mitigwa Lodge also provides several workdays each year to help maintain the property and has regularly had trail crews present at camp during summer months to improve existing trails and build new ones.

==== Geography ====
Camp Mitigwa has three main ridges, each developed for camping. They are:

- Blank Ridge- Raymond A. Blank Ridge is currently used for Boy Scout Camping and is the central ridge of the camp. The majority of camp activities take place in and around the facilities on this ridge.
- Frankel Ridge- When the camp opened in 1923 Frankel Ridge was opened for Boy Scout camping and was the main ridge for the camp. Since 2007 Frankel Ridge has been utilized primarily for Cub Scout Camping.
- Casady Ridge- Currently used for Boy Scout Camping. This Ridge was originally known as Buffalo Ridge, and still appears on maps this way. The ridge also contains a fort and four adirondacks which can be used by Scouts in camp.

==== Trails ====
- The Lake Front Trail- This trail offers an excellent views of the woodland of Mitigwa between Blank and Frankel Ridges. It goes between the Raymond Blank Memorial Dining Hall and the Frankel Ridge parking lot. The trail also passes by Lake Fisher. This trail was constructed by the Mitigwa Lodge.
- The Dan Beard Trail- The Mitigwa Lodge is currently constructing a trail that will eventually surround the entire camp. Named after Dan Beard, the trail offers an excellent view of the Mitigwa backwoods and the Des Moines River valley. The trail offers access to both outpost campsites on the south end of the property. Hidden treasures such as the Hidden Lake and Sulfur springs are visible from the trail. The trail follows portions of older trails that once went through the camp, old signs can still be found throughout the backwoods of the camp property marking these old trails.

The rest of Camp Mitigwa's 450 acres (1.8 km^{2}) are undeveloped.

==== Campsites ====
Camp Mitigwa utilizes 20 campsites and has at least 4 that are no longer used.

Located on Frankel Ridge: Wakan, Chanotedah, Hopi, and Zuni. Frankel Ridge still has an open space where Cherokee campsite was located near Bear Creek Lodge.

Located on Blank Ridge: Chippewa, Pawnee, Fox, Osage, Piegon, and Sioux. Blank Ridge no longer uses Ottawa, Sac or East Sioux campsites. Ottawa is now used for Eagle Academy (summer of 2024-present). Sac was located too close to the water tower and considered unsafe for usage and East Sioux is now part of the enlarged Piegon campsite.

Located on Casady Ridge: Kick-a-poo, Mohawk, Crow, Onondaga, Onieda, Kiowa, Seneca, Iroquois, Cayuga and Navajo. Navajo is now just used for wilderness survival. There is an existing inactive campsite on the east end of the ridge and the Kiowa campsite was renamed Kiowa in the 1990s.

==== Facilities ====
The camp features two dining facilities, two staff housing areas, two staff lounges, two pools and two trading posts.

There are currently three forts on the property. The first Fort Pella is located on Frankel Ridge. The second Fort Clatsop is located on Casady Ridge. The third is Old Fort Madison located on the far end of Frankel Ridge. A fort known as Fort JC used to exist near the present day Raymond Blank Dining Hall.

All buildings at Camp Mitigwa are painted "Brewer Brown" which is more commonly known as Zanzibar Brown.

Recently Camp has gone through many improvements and renovations specifically improving shower houses and restroom facilities.

Camp also boasts several expensive stone monuments. One located at each of the two west entrances, one large statue inside the main gate, a small monument with directions near the main parking lot and a large monument notating which ridge is Blank and which is Frankel. These monuments were constructed while A Ely. Brewer Jr. was the Scout Executive.

=== Grinnell Scoutland ===
Grinnell Scoutland is 40 acres (160,000 m^{2}) of hardwood timber southwest of Grinnell, Iowa. The camp is ideal for Scouts who want to test their skills in a rustic outdoor environment. Scoutland offers primitive camping in seven campsite, camporee field, and an enclosed shelter house with a fireplace and electricity for weekend camping. Other amenities include water, parade field with flag pole and large parking area.

=== Strother Lodge at Foster Acres ===
Foster Acres is located on the north edge of Ottumwa. Foster acres has a shelter, Strother Lodge, primitive campsites and trails. Strother Lodge is a heated building with kitchen facilities and water. The lodge can be used as a meeting room and has enough room to sleep 20 on the floor as an overnight facility. Strother Lodge is available year-round.

=== Camp Wapello ===
As of 2008 Camp Wapello is no longer being used by the Mid-Iowa Council.

Camp Wapello is located six miles west of Drakesville, Iowa, on the southern end of Wapello State Park. Camp Wapello was founded in 1932 by George Foster, President of the John Morrell Packing company in Ottumwa, IA. Foster donated 88 acres of land to the Southern Iowa Boy Scout Council, then headquartered in Ottumwa. Through the efforts of Foster, the George Foster Fund, the Exchange Bank of Bloomfield, the Union Bank of Ottumwa, and many others, Camp Wapello grew and expanded. In 1965, 80 acres of land was donated from the historic Steckel Ranch, founded during the Civil War.

During the early 1970s the Southern Iowa Council merged with the Tall Corn Council, and formed the Mid-Iowa Council. In 1982, the Mid-Iowa Council sold Camp Wapello to the Iowa Natural Heritage Foundation who in turn sold it to the Department of Natural Resources in 1984. Both purchases were subject to a sublease agreement with the Mid-Iowa Council, BSA to continue usage of the camp as a year-round facility for Scouting programs. In 1992 the property became sole property of the Iowa DNR. The Camp Wapello Preservation Group was formed in 1992. This group purchased Camp Wapello from the Iowa DNR in 1995.

== Order of the Arrow ==
Mitigwa Lodge
- Location: Des Moines, Iowa
- Founded: 1951
- Membership: 650
- Lodge Chief: Sam Orgler
- Lodge Adviser: Jason Kammerer
- Lodge Staff Adviser: Scott Robinson
- Website; ScoutingIowa.org/OA

The Order of the Arrow Scouting's national honor society is represented in the Mid-Iowa Council by the Mitigwa Lodge. The lodge is administratively divided into chapters corresponding to the council's districts. The Mitigwa Lodge is part of Section G-6, in the Gateway Region.

=== History ===
Camp Mitigwa was founded in 1923. The council's first honor society was the Old Guard, founded in 1931. The Old Guard was responsible for camp promotion and improvement, membership retention and service. Mitigwa Lodge was founded in 1951 with 72 members of the Old Guard being inducted by members of the Illini Lodge.

In 1970 the Southern Iowa Council merged with Tall Corn Area Council to form the Mid-Iowa Council. The Bo Qui Lodge then merged with the Mitigwa lodge. The former Bo Qui Lodge.

=== Mitigwa Dancers ===
The Mitigwa Dancers is the Council chapter's dance troupe. Originally organized by John Benton Westfall, the troupe is composed of members of the Order of the Arrow, along with adults, who have an interest in Native American style drumming and dancing. They perform at the annual Snowflake Powwow as well as at other scouting activities. The Dancers program was retired in the Spring of 2021.

=== National Order of the Arrow Conference ===
The Mitigwa Lodge welcomed Arrowmen from around the country to Iowa State University for the National Order of the Arrow Conference (NOAC) both in 1998 and 2004. Serving as the host lodge for both conferences, instead of sending a contingent the Mitigwa Lodge provided hundreds of Arrowmen as part of the service lodge corps.

== See also ==
- Scouting in Iowa
