= Mississippi Valley Council =

Council of the Boy Scouts of America

Mississippi Valley Council (#141)
- Owner: Boy Scouts of America
- Location: Quincy, Illinois
- Country: United States
- Founded: 1993
- President: Dr. Doug Peters
- Council Commissioner: Kevin Dicks
- Website http://www.mississippivalleybsa.org/

Mississippi Valley Council is headquartered in Quincy, Illinois, and is served by Black Hawk Lodge, Order of the Arrow. This council serves Scouts in Illinois, Missouri, and Iowa. The Mississippi Valley Council is one of 14 local Scouting councils in Illinois.

== History ==
In 1917, the Burlington Council (#171) was founded, changing its name to Southeast Iowa Council (#171) in 1929. The Southeast Iowa Council merged with the Saukee Area Council to form Mississippi Valley Council in 1994.

== Organization ==
The Mississippi Valley Council consists of 2 Districts. A District is a geographic area within the local BSA Council. The purpose of the District is to support the local units & provide program opportunities for youth.

- Eagle Valley District serves Adams, Brown, Hancock, Pike, and Schuyler counties in Illinois, Lee and parts of Van Buren county in Iowa, and Clark County, Missouri.
- Shoquoquon District serves Des Moines, Henry, Louisa, and part of Washington county in Iowa and Henderson County, Illinois.

== Camps ==
=== Saukenauk Scout Reservation ===
Saukenauk Scout Reservation is located 25 miles (40 km) north of Quincy, Illinois, and 4 miles (6.4 km) east of Lima, Illinois. It is the property of the Mississippi Valley Council, though it is listed on the property deed as Saukee Area Council. Saukenauk is 602 acres (2.44 km^{2}) that includes four sections.

==== Facilities ====
Camp Illini (referred to as the Main Side) is designed for Scouts BSA Troop long-term camp (summer camp) with a dining hall and all the other program areas needed for a summer camp program. These areas include a 40 acres (160,000 m^{2}) lake with swimming beach and boathouse. A rifle range, health lodge, chapel, trading post, shower house and 11 campsites are some of the other features of this camp.

Camp Illiniwek (referred to as the Jambo Side) is covered with beautiful, huge pines. It was originally designed for troops wishing to do their own cooking. There are seven campsites. Many troops enjoy staying on the Jambo Side of the lake and walking to the main side for meals and program. Jambo side hosts the annual Polar Bear Camporee and hosts the National Youth Leadership Training course.

The rest of Saukenauk is set aside as Camp Iroquois (outside camping) and the Explorer High Adventure Area, all within easy walking distance. Both of these areas are unimproved by man and retain the grandeur and attractiveness of an ancient Eastern Hardwood forest.

=== Camp Eastman ===
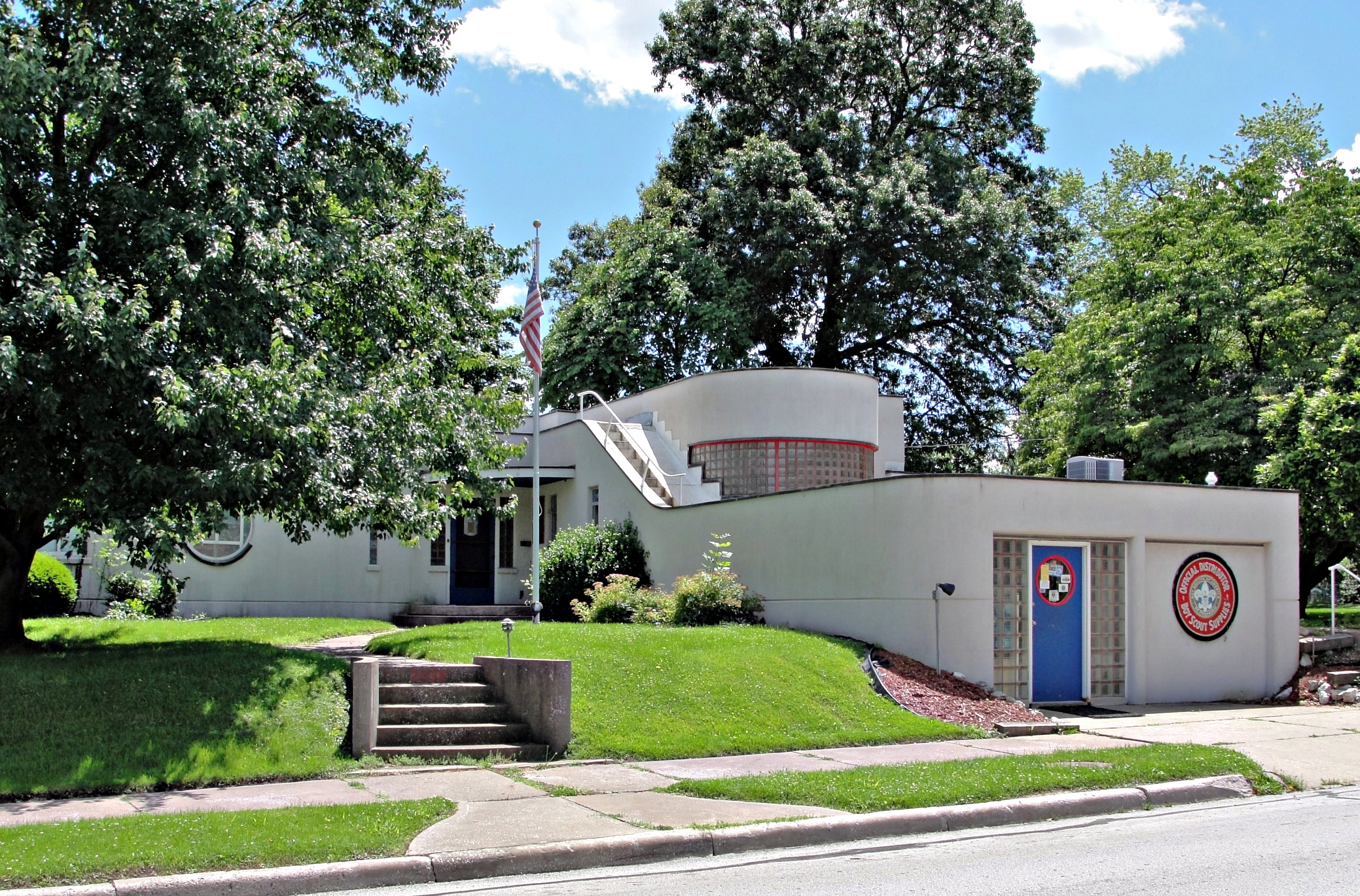
Gardner Memorial Boy Scout Service Center

In 1918 some land was purchased in East Burlington, now known as Gulfport. The Scouts held their 1919-1920 summer camps there. The council desired to move the camp further from Burlington so the council located a spot near Augusta on the Skunk River, and named the camp, Nawakwa. Camp was held there from 1921 to 1924, from there they moved to a location they dubbed Snake Den in 1925.

The Rotary Club sought a more permanent site for a camp. So they appointed a camp site committee to find a site. A party of eleven Rotarians searched diligently, and on May 21, 1926, they came upon a spot 7 1/2 miles (12.1 km) south of Nauvoo, Illinois, at the mouth of Larry's Creek. The committee unanimously agreed to acquire rights to the area by either lease or purchase.

In 1926 the Rotary Club obtained a lease to camp and roam on 80 acres (320,000 m^{2}) of land, which belonged to Mr. George R. Peak. They named the site Camp Burro, for the first three letters of Burlington and the first two of Rotary. The council bought a summer shelter on the property for $450. The shelter had belonged to a Mr. R. A. Pancake of Hamilton, Illinois. The Pancake House or Pancake Cabin served as the first mess hall for what was to be Camp Burro. The first cook was Charlie Slaughter. Later in the year the council built an addition for $200. In 1927 Mr. Pancake leased some more land from Mr. Peak for seven years and built another summer cottage there. Wanting more room for the camp, the Rotary Club bought the cottage, which they named "Rotary Lodge", and the lease for $586. The building served as mess hall for the camp even after it was renamed Camp Eastman, but was moved in 1929. On February 13, 1930, Mr. Peak sold 12½ acres of his land to the Scouts for $1,000. The camp remained Camp Burro from 1926 to 1930.

Around 1930 Mille Smith Eastman became rather interested in Scouting. Her interest in Scouting continued to grow with each succeeding year, and in July 1930 she bought an additional 15 acres (61,000 m^{2}) for the camp from Mr. Roy W. Pilkington. All the other tracts of land composing the camp site have been conveyed by straight warranty deeds and carry no burden. A holding company composed of nine directors was incorporated under the laws of the State of Illinois, on the May 25, 1931, as a non-profit corporation for the purpose of holding the lands and properties of the camp. Said company to be known as the Boy Scout Camp Corporation with its Illinois headquarters located at Hamilton, Illinois. The Rotary Club, up to this point had invested $3,223.80 on land, buildings and equipment. All of this was transferred to the Boy Scouts of America on December 21, 1931, and the camp's name was changed to in July 1930. Mrs. Eastman continued to purchase and add additional tracts to the camp. On December 3, 1936, she bought a tract that gave the camp an unbroken shoreline of 7,250 feet (2,210 m) and a total of 137½ acres of land for the camp. In 1934 Mrs. Eastman began construction on a stone lodge in memory of her husband. She spread the mortar herself and laid the cornerstone in 1935. In 1942 construction took place for a home for the camp ranger. And In 1943 she provided a concrete block building; half to be used for recreation and a canteen and the other half for storage, nicknamed the Bee Hive. The Order of Eagles contributed $800.00 to build four sleeping cabins and later on in 1943, they gave an additional sum to re-roof and refit these buildings. The group of buildings was known as the "Eagles' Nest". The V.F.W. of Mt. Pleasant, Iowa, gave funds for a Troop cabin, which was used to house the summer Camp Staff.

== Order of the Arrow ==
The Mississippi Valley Council is served by the Black Hawk Lodge.

=== Legacy Lodges ===
Maheengun Lodge was originally chartered in 1938 to the Saukee Area Council located in Quincy, Illinois. The totem of Maheengun Lodge was the wolf. In 1994, Saukee Area Council merged with Southeastern Iowa Council to form Mississippi Valley Council. In 1995, the two lodges (Maheengun Lodge and Silver Tomahawk Lodge) merged and became Ka-Ti Mississippi Lodge. In 1997, the lodges were "un-merged" and Maheengun Lodge and Silver Tomahawk Lodge were recharted. In 2000, the lodges were told that the council would only receive one lodge charter for the year 2003. Maheengun Lodge and Silver Tomahawk merged to form Black Hawk Lodge with two chapters, Maheengun Chapter and Silver Tomahawk Chapter. These two chapters were eventually disbanded in 2005 when the Silver Tomahawk Chapter seceded to form the Tribe of the Silver Tomahawk, a local level honor society exclusive to Camp Eastman.

== See also ==
- Scouting in Illinois
