= Winnebago Council =

Local council of the Boy Scouts of America

Winnebago Council (#173)
- Owner: Boy Scouts of America
- Headquarters: Waterloo, Iowa
- Country: United States
- Council President: Stephen Carroll
- Council Commissioner: Aaron Hobert
- Scout Executive: Jim Madison
- Website www.winnebagobsa.org

The Winnebago Council is a council of the Boy Scouts of America (#173). The Winnebago Council serves Scouts BSA, Cub Scouts, adult volunteers and Venturers in 17 counties located in North Central Iowa. Including: Black Hawk, Grundy, Butler, Franklin, Wright, Hancock, Winnebago, Worth, Cerro Gordo, Mitchell, Floyd, Bremer, Chickasaw, Howard, Winneshiek, Fayette, and Buchanan.

== History ==
In 1918, the Jesup Council was founded, folding that same year.

In 1918, the Oelwein Council was founded, folding that same year.

In 1918, the Charles City Council was founded, folding in 1920.

In 1922, the Cedar Falls Council was founded, folding in 1924.

In 1920, the Waterloo Council (#186) was founded, changing its name in Wapsipinicon Area Council (#186) in 1929. The council merged into the Winnebago Council (#173) in 1973.

In 1918, the Mason City Council (#173) was founded, changing its name in Cerro Gordo County Council (#173) in 1922, and changing its name again to the North Iowa Council (#173) in 1928. The council changed its name in 1939 to the Winnebago Council (#173).

== Organization ==
The council is administratively divided into districts:

- Lakeland
- River Valley
- Twin Rivers

== Camps ==
The Winnebago Council owned and operated two camps — Ingawanis Adventure Base near Waverly, Iowa and the Winnebago Scout Reservation near Marble Rock, Iowa. In April 2012, in order to meet a requirement from the National Boy Scouts of America that all camps be self-sustaining, the 31 members of the Winnebago Council Executive Board voted unanimously to sell off the Winnebago Scout Reservation to the Floyd County Conservation Board for $750,000. It is now a county park with public camping areas and land for recreational use, and was renamed the Tosanak Recreational Area. Tosanak is a Winnebago Indians word which translates into "Otter River".

=== Camp Ingawanis ===
Operating since 1924, Located near Waverly, Iowa, Ingawanis Adventure Base is a privately owned Scout Camp owned and operated by the Winnebago Council, Boy Scouts of America for use by Cub Scouts, Scouts BSA, and Venturing Crews; youth groups. Ingawanis Adventure Base is not open to the public without prior authorization from the Winnebago Council. Hunting is prohibited at Ingawanis Adventure Base for both plant and animal life

=== Winnebago Scout Reservation ===
The Winnebago Scout Reservation was a year-round camping facility that was home to the Winnebago Council's Cub Scouts. The camp held Boy Scout Camporees in the Spring and Fall and many other Cub Scout and Boy Scout activities throughout the year.

The Winnebago Scout Reservation had several heated and unheated sleeping cabins that were available year-round, themed campsites with permanent picnic shelters, and many other facilities including: a large dining hall and kitchen, director's lodge building, activity building, heated swimming Pool, shower facilities, BB gun range, archery range, obstacle course, nature building, hiking/biking/skiing trails, mountain bikes, cross country skis and snowshoes. Campsites were given different themes including Native American teepees, covered wagons, mountain man cabins, a Gold Rush town, a fort, and a Hobbit village.

==== History ====
In 1954 the Winnebago Boy Scout council decided to close down Camp Roosevelt due mainly to its small size. It was determined at that time that a new property should be purchased to replace the camp. In 1956 the Council Executive Board met in Marble Rock, IA and voted to establish a new Scout Reservation in the area. They originally purchased 336 acres (136 ha), with an additional 18 acres (7.3 ha) purchased in 1959. The camp was utilized by Scouts for the first time in late 1956. Construction took off in 1957 with a large effort to plant trees in what had been farm fields. Winnebago Scout Reservation began to take shape and Camp Roosevelt was finally closed in 1958. Summer camp took place at the completed Winnebago Scout Reservation for the first time in the summer of 1959 with over 900 Scouts in attendance. Due to decreased attendance and budgetary difficulties, the Winnebago Scout Reservation was sold to the Floyd County Conservation Board in 2012 and repurposed into the Tosanak Recreation Area.

== Order of the Arrow ==
Sac-N-Fox Lodge
- Location: Waterloo, Iowa
- Founded: 1972
- Lodge Chief: Kurtis Bergman
- Lodge Adviser: Chad Blanchard
- The Supreme chief Of The Fire: Jim Madison
- Website www.winnebagobsa.org/oa

The Order of the Arrow Scouting's national honor society is represented in the Winnebago Council by the Sac-N-Fox Lodge. The lodge is administratively divided into chapters corresponding to the council's districts. The Sac-N-Fox Lodge is part of Section G8, in the Gateway Region.

=== History ===
The Sac-N-Fox Lodge #108 arose out of the merger of the Wakosha Lodge #108 based in Waterloo, Iowa and the Aiaouez Lodge #473 based in Mason City, Iowa. The name was chosen to pay tribute to the Indian tribes that once inhabited the area.

The merger of the two lodges was discussed at a mutual Father-son Aiaouez and Wakosha Lodge Winter Banquet on December 19, 1971, and the merger took place at the time when the two respective councils merged in 1972.

=== Lodge flap ===
The Sac-N-Fox Lodge flap was designed by Gary Stattler, The fleur-de-lis symbolizes ties to the Boy Scouts of America and the W.W.W. shows ties to the Order of the Arrow. The council fire in the center of the patch is the lodge's totem, and the two Indians in the patch are exchanging the peace pipe, the symbol of the council. The Thunderbird and the fox head in the patch depict the totems of the Wakosha and Aiaouez Lodges.

== See also ==
- Scouting in Iowa
