= Agency, Iowa =

City in Iowa, United States

- City
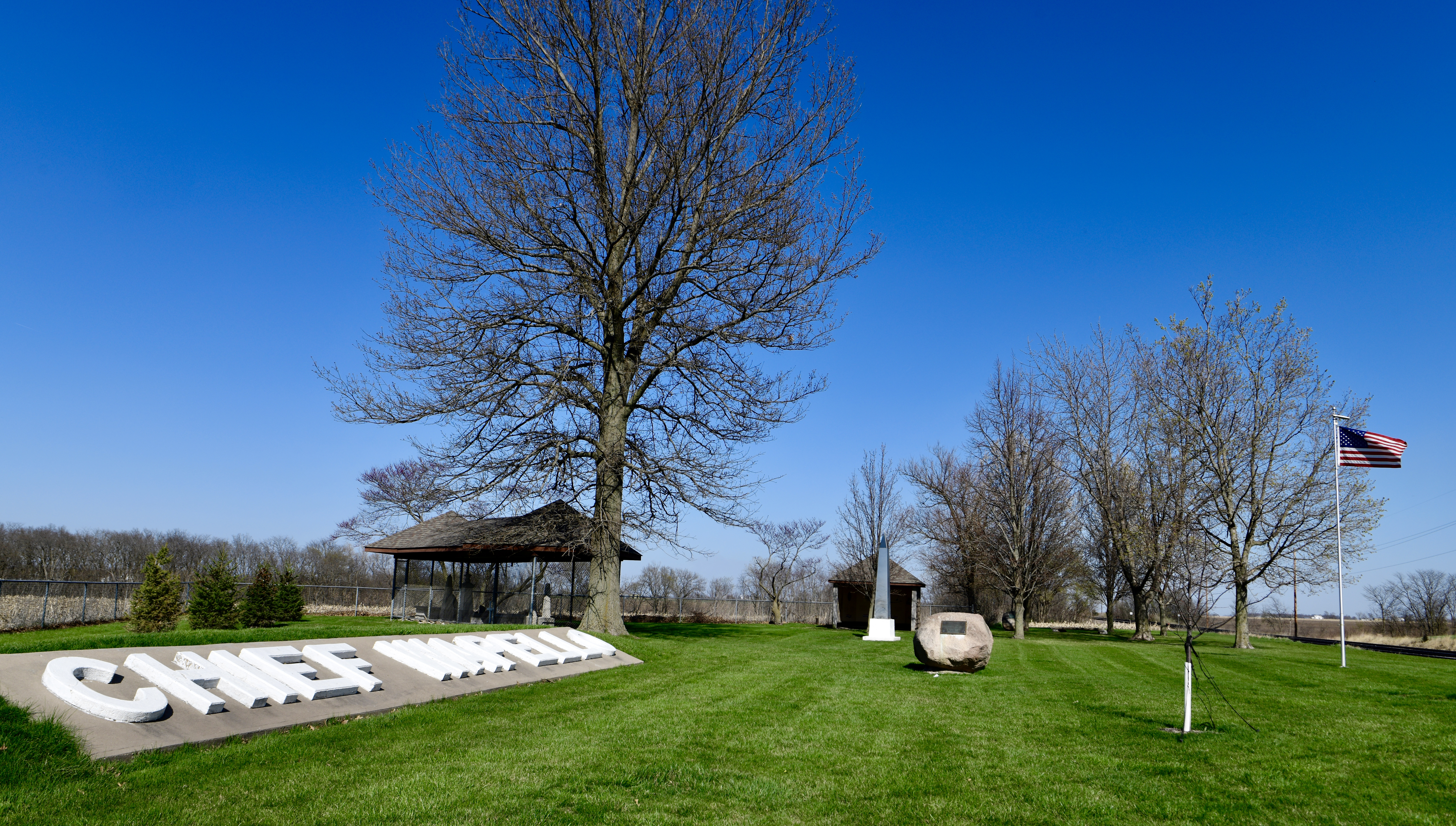
- Chief Wapello Memorial Park and Gravesite

- Location of Agency, Iowa
- Coordinates: 40°59′58″N 92°18′26″W
- Country: USA
- State: Iowa
- County: Wapello

Government
  - Type: Mayor/Council

Area
  - Total: 0.57 sq mi (1.47 km^{2})
  - Land: 0.57 sq mi (1.47 km^{2})
  - Water: 0 sq mi (0.00 km^{2})
- Elevation: 810 ft (250 m)

Population (2020)
  - Total: 620
  - Density: 1,095.9/sq mi (423.12/km^{2})
- Time zone: UTC-6 (Central (CST))
  - Summer (DST): UTC-5 (CDT)
- ZIP code: 52530
- Area code: 641
- FIPS code: 19-00640
- GNIS feature ID: 2393889
- Website: cityofagency.com

Agency is a city in Wapello County, Iowa, United States. The population was 620 at the 2020 census. It is the historic site of an Indian trading post and the grave of Chief Wapello.

== History ==
An Indian agency was established here in 1838 and operated until the local tribes were moved to Kansas. The town was founded on the site of the agency in 1843 and incorporated in 1859.

Agency is the resting place for Chief Wapello. Chief Wapello was second in command in the Sac and Fox tribe, just under Chief Keokuk. Chief Wapello is buried next to his good friend General Joseph M. Street, and his family.

On April 11, 2001, an F2 tornado ripped through Agency destroying or damaging dozens of structures. Two people were killed and three others injured.

== Events ==
Agency, Iowa, hosts an annual street dance, commonly during the evening of July 3rd. On the 4th, the annual Agency 4th of July parade starts at 10 am, followed by other events that, in recent years, have included a car show, a bags tournament, a volleyball tournament, many food and drink vendors, Cardinal Community School District hosted activities (Commonly the dunk tank which features a Cardinal staff member), and inflatable water-slides and bouncy houses.

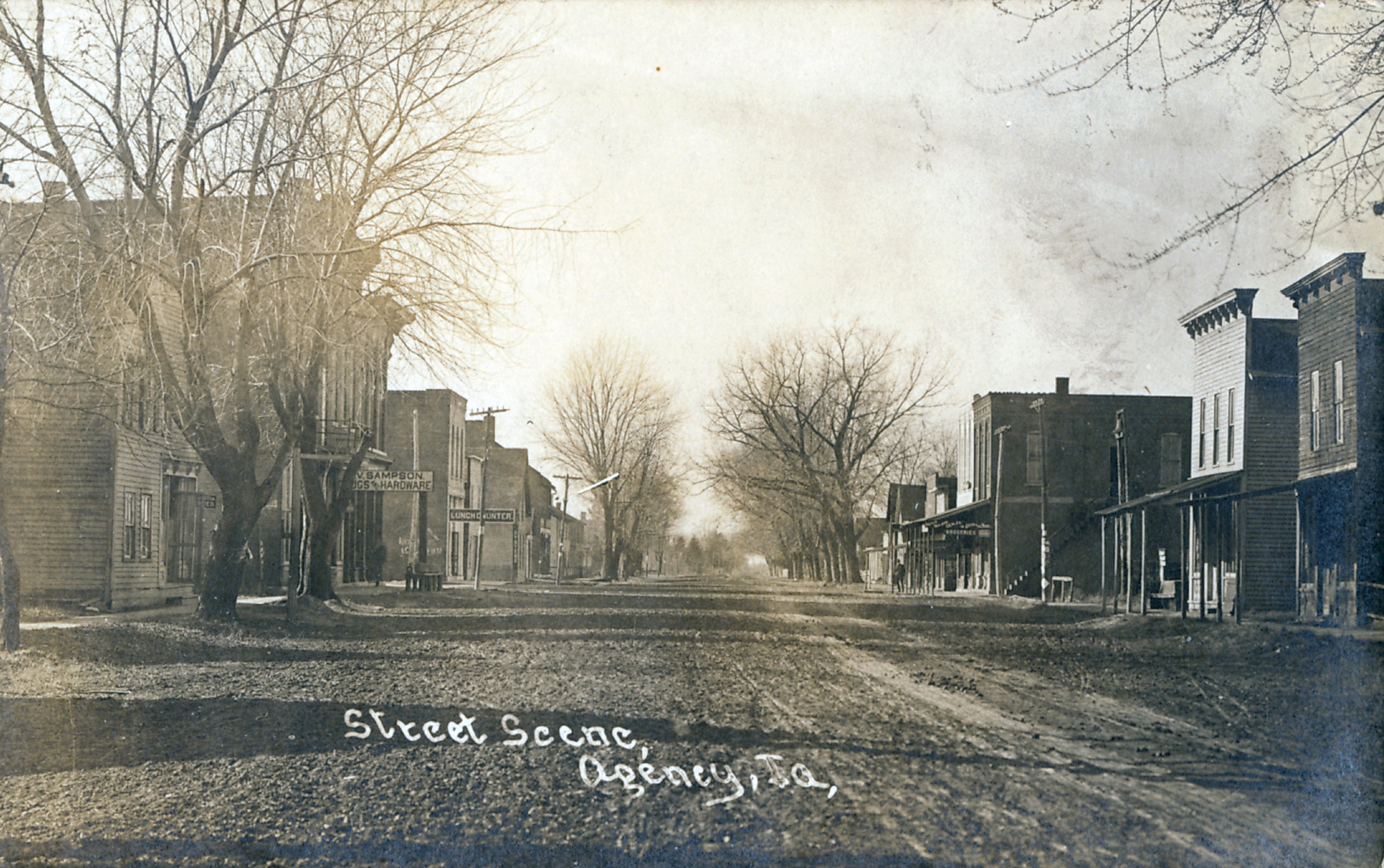
Mainstreet, 1905

== Geography ==
According to the United States Census Bureau, the city has a total area of 0.65 square miles (1.68 km^{2}), all land.

== Demographics ==
Historical populations
Year	Pop.	±%
1870	630	—
1880	566	−10.2%
1890	442	−21.9%
1900	408	−7.7%
1910	322	−21.1%
1920	429	+33.2%
1930	371	−13.5%
1940	452	+21.8%
1950	524	+15.9%
1960	702	+34.0%
1970	610	−13.1%
1980	657	+7.7%
1990	616	−6.2%
2000	622	+1.0%
2010	638	+2.6%
2020	620	−2.8%
Source:"U.S. Census website". United States Census Bureau. and Iowa Data Center; Source: U.S. Decennial Census

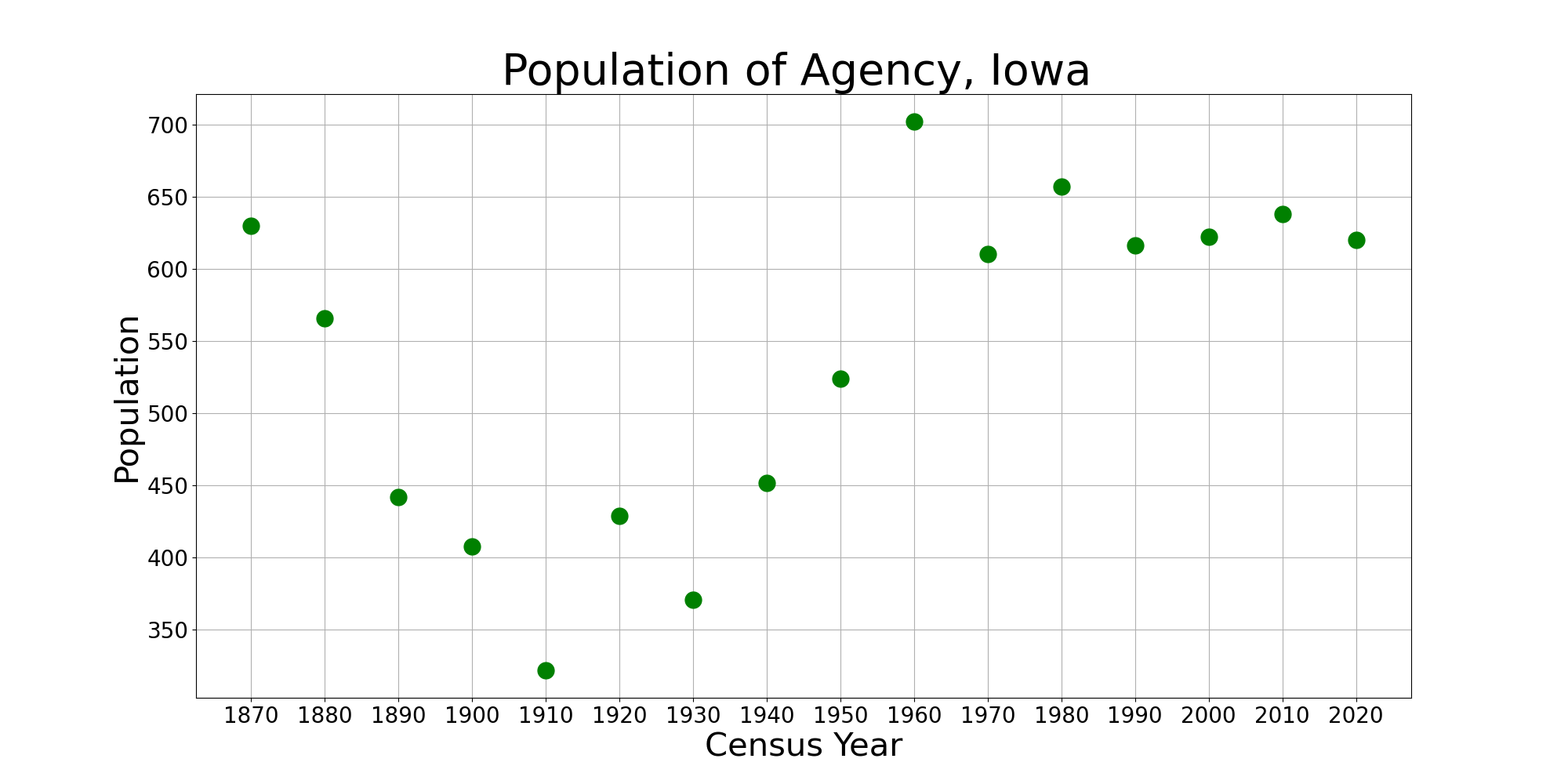
The population of Agency, Iowa from US census data

=== 2020 census ===
As of the census of 2020, there were 620 people, 273 households, and 173 families residing in the city. The population density was 1,095.9 inhabitants per square mile (423.1/km^{2}). There were 293 housing units at an average density of 517.9 per square mile (200.0/km^{2}). The racial makeup of the city was 93.5% White, 0.0% Black or African American, 0.5% Native American, 0.0% Asian, 0.2% Pacific Islander, 2.4% from other races and 3.4% from two or more races. Hispanic or Latino persons of any race comprised 5.2% of the population.

Of the 273 households, 24.9% of which had children under the age of 18 living with them, 45.8% were married couples living together, 9.9% were cohabitating couples, 32.2% had a female householder with no spouse or partner present and 12.1% had a male householder with no spouse or partner present. 36.6% of all households were non-families. 30.8% of all households were made up of individuals, 21.2% had someone living alone who was 65 years old or older.

The median age in the city was 47.2 years. 22.1% of the residents were under the age of 20; 7.1% were between the ages of 20 and 24; 19.0% were from 25 and 44; 26.5% were from 45 and 64; and 25.3% were 65 years of age or older. The gender makeup of the city was 46.8% male and 53.2% female.

=== 2010 census ===
As of the census of 2010, there were 638 people, 277 households, and 189 families living in the city. The population density was 981.5 inhabitants per square mile (379.0/km^{2}). There were 306 housing units at an average density of 470.8 units per square mile (181.8 units/km^{2}). The racial makeup of the city was 97.6% White, 1.3% Native American, 0.2% from other races, and 0.9% from two or more races. Hispanic or Latino of any race were 2.4% of the population.

There were 277 households, of which 27.8% had children under the age of 18 living with them, 54.2% were married couples living together, 8.7% had a female householder with no husband present, 5.4% had a male householder with no wife present, and 31.8% were non-families. 27.8% of all households were made up of individuals, and 12.7% had someone living alone who was 65 years of age or older. The average household size was 2.30 and the average family size was 2.75.

The median age in the city was 44.6 years. 20.4% of residents were under the age of 18; 7% were between the ages of 18 and 24; 22.9% were from 25 to 44; 27.2% were from 45 to 64; and 22.3% were 65 years of age or older. The gender makeup of the city was 48.9% male and 51.1% female.

=== 2000 census ===
As of the census of 2000, there were 622 people, 272 households, and 178 families living in the city. The population density was 1,074.6 inhabitants per square mile (414.9/km^{2}). There were 286 housing units at an average density of 494.1 units per square mile (190.8 units/km^{2}). The racial makeup of the city was 99.20% White, 0.16% African American, 0.48% Asian, 0.16% from other races. Hispanic or Latino of any race were 0.80% of the population.

There were 272 households, out of which 23.9% had children under the age of 18 living with them, 58.5% were married couples living together, 5.9% had a female householder with no husband present, and 34.2% were non-families. 31.6% of all households were made up of individuals, and 17.6% had someone living alone who was 65 years of age or older. The average household size was 2.29 and the average family size was 2.89.

Age spread: 22.5% under the age of 18, 5.1% from 18 to 24, 26.0% from 25 to 44, 24.3% from 45 to 64, and 22.0% who were 65 years of age or older. The median age was 43 years. For every 100 females, there were 92.0 males. For every 100 females age 18 and over, there were 84.7 males.

The median income for a household in the city was $36,912, and the median income for a family was $44,306. Males had a median income of $29,107 versus $26,750 for females. The per capita income for the city was $16,896. About 2.2% of families and 5.3% of the population were below the poverty line, including 8.7% of those under age 18 and 5.9% of those age 65 or over.
