= Alfred Hoffy =

American lithographer (1796–1872)

Alfred A. Hoffy (1796–1872) was a mid 19th-century American lithographer and botanical illustrator who founded the first American periodical devoted solely to fruit cultivation. Born in London, he immigrated to New York City in 1830 after serving for years in the British Army and reaching the rank of major. He became a lithographer with J.T. Bowen in New York; later the partners moved to Philadelphia.

Hoffy founded a quarterly journal, Hoffy's Orchardist's Companion, and illustrated it with high-quality plates, but found it too expensive to sustain. Later he worked on another publication about American fruits, North American Pomologist, with William D. Brincklé. They published a compilation in 1860 of the entire series.

== Early life ==
Alfred Hoffy was born in London, England, in 1796. As a young man he joined the British Army and rose to the rank of major. He fought in the Battle of Waterloo, during which he served as an aide-de-camp to the Duke of Wellington, and later commanded his own regiment.

== Early career ==
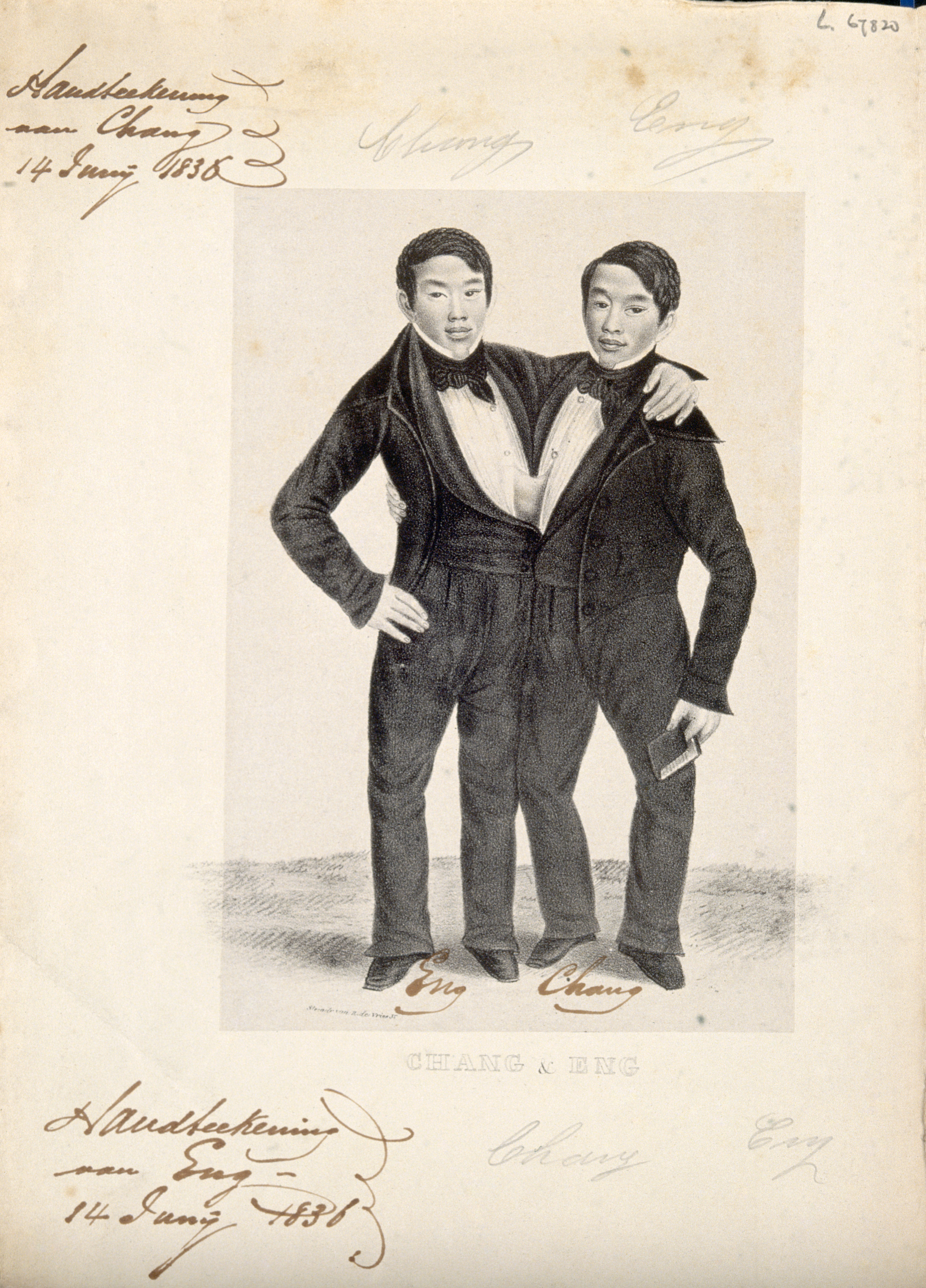
Siamese twins Chang and Eng, promotional lithograph by Alfred Hoffy, c.1836–37

In 1830, Hoffy left the army and emigrated to the United States, landing in New York City, where he went into business with the British lithographer J.T. Bowen. In 1837, Hoffy created a well-known lithographic portrait of the conjoined twins Chang and Eng Bunker. Around 1838, Bowen and Hoffy moved their lithography business to Philadelphia, where Hoffy created lithographic illustrations for the local newspaper, The North American. His subjects ranged from news events—the arrival of an Egyptian sarcophagus in Philadelphia; the 1835 Great Fire of New York—to portraits drawn from daguerreotypes of such well-known people as General Santa Anna and financier Cyrus West Field. He also produced many of the plates for the fashion periodical U.S. Military Magazine published by Duval and Huddy between 1839 and 1842. He produced numerous lithographic plates of Native American chiefs, based primarily on paintings by Charles Bird King, to Thomas McKenney and James Hall's History of the Indian Tribes of North America (1837-1842).

== Holly's Orchardist's Companion ==
Hoffy was very interested in fruit production in America, and in the early 1840s, he founded a periodical on American fruit. He illustrated it with color plates that he intended would match the quality of those found in European journals. Hoffy's Orchardist's Companion: A Quarterly Journal, Devoted to the History, Character, Properties, Modes of Cultivation, and All Other Matters Appertaining to the Fruits of the United States was praised in the local and national press for its usefulness and especially for the "superb colored engravings of fruits". Despite the praise, Hoffy published only five issues over two years (1841–43) before ending production, as it was too expensive and he could not cover his costs by subscriptions. Hoffy's Orchardist's Companion was the first American periodical devoted solely to fruit cultivation.

== North American Pomologist ==
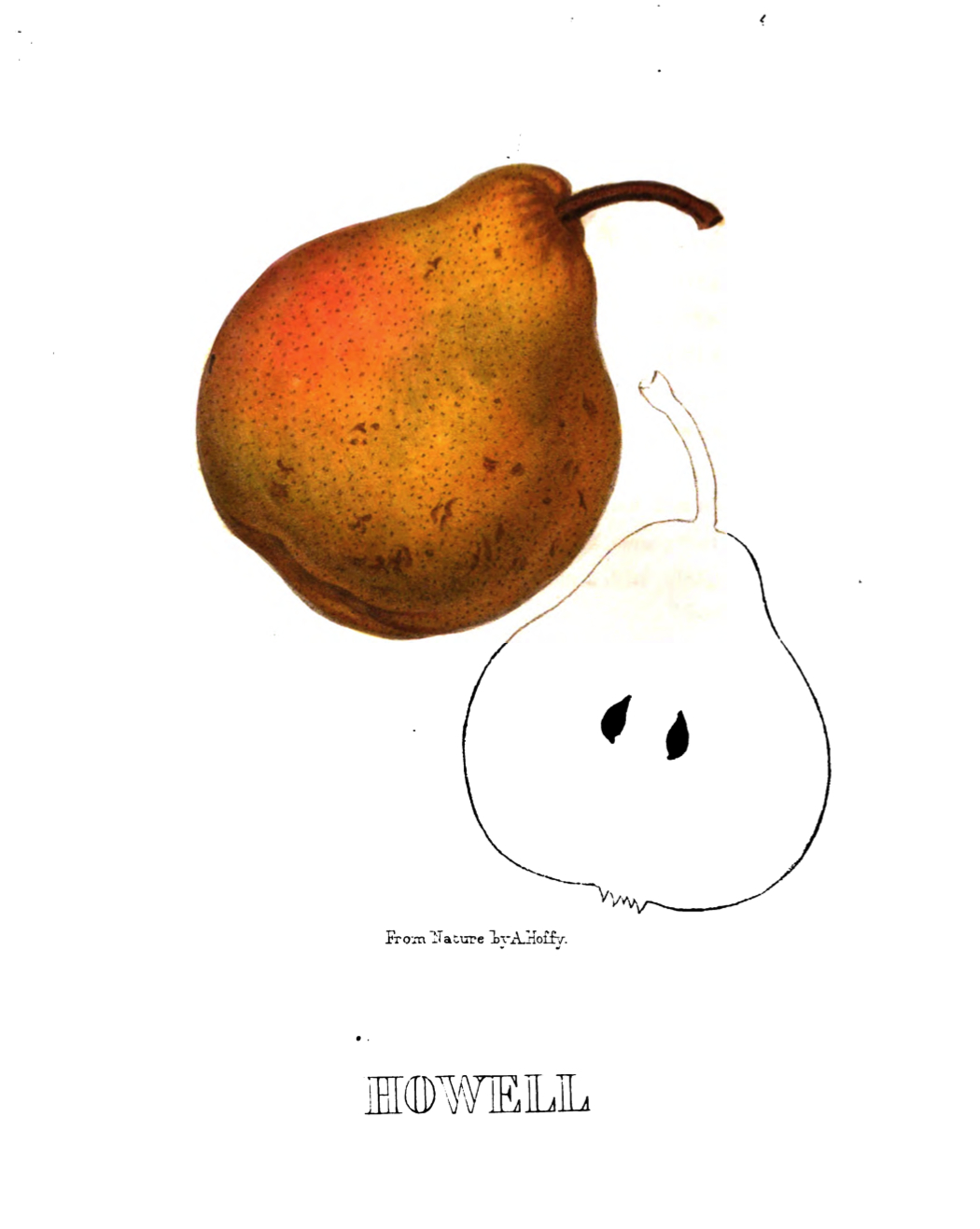
Lithograph of Howell pear by Alfred A. Hoffy, from Hoffy's North American Pomologist, 1860.

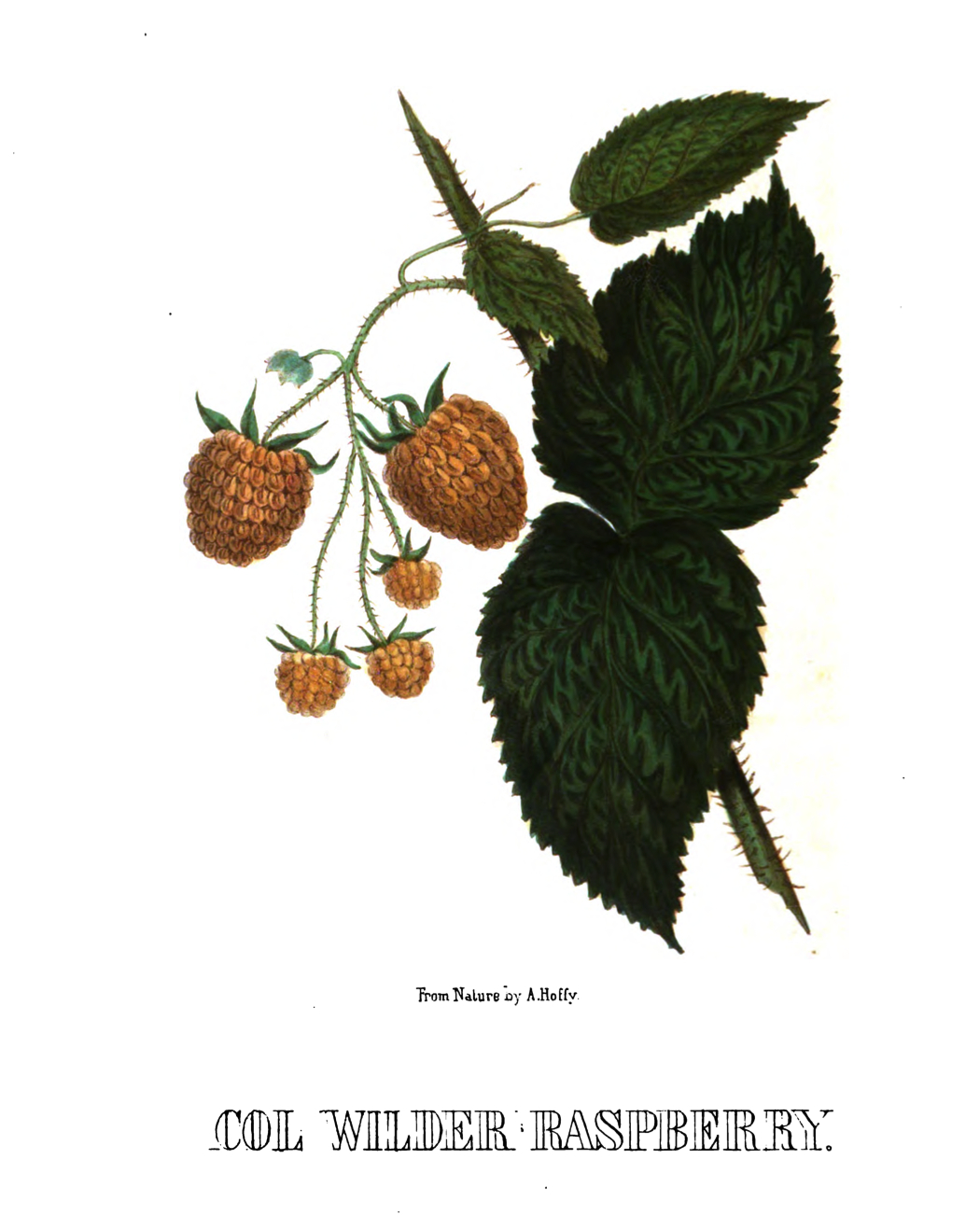
Lithograph of Col. Wilder raspberry by Alfred A. Hoffy, from Hoffy's North American Pomologist, 1860.

Following this, Hoffy began work with William D. Brincklé, a physician and amateur pomologist, on a new series of publications on native North American fruits, to be published under the general title North American Pomologist. Individual volumes would be edited by Brincklé (who was for many years the vice-president of the Philadelphia Horticultural Society). Each was planned to have 36 pages of information on different kinds of fruit, illustrated with 10 color plates. The illustrations were produced as stone lithographs drawn by Hoffy (signed "From Nature by A. Hoffy") and colored under his direction. The fruit is usually shown in a full-color side view, sometimes accompanied by a simple black outline of the fruit's profile.

Hoffy and Brincklé believed that this series was needed because of "repeated disappointments which have attended the cultivation of Foreign Fruits in this country" and also to clear up increasing confusion over common fruit names. The entire series was published in 1860 in a single volume as Hoffy's North American Pomologist.

== Family and death ==
In Philadelphia, Hoffy married Emma Jane Patterson. They had six daughters and two sons together. In the late 1860s, Hoffy moved his family to Brooklyn, New York. He died there on March 10, 1872. He is buried in Green-Wood Cemetery.

== Gallery ==
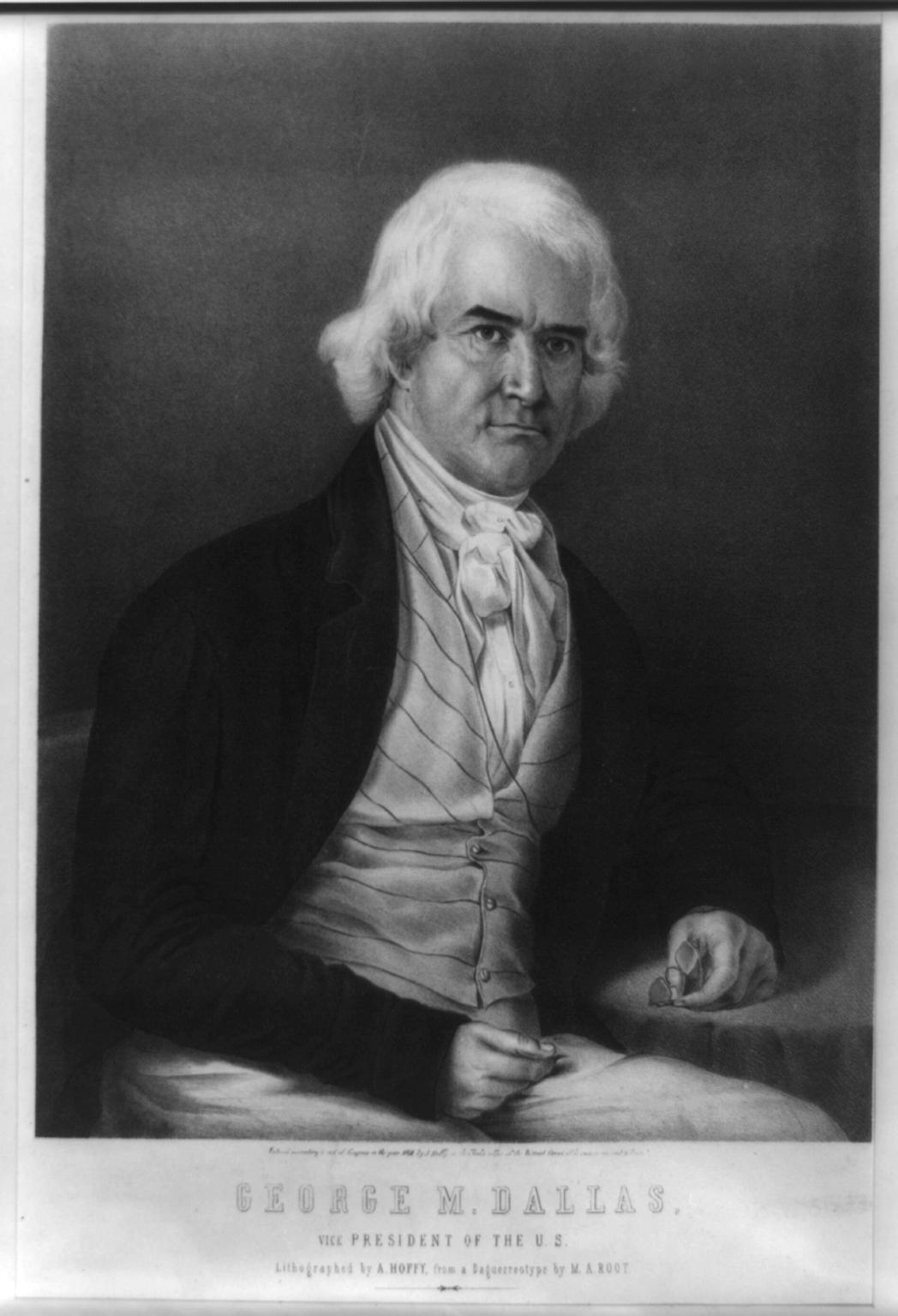
U.S. Vice-President George Mifflin Dallas in a lithograph by Alfred Hoffy after a daguerreotype by M.A. Root
