= Albert Newsam =

American lithographer and painter (1809–1864)

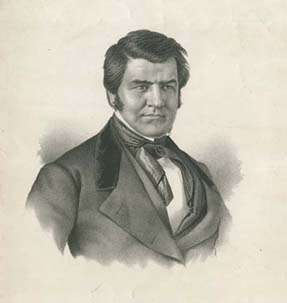
- Albert Newsam, circa 1850
- Born: May 20, 1809; Steubenville, Ohio, U.S.
- Died: November 20, 1864 (aged 55); Wilmington, Delaware, U.S.
- Resting place: Laurel Hill Cemetery, Philadelphia, Pennsylvania, U.S.
- Education: Pennsylvania School for the Deaf
- Known for: Engraving

Albert Newsam (May 20, 1809 – November 20, 1864) was an American lithographer and painter. He was born deaf in Steubenville, Ohio, and orphaned as a small child. He displayed artistic talent at an early age, was brought to Philadelphia, Pennsylvania, and studied at the Pennsylvania School for the Deaf. He was an early practitioner of lithography in the United States and contributed numerous images to medical and sheet music books. His portrait work of prominent politicians, doctors, lawyers and businessmen raised the prominence of lithography in the United States.

== Early life and education ==
Newsam was born in Steubenville, Ohio, on May 20, 1809, to William Newsam and an unknown mother. He was born deaf and orphaned when his father drowned when Newsam was a small child. He was taken in by a local hotel owner, Thomas Hamilton. Newsam displayed artistic talent at an early age through chalk and pencil sketches.

When Newsam was ten years old, a William P. Davis stayed at Harrison's hotel while passing through town and took note of Newsam's artistic talent. Davis portrayed himself as a fellow deaf mute and convinced Harrison that he would take Newsam and provide for him. Davis took Newsam to Philadelphia. He presented Newsam as his brother and capitalized on his artistic ability to collect charitable donations.

In Philadelphia, Newsam captured the attention of Bishop William White through a chalk drawing on a police box outside of the boarding house where he was staying. Bishop White was the president of the newly founded Pennsylvania School for the Deaf, and obtained a spot for Newsam at the school. Newsam attended from 1820 to 1826 as a ward of the state and trained under George Catlin. Davis left Newsam behind at the institution, purportedly to travel to Richmond, Virginia to search for other relatives, and was not seen again.

== Career ==
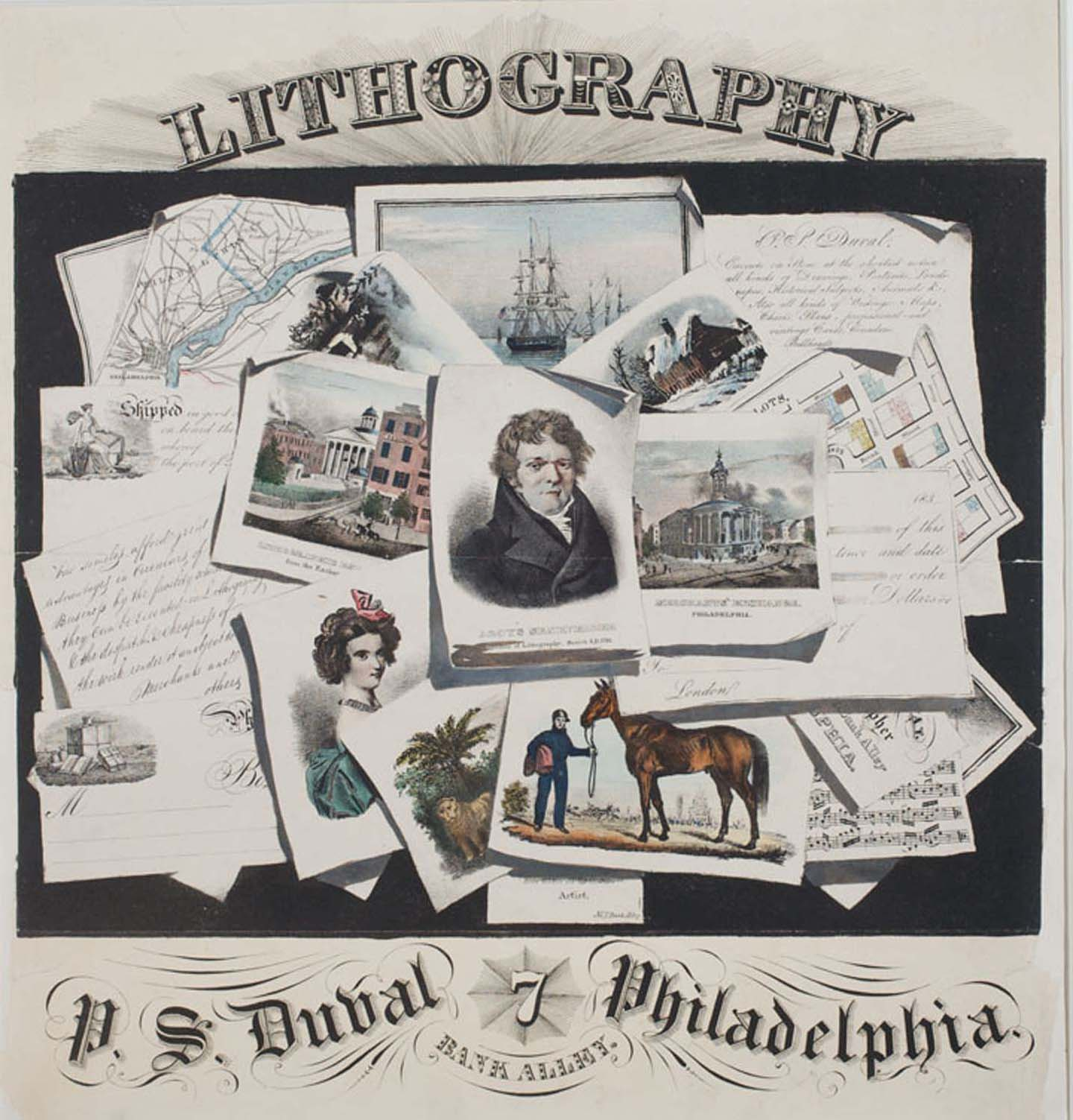
An Advertisement for P.S. Duval including Newsam's Lithography

He started an engraving apprenticeship in 1827 under the tutelage of Cephas G. Childs and was taught the art of engraving on copper. Pendleton's Lithography had moved their operations from Boston to Philadelphia and began a business under the name Pendleton, Kearney and Childs. They began to implement lithography into the business and hired P.S. Duval from Europe to implement the technique. Newsam learned the technique of drawing upon stone from Duval and became renowned for his portraiture. Newsam's work was first published by Childs starting in 1829. Newsam is credited with raising the prominence of lithography in the United States. Childs left the business in 1835 and Newsam continued to work for the successor organization, Lehman & Duval which became P.S. Duval in 1837.

Newsam specialized in portraits, which he painted and also etched on stone to make lithographs. His portrait subjects included doctors, judges, lawyers and local merchants. His political subjects include eight Pennsylvania governors from George Wolf through William F. Packer and fifteen U.S. Presidents from George Washington through James Buchannan. He often copied from the work of other painters including Henry Inman, Charles Bird King, Gilbert Stuart and Thomas Sully. His lithograph of a portrait of David Crockett painted by Samuel Stillman Osgood was published in 1834 with the endorsement underneath that it was the "only correct likeness that has been taken of me."

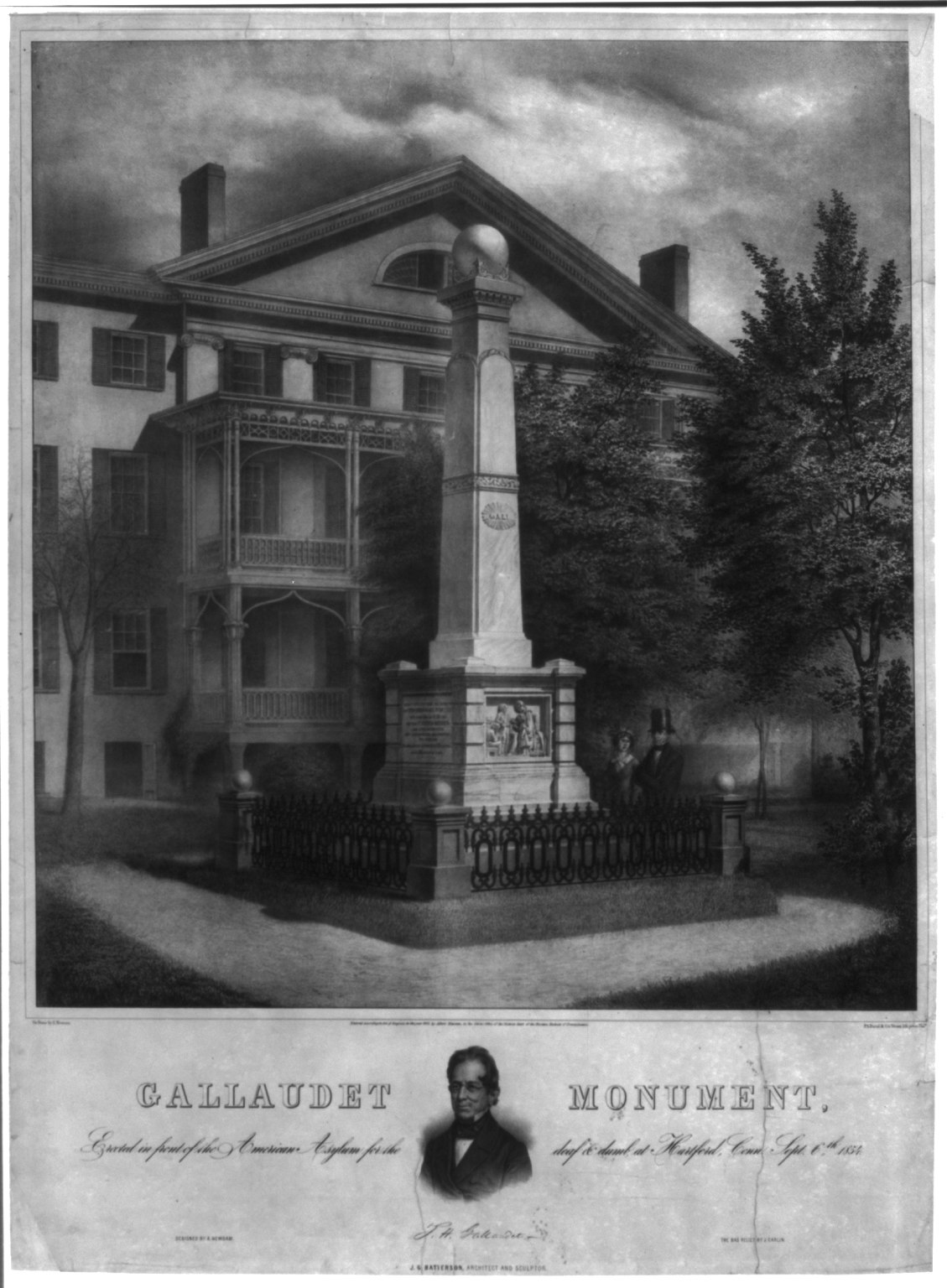
Newsam's lithograph of the 1854 Monument to Thomas Galludet in Hartford, Connecticut

He created images for Thomas McKenney and James Hall for their book History of the Indian Tribes of North American. He also created landscapes, medical illustrations and images for sheet music. His images were included in medical books published in Philadelphia including Treatise on Operative Surgery, Series of Anatomical Plates and A Theoretical and Practical Treatise on the Diseases of the Skin. He created images of a locomotive for William Norris. In 1853 an exhibition of designs for the monument in Hartford, Connecticut of the educator of the deaf, Thomas Galludet was held. A design by Newsam was accepted along with a picture by John Carlin. Carlin and Newsam were present at the monument's dedication on September 6, 1854. At the age of 44, Newsam also turned to oil painting. In 1855 he became a student of the portrait painter R. J. Lambdin, but he was no longer able to use his new knowledge extensively due to his health worsening.

== Later life, death, and legacy ==
His eyesight started to decline in 1857. In 1859, Newsam suffered a stroke and one side of his body was paralyzed. This affected his ability to work, and ended his career. He had limited savings and he was hospitalized at the Blockley Almshouse until 1862. Friends were able to raise funds and move him to the Living Home for the Sick and Well near Wilmington, Delaware. He died on November 20, 1864, and was interred at Laurel Hill Cemetery in Philadelphia. A collection of his prints is held by the Historical Society of Pennsylvania.
