= Sacred Sun =

Osage woman (1809–1836)

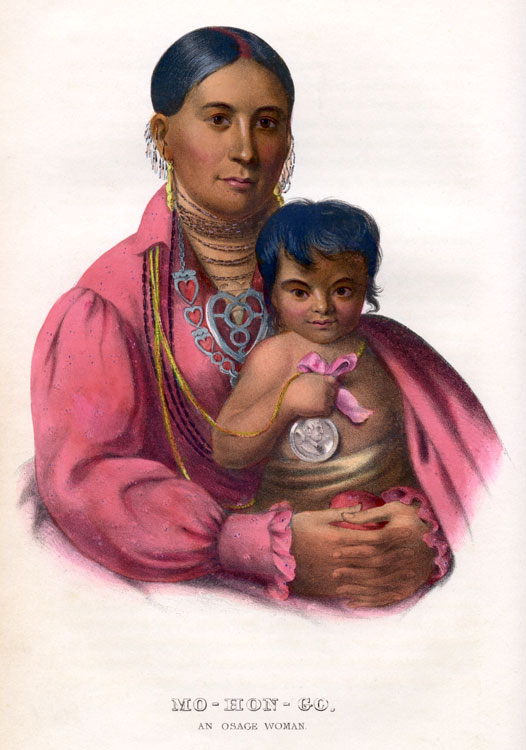
Sacred Sun and her child, abt. 1830

Sacred Sun (Mohongo) (1809–1836) was an Osage woman who lived on Osage land in what is now Missouri, US. She took a journey all throughout Europe, and tales of her trip were recorded in French and American newspapers and pamphlets of that age. After returning to the United States, her portrait was painted and hung up for display in Washington D.C. to show off her skills and determination.

== Early life ==
Sacred Sun was born in 1809 in what is now Saline County along the Missouri River in Missouri. Her Osage name was Mi-Ho’n-Ga. As a baby, Sacred Sun and other Osage children were strapped to a tree branch on a board while their mothers worked tending gardens, preserving food, and doing other domestic work. By the age of 12 Sacred Sun was expected to do her share of work. She knew how to care for children, sew, hunt, and preserve meat and food. According to her culture, it is likely her father arranged a husband for her around the age of 14.

== Journey ==
In 1827, Sacred Sun was 18 years old when she was taken to France with eleven other people from her tribe by David de Launay. De Launay, a French-born resident of St. Louis, presented himself as a representative of the American Government and a friend of two people who were going to take a group of Osage to Washington, D.C. However, he instead took them to Europe and used them for his own pleasure and profit. De Launay gathered the 12 people and loaded their furs onto a raft and set off for St. Louis. Halfway there their raft crashed and all of their furs were lost. Half of the Osage decided to return to the village at this point, while the other half including Sacred Sun continued on the planned journey. This group included five other Osage Native Americans: Little Chief, Hawk Woman, Black Bird, Minckchatahooh, and Big Soldier. They joined de Launay in St. Louis, and boarded a steamboat that took them down the Mississippi to New Orleans, from whence they set sail for France.

== In France ==
Sacred Sun and the rest of the trip members arrived in France on July 27, 1827 where they were greeted at the court of King Charles X by many excited and curious French citizens and showered with gifts. They asked for food and drink and were served many kinds of wine. At first, the King himself even expressed how pleased he was to have them there and how he was satisfied. He told how the Osage had always been faithful to France, and how he hoped that they were turn out to be equally faithful allies to the United States. Sacred Sun was seen as extremely beautiful by the people of France, and they took a liking to her. It was only after all the Indians arrived and had been greeted that they realized they would be a part of a "Wild West Show" and this was the main reason for their journey.

== Hardships ==
After the popularity of the Indian tribe wore off, de Launay went broke and was imprisoned for not paying his debts, leaving the tribe on their own. At first, they refused to beg for food so they had nothing to eat. During the time of her journey, Sacred Sun was pregnant with twins and she wanted to go home to be able to care for them. On February 8, 1828 she gave birth to her twin daughters in a hotel room in Belgium. Both girls were named traditional French names, and Sacred Sun decided to let a wealthy French woman adopt one daughter while she kept the other. Sacred Sun and the other members of her Osage tribe spent two years wandering alone through France, Holland, Germany, Belgium, Switzerland, and Italy. They spent time begging for food and places to sleep at night, but eventually they had a saving grace. A local newspaper wrote about their struggles, and French royalty came to their rescue. The Marquis de LaFayette sent Sacred Sun, her baby and another tribe member Little Chief or Kihegashugah back to America on a ship. Unfortunately, Minckchatahooh, was killed on the journey back home due to smallpox. But Sacred Sun and her baby arrived safely in Virginia in 1829. Her husband and others followed a few months later.

== Legacy and death ==
Once she arrived home, Sacred Sun and her baby were idolized by many. The Superintendent of Indian Trade, Thomas L. McKenney, had the artist Charles Bird King paint a portrait of Sacred Sun and her baby. It was hung in the National Indian Portrait Gallery for 36 years until it was destroyed by a fire. Thankfully, this portrait can still be found in the book History of the Indian Tribes of North America because copies of all portraits were made before the fire. In the summer of 1830 Sacred Sun traveled back to St. Louis where she and her child lived until her death. Sacred Sun was said to have died in 1836 at the age of 27.
