= Big Soldier =

Wazhazhe leader (c. 1773–1844)

Mo'on-Sho'n A-ki-da Tonkah
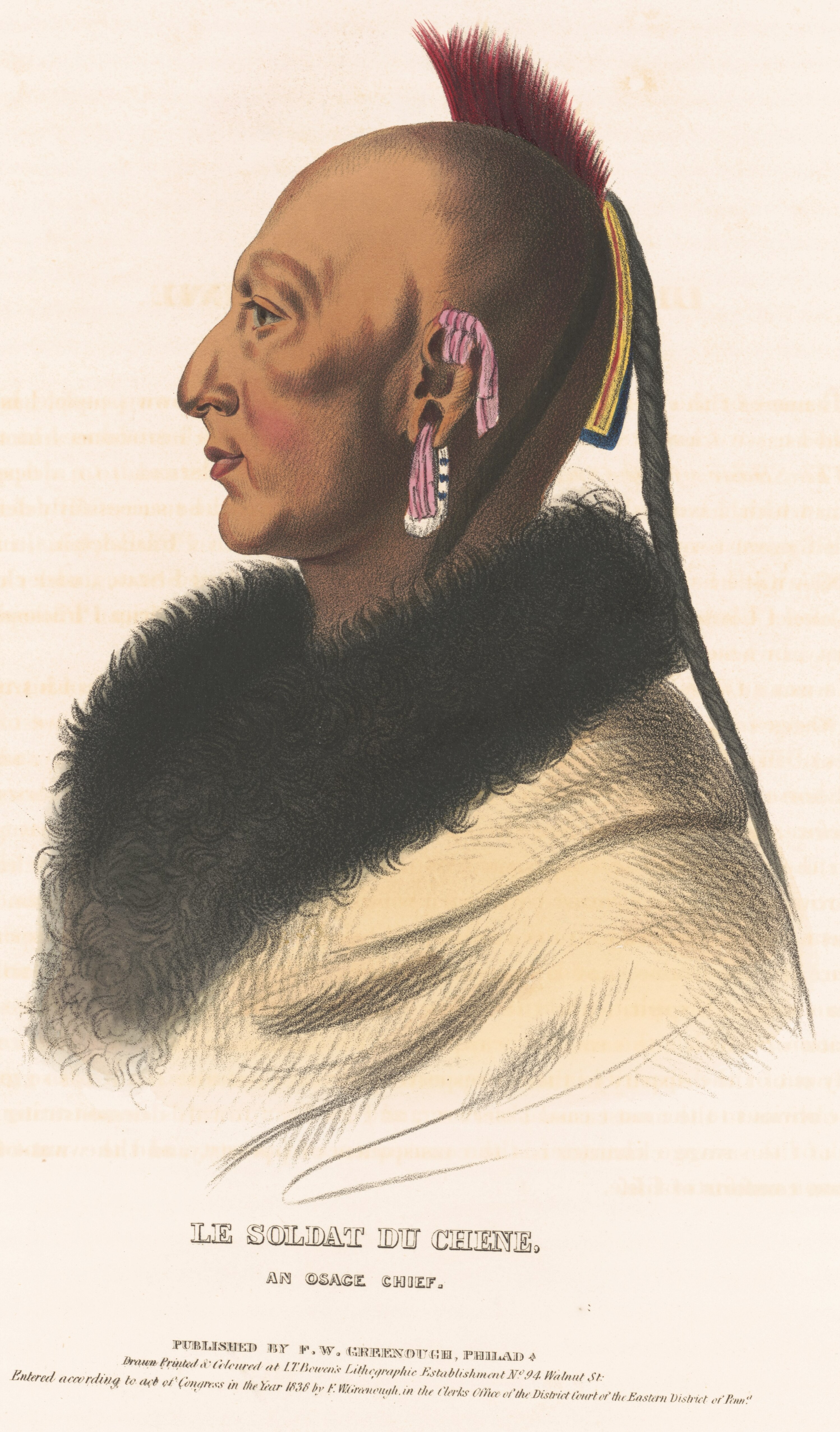
- Born: c. 1773
- Died: 1844

Mo'on-Sho'n A-ki-da Tonkah (c. 1773–1844), also known as Le Soldat du Chêne (lit. 'The Oak Soldier', if Soldat du Chene, or lit. 'Dog Soldier', if Soldat du Chiene), and Big Soldier, was a chief of the Little Osage (Wazhazhe) group of the Osage people of North America. The Missouri Encyclopedia reports that variant spellings of his native name include Mo’n-Sho’n A-ki-Da Tonka (Great Protector of the Land), Marchar-thitah-toogah, Nikaouassatanga, Manuaquida’, and Mant sa.

== Biography ==
He was probably from the vicinity of what is now Saline County, Missouri, near the Missouri River. A Little Osage chief called "Dog Soldier" was among those Osage who met with Thomas Jefferson. His likeness was made in Philadelphia in 1804 or 1805, painted in watercolor by Charles Balthazar Julien Févret de Saint-Mémin. He was part of a delegation of Osage and Pawnee people visiting American politicians. He wears "a fur-collared buffalo hide robe, and his head is shaven in the traditional Osage fashion that preserved only a central hair lock. The roach headdress attached to his hair lock creates the illusion of human hair standing on end. In this case, the roach is likely made from the dyed tail fur of a white-tailed deer and the guard hairs of a porcupine." The picture by de Saint-Mémin is one of the earliest recorded images of an Osage person. A lithograph of this image is plate 5 in folio 13 (P27770) of McKenney and Hall's History of the Indian Tribes of North America.

He participated in the Treaty of Fort Osage in 1808. The Osage lived in what is today Missouri, and "were the most powerful tribe in the lower Midwest in the late 1700s because of its established relationships with French fur traders and Spanish government officials in St. Louis, which enabled them to trade for firearms. Intermarriage between the French fur traders and the Osage women also strengthened those alliances." The Americans were less cooperative, and Louisiana territorial governor Meriwether Lewis imposed the treaty, transferring 52 million acres of land to the U.S. government.

American administrator George Champlin Sibley considered Chief Ne-zumone, Sans Oreille, and Big Soldier the leading figures in the tribe during the "Osage factory" era of 1808 to 1822. Big Soldier and several others took a three-year sojourn in France between 1827 and 1830; their sponsor was jailed as a debtor and they had no means of returning to North America until the Marquis de Lafayette and others raised funds for a return trip. Portraits of Big Soldier were painted in France and by John Mix Stanley. Big Soldier died in 1844.

== See also ==
- David de Launay

== Sources ==
- Rollings, Willard H. (1992). The Osage: an ethnohistorical study of hegemony on the prairie-plains. Columbia: University of Missouri press. ISBN 978-0-8262-1006-7.
