= Kihegashugah =

Osage chief (1791–1840)

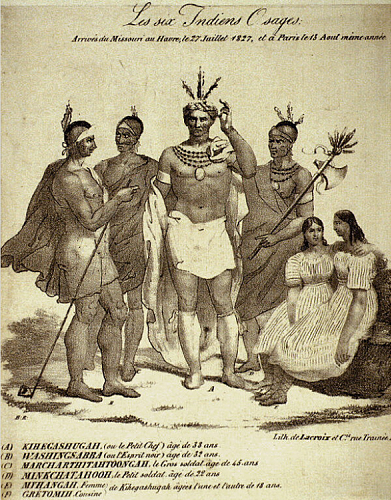
Kihegashugah (center) with other natives from his tribe (1827) Lithograph Artist: Pierre Lacroix, 1783–1856

Kihegashugah (c. 1791–c. 1840) or "Little Chief" ("kihega" means chief; "shugah" means little) was a leader of the Osage Nation in central Missouri. The term "little" in this context does not mean small in stature, but rather that he was a secondary, not a paramount, leader of the Osage. Tribal folklore said that he was the great-grandson of an Osage man who visited France in 1725. Kihegashugah was said to be one of the most distinguished of the Osage Indians. He was one of six members of his tribe to travel to France in the 1820s.

== Journey to France ==
Kihegashugah was in his late 30s when he made a long journey to France along with his two wives, Hawk Woman and Sacred Sun, Frenchman David DeLaunay, and four other Osage Indians in 1827. They faced many hardships on the way to France and when in France. The Osage were led to believe that they were traveling with DeLaunay to Washington, D.C. to meet the president. However, DeLaunay actually took them to France and the Netherlands where he displayed them in a Wild West show for European entertainment. While in France Little Chief and his band met King Charles. While there Little Chief took a ride in a hot air balloon. The hot air balloon was a recent invention of the French Montgofier brothers, and a popular attraction in France during the period.

== Return to America ==
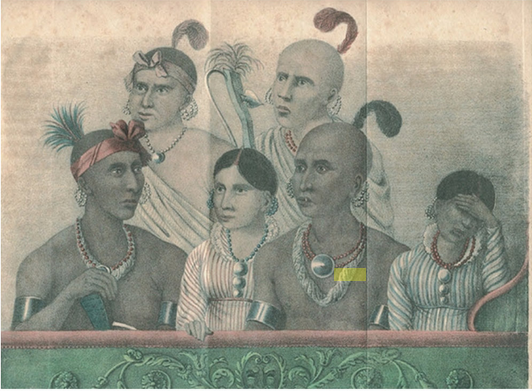
From Luther Brand's Illustration, 1827. Original Caption: "The Indians From the Tribe Osage, who are still in Paris—at the theater in Rouen" Kihegashugah can be seen in the front row with his two wives, Hawk Woman and Sacred Sun.

Early sources conflated Little Chief Kihegashugah with a fellow tribesman, Little Soldier, and reported that he died of smallpox while aboard a ship when returning to America after the voyage. In fact, Kihegashugah was on the Fort Gibson Indian Territory tribal councils of 1833 and 1839.
