= History of the Indian Tribes of North America =

Compilation by Thomas L. McKenney and James Hall

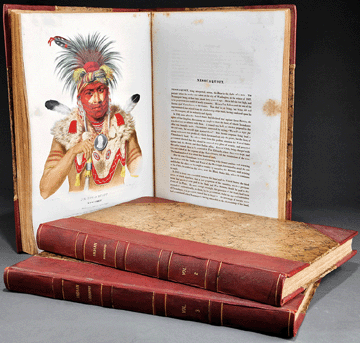
- Authors: Thomas L. McKenney; James Hall
- Illustrator: Three frontispieces after Peter Rindisbacher and Karl Bodmer, and 117 portrait plates after Henry Inman's copies of the original oil paintings, mostly by Charles Bird King, and drawn on stone by Albert Newsam, Alfred Hoffy, Ralph Tremblay, Henry Dacre, and others, printed and colored by J. T. Bowen and others
- Language: English
- Subject: United States History; Native Americans
- Published: First edition of v. 1 published by E.C. Biddle, Philadelphia, 1836.; Volumes 2-3 published by D. Rice and J.G. Clark, 1842-44.
- Publication date: 1836–1844; 1872
- Publication place: United States
- Media type: Hardcover
- OCLC: 3331971

The History of the Indian Tribes of North America is a three-volume collection of Native American biographies and accompanying lithograph portraits, originally published in the United States from 1836 to 1844 by Thomas McKenney and James Hall. The majority of the portraits were first painted in oil by Charles Bird King. McKenney was working as the US Superintendent of Indian Trade and would head the Office of Indian Affairs, both within the War Department. He planned publication of the biographical project to be supported by private subscription, as was typical for publishing of the time.

Believing that Native Americans were threatened as a race, McKenney wanted to preserve a record of their leaders for government archives, as well as to share it with the American people. He commissioned Charles Bird King to paint portraits of leaders who came to Washington to negotiate treaties, and James Hall to write biographies of them. The publication project incorporated lithographs made from the paintings.

== Background ==
From about 1821, Thomas McKenney, the U.S. Superintendent of Indian Trade within the War Department, started to commission portraits from Charles Bird King of American Indians who had traveled to Washington, D.C. as delegates to negotiate treaties with the federal government. McKenney continued this project as head of the Office of Indian Affairs, which was also within the War Department. King painted portraits of American Indians up to 1837. Additional painters commissioned to paint portraits included James Otto Lewis, Peter Rindisbacher, and Henry Inman.

McKenney said he wanted to preserve "in the archives of the Government whatever of the aboriginal man can be rescued from the destruction which awaits his race." He believed that American Indians were threatened as a people by the expansion of European-American society. Aware that there was ill feeling against them by those who wanted their land, he said the American Indians should be "looked upon as human beings, having bodies and souls like ours."

The growing collection of portraits was first housed in the United States Department of War, which then had responsibility for Indian Affairs. In 1858, the original oil paintings were moved to The Castle, the Smithsonian Institution's first building. It was also used as a repository and gallery for artworks.

== Publication ==
To reach a wider public, McKenney commissioned lithographs of the paintings, with each portrait to be supported by a full biography of the subject. The full project was envisioned to be published in three volumes. To research and write those, McKenney commissioned James Hall (1793–1868), a judge and Treasurer of the State of Illinois, who was known as a writer. Hall had difficulty in developing the biographies, as McKenney never provided promised source material. Hall spent eight years tracking and researching the subjects, about whom McKenney had provided little more than names.

The subscription price of $120 for the whole set had seemed high at the beginning of the project, but it was not enough to defray the costs incurred during the exacting production process of the original folio volumes. The Panic of 1837 caused widespread financial distress, and many subscribers to the Folio were unable to pay for their subscriptions. At that time, McKenney withdrew completely from the project.

Hall and a new publisher (D. Rice & A N Hart) brought the series to completion, with the final installment appearing in January 1844. This was long after McKenney had thought he could first publish the portrait/biography project. In the end, it had a total of 1,250 subscribers.

== 1865 fire at the Smithsonian ==
In the winter of 1865, workers relocating the portraits brought in a wood-burning stove to provide warmth, and vented the stovepipe into a ventilation shaft which they mistook for a flue. After two weeks, a full fire had ignited in the ventilation shaft. The second floor was engulfed, and the roof of the Castle subsequently collapsed.

It was the most catastrophic fire in the Smithsonian's history: 295 of the original Indian portraits were consumed; only five were rescued. Although one of the painters had made a few copies of his favorite portraits for himself, nearly all of the portraits would have been irretrievably lost had McKenney, Hall, and their colleagues not completed the lithography and publication project. The volumes remain a record of prominent Native American leaders of the first half of the 19th century.

== List of lithographs ==
The National Museum of the American Indian catalogs the lithographs with P (print) numbers P27694–P27813.

Captions are direct copies including preservation of the now-derogatory squaw to describe an Indigenous woman.

Lithographic plates in McKenney and Hall's History of the Indian Tribes of North America
Folio	Pl.	Code	Description
No. 1	1	P27694	War Dance of the Sauk and Foxes
No. 1	2	P27695	Red-Jacket, Seneca War Chief
No. 1	3	P27696	Kish-Kal-Wa, a Shawanoe Chief
No. 1	4	P27697	Mo-Hon-Go, an Osage Woman
No. 1	5	P27698	Shin-Ga-Ba-W'ossin, a Chippeway Chief
No. 1	6	P27699	Push-Ma-Ta-Ha, a Choctaw Warrior
No. 2	1	P27700	Tens-Kwau-Ta-Waw, the Prophet
No. 2	2	P27701	Esh-Ta-Hum-Leah, a Sioux Chief
No. 2	3	P27702	Waa-Pa-Shaw, a Sioux Chief
No. 2	4	P27703	Meta-Koosega, a Chippeway Warrior
No. 2	5	P27704	Wesh-Cubb, a Chippeway Chief
No. 2	6	P27705	Little Crow, a Sioux Chief
No. 3	1	P27706	Se-Quo-Yah
No. 3	2	P27707	Naw-Kaw or Wood
No. 3	3	P27708	Chon-Man-I-Case, an Otto half Chief
No. 3	4	P27709	Hayne Hudjihini, Eagle of Delight
No. 3	5	P27710	Qua-Ta-Wa-Pea or Col. Lewis. A Shawanee Chief
No. 3	6	P27711	Payta Kootha, a Shawanee Warrior
No. 4	1	P27712	Ki-On-Twog-Ky or Cornplanter
No. 4	2	P27713	Pah-She-Pah-How
No. 4	3	P27714	Caa-Tou-See, an Ojibway
No. 4	4	P27715	Chippeway Squaw and Child
No. 4	5	P27716	Pet-A-Le-Shar-Ro, a Pawnee Brave
No. 4	6	P27717	Chono Ca Pe, an Otto Chief
No. 5	1	P27718	Wa-Na-Ta, the Charger, Grand Chief of the Sioux
No. 5	2	P27719	Peah-Mas-Ka, a Musquawkee Chief
No. 5	3	P27720	Ca-Ta-He-Cas-Sa-Black Hoof, Principal Chief of the Shawanoes
No. 5	4	P27721	Chippeway Squaw and Child
No. 5	5	P27722	Okee-Maakee-Quid, a Chippeway Chief
No. 5	6	P27723	Wa-Em-Boesh-Kaa, a Chippeway Chief
No. 6	1	P27724	McIntosh, a Creek Chief
No. 6	2	P27725	Ong-Pa-Ton-Ga, or the Big Elk, Chief of the Omahas
No. 6	3	P27726	Ma-Has-Kah, or White Cloud, an Ioway Chief
No. 6	4	P27727	Rant-Che-Wai-Me, or Female Flying Pigeon
No. 6	5	P27728	Young Ma-Has-Kah, Chief of the Ioways
No. 6	6	P27729	Ne-Sou-A-Quoit, a Fox Chief
No. 7	1	P27730	Moa-Na-Hon-Ga, Great Walker, an Iowa Chief
No. 7	2	P27731	Shau-Hau-Napo-Tinia, an Ioway Chief
No. 7	3	P27732	Tah-Chee, a Cherokee Chief
No. 7	4	P27733	A-Na-Cam-E-Gish-Ca, a Chippeway Chief
No. 7	5	P27734	Wa-Bish-Kee-Pe-Nas, the White Pidgeon, a Chippewa
No. 7	6	P27735	Tshusick, an Ojibway Woman
No. 8	1	P27736	Major Ridge, a Cherokee Chief
No. 8	2	P27737	Lap-Pa-Win-Sue, a Delaware Chief
No. 8	3	P27738	Tish-Co-Han, a Delaware Chief
No. 8	4	P27739	Sha-Ha-Ka, a Mandan Chief
No. 8	5	P27740	To-Ka-Con, a Sioux Chief
No. 8	6	P27741	Mon-Ka-Ush-Ka, a Sioux Chief
No. 9	1	P27742	Hunting the Buffaloe
No. 9	2	P27743	Ho-Po-Eth-Le-Yo-Ho-Lo
No. 9	3	P27744	Yoholo-Micco, a Creek Chief
No. 9	4	P27745	Mistippee
No. 9	5	P27746	Paddy-Carr, Creek Interpreter
No. 9	6	P27747	Timpoochee Barnard, an Uchee Warrior
No. 10	1	P27748	Ma-Ka-Tai-Me-She-Kia-Kiah, or Black Hawk a Saukie Brave
No. 10	2	P27749	Kish-Ke-Kosh, a Fox Brave
No. 10	3	P27750	Wa-Pel-La, Chief of the Musquakees
No. 10	4	P27751	Ap-Pa-Noo-Se, Saukie Chief
No. 10	5	P27752	Tai-O-Mah, a Musquakee Brave
No. 10	6	P27753	Not-Chi-Me-Ne, an Ioway Chief
No. 11	1	P27754	Keokuk, Chief of the Sacs & Foxes
No. 11	2	P27755	Ne-O-Mon-Ne, an Ioway Chief
No. 11	3	P27756	Kee-Shes-Wa, a Fox Chief
No. 11	4	P27757	Tah-Ro-Hon, an Ioway Warrior
No. 11	5	P27758	Wat-Che-Mon-Ne, an Ioway Chief
No. 11	6	P27759	Tustennuggee Emathla or Jim Boy, a Creek Chief
No. 12	1	P27760	Me-Na-Wa, a Creek Warrior
No. 12	2	P27761	Wa-Baun-See, a Pottawatomie Chief
No. 12	3	P27762	Chittee Yoholo, a Seminole Chief
No. 12	4	P27763	Me-Te-A, a Pottawatomie Chief
No. 12	5	P27764	Thayendanehea, the Great Captain of the Six Nations
No. 12	6	P27765	Ahyouwaighs, Chief of the Six Nations
No. 13	1	P27766	Nea-Math-La, a Seminole Chief
No. 13	2	P27767	Mar-Ko-Me-Te, a Menomene Brave
No. 13	3	P27768	A-Mis-Quam, a Winnebago Brave
No. 13	4	P27769	Stum-Ma-Nu, a Flat-head Boy
No. 13	5	P27770	Le Soldat du Chene, an Osage Chief
No. 13	6	P27771	Pow-A-Sheek, a Fox Chief
No. 14	1	P27772	Shar-I-Tar-Ish, a Pawnee Chief
No. 14	2	P27773	Wa-Kawn-Ha-Ka, A Winnebago Chief
No. 14	3	P27774	Pes-Ke-Le-Cha-Co, a Pawnee Chief
No. 14	4	P27775	Hoo-Wan-Ne-Ka, a Winnebago Chief
No. 14	5	P27776	Wa-Kawn, a Winnebago Chief
No. 14	6	P27777	Ka-Ta-Wa-Be-Da, a Chippeway Chief
No. 15	1	P27778	Foke-Luste-Hajo, a Seminole
No. 15	2	P27779	John Ridge, a Cherokee
No. 15	3	P27780	A-Chippeway-Widow
No. 15	4	P277781	Micanopy, a Seminole Chief
No. 15	5	P277782	Se-Loc-Ta, a Creek Chief
No. 15	6	P27783	Kai-Pol-E-Quah, White Nosed Fox
No. 16	1	P27784	Aseola, a Seminole Leader
No. 16	2	P27785	Yaha-Hajo, a Seminole Chief
No. 16	3	P27786	Spring Frog, a Cherokee Chief
No. 16	4	P27787	Tshi-Zun-Hau-Kau, a Winnebago
No. 16	5	P27788	Wakechai, a Saukie Chief
No. 16	6	P27789	Ka-Na-Pi-Ma, an Ottawa Chief
No. 17	1	P27790	Encampment of Piekann Indians Near Fort McKenzie on the Muscleshell River
No. 17	2	P27791	Po-Ca-Han-Tas
No. 17	3	P27792	No-Way-Ke-Sug-Ga, Otoe
No. 17	4	P27793	No-Tin, a Chippewa Chief
No. 17	5	P27794	Mon-Chonsia, a Kansas Chief
No. 17	6	P27795	Tah-Col-O-Quoit
No. 18	1	P27796	Tuko-See-Mathla, a Seminole Chief
No. 18	2	P27797	Pa-She-Nine, a Chippewa Chief
No. 18	3	P27798	Oche-Finceco
No. 18	4	P27799	Ledagie, a Creek Chief
No. 18	5	P27800	On-Ge-Wae, a Chippewa Chief
No. 18	6	P27801	Nah-Et-Luc-Hopie
No. 19	1	P27802	Amiskquew, a Menominie Warrior
No. 19	2	P27803	Jtcho-Tustinnuggee
No. 19	3	P27804	David Vann, a Cherokee Chief
No. 19	4	P27805	Julcee-Mathla, a Seminole Chief
No. 19	5	P27806	Jack-O-Pa, a Chippewa Chief
No. 19	6	P27807	Kee-Sha-Waa, a Fox Warrior
No. 20	1	P27808	A Winnebago
No. 20	2	P27809	Waa-Top-E-Not
No. 20	3	P27810	Pee-Che-Kir, a Chippewa Chief
No. 20	4	P27811	O-Hya-Wa-Mince-Kee, a Chippewa Chief
No. 20	5	P27812	John Ross, a Cherokee Chief
No. 20	6	P27813	Apauly-Tustennuggee

== Gallery ==
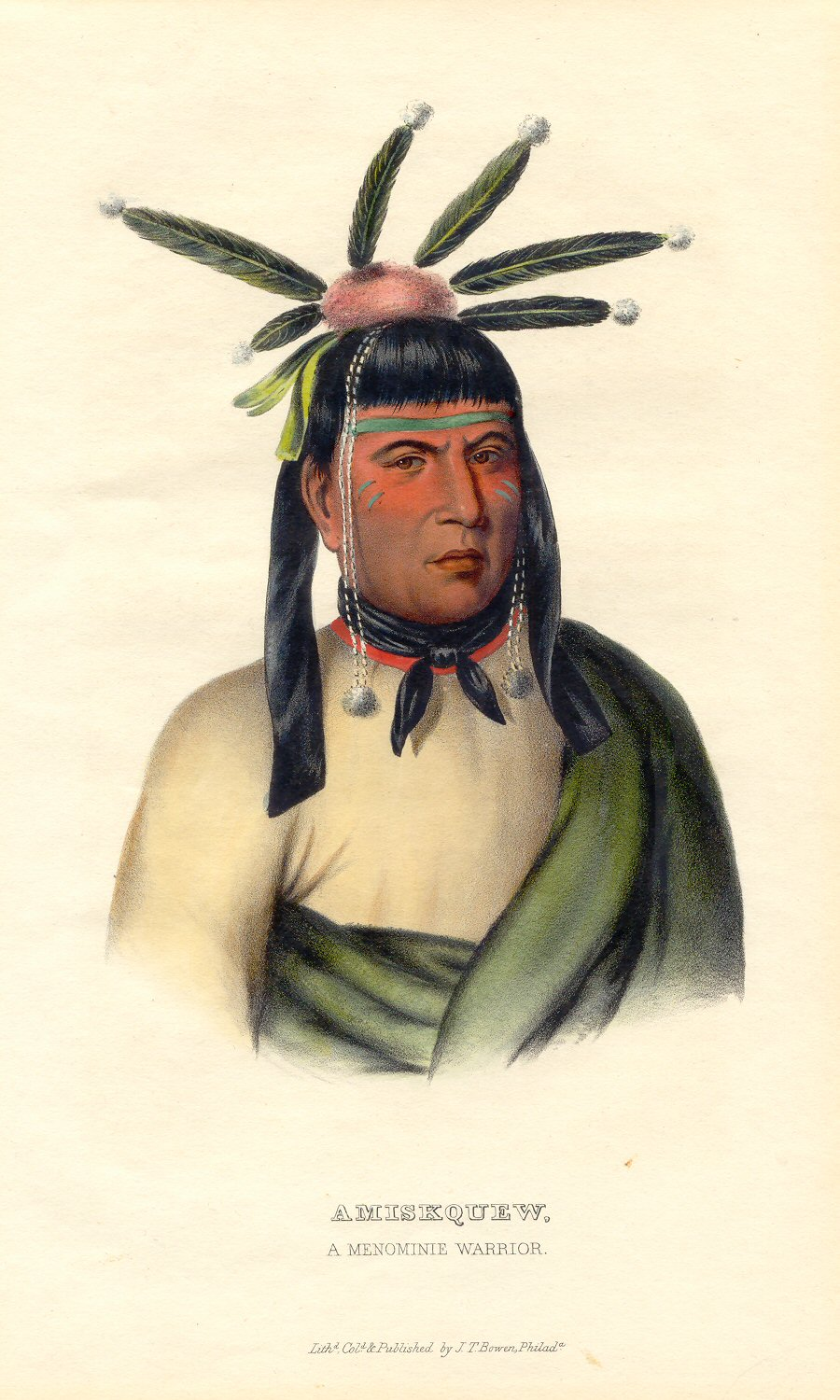
Amiskquew, A Menominee warrior

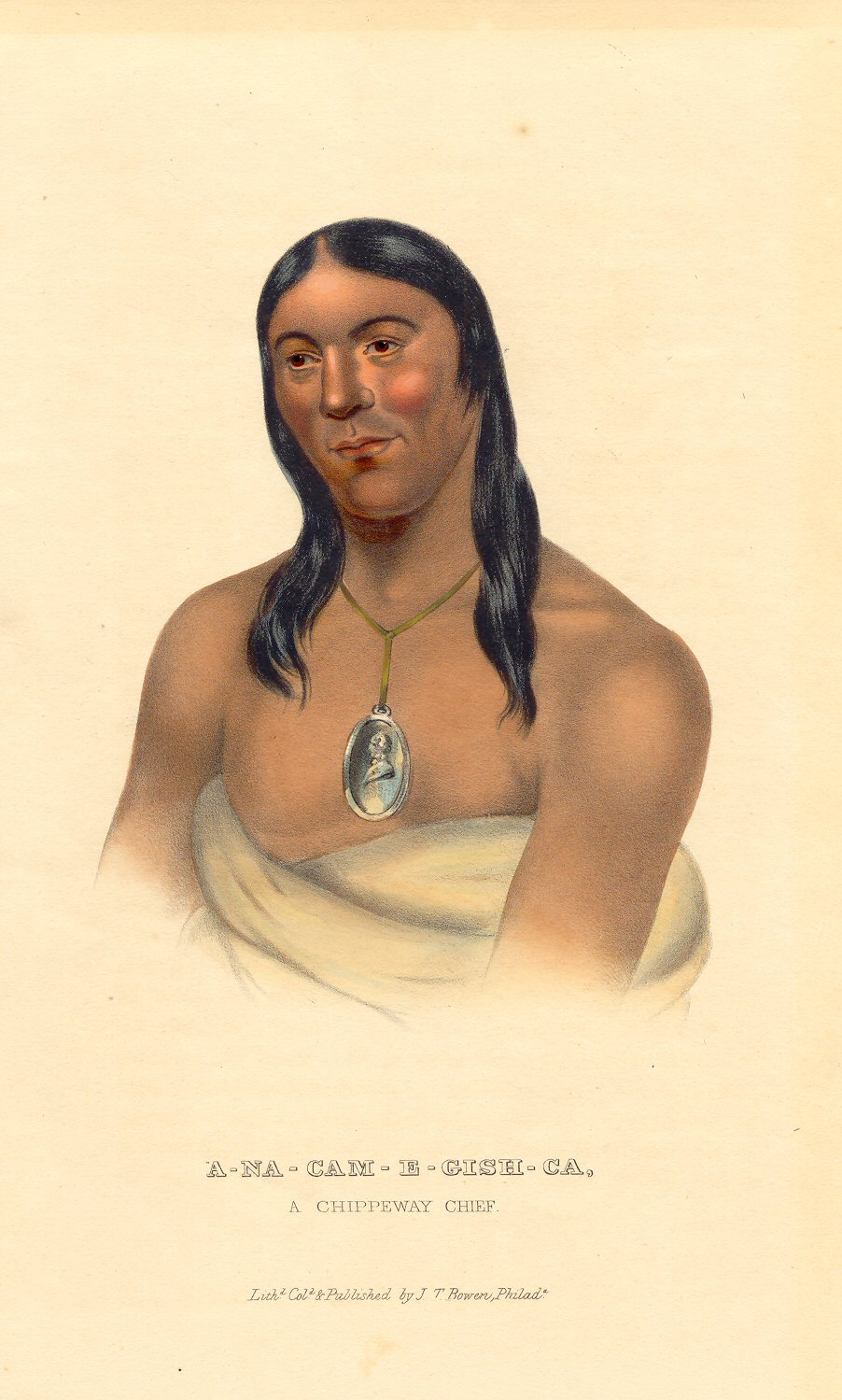
A-na-cam-e-gish-ca, A Chippeway (Ojibwe) chief

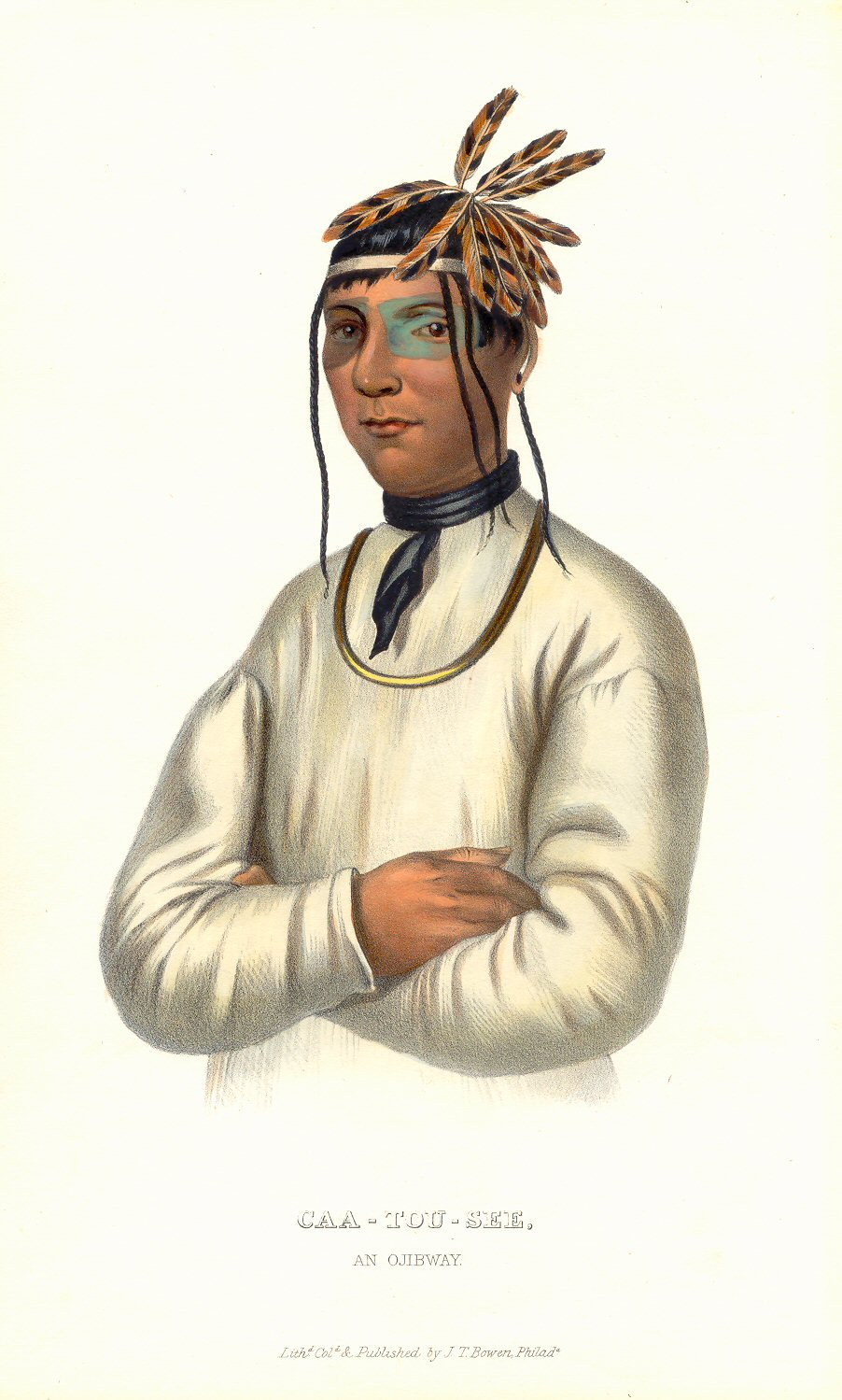
Caa-tou-see, An Ojibwe chief

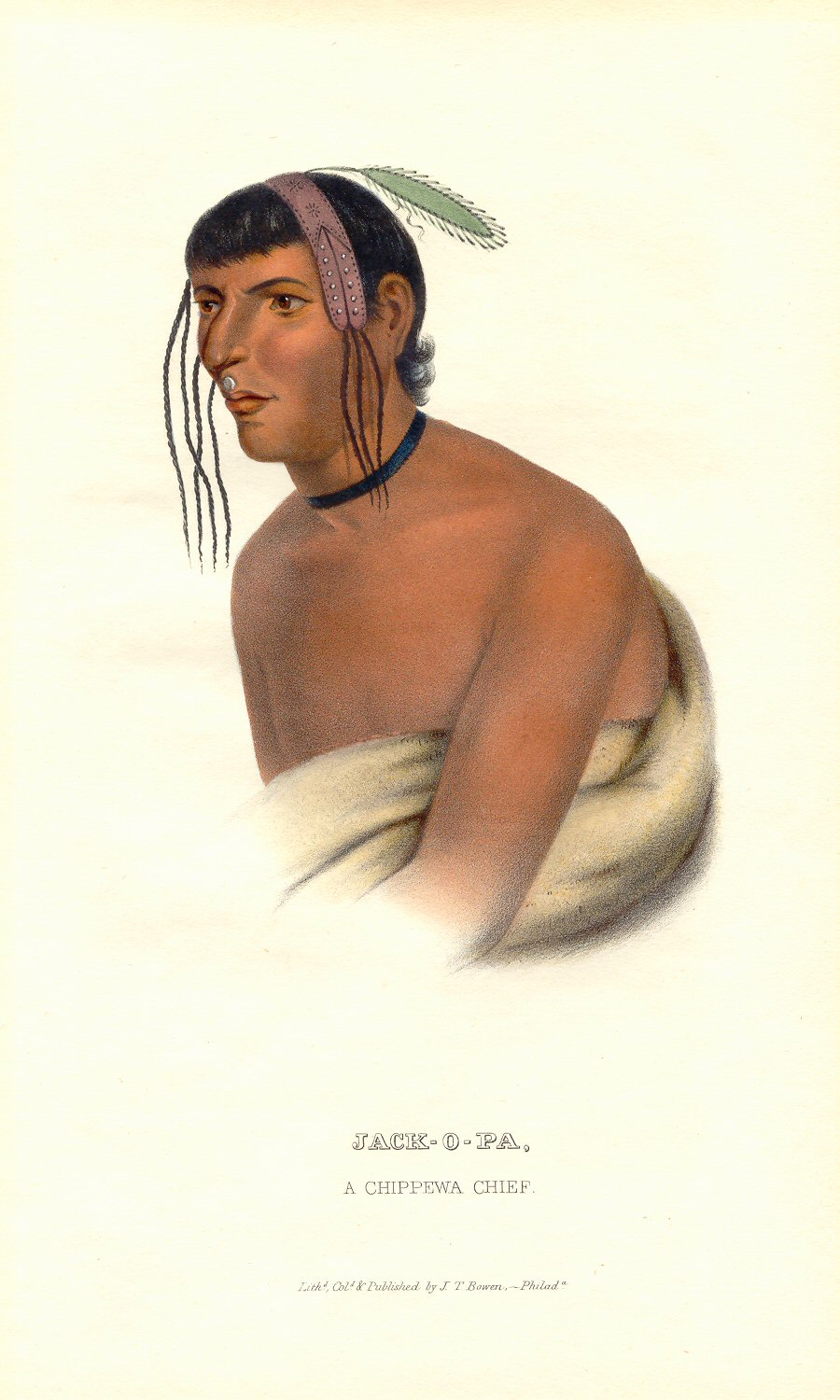
Jack-O-Pa, An Ojibwe chief

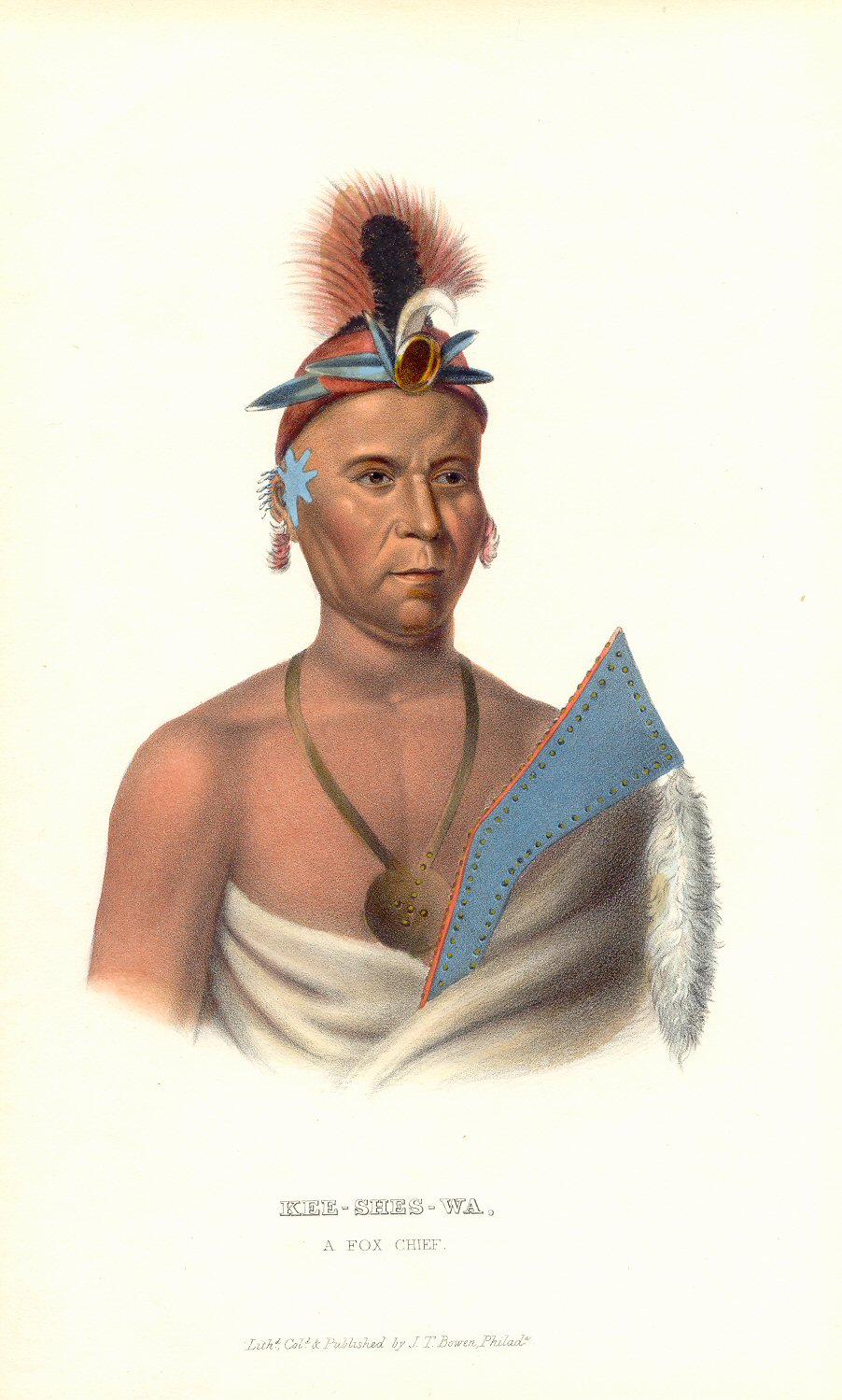
Kee-shes-wa, A Fox chief

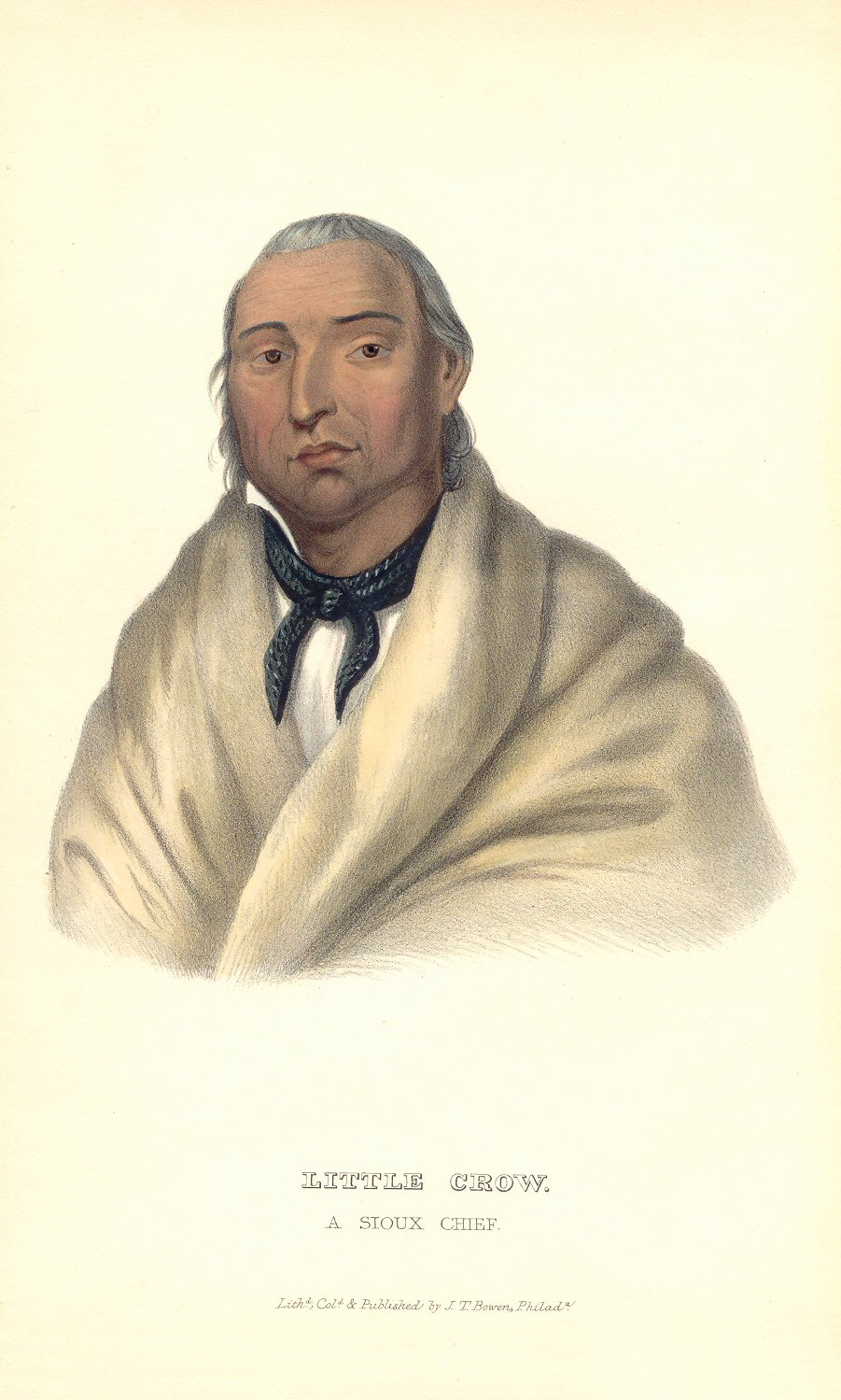
Little Crow, A Sioux chief

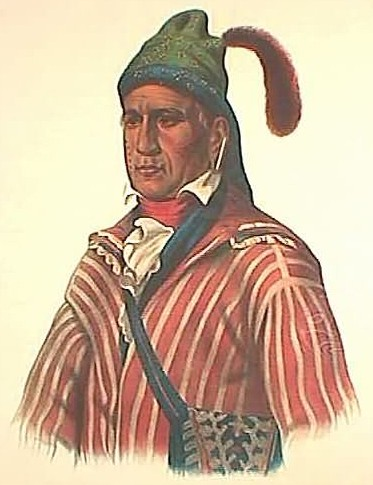
Menawa, A Muscogee (Creek) chief

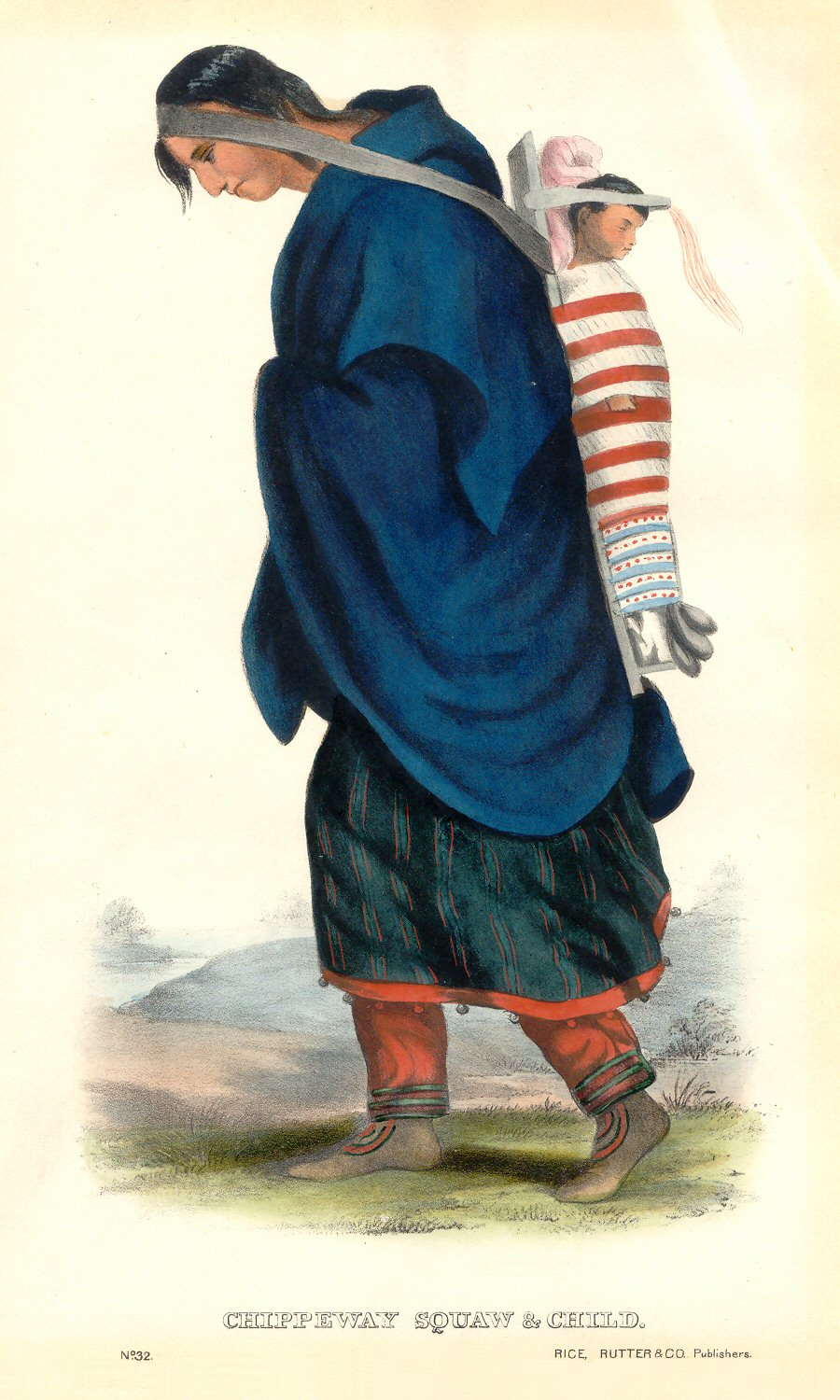
Ojibwe woman and child

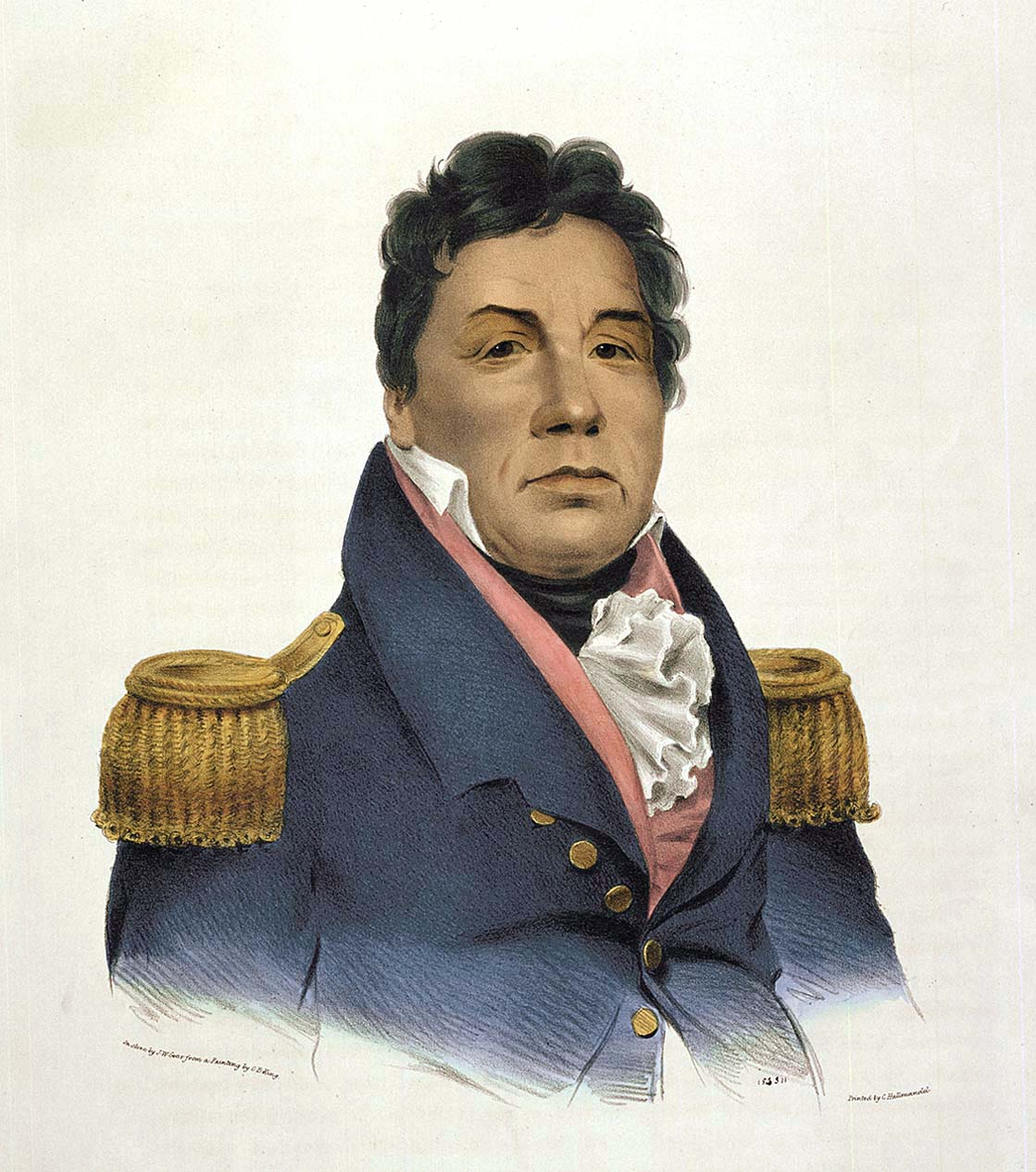
Choctaw chief Pushmataha, 1824

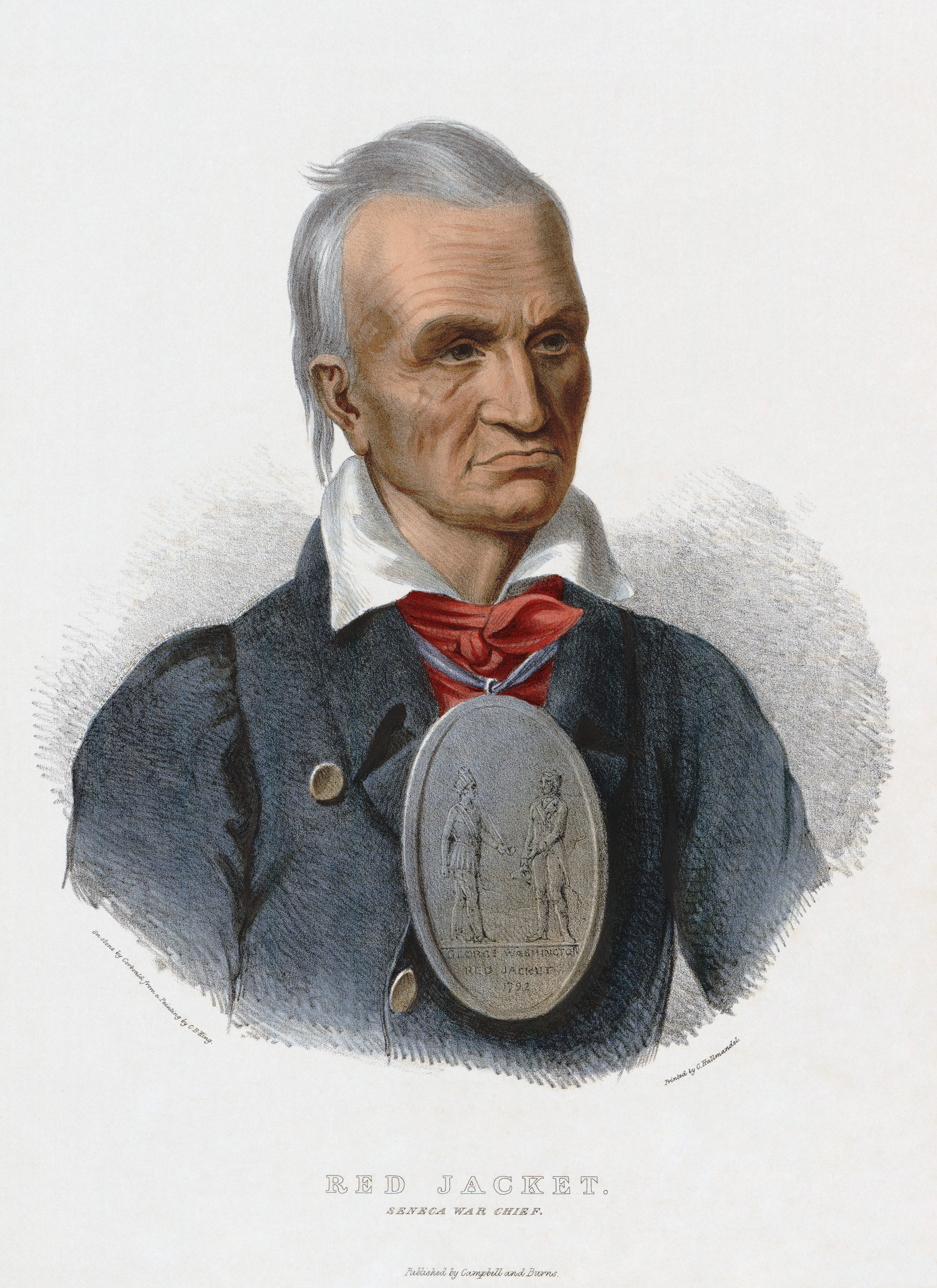
Red Jacket, Seneca orator and chief of the Wolf clan

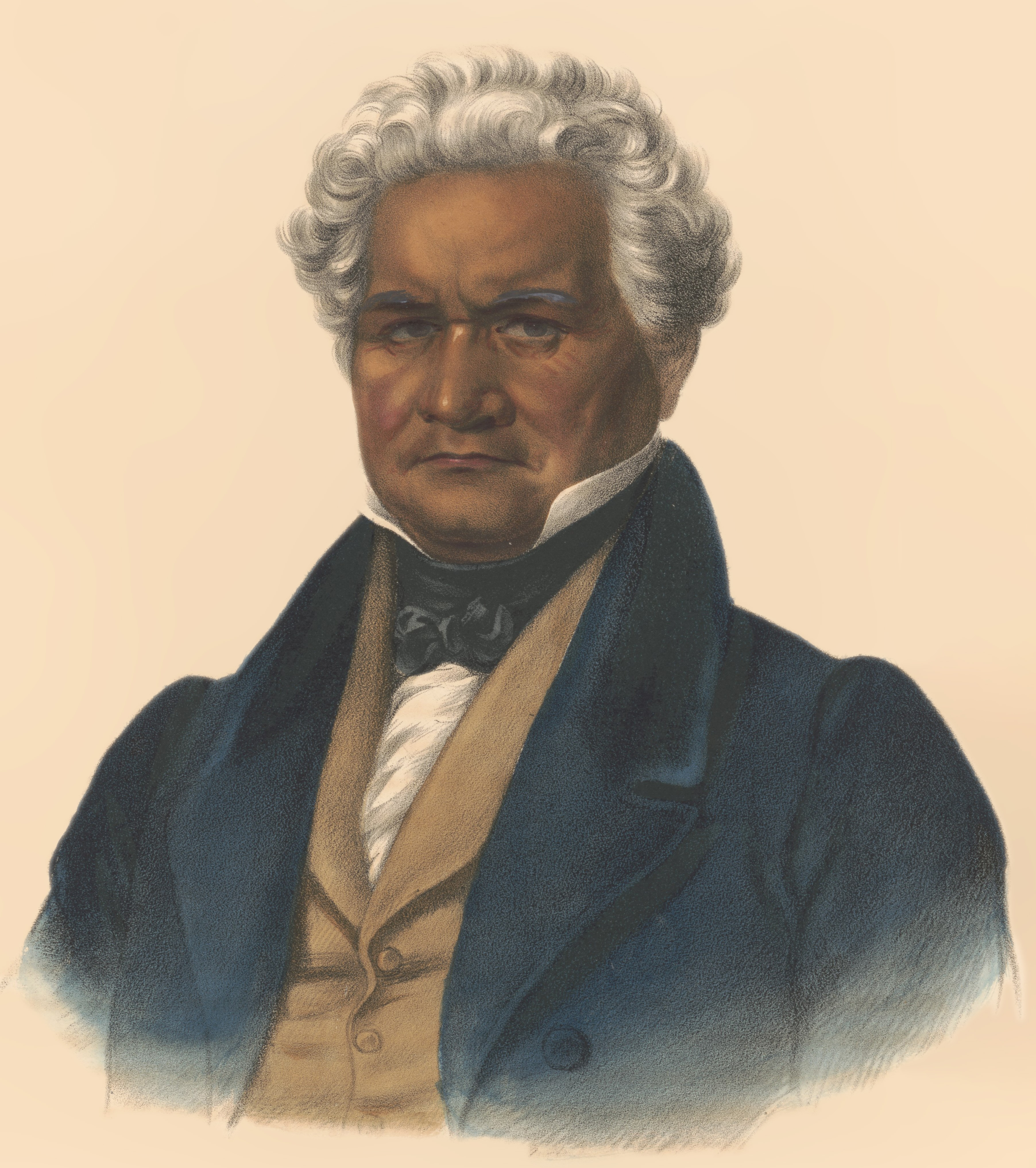
Cherokee Major Ridge, 1834

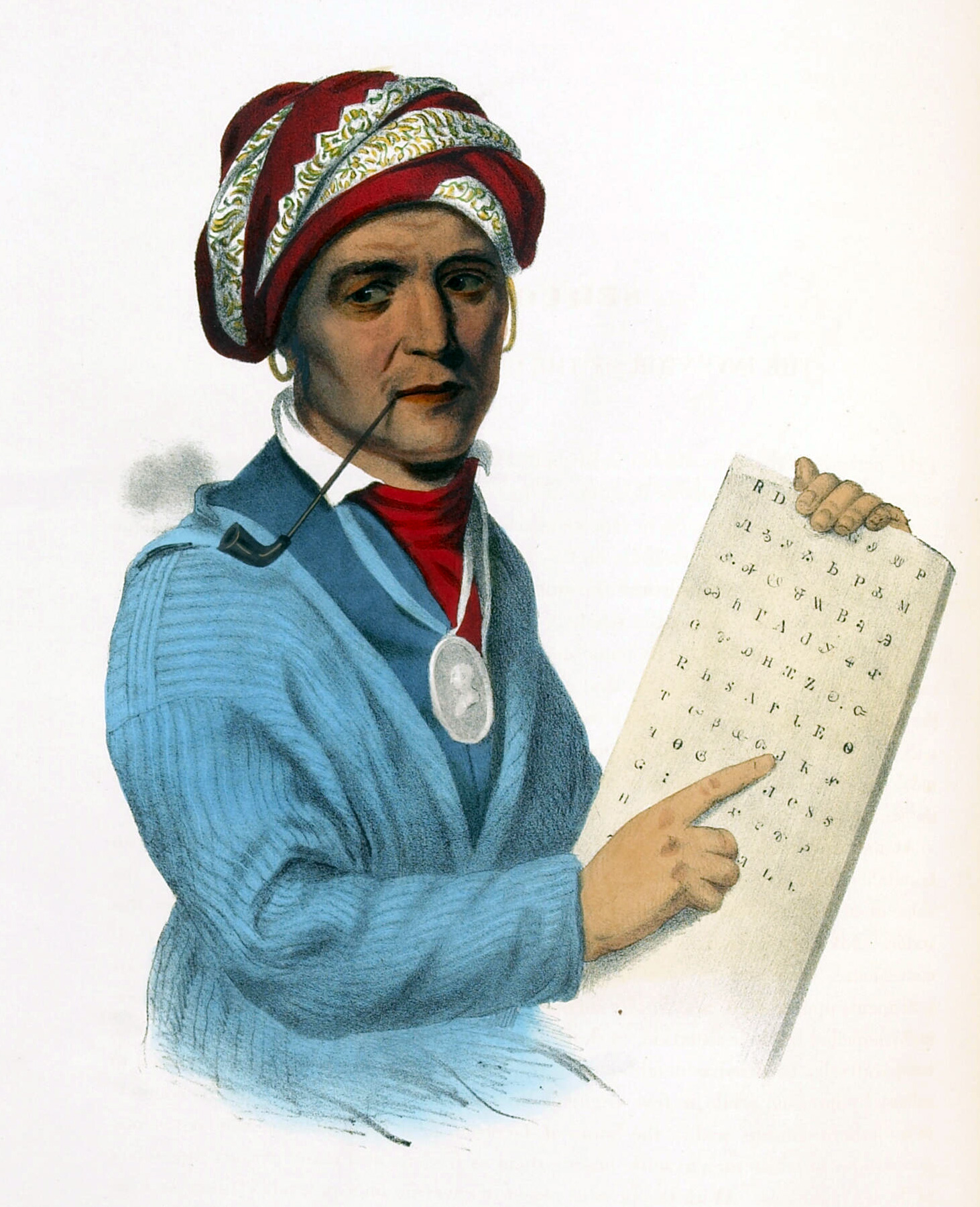
Sequoyah or George Guess, creator of the Cherokee syllabary

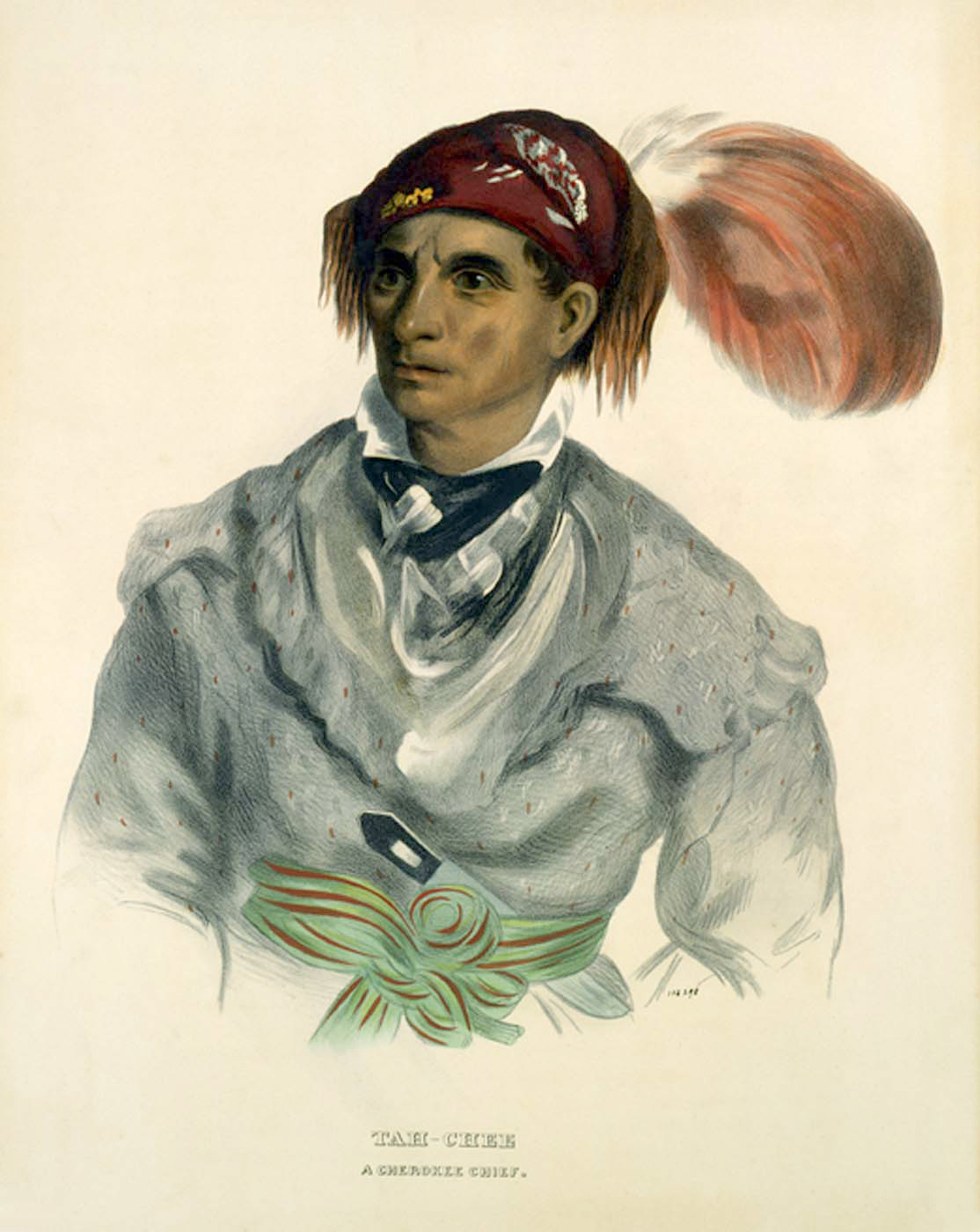
Tah-Chee (Dutch), A Cherokee chief

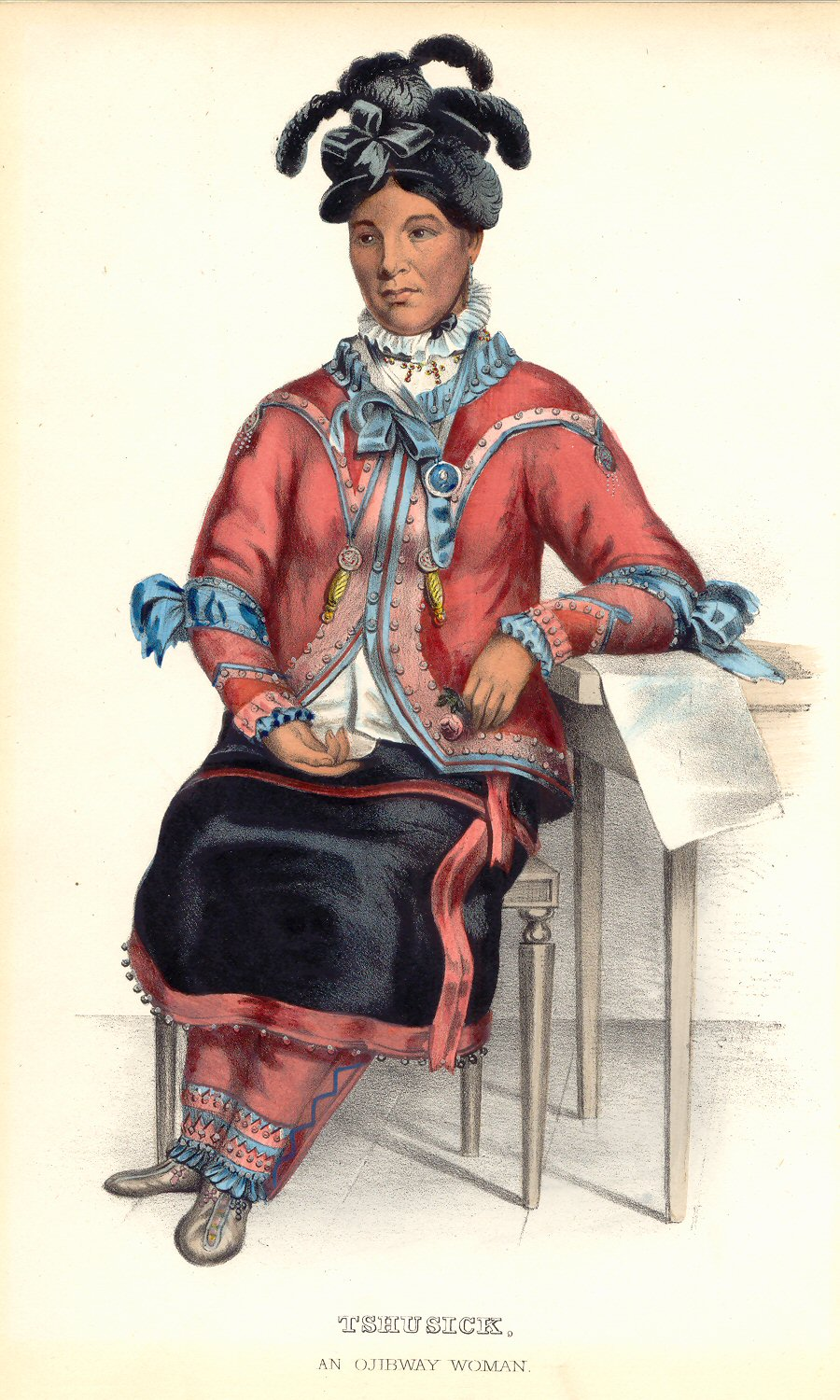
Tshusick, An Ojibwe woman

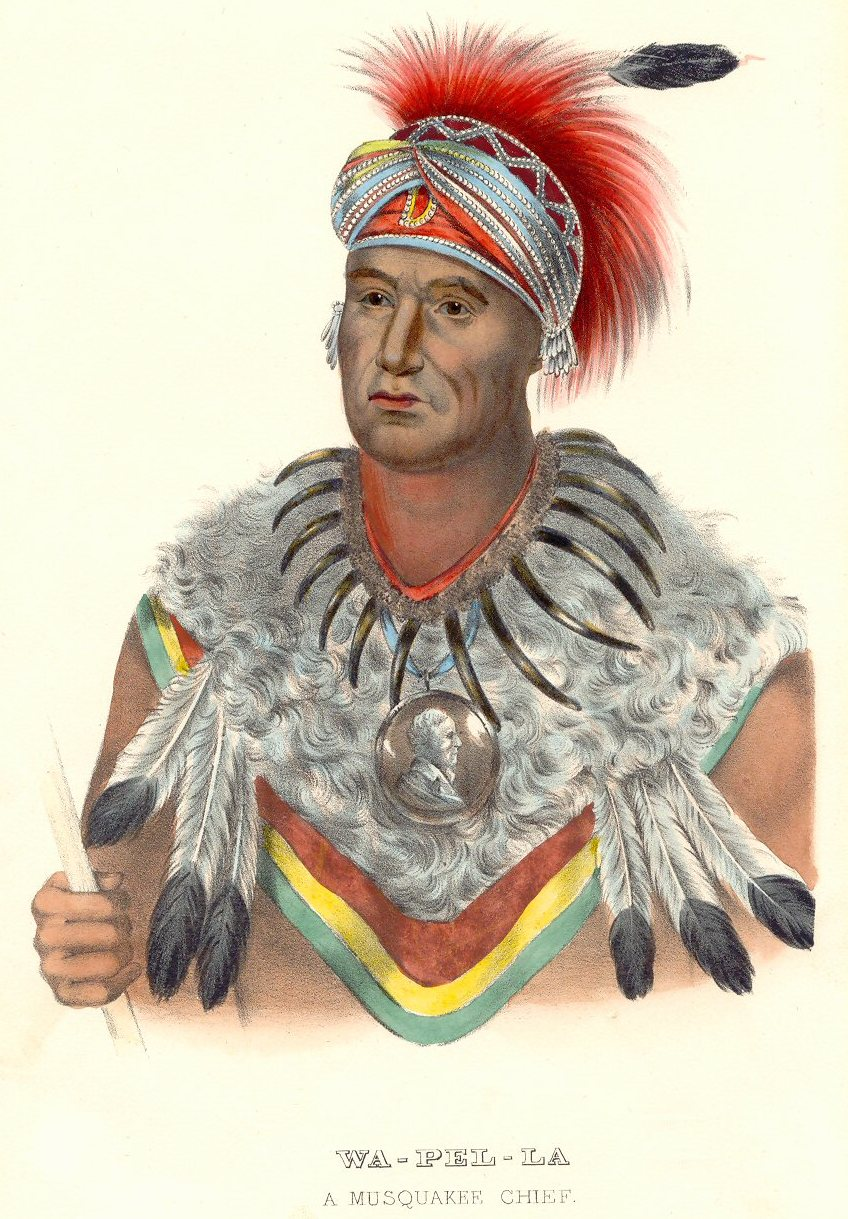
Chief Wapello; "Wa-pel-la the Prince, Musquakee Chief"
