= Shauhaunapotinia =

Ioway leader, fl. 1835

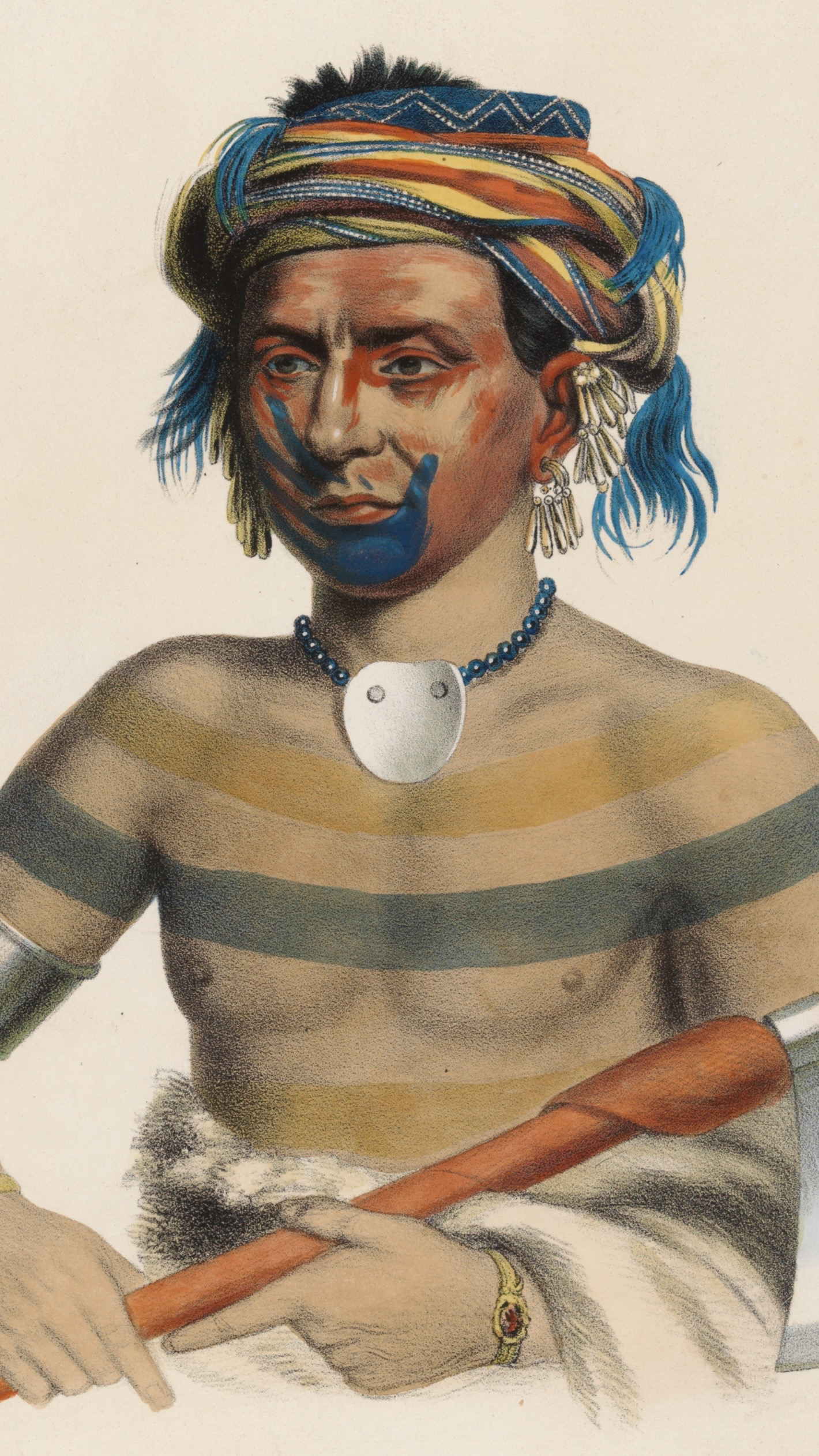
- Born: c. 1816
- Other names: "Shau-hau-napo-tinia, an Ioway chief"; Man Who Killed Three Sioux; Moanahonga, the Great Walker
- Citizenship: Iowa
- Occupations: chief, diplomat

Shauhaunapotinia (born c. 1816), Man Who Killed Three Sioux, also known as Moanahonga, the Great Walker, was a chief of the Ioway people from the vicinity of the Missouri River of North America. His portrait, painted in 1835, or 1837, appears as plate 2 in volume 7 (P27731) in McKenney and Hall's History of the Indian Tribes of North America. He is one of seven Ioway people pictured in the collection.

His "likeness was taken" when he traveled to Washington, D.C., in company with Mahaskah. The picture made was included in the exhibit Beauty and Wildness: American Western Art in Grand Junction, Colorado, in 1980.

His names come from his trek of 100 miles to avenge the death of his "boyhood chum," killed at age 19. He made his way to a Sioux village of 400 where he killed three people, bringing back their scalps back as trophies. For this, the "skins of the polecat, these being the insignia of bravery" were bound to his legs "below his knees."
