= Shakopee (Dakota leaders) =

Hereditary line of Mdewakanton Dakota chiefs

Shakopee or Chief Shakopee (Dakota language: Sakpedan, lit. 'Little Six') may refer to one of at least three Mdewakanton Dakota leaders who lived in the area that became Minnesota from the late 18th century through 1865:

- Shakopee I
- Shakopee II
- Shakopee III

The name comes from the Dakota Śakpe meaning "Six." According to tribal histories, the very first "Shakpe" was called that because he was the sixth child of a set of sextuplets.

Shakopee Lake near Mille Lacs Lake was named after one of the early Dakota chiefs named Shakpe. The city of Shakopee, Minnesota was named after Chief Shakopee II when it was first founded in 1851. The Little Six Casino operated by the Shakopee Mdewakanton Sioux Community in Shakopee, Minnesota is named after Chief Shakopee III.

Historian Doane Robinson mentioned an Ojibwe (Chippewa) attack "at the village of old Shakopee, the father of the Shakopee of 1812" which occurred in 1769, about one year after the Battle at Crow Wing.
