= David de Launay =

David de Launay was a French-born resident of St. Louis who led a group of Osage people to France in 1827.

== History ==
De Launay led a group of eleven Osage men and one Native American woman, Sacred Sun, to France in 1827. Whilst leaving St. Louis, their raft was wrecked, causing them to lose all their furs, and half of the Osage decided to return to their village. The others decided to go on, met up with de Launay, and traveled down the Mississippi River to New Orleans and then on to New England. De Launay and his crew then sailed for Le Havre, France arriving on July 27 1827. At first, they were greeted with great hospitality and met King Charles X. After a while the local people lost interest and it was hard for de Launay to afford the food and shelter needed by the Osage. He ended up selling tickets to see the Osage in their hotel rooms, and forcing them to perform a show. Finally, de Launay ran out of money, could not feed nor support the Osage, and was jailed for not paying his bills. This left the Osage to fend for themselves.
