= James Hall (writer) =

American politician and judge

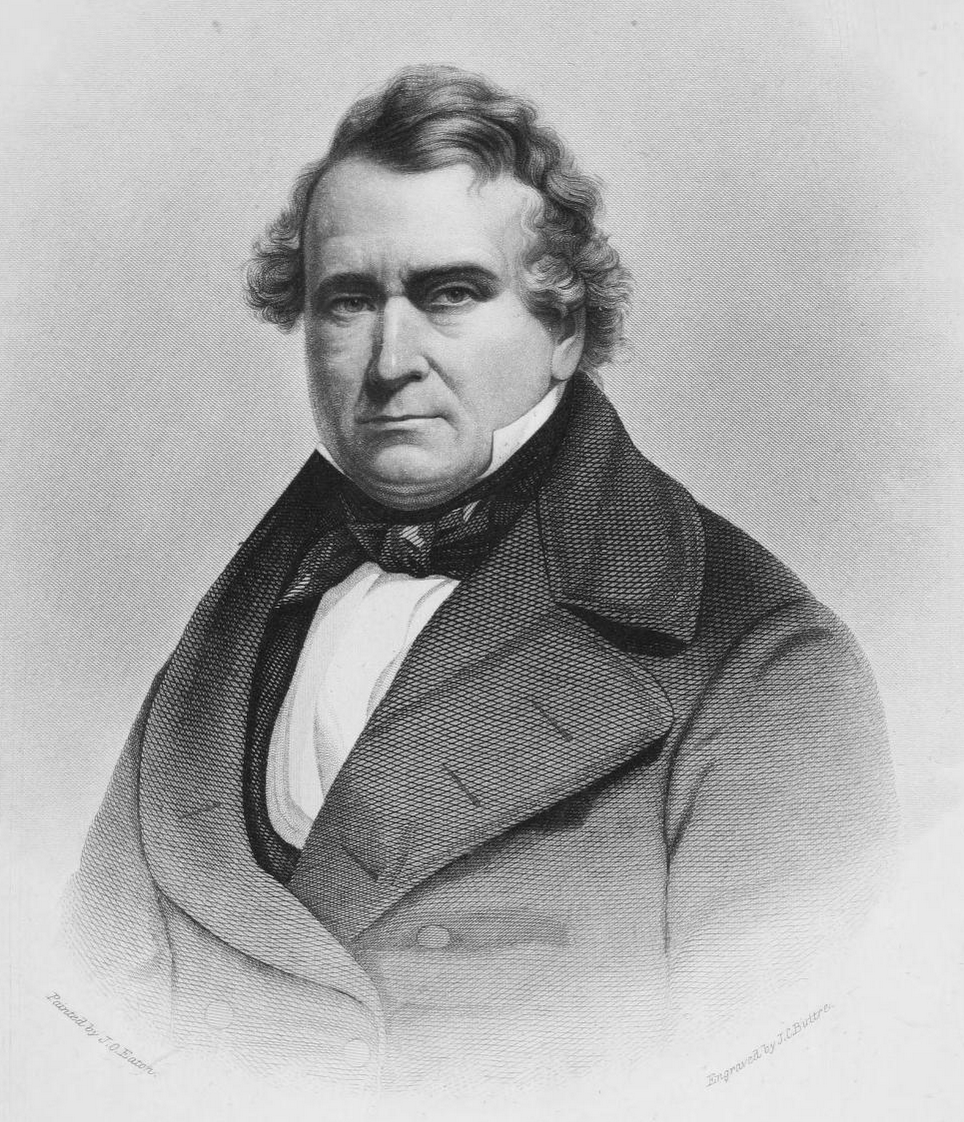

Treasurer of Illinois
- In office 1827–1831
- Governor: Ninian Edwards
- Preceded by: Abner Field
- Succeeded by: John Dement

Personal details
- Born: August 19, 1793 Philadelphia
- Died: July 5, 1868 (aged 74) Loveland, Ohio

James Hall (August 19, 1793 - July 5, 1868) was an American judge and man of letters. He has been called a literary pioneer of the Midwestern United States.

== Biography ==
Coat of Arms of James Hall

Hall was born at Philadelphia. After studying law for some time, in 1812 he joined the United States Army. In the war with Great Britain, he distinguished himself in engagements at Lundy's Lane and Fort Erie. At the end of the war, he accompanied an expedition against Algiers, but in 1818 he resigned his commission, and continued the study of law at Pittsburgh, Pennsylvania.

In 1820, Hall moved to Shawneetown, Illinois, where he commenced practice at the bar and also edited the Illinois Gazette. Soon after he was appointed public prosecutor of the circuit, and in 1824 state circuit judge. In 1827 he became state treasurer, and held that office till 1831, but he continued at the same time his legal practice and also edited the Illinois Intelligencer. Subsequently, he became editor of the Western Souvenir, an annual publication, and of the Illinois Monthly Magazine, afterwards the Western Monthly Magazine. As a fiction writer, his most famous story is “The Indian Hater” (1828). He died in Loveland, Ohio.

== Works ==
The following are his principal works:—

- Letters from the West, originally contributed to The Port Folio, and collected and published in London in 1828
- Legends of the West (1832)
- The Soldier’s Bride and other Tales (1832)
- The Harpe’s Head, a Legend of Kentucky (1833)
- Sketches of the West (2 vols., 1835)
- Tales of the Border (1835)
- Notes on the Western States (1838)
- History of the Indian Tribes of North America, in conjunction with Thomas L. McKenney (3 vols., 1838–1844)
- The Wilderness and the War-Path (1845)
- Romance of Western History (1857)
