= Thomas L. McKenney =

American government official (1785–1859)

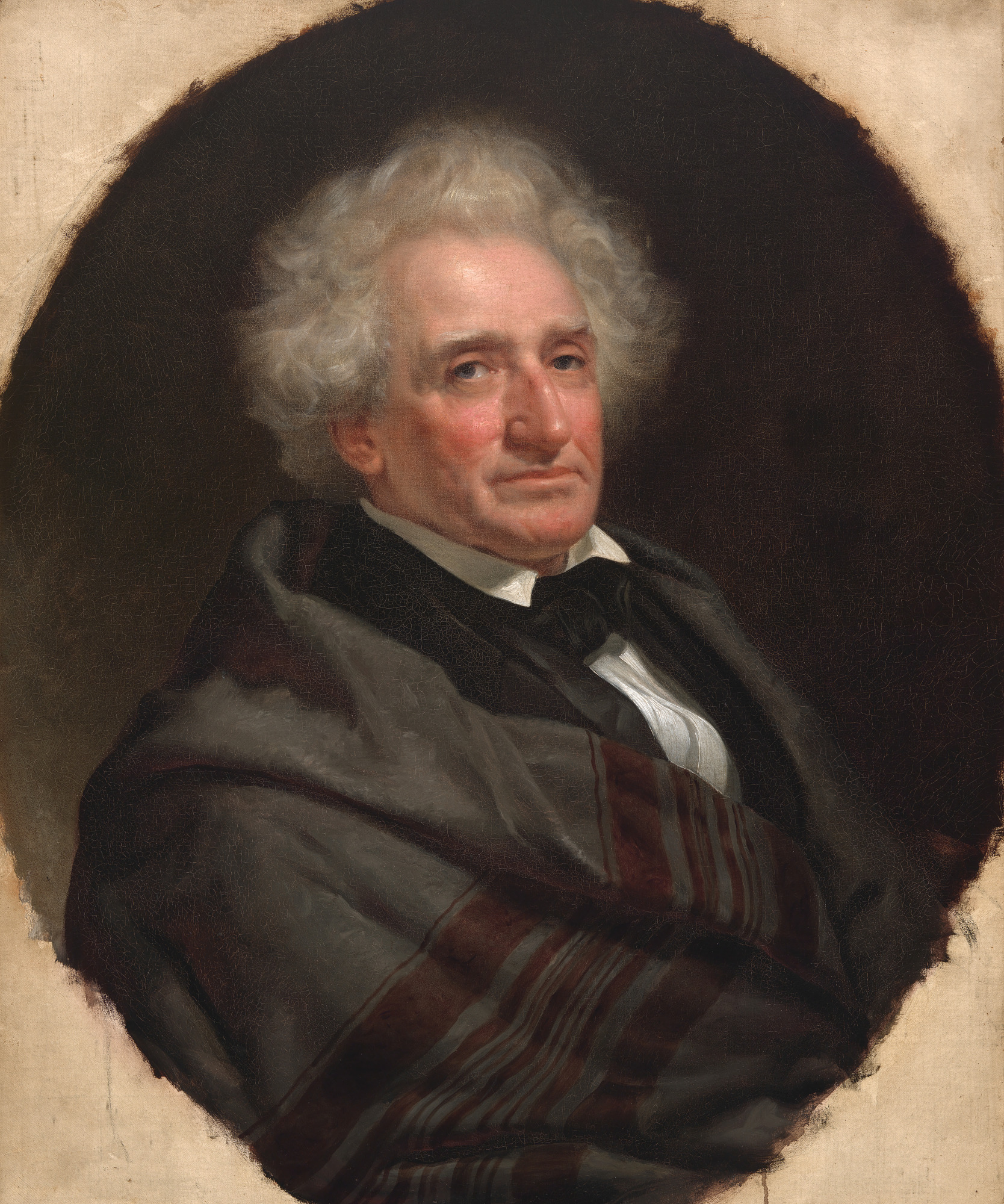
- Posthumous portrait by Charles Loring Elliott, c. 1856

Superintendent of Indian Affairs
- In office 1824–1830
- Preceded by: Office established
- Succeeded by: Samuel S. Hamilton

Superindendent of Indian Trade
- In office 1816–1821
- Preceded by: John Mason
- Succeeded by: Office abolished

Personal details
- Born: March 21, 1785 Hopewell, Maryland
- Died: February 19, 1859 (aged 73) New York City, New York, U.S.

Thomas Loraine McKenney (21 March 1785 – 19 February 1859) was a United States official who served as Superintendent of Indian Affairs from 1824 to 1830.

== Early life ==
McKenney was born on March 21, 1785, in Hopewell, Maryland. He was the oldest of five boys, and was raised and received his education at Chestertown, Maryland. McKenney was a Quaker, which influenced his approach to interactions with Native Americans.

== Superintendent of Indian Trade ==
McKenney served as superintendent of the U.S. Office of Indian Trade from 1816 to 1821. He oversaw trading houses that created goods that were traded for furs.

== Superintendent of Indian Affairs ==
After the abolition of the U.S. Indian Trade program in 1822, Secretary of War John C. Calhoun created a position within the War Department entitled Superintendent of Indian Affairs. This office later evolved into the Bureau of Indian Affairs. Calhoun appointed McKenney to the position, who served from 1824 to 1830. McKenney was an advocate of the American Indian “civilization” program, becoming an avid promoter of Indian removal west of the Mississippi River. After being elected to office, President Andrew Jackson, who favored Indian removal, dismissed McKenney from his position in 1830 when Jackson disagreed with his opinion that “the Indian was, in his intellectual and moral structure, our equal.”

While serving as Superintendent of Trade and Indian Affairs, McKenney helped gain passage of the Indian Civilization Act of 1819. Eleven years later, he helped draft and gain passage of the Indian Removal Act of 1830.

While serving as superintendent, McKenney denounced the United States Government for failing to keep white people out of territory belonging to the Cherokee as part of a treaty.

== History of the Indian Tribes of North America ==
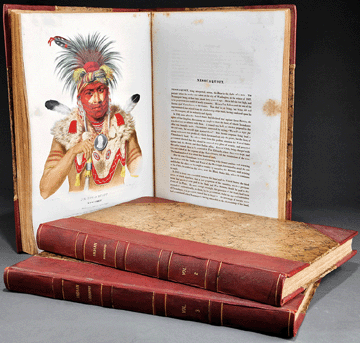
History of the Indian Tribes of North America

McKenney worked with James Hall to create and publish the three volumes of the History of the Indian Tribes of North America, which were released from the years of 1836 to 1844. The books included portraits of Native American leaders painted by Charles Bird King.

== Bibliography ==
- Nankano, Yumiko. "The Campaign for Civilization or Removal: Thomas L. McKenney and Federal Indian Affairs in the Formative Years" Bulletin of the Faculty of Humanities, Seikei University No.48 (2013) 85+ online
- Drinnon, Richard. “Facing West.” Google Books. Google. Accessed April 20, 2021. https://books.google.com/books?id=wrexPiqKo58C&q=Thomas%2BL.%2BMcKenney#v=snippet&q=Thomas%20L.%20McKenney&f=false.
- Fletcher, Carlton. “Home.” Glover Park History. Accessed April 20, 2021. https://gloverparkhistory.com/estates-and-farms/weston/thomas-l-mckenney-and-the-indians/.
- Viola, Herman J. “Diplomats in Buckskins.” Google Books. Google. Accessed April 20, 2021. https://books.google.com/books?id=FeGEhXY-4aEC&q=KENNY#v=onepage&q=mckenney&f=false.
- Viola, Herman J. “McKenney, Thomas Loraine (1785-1859), Government Official.” American National Biography. Oxford University Press. Accessed April 20, 2021. https://www.anb.org/view/10.1093/anb/9780198606697.001.0001/anb-9780198606697-e-0300320;jsessionid=7986B9412E2F498488536AE7EC415489.
- McKenney, Thomas L. Digital History. Accessed May 7, 2021. https://www.digitalhistory.uh.edu/disp_textbook.cfm?smtid=3&psid=679.

== See also ==
- U.S. Bureau of Indian Affairs
- History of the Indian Tribes of North America
