= Hayden Railroad Bridge =

Bridge over the McKenzie River in Oregon

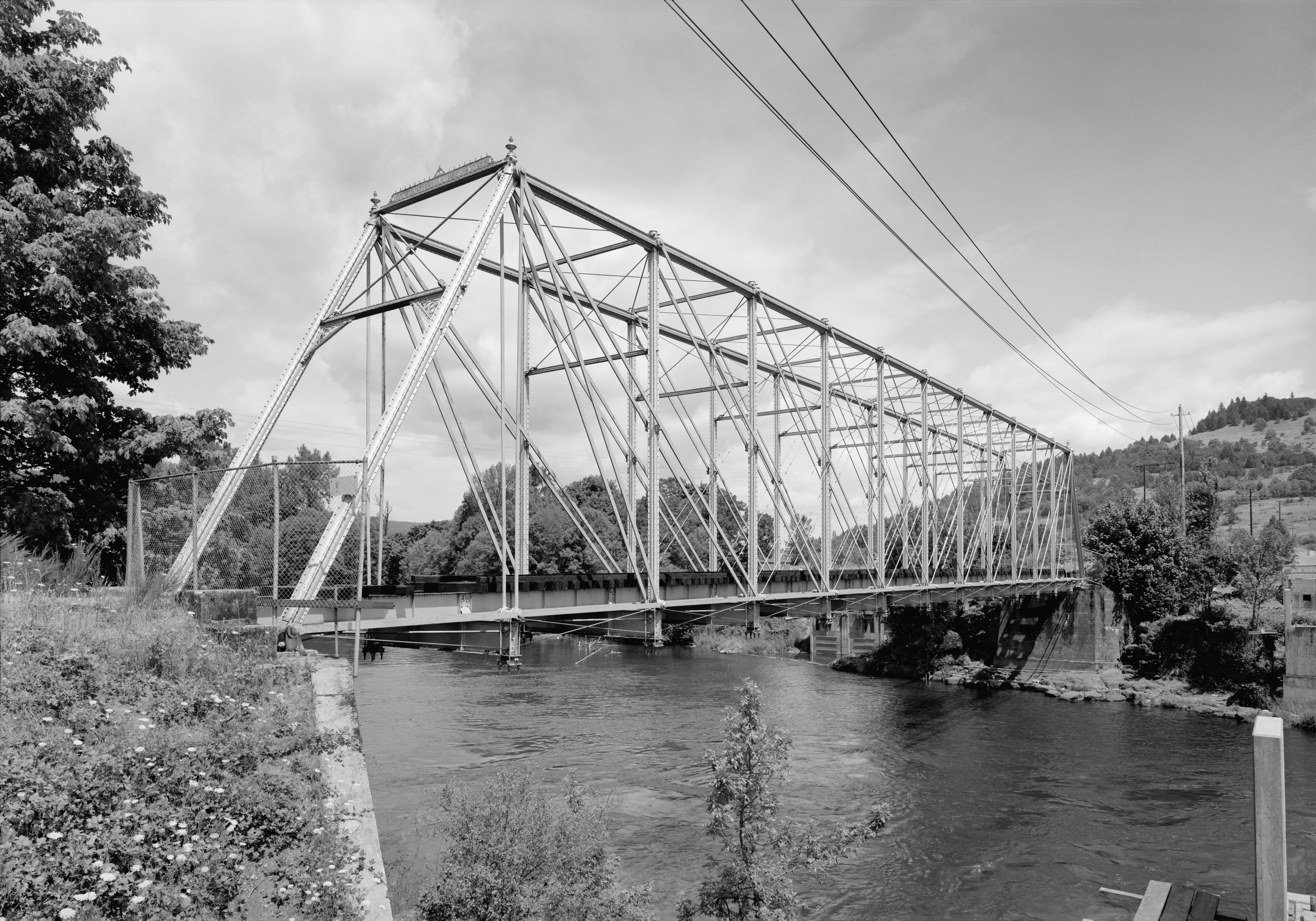
- Hayden Bridge from the southwest
- Coordinates: 44°04′19″N 122°57′51″W
- Carries: Pedestrians
- Crosses: McKenzie River
- Locale: Springfield, Oregon
- Official name: Booth-Kelly Railroad Bridge
- Other name: McKenzie River Railroad Bridge
- Owner: North Skunk River Greenbelt Association NSRGA / Workin' Bridges
- Website: www.workinbridges.org/heritage-bridge-parks/hayden-bridge/

Characteristics
- Design: Truss bridge
- Material: Wrought iron
- Total length: 224 ft (68 m)
- Width: 19.5 ft (5.9 m)
- Height: 35 ft (11 m)
- Load limit: 140,000 lb (64,000 kg)
- Clearance above: 14 ft (4.3 m)

History
- Fabrication by: Clarke, Reeves & Company, Phoenixville Bridge Works, Phoenixville, Pennsylvania

Location
- Interactive map of Hayden Railroad Bridge

The Hayden Railroad Bridge, (Note: The bridge became known as Hayden Railroad Bridge after an article in the Eugene Weekly referred to it as the railroad bridge at Hayden's Farm in 1901 and the Oregonian renamed it as Hayden Railroad Bridge named after a pioneer in the Willamette Valley.) is a truss bridge located in Springfield, Oregon, spanning over the McKenzie River. It initially served as a traditional railroad bridge, starting as part of the first transcontinental railroad in Utah, before moving to its current location as part of the Marcola line, whose primary use was the distribution of lumber. It later closed alongside the area's lumber mills and became a pedestrian bridge in 2019. It is one of the few remaining wrought-iron, Phoenixville bridges still standing, and the oldest intact bridge in the state of Oregon.

== Location ==
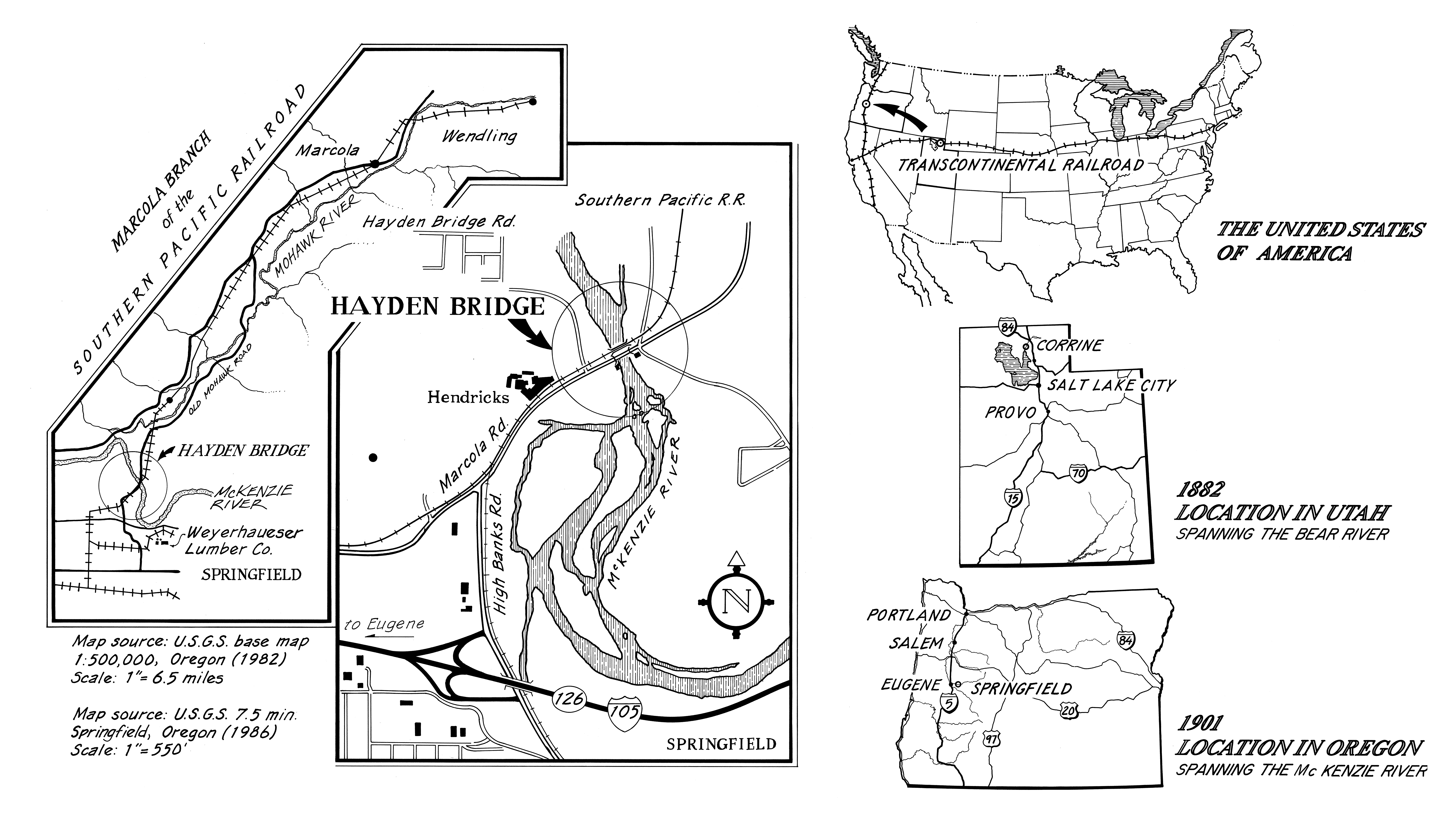
Map of Hayden Bridge and surrounding area.

Hayden Bridge is located in Springfield, Oregon, near the intersection of the Marcola, Old Mohawk and Camp Creek roads. Its milepost was 649.50 on the Southern Pacific Railroad when it comprised part of the railroad during its use as a railroad bridge. The bridge spans the McKenzie river, where it runs parallel to a road bridge comprising part of Marcola road, which is also named Hayden Bridge. Nearby the bridge are the Eugene Water & Electric Board's (EWEB) water collection facilities.

== Craftsmanship and design ==
Diagram showing the assemblage of the phoenix columns.

It has been our endeavor to give the greatest possible simplicity to details, and so to dispose the material in them as to transfer stress in the most direct and simple manner, and by such a method give to each main member precisely and only that kind of stress which it is intended to take.

— Phoenix Bridge Company, Album of Designs of the Phoenix Bridge Company, p. 4

Hayden Bridge is a fabricated truss bridge constructed of wrought iron. Today, fewer than 75 of such bridges exist. The bridge is also a Phoenix bridge, being a creation of Phoenix Bridge Works, and as such also incorporates Phoenix columns, a rare design where the bridge is composed of hollow wrought iron columns. Such a design was an innovation in wrought iron bridge technology, created before steel bridges came to effectively replace wrought iron bridges. The bridge is one of only two Phoenixville bridges still in existence in the Pacific Northwest. (Note: This is down from being one in three by as early as 1983, according to the American Institute of Architects.)

In terms of its truss, the bridge employs a through-truss design; more specifically, it uses a double-intersection Pratt truss, or a Whipple-Murphy truss, also a rare design. The truss is pin-connected, with the columns riveted together at their phalanges to form hollow beams. Because of the multiple web systems employed by this design, this causes the structure to be statically indeterminate. It is also the first bridge design to be calculated to support its intended load using scientific processes.

The bridge also incorporates cast-iron connections and decorative pieces, including ornamental medallions and railroad brake-wheel designs. The brake-wheel designs are located on the corner portal brackets, whilst the medallions are located at the crossings of the diagonal portal bracings. These elements, along with the nameplates, compose the only cast-iron parts of the bridge.

The bridge currently sits atop granite slabs, which are in turn set in concrete abutments.

== History ==
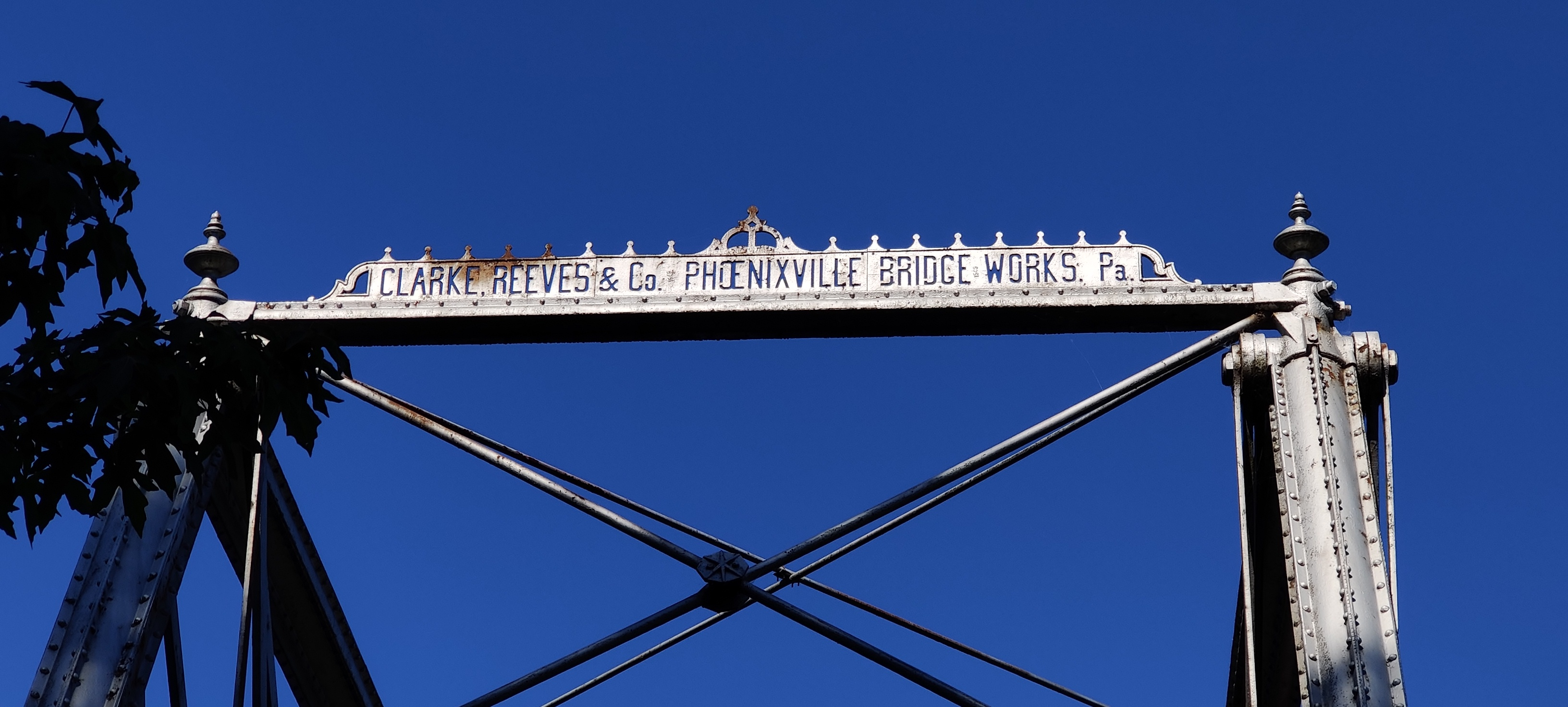
The names of the fabricators of the bridge inscribed onto the top of one of its entryways.

In 1882, the bridge was fabricated by Clarke, Reeves & Company, Phoenixville Bridge Works in Phoenixville, Pennsylvania. It was then bought and constructed by Central Pacific Railroad with the intent for it to span over the Bear River near Corinne, Utah, where it was erected as a trestle bridge in 1882, replacing an older wooden bridge as part of the first transcontinental railroad.

During the turn of the century, the bridge was bought and shipped over 1,000 miles away to be re-erected in its current location over the McKenzie River in Springfield, Oregon by Southern Pacific Railroad. It was moved to Springfield and reassembled in its current location along the Southern Pacific Railroad line in 1901. (Note: Eric DeLony writes that this occurred in 1911, whilst KVAL, KMTR, KEZI, the Register-Guard and the HAER state that the bridge was completed across the McKenzie river in 1901. This could possibly be due to a typographical error. Velasco, Velasco, Dennis, and Card write that the bridge was erected around 1899.) The bridge was then leased to the Oregon and California Railroad as part of its branch line (which became known as the Marcola Branch), and used as part of a logging railroad from then until 1979. Traffic increased in 1912 due to the prohibition of log driving down the McKenzie River, which forced all traffic to go through the railroad.

During the bridge's time as a route for logging and railroad tie shipments, the operations of the rail line supported by the bridge slowed down as the operations of its client mills ceased. This was caused by the shutting down of the Booth-Kelly Lumber Company mill at Wendling, Oregon in 1946, which was the only location that the line served until that point, (Note: This is also why Hayden Bridge became known as the Booth-Kelly Bridge.) which led traffic across the bridge to dwindle. This can mostly be attributed to the practice of cutting down trees too quickly, more than they were replaced via replanting.

In 1960, Weyerhaeuser bought the Marcola Branch, extending it to reach its Calapooya Tree Farm, allowing for it to make shipments between there and Springfield mill by 1962. In 1967 the company feared the bridge could completely collapse due to failures in its truss and its below-standard vertical clearance and load limit. As trucks became cheaper to ship lumber than by rail and as the timber surrounding the Marcola line vanished, the use of the bridge ground to a halt as the last train traveled over it on September 3, 1987. The bridge was abandoned on September 3, 1987, when the rail line that it supported closed down, and retired from service in 1989.

=== Ownership ===
The bridge was owned by Central and then Southern Pacific Railroad from 1882 until 1960, (Note: Oregon Department of Transportation Historic Resources Program Coordinator Chris Bell claims that the bridge was purchased by the Booth Kelly Lumber Company in 1901, according to the Statesman Journal.) when it was bought by Weyerhaeuser. Weyerhaeuser owned the bridge, until they sold it to Workin' Bridges, an Iowa-based non-profit organization under the North Skunk River Greenbelt Association, for $1 in June 2016. The reason for the transaction was that Weyerhaeuser wanted to avoid liability for the increasing number of bridge jumpers frequenting the location. Weyerhaeuser considered moving the bridge to another location at a cost of over a million dollars, but when that proved infeasible they considered its outright demolition. A 2014 press statement that they planned to destroy the bridge caught the attention of Julie Bowers, a member of Workin' Bridges and executive director of the North Skunk River Greenbelt Association, who contacted the company and arranged the sale.

== Renovation and preservation ==
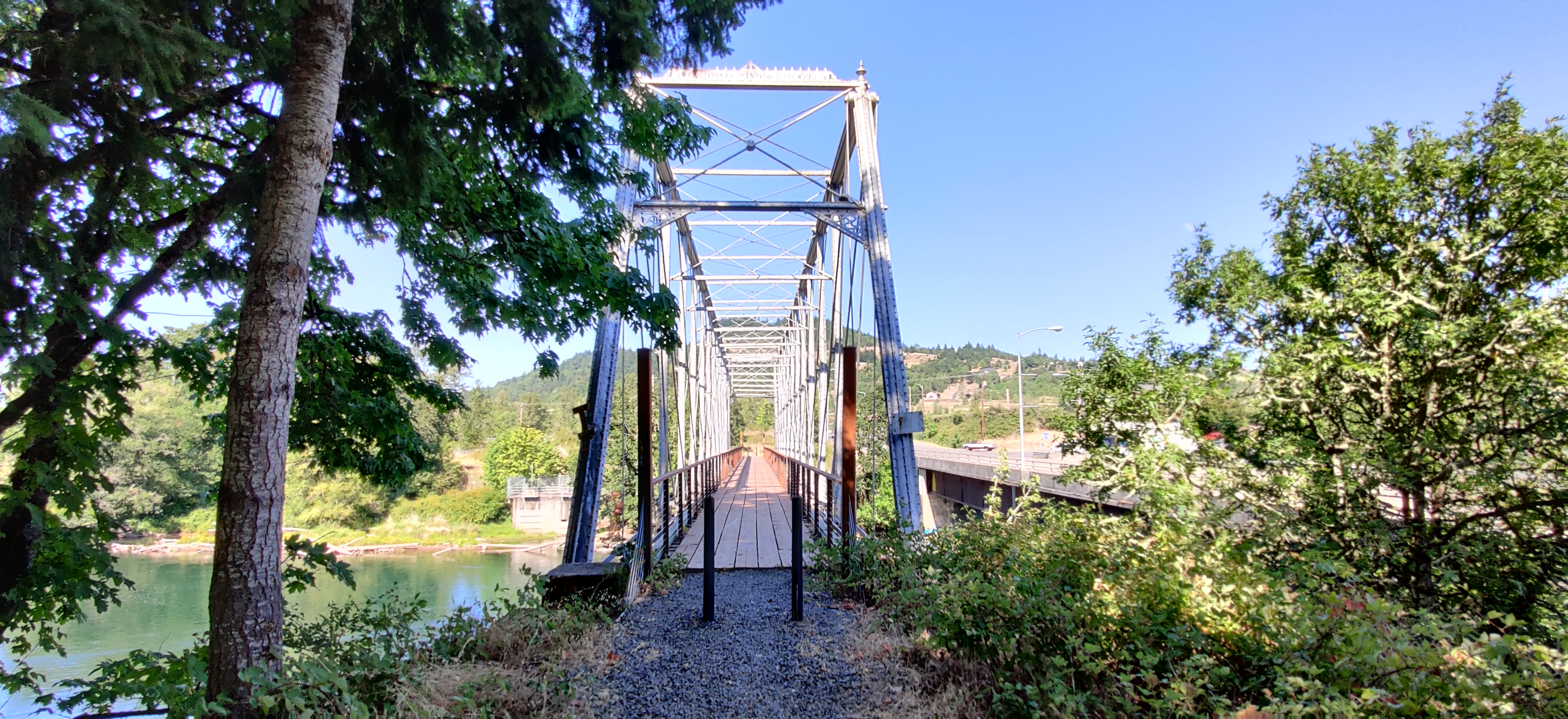
The Hayden Bridge walkway in 2021 with its renovations, outfitted for use by pedestrians.

Hayden bridge remains as one of the best-preserved iron bridges in the United States, and is the oldest standing bridge in Oregon.

The bridge was nominated for inclusion in the National Register of Historic Placesin 1981. The owner (Weyerhaeuser) successfully objected the following year, though it remains eligible. The bridge was also the subject of a Historic American Engineering Record survey in 1990. The survey was conducted at the request of the Oregon Department of Transportation due to the bridge's historic importance.

After selling the bridge to Workin' Bridges, Weyerhaeuser donated an additional $25,000 to the group to help turn the area into a park. After that, the organization worked with both Lane County and the city of Springfield to seek approval for improvements to the bridge, due to Springfield's urban growth boundary falling in the center of the McKenzie River. By 2018, wood floors were installed in order to turn the track into a rail trail, with future plans to install side railing and security gates. (Note: Bowers is also noted as having personally stated that she would have liked to additionally install a replica rail car next to the bridge.) With an anonymous donation of $100,000, the organization installed railings on the bridge and pedestrianized it in 2019. Over 40 people attended the opening ceremony. Bowers, the North Skunk River Greenbelt Association executive director, then stepped down and left it up to the surrounding community to raise an additional $100,000 to fully convert the area into a park.

=== Search for new owners ===
Since its closure the bridge has been a popular place for swimmers to dive into the water of the underlying river. This has caused liability problems for Workin' Bridges, which is unable to afford the cost of someone becoming seriously injured while jumping from the bridge. Because of this, the organization tried to donate the bridge to someone who will take it. This has included asking Lane County and the city of Springfield to turn it and 3.73 acres of the surrounding area into a park. The county refused the offer, as it did not have the resources to add another park. The bridge is also in the middle of multiple right-of-ways, which include those of Lane County, the city of Springfield and EWEB. This, liability issues and other factors increase the difficulty of finding new owners.

== See also ==
- List of bridges documented by the Historic American Engineering Record in Oregon
- Nels Roney – engineer who erected the bridges of Lane County. He also repaired Hayden Bridge's approach when it was damaged in 1907.
- Capon Lake Whipple Truss Bridge – another example of a Whipple-Murphy truss bridge
