= De Launay =

de Launay coat of arms

De Launay is a French toponymic surname, a contraction of "de l'Aunay", literally meaning "from Aunay", associated with the noble de Launay family. Variant: Delaunay. Notable people with the surname include:

- Anne De Launay, a pen name of Raoul Vaneigem (born 1934), Belgian writer
- Bernard-René Jourdan de Launay
- Charles de Launay, Vicomte de Launay, pen names of Delphine de Girardin (1804 – 1855), French writer
- Claude de Launay-Razilly
- Claudio Gabriele de Launay
- David de Launay
- Isaac de Launay Razilly
- Louis-Alexandre de Launay, comte d'Antraigues
- Louis Le Provost de Launay
- Marguerite de Launay, baronne de Staal
- Maurice Jean Marie Boudin de Launay de Tromelin

== See also ==
- Chateau and Seigneurie de Launay
- Joan de Launay N. Devon Arts
- Delaney/Delany, Delannoy, De Launay, Delaunay, Delauney, Delone, Deloney, Delony
