= Delannoy =

De Lannoy or Delannoy is a surname, and may refer to:

Noble Belgian House of Lannoy:

- Jean de Lannoy
- Baldwin of Lannoy
- Hugo van Lannoy
- Guillebert de Lannoy, soldier, traveller and diplomat
- Charles de Lannoy, 1st Prince of Sulmona: soldier and statesman
- Philip de Lannoy, 2nd Prince of Sulmona, military leader
- Countess Stéphanie de Lannoy, now the Hereditary Grand Duchess of Luxembourg

Others

- Albert Delannoy, long jumper
- Colinet de Lannoy, composer
- Eustachius De Lannoy, naval commander
- Henri Delannoy (1833–1915), French military officer and amateur mathematician
- Jacques Delannoy (1912–1958), French footballer
- Jean Delannoy, actor and film director
- Louis De Lannoy, cyclist
- Luc Delannoy, writer and philosopher
- Marcel Delannoy (1898–1962), French composer
- Claire Delannoy, French writer
- Robert Delannoy, World War I flying ace
- Sabrina Delannoy (born 1986), French footballer
- Sandra Delannoy, French politician

== See also ==
- Delano family
- Delannoy numbers, a mathematical sequence named after Henri Delannoy
- Delaney/Delany, Delannoy, De Launay, Delaunay, Delauney, Delone, Deloney, Delony
- Lannoy (disambiguation)
