= Delony =

Delony or DeLony is a surname. Notable people with the surname include:

- Eric DeLony (1944–2018), American historic preservationist
- Jenny Eakin Delony (1866–1949), American painter and educator
- John Delony
- Vail M. Delony

== See also ==
- Delaney/Delany, Delannoy, De Launay, Delaunay, Delauney, Delone, Deloney, Delony
