= Delone =

Delone is a name and a surname. Notable people with the name include:

- Amy deLone, American tennis player
- Boris Delone, Soviet and Russian mathematician, mountain climber, father of Nikolai
- Delone Carter (b. 1987), American football player
- Erika deLone, American tennis player
- Nikolai Borisovich Delone (1926–2008), Soviet physicist
- William H. DeLone, American organizational theorist

== See also ==
- Delone Catholic High School, McSherrystown, Pennsylvania, United States
- Delone set
- Delaney/Delany, Delannoy, De Launay, Delaunay, Delauney, Delone, Deloney, Delony
