= Delaunay =

Delaunay is a French surname. Variant: de Launay. Notable people with the surname include:

== People ==
=== Arts ===
- Catherine Delaunay (born 1969), French jazz clarinet player and composer
- Charles Delaunay (1911–1988), French author and jazz expert
- Constance Delaunay (1922-2013), French translator, playwright, novelist and short stories writer
- Jules-Élie Delaunay (1828–1891), French painter
- Louis Arsene Delaunay (1826–1903), French actor
- Robert Delaunay (1885–1941), French artist
- Joan de Launay Fine Artist, Film,Television Awards - Choral Singer
- Rose Delaunay (1857–after 1937), French opera ainger
- Sonia Delaunay (1885–1979), Ukrainian-French artist
- Vadim Delaunay (1947–1983), Russian poet and dissident

=== Football ===
- Henri Delaunay (1883–1955), French football administrator
- Jean-Pierre Delaunay (born 1966), French footballer
- Pierre Delaunay, football administrator

=== Science ===
- Boris Delaunay (1890–1980), Soviet/Russian mathematician, inventor of Delaunay triangulation
- Charles-Eugène Delaunay (1816–1872), French astronomer and mathematician
- Nikolai Delaunay, Junior (1926–2008), Soviet physicist

=== Politics ===
- Joseph Delaunay (1752–1794), sometimes called Delaunay d'Angers; a revolutionary-era French politician
- Michèle Delaunay (born 1947), member of the National Assembly of France

=== Fictional characters ===
- Various characters in the fantasy novel Kushiel's Dart (2001)

== See also ==
- Delaunay-Belleville, a French luxury automobile
- Delaunay (crater), a lunar crater
- Delaunay triangulation, a way to divide a plane into triangles
- Delaney/Delany, Delannoy, De Launay, Delaunay, Delauney, Delone, Deloney, Delony
