= Delauney =

Delauney is a surname. Notable people with the surname include:

- Alfred Delauney (1830-1894), French painter and engrave
- Clémentine Delauney (born 1987), French singer
- Herbert Delauney Hughes (1914-1995), British educationist and politician

== See also ==
- Delaney/Delany, Delannoy, De Launay, Delaunay, Delauney, Delone, Deloney, Delony
