= Lombron =

- Commune
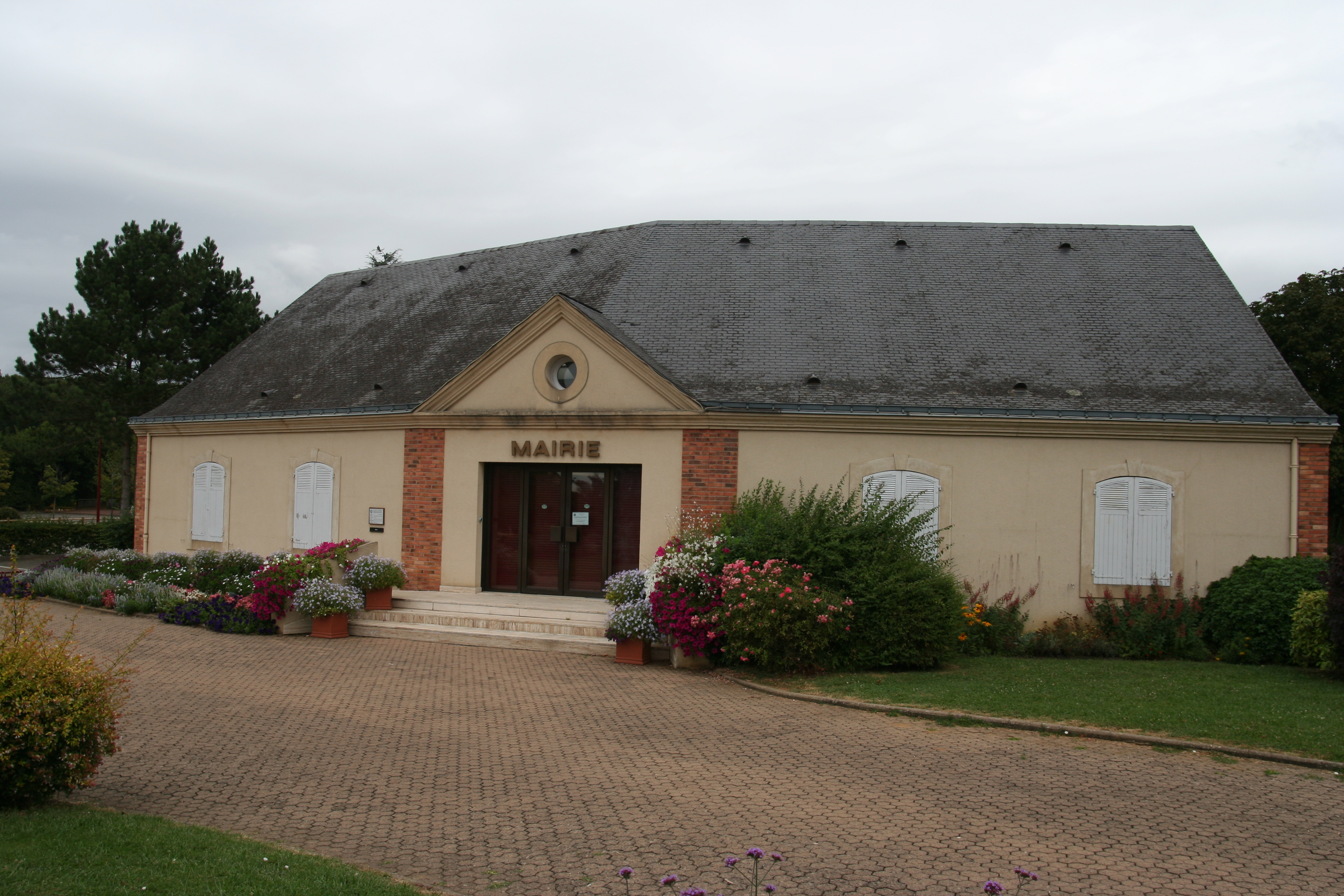
- The town hall of Lombron
- Location of Lombron
- Location within France Location within Pays de la Loire
- Coordinates: 48°04′45″N 0°25′08″E
- Country: France
- Region: Pays de la Loire
- Department: Sarthe
- Arrondissement: Mamers
- Canton: Savigné-l'Évêque
- Intercommunality: Le Gesnois Bilurien

Government
  - Mayor (2020–2026): Alain Gremillon
- Area^{1}: 24.11 km^{2} (9.31 sq mi)
- Highest elevation: 130 m (430 ft)
- Lowest elevation: 100 m (330 ft)
- Population (2023): 1,960
  - Density: 81.3/km^{2} (211/sq mi)
- Demonym(s): Lombronnais, Lombronnaise
- Time zone: UTC+01:00 (CET)
  - Summer (DST): UTC+02:00 (CEST)
- INSEE/Postal code: 72165 /72450
- ^{1} French Land Register data, which excludes lakes, ponds, glaciers > 1 km^{2} (0.386 sq mi or 247 acres) and river estuaries.

Lombron (French pronunciation: [lɔ̃bʁɔ̃]) is a commune in the Sarthe department in the region of Pays de la Loire in north-western France.

== See also ==
- Communes of the Sarthe department
- Chateau and Seigneurie de Launay
