= Information systems success model =

Theory in information systems

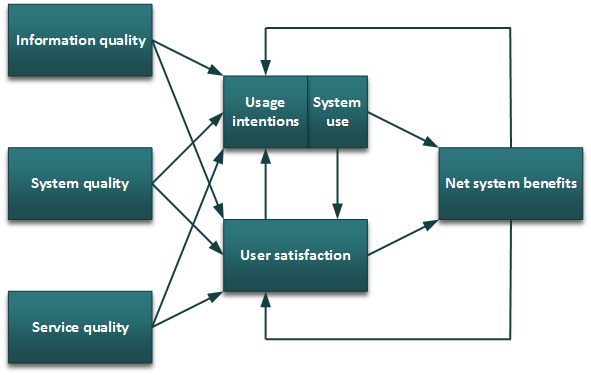
A representation of the IS success model.

The information systems success model (alternatively IS success model or Delone and McLean IS success model) is an information systems (IS) theory which seeks to provide a comprehensive understanding of IS success by identifying, describing, and explaining the relationships among six of the most critical dimensions of success along which information systems are commonly evaluated. Initial development of the theory was undertaken by William H. DeLone and Ephraim R. McLean in 1992, and was further refined by the original authors a decade later in response to feedback received from other scholars working in the area. The IS success model has been cited in thousands of scientific papers, and is considered to be one of the most influential theories in contemporary information systems research.

== Dimensions of IS success ==
The IS success model identifies and describes the relationships among six critical dimensions of IS success: information quality, system quality, service quality, system use/usage intentions, user satisfaction, and net system benefits.

=== Information quality ===
Information quality refers to the quality of the information that the system is able to store, deliver, or produce, and is one of the most common dimensions along which information systems are evaluated. Information quality impacts both a user’s satisfaction with the system and the user’s intentions to use the system, which, in turn, impact the extent to which the system is able to yield benefits for the user and organization.

=== System quality ===
As with information quality, the overall quality of a system is also one of the most common dimensions along which information systems are evaluated. System quality indirectly impacts the extent to which the system is able to deliver benefits by means of mediational relationships through the usage intentions and user satisfaction constructs.

=== Service quality ===
Along with information quality and system quality, information systems are also commonly evaluated according to the quality of service that they are able to deliver. Service quality directly impacts usage intentions and user satisfaction with the system, which, in turn, impact the net benefits produced by the system.

=== System use/usage intentions ===
Intentions to use an information system and actual system use are well-established constructs in the information systems literature. In the IS success model system use and usage intentions are influenced by information, system, and service quality. System use is posited to influence a user’s satisfaction with the information system, which, in turn, is posited to influence usage intentions. In conjunction with user satisfaction, system use directly affects the net benefits that the system is able to provide.

=== User satisfaction ===
User, and by information, system, and service quality. Like actual system use, user satisfaction directly influences the net benefits provided by an information system. Satisfaction refers to the extent to which a user is pleased or contented with the information system, and is posited to be directly affected by system use.

=== Net system benefits ===
The net benefit that an information system is able to deliver is an important facet of the overall value of the system to its users or to the underlying organization. In the IS success model, net system benefits are affected by system use and by user satisfaction with the system. In their own right, system benefits are posited to influence both user satisfaction and a user’s intentions to use the system.
