= Jet Lowe =

American photographer (born 1946)

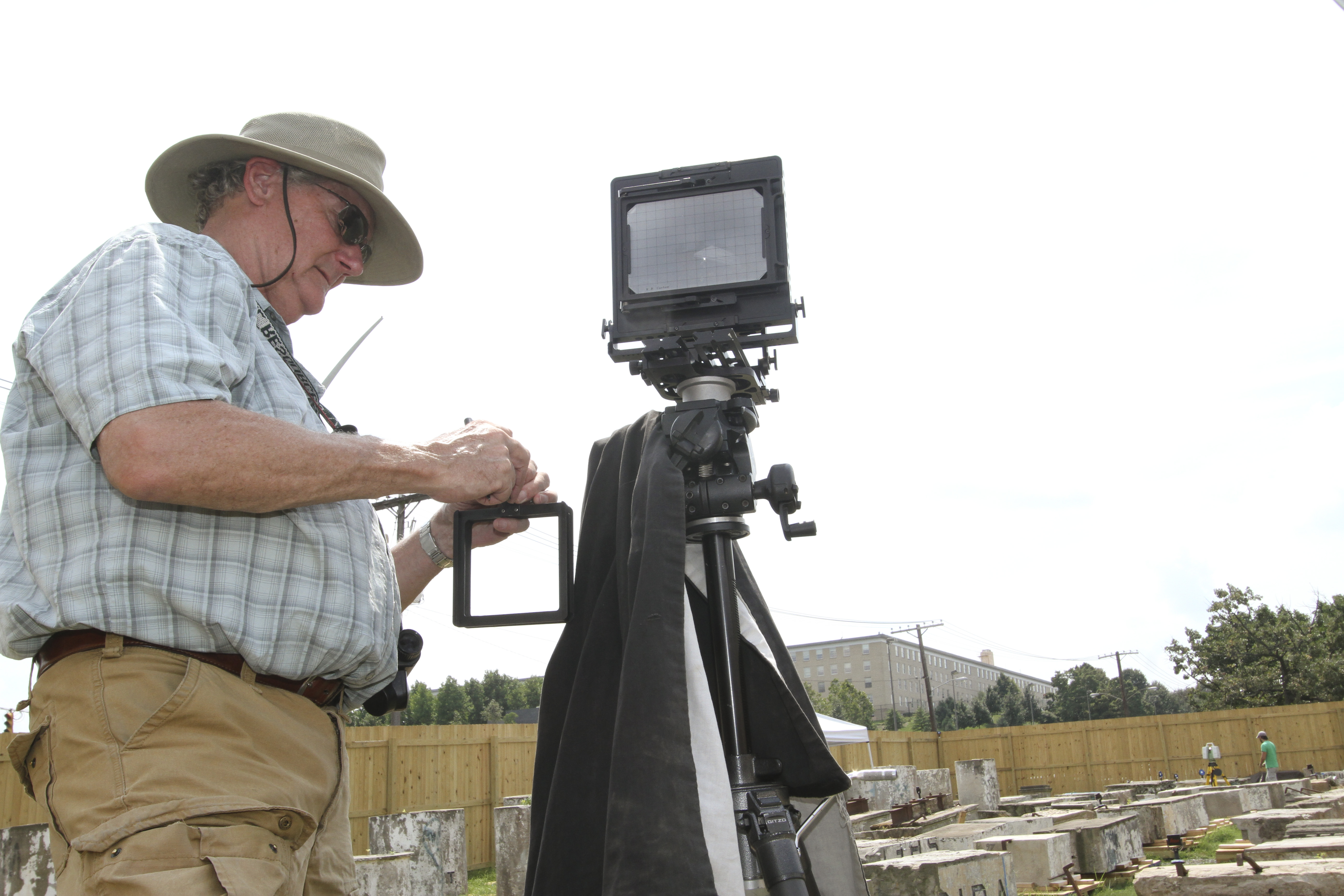
- Lowe at Arlington National Cemetery in August 2012
- Born: John T. Lowe III; 1946 (age 79–80)
- Occupation: photographer

John T. "Jet" Lowe is an American photographer. He is one of the photographers employed by the U.S. National Park Service on the Historic American Buildings Survey (HABS) and Historic American Engineering Record (HAER) projects, and was the supervisor of engineering photography for HAER until his retirement in July 2013. His book, Industrial Eye: Photographs by Jet Lowe from the Historic American Engineering Record was published in 1986 by the Preservation Press.

== Early life and education ==
John T. Lowe III was born in 1946. His father, a U.S. Navy aviator, called him "Jet." While at New College of Florida, Lowe went to Haiti for an independent study program, taking a camera with him at the last minute. He shot 20 rolls of film in the region of Cap-Haïtien. The resulting pictures were well received by his professors. In 1970 Lowe graduated from Emory University with a degree in art history, and started working for the Georgia Historical Commission, doing HABS documentation. After changing jobs, his equipment was stolen, and he worked in construction and as a courier. He was encouraged to return to photography by Richard Avedon, and moved to Washington, D.C. in 1974. He started working for HAER in 1978.

== Work ==
Lowe uses large format images to record significant and often threatened American industrial sites for the National Park Service's HAER program. These images along with an extensive architectural history and measured drawings constitutes a permanent record of the industrial sites he documents. HAER projects are housed at the Library of Congress, and many of the records are available on-line from the library's website.

Lowe's industrial photographs make up a significant portion of the HAER images collected since the founding of HAER in 1969. The National Park Service, the American Society of Civil Engineers and the Library of Congress reached an agreement to document historic sites and structures related to engineering and industry. This agreement was later ratified by four other engineering societies: the American Society of Mechanical Engineers, the Institute of Electrical and Electronics Engineers, the American Institute of Chemical Engineers, and the American Institute of Mining, Metallurgical, and Petroleum Engineers. In 1986 Lowe's work was published in the book Industrial Eye, published by the Preservation Press of the National Trust for Historic Preservation.

Lowe's images include a 2001 remake of the famous Charles Sheeler 1927 image of crossing conveyors taken at the Ford River Rouge Steel Complex.

=== Awards ===
He received the Society for Industrial Archaeology's highest honor, the General Tools Award.

Lowe's work is a major part of the permanent collections of The Library of Congress HABS/HAER program, and has been the subject of exhibitions at the CEPA Gallery,[ the Burchfield Penney Art Center, and a Smithsonian Institution traveling exhibition, Covered Bridges: Spanning the American Landscape.

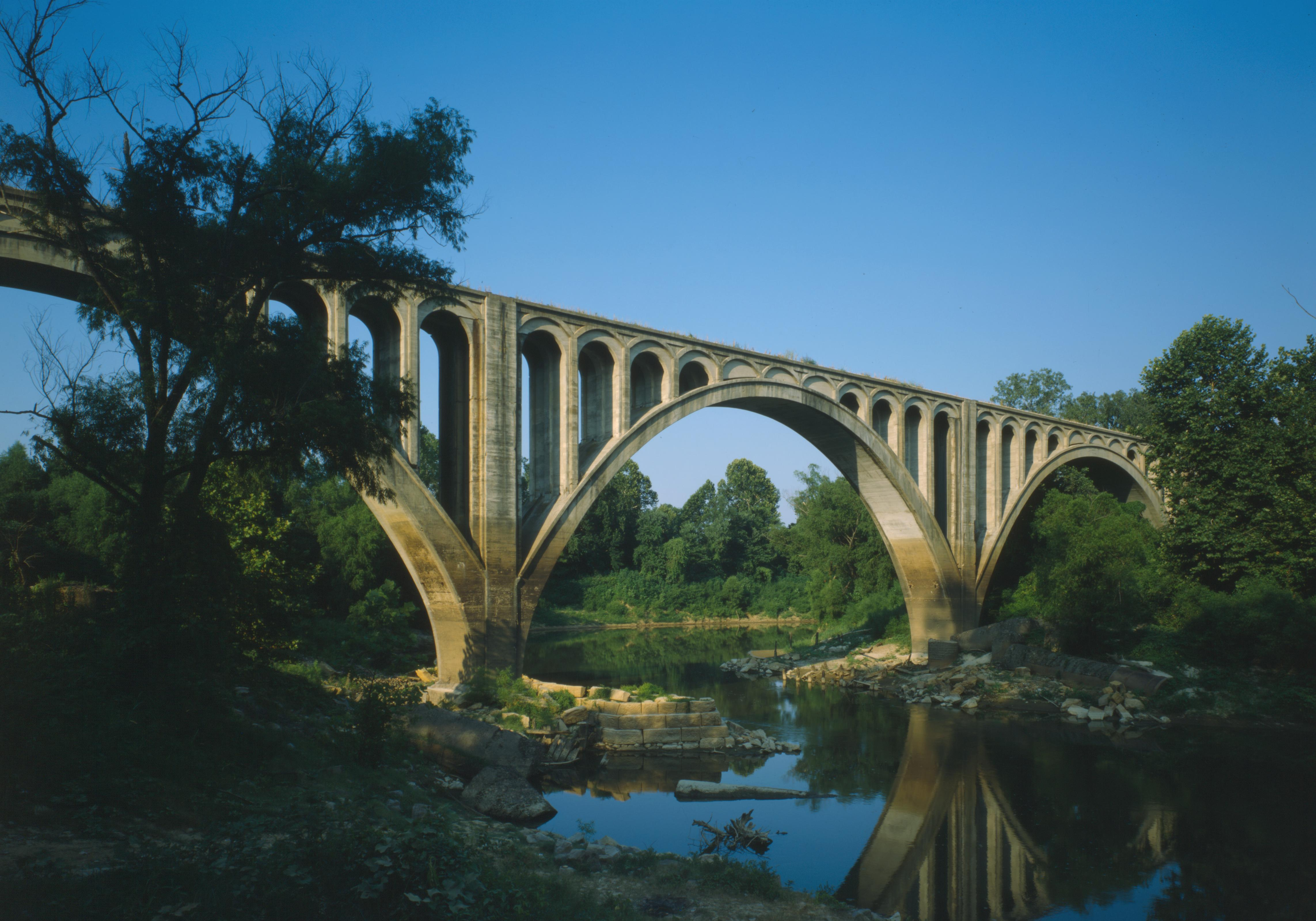
Big Black River Bridge

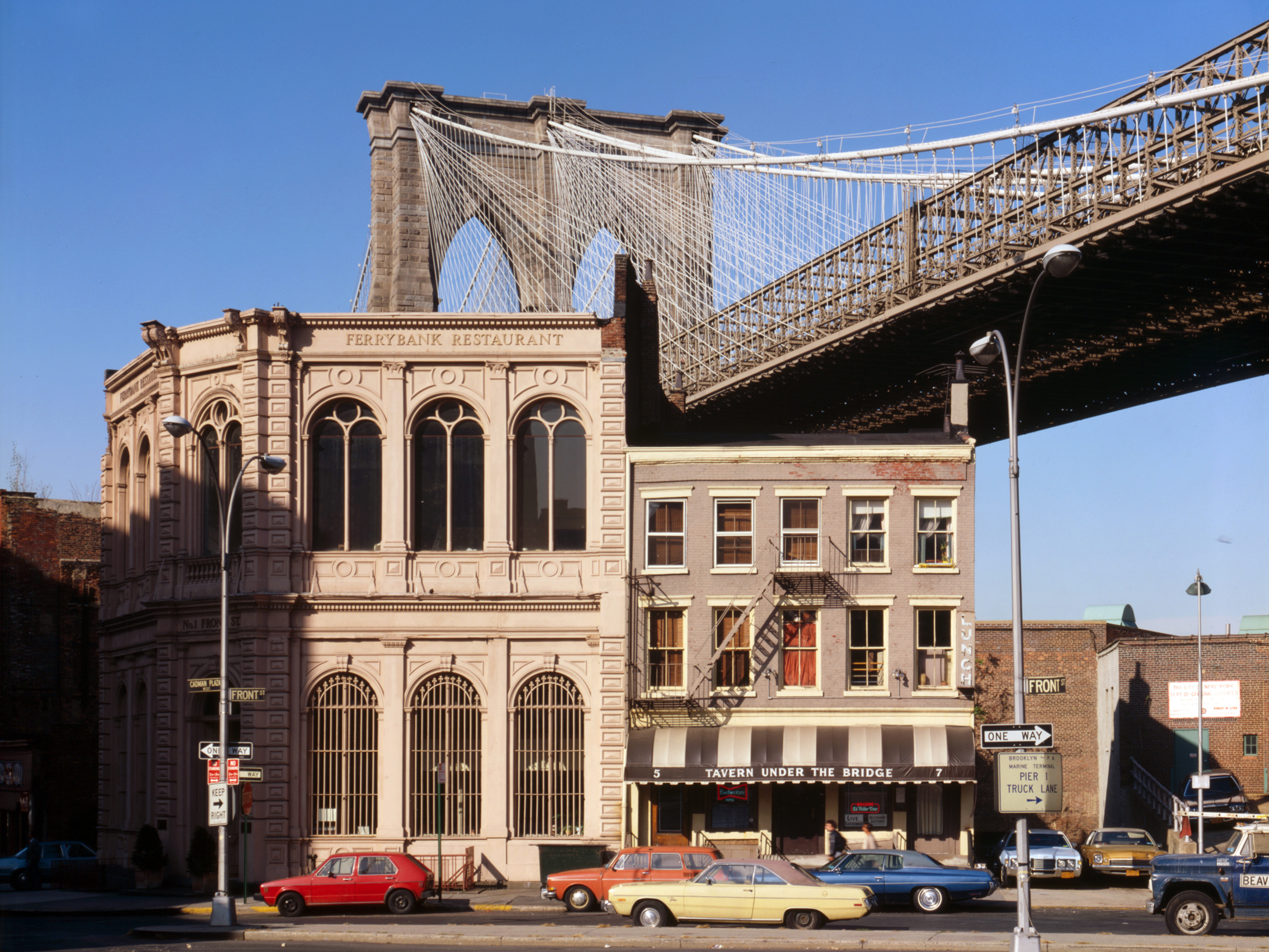
Brooklyn Bridge

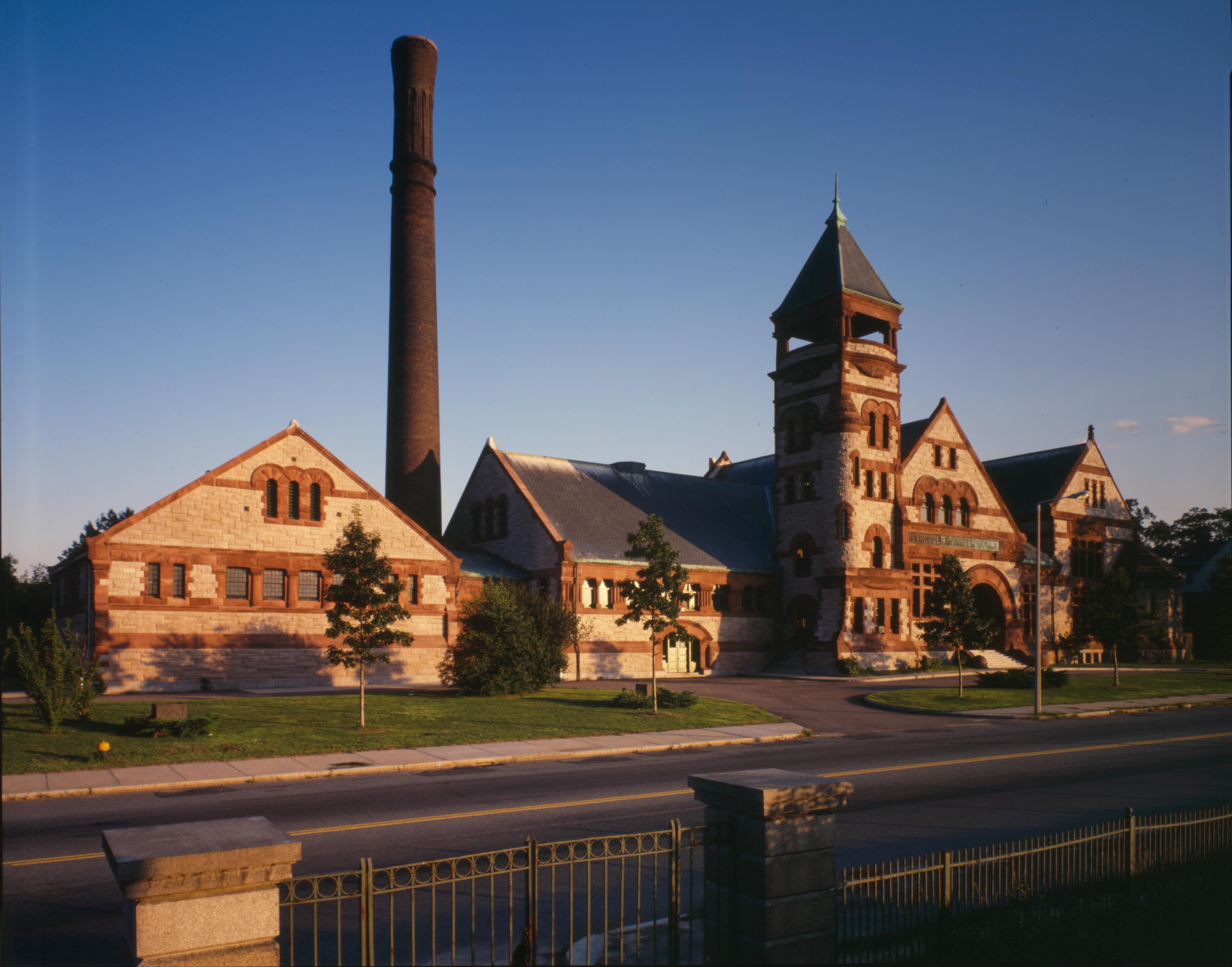
Chestnut Hill Pumping Station, Boston

== Gallery ==
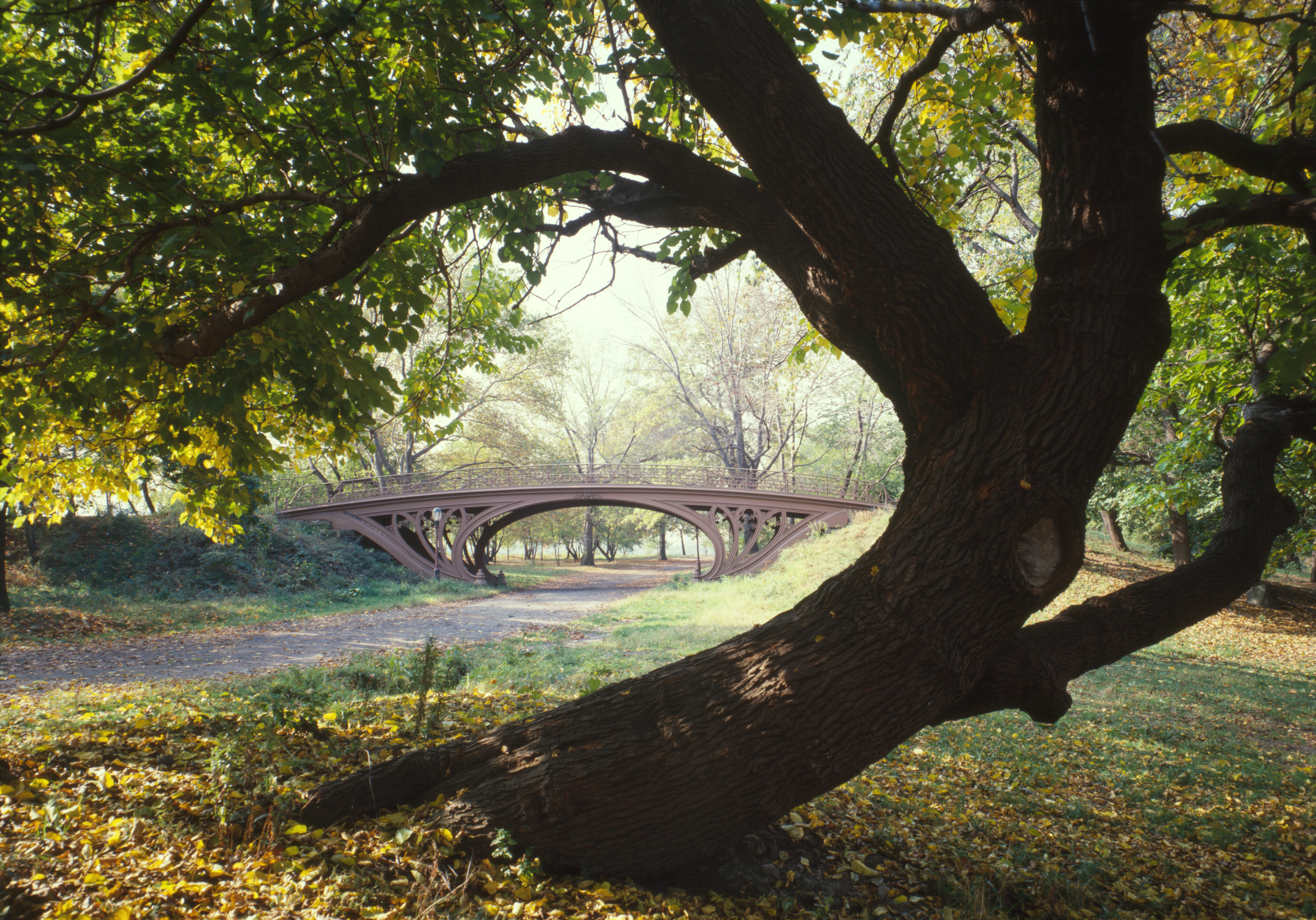
Central Park

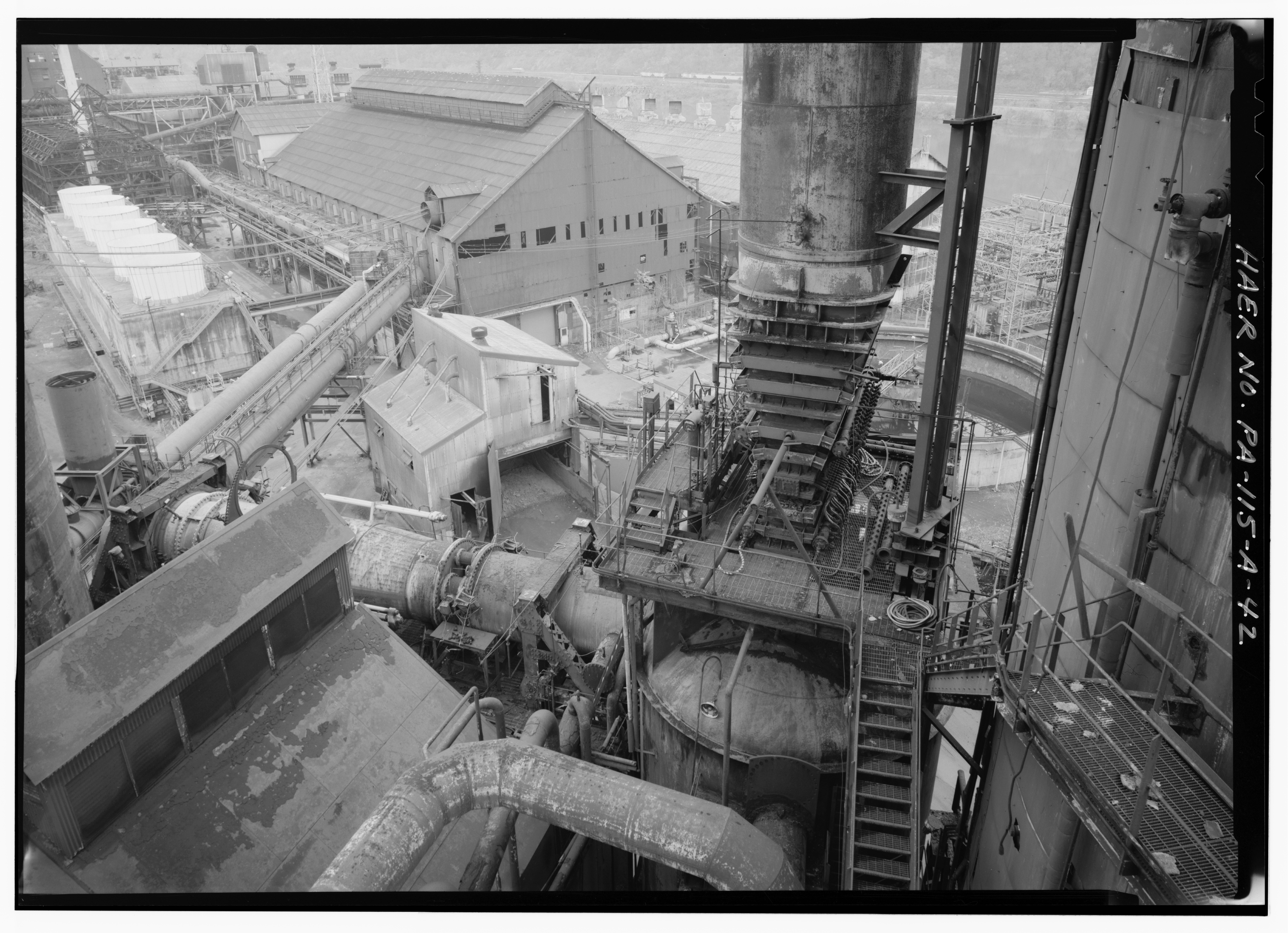
wastewater treatment plant

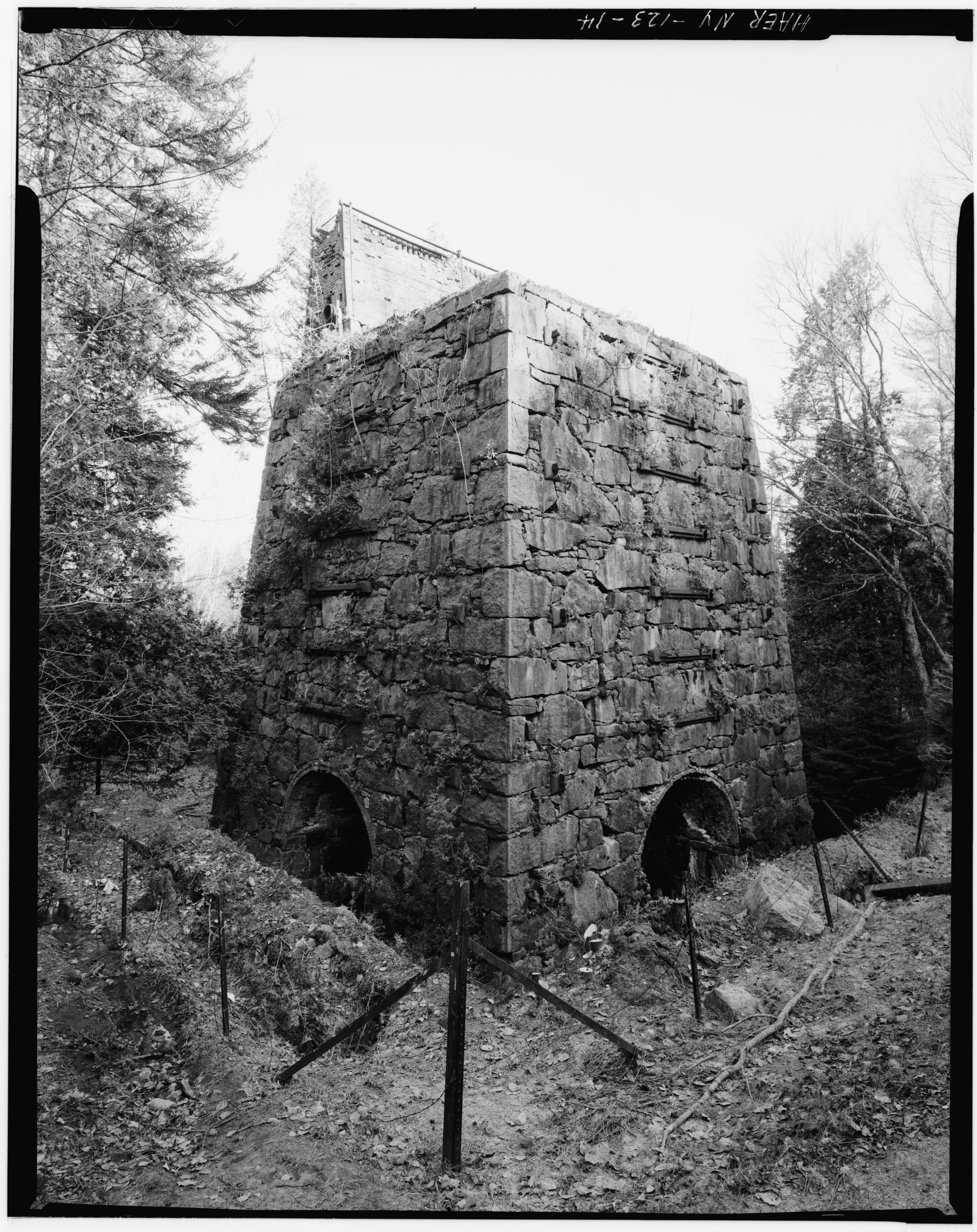
McIntyre Iron Works

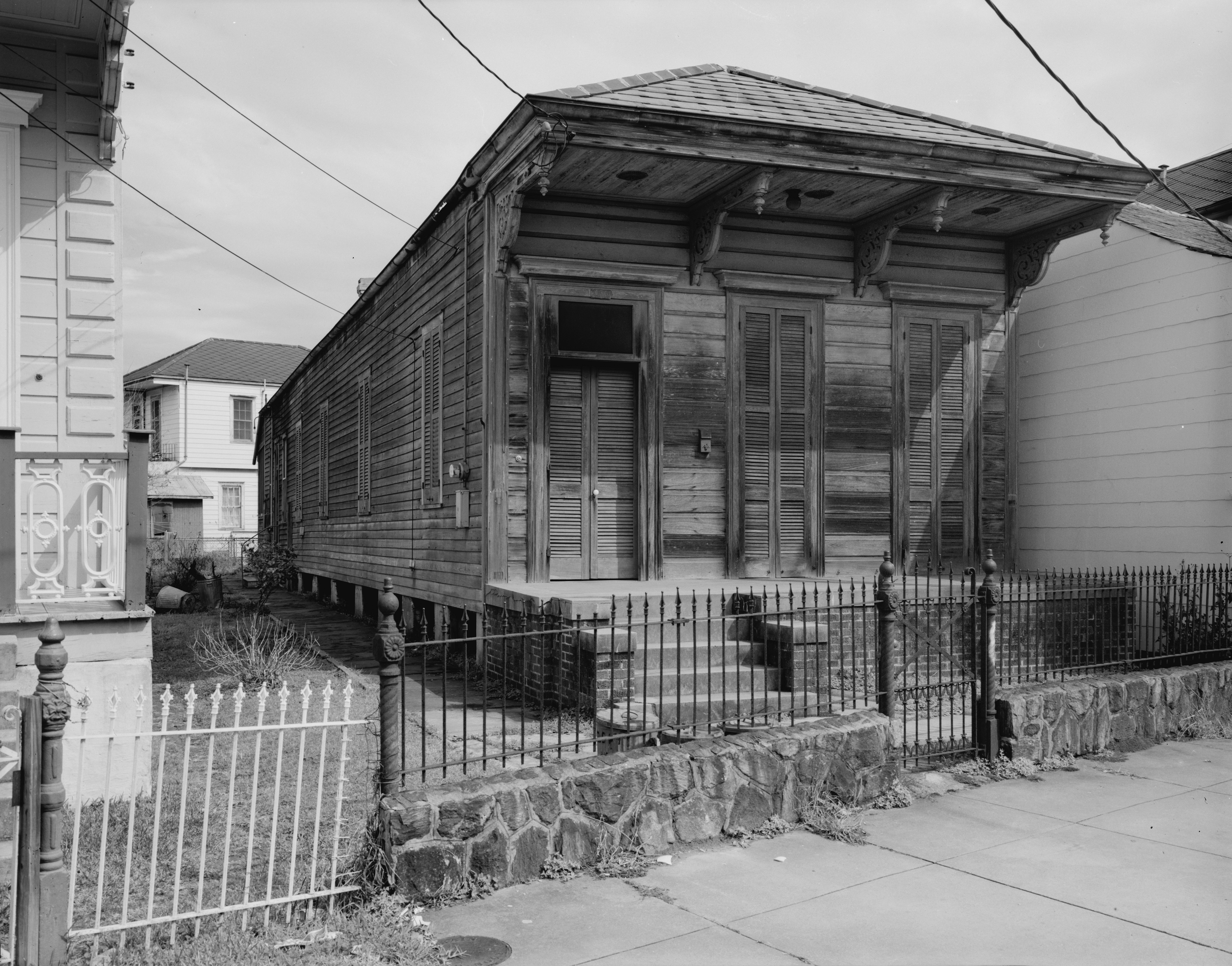
2519 Dauphine Street in Faubourg Marigny, New Orleans

== Publications ==
- Buildings of Alaska, author Alison K. Hoagland, photographer Jet Lowe, (1995) ISBN 0-19-509380-1
- Le patrimoine industriel des États-Unis, authors Maria Theresa Maiullari-Pontois, and Louis Bergeron, photographs by Jet Lowe (2000)
- Industrial Eye: Photographs by Jet Lowe from the Historic American Engineering Record, authors Michael Leccese and David Weitzman (1987) ISBN 978-0891331247
