= Skunk River (Iowa) =

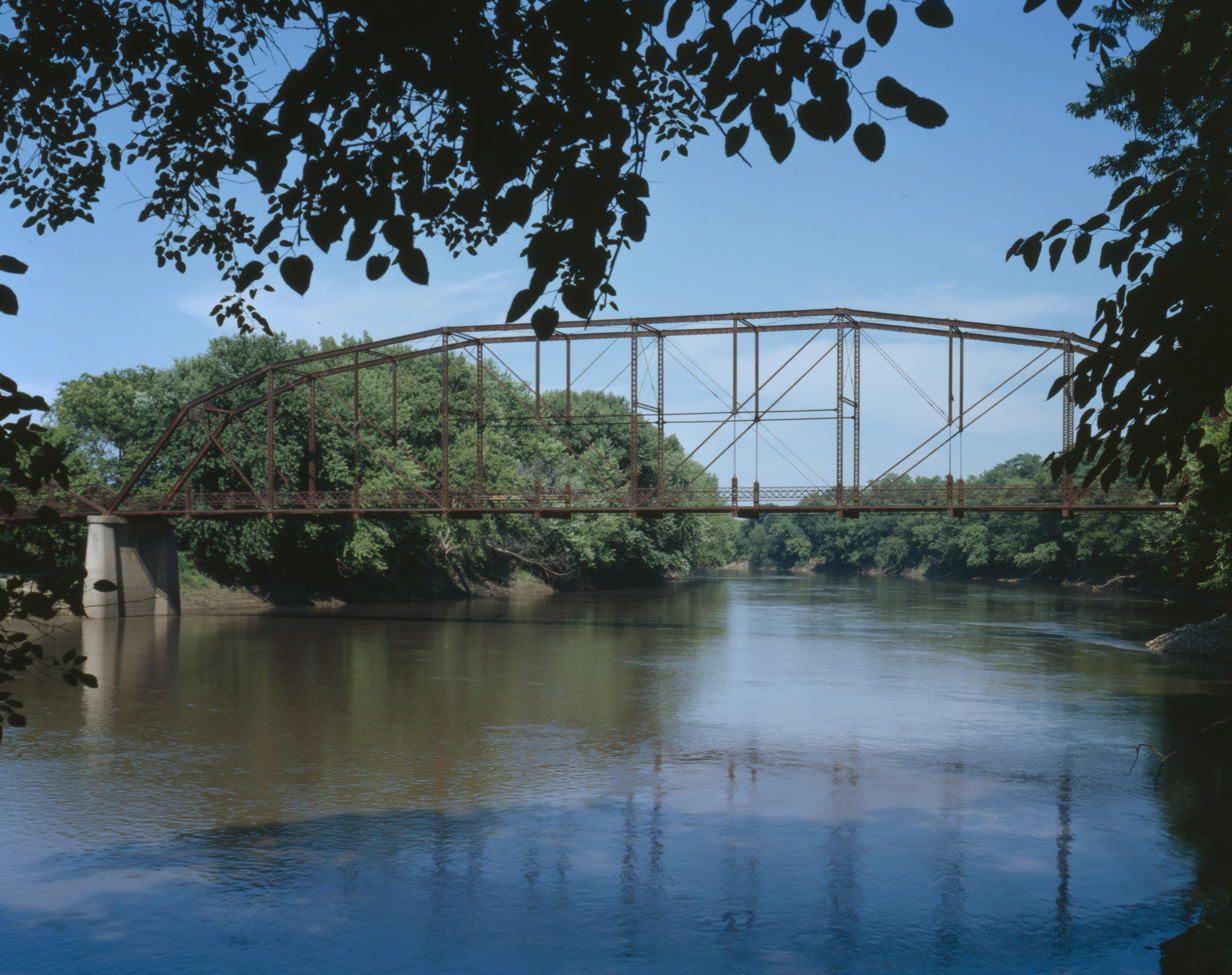

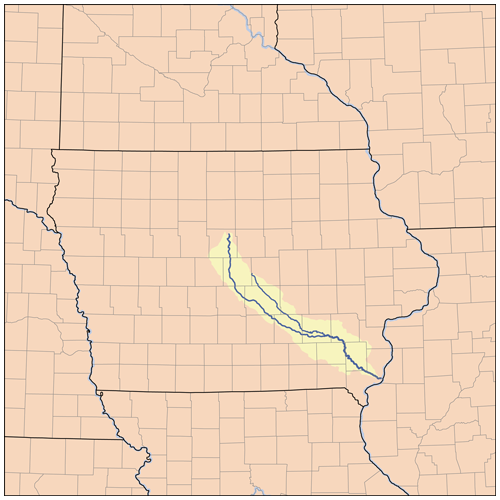
- Map showing the Skunk river, including both branches.

Location
- Country: United States
- State: Iowa
- County: Lee, Des Moines, Poweshiek, Henry, Jefferson, Washington, Keokuk, Jasper, Story, Hamilton, Mahaska, Marshall

Physical characteristics
- Source
  - coordinates: 41°14′55″N 92°01′35″W
- Mouth: Mississippi River
  - location: Burlington, Iowa, US
  - coordinates: 40°41′52″N 91°06′55″W
  - elevation: 518 ft (158 m)
- Discharge
  - location: Augusta, Iowa
  - average: 2,809 cu/ft. per sec.

Basin features
- Tributaries
  - left: South Skunk River
  - right: North Skunk River

The Skunk River is a 93-mile-long (150 km) tributary of the Mississippi River in the state of Iowa in the United States.

== Geography ==
The Skunk River rises in two branches, the South Skunk (185 miles (298 km) long) and the North Skunk (129 miles (208 km) long). The headwaters of the South Skunk are in Hamilton County in north central Iowa. It flows roughly due southward, to the west of Interstate 35, and passes through the city of Ames, before turning southeasterly. In Keokuk County, it is joined by the North Skunk, which has its headwaters in Marshall County. It then proceeds southeastward and flows into the Mississippi about five miles south of the city of Burlington.

The Iowa Department of Natural Resources has designated 33 miles of the Skunk River as a State Water Trail since 2020.

== Etymology ==
The Sauk and Meskwaki referred to the Skunk River as "Shecaqua". This name was probably mistranslated; one early settler wrote, "I was informed by Frank Labisner, United States interpreter for the Sac and Fox Indians, that the name of Skunk River was a wrong interpretation. The Indian name was Checaqua. Which, in their language is anything of a strong or obnoxious smell, such as onions. I think, that from the fact that the head waters of the stream abounded with wild onions, the interpretation should be 'Onion.'" This origin makes the river's native name a cognate of the name Chicago, the Miami-Illinois name for the wild onion.

== Habitat ==
Species of fish found in the Skunk River include smallmouth bass, gar, walleye, catfish, carp, bluegill, sheephead, bullhead, and largemouth bass, crappie, sunfish.

The river features an abundance of birds, deer, beaver, wood ducks, and raccoons. The Skunk River is lined with silver maples, sycamores, cottonwoods, and oaks along the shoreline.

The "Skunk River Navy" was founded and led by Iowa State University biology professor 'Admiral' Jim Colbert and biology advisor 'Admiral' Jim Holtz. The SRN operated from August 1998 to September 2017. The SRN focused on monitoring the biological diversity of the South Skunk River, and some of its tributaries, near Ames, Iowa as well as removal of trash from these streams. Participation in the SRN was primarily focused on students entering Iowa State in the biology major, though students in other majors, other ISU personnel, as well as other individuals participated. During the years of operation of the SRN approximately 2,400 volunteers participated and over 80 tons of trash were removed from the South Skunk River and some of its tributaries. The SRN also found, and reported, diesel fuel and sewage leaks into the South Skunk River, and its tributary Ioway Creek, respectively. These leaks were repaired by the City of Ames. Beginning in 2018 local paddling groups may use the name "Skunk River Navy", but the SRN is no longer under the auspices of the ISU Biology Program.

== See also ==
- List of Iowa rivers
- Skunk River Greenbelt
