= Ephraim R. McLean =

Ephraim R. McLean (born January 7, 1936) is an American organizational theorist, and Regents' Professor (Emeritus) of Information Systems and holder of the G.E. Smith (GRA) Eminent Scholars' Chair at the J. Mack Robinson College of Business. Known as one of the founders of the MIS discipline in the 1960s, his work with William H. DeLone on the information systems success model is world-renowned.

== Life and work ==
McLean obtained his BS and MS in Mechanical Engineering in 1958 at Cornell University, his MS in Business Administration in 1967 from Massachusetts Institute of Technology, where in 1970 he also obtained his PhD.

After his graduation at Cornell University, McLean served at the U.S. Ordnance Corps, and then joined Procter & Gamble. He moved from manufacturing management into computer systems analysis. In 1965 he joined the MIT Sloan School of Management faculty, where he wrote the MIS field's first books on computer and management. In 1969 he moved to the UCLA Anderson Graduate School of Management, where he founded one of the world's first MIS department.

Eventually in 1987 he moved to the J. Mack Robinson College of Business at the Georgia State University, where he became Professor in information Systems, chairman of the Department of Computer Information Systems, and Director of its Center for Research in Information Systems.

== Selected publications ==
- McLean, Ephraim R., and George Albert Steiner. Strategic planning for MIS. Wiley, 1977.
- Ephraim R. McLean. Decision support systems: A Decade in Perspective Noordwijkerhout, The Netherlands, 16–18 June 1986
- Turban, Ephraim R. McLean et al. Information technology for management. John Wiley & Sons, 2008.

Articles, a selection:

- Delone, William H., and Ephraim R. McLean. "Information systems success: The quest for the dependent variable." Information systems research 3.1 (1992): pages 60-95.
- Tiwana, Amrit, and Ephraim R. Mclean. "Expertise integration and creativity in information systems development." Journal of Management Information Systems 22.1 (2003): pages 13-43.
- Delone, William H., and Ephraim R. McLean. "The DeLone and McLean model of information systems success: a ten-year update." Journal of management information systems 19.4 (2003): pages 9-30.
- Delone, William H., and Ephraim R. Mclean. "Measuring e-commerce success: Applying the DeLone & McLean information systems success model." International Journal of Electronic Commerce 9.1 (2004): pages 31-47.
