= Aunay =

Aunay may refer to:

- Aunay-en-Bazois, commune in the Nièvre department in central France
- Aunay-les-Bois, commune in the Orne department in north-western France
- Aunay-sous-Auneau, commune in the Eure-et-Loir department in northern France
- Aunay-sous-Crécy, commune in the Eure-et-Loir department in northern France
- Aunay-sur-Odon, commune in the Calvados department in the Basse-Normandie region in north-western France
- Saint-Georges-d'Aunay, commune in the department of Calvados in the Basse-Normandie region in northern France
- Saint-Germain-d'Aunay, commune in the Orne department in north-western France
- Gauthier and Philippe d'Aunay, brothers and 13th century French courtiers tortured and executed in the Tour de Nesle Affair
