= William H. DeLone =

William Hook DeLone (born September 28, 1946) is an American organizational theorist, and Professor at the American University, Department of Information Technology, known for his work with Ephraim R. McLean on the information systems success model and on "measurement of information systems effectiveness."

== Life and work ==
DeLone obtained his BS from the Villanova University, his MS from Carnegie-Mellon University, and his PhD in Computers and Information Systems in 1983 from the University of California, Los Angeles with the thesis, entitled "Determinants of success for small business computer systems."

After his graduation DeLone started his academic career, and moved to the Kogod School of Business at the American University in 1992, where he is appointed Professor at the Department of Information Technology.

Delone's research interests are in the fields of the "coordination effectiveness and project success in globally distributed software development teams... [and] the effective deployment of information and communications technology in developing countries."

== Selected publications ==
- DeLone, William H. and Clifford L. Fagan, A Collection of Comparatives: An Application to the Tourist Economy of the Virgin Islands, 1979
- DeLone, William H. Determinants of success for small business computer systems. Thesis (Ph. D.), University of California, Los Angeles, 1983.

Articles, a selection:

- DeLone, William H., and Ephraim R. McLean. "Information systems success: The quest for the dependent variable." Information systems research 3.1 (1992): 60–95.
- Delone, William H., and Ephraim R. McLean. "The DeLone and McLean model of information systems success: a ten-year update." Journal of management information systems 19.4 (2003): 9-30.
- Delone, William H., and Ephraim R. Mclean. "Measuring e-commerce success: Applying the DeLone & McLean information systems success model." International Journal of Electronic Commerce 9.1 (2004): 31–47.
