= Heritage Documentation Programs =

Division of the U.S. National Park Service

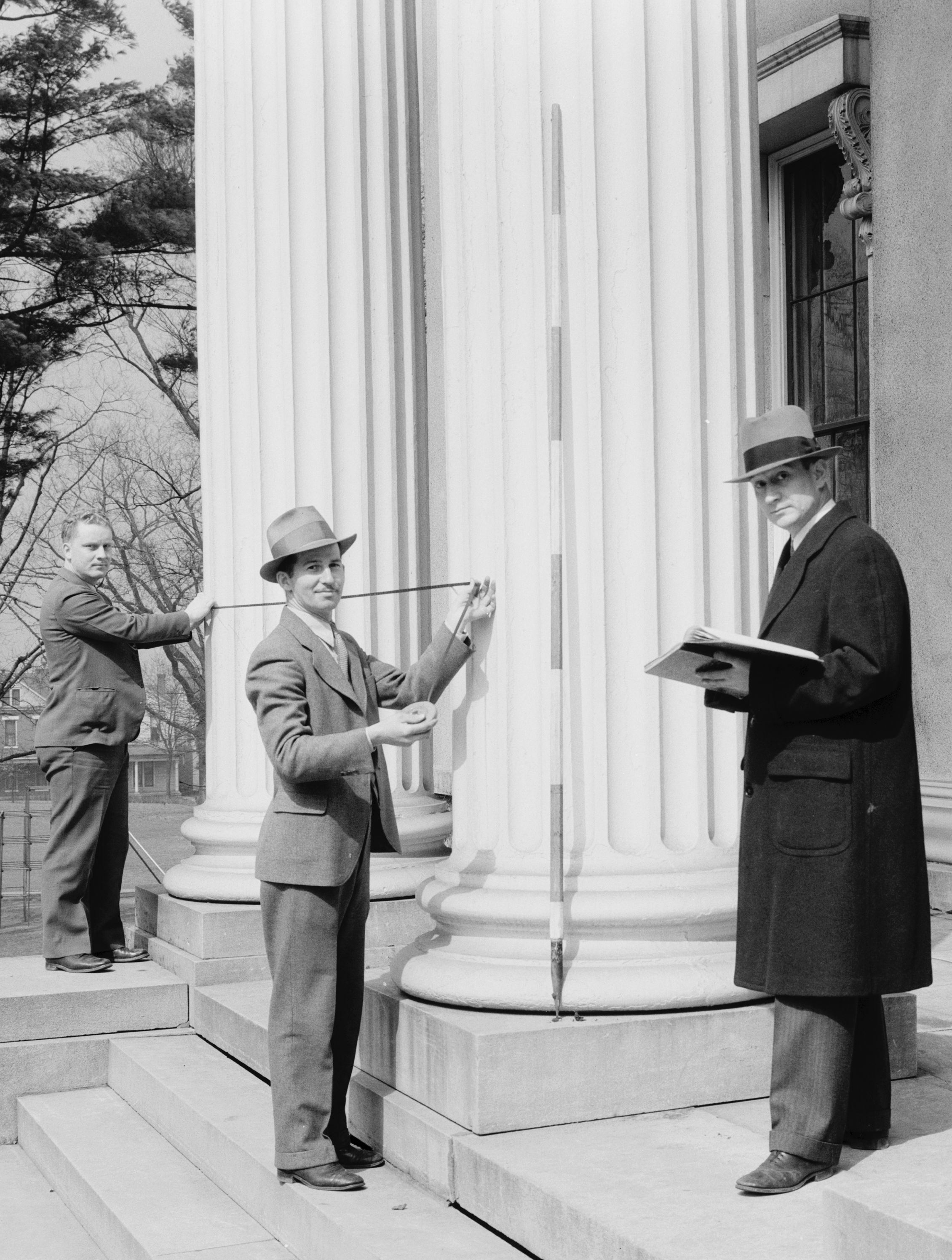
The Heritage Documentation Programs team measures the Kentucky School for the Blind in Louisville, Kentucky, in 1934.

Heritage Documentation Programs (HDP) is a division of the U.S. National Park Service (NPS). It administers three programs established to document historic places in the United States: the Historic American Buildings Survey (HABS), the Historic American Engineering Record (HAER), and the Historic American Landscapes Survey (HALS). Its records include measured drawings, archival photographs, and written reports, all archived in the Library of Congress' Prints and Photographs Division.

== History ==
=== Historic American Buildings Survey ===
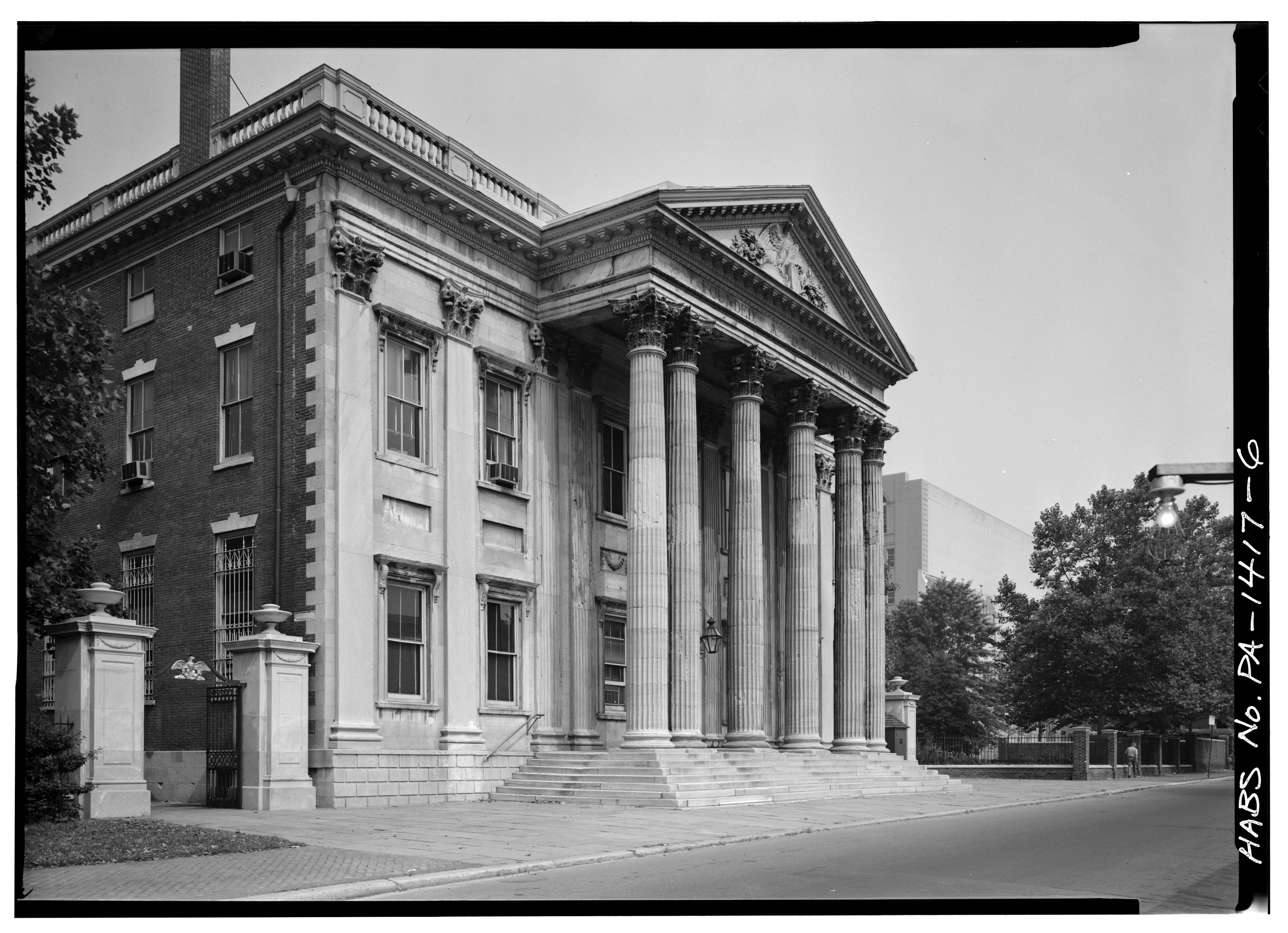
An HABS photograph of the First Bank of the United States in Philadelphia

In 1933, the Historic American Buildings Survey was established following a proposal by Charles E. Peterson, a young landscape architect in the National Park Service. Peterson proposed that the survey would be "Almost a complete resume of the builder's art".

Though it was founded as a temporary, "ten-week" constructive make-work program for architects, draftsmen, and photographers left jobless by the Great Depression, the Historic American Buildings Survey has endured to this day.

The program was later supported through the Historic Sites Act of 1935.

Guided by field instructions from Washington, D.C., the first HABS recorders were tasked with documenting a representative sampling of the nation's architectural heritage.

They began to document the built environment in the United States, conducting multi-format surveys that have since amassed "more than 581,000 measured drawings, large-format photographs, written histories, and original field notes for more than 43,000 historic structures and sites dating from Pre-Columbian times to the twentieth century".

By creating an archive of historic architecture, HABS provided a database of primary source material and documentation for the then-fledgling historic preservation movement. Peterson stated that the survey initially would, "...include public buildings, churches, residences, bridges, forts, barns, mills, shops, rural outbuildings, and any other kind of structure of which there are good specimens extant". The acting Chief of HABS, Catherine Lavoie, stated in 2011 that HABS was "Documenting the worthy and not just the wealthy".

Earlier private projects that pre-dated HABS included Eleanor Raymond's Early Domestic Architecture of Pennsylvania (1931), Charles Morse Stotz's Western Pennsylvania Architectural Survey, and the White Pine Series of Architectural Monographs. Many of their contributors later joined the HABS program.

Notable HABS photographers included Jack Boucher, who worked for the project for over four decades, Robert W. Tebbs, Richard Koch, and Jet Lowe.

=== Historic American Engineering Record ===
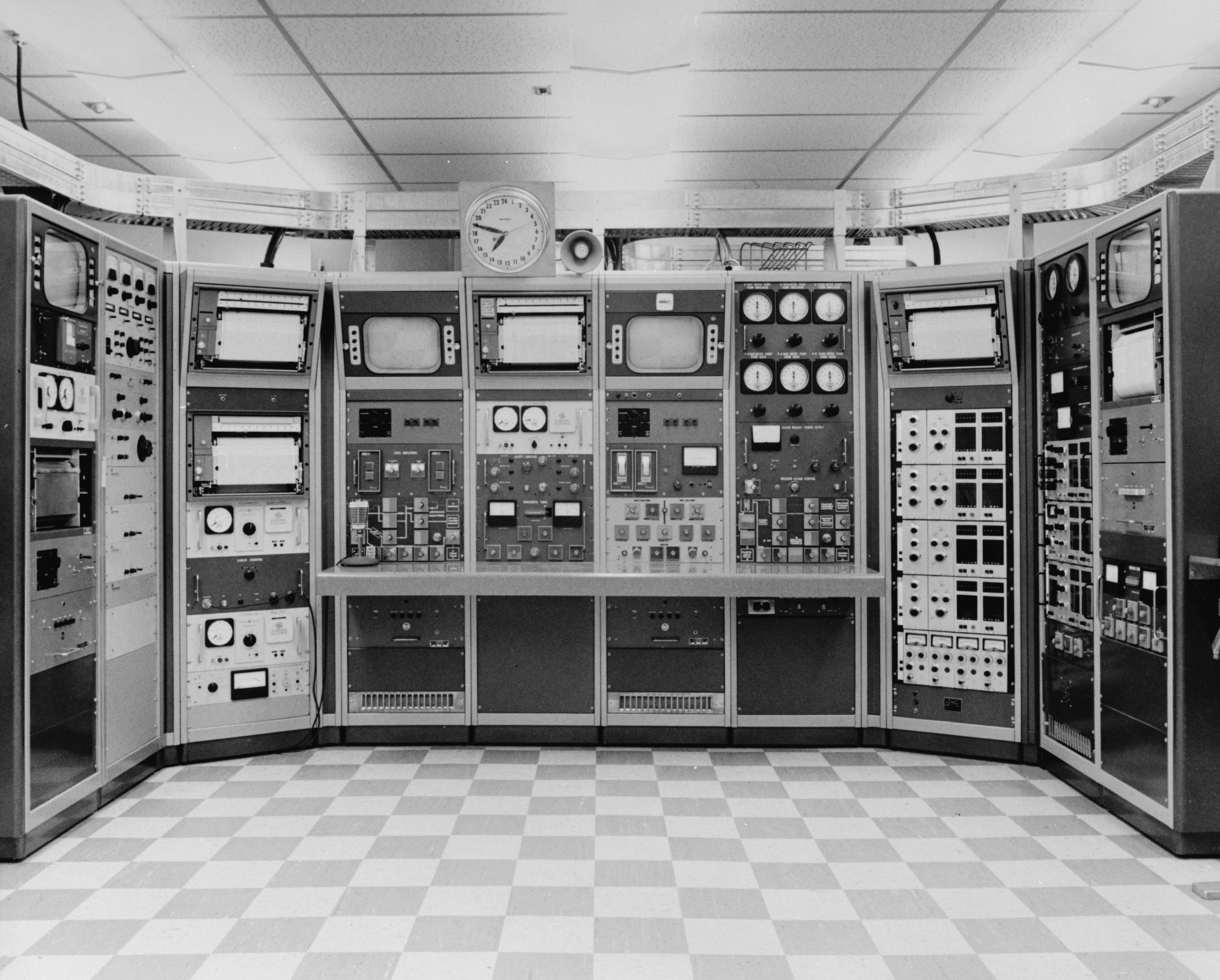
An HAER photograph of the Rocky Flats Plant in Boulder, Colorado

The Historic American Engineering Record (HAER) program was founded on January 10, 1969, by NPS and the American Society of Civil Engineers. HAER documents historic sites, structures, mechanical, and engineering artifacts. The Maritime Administration works with HAER to "document historic vessels prior to their disposal."

Since the advent of HAER, the combined program is typically called "HABS/HAER". Eric DeLony headed HAER from 1987 to 2003.

=== Historic American Landscapes Survey ===
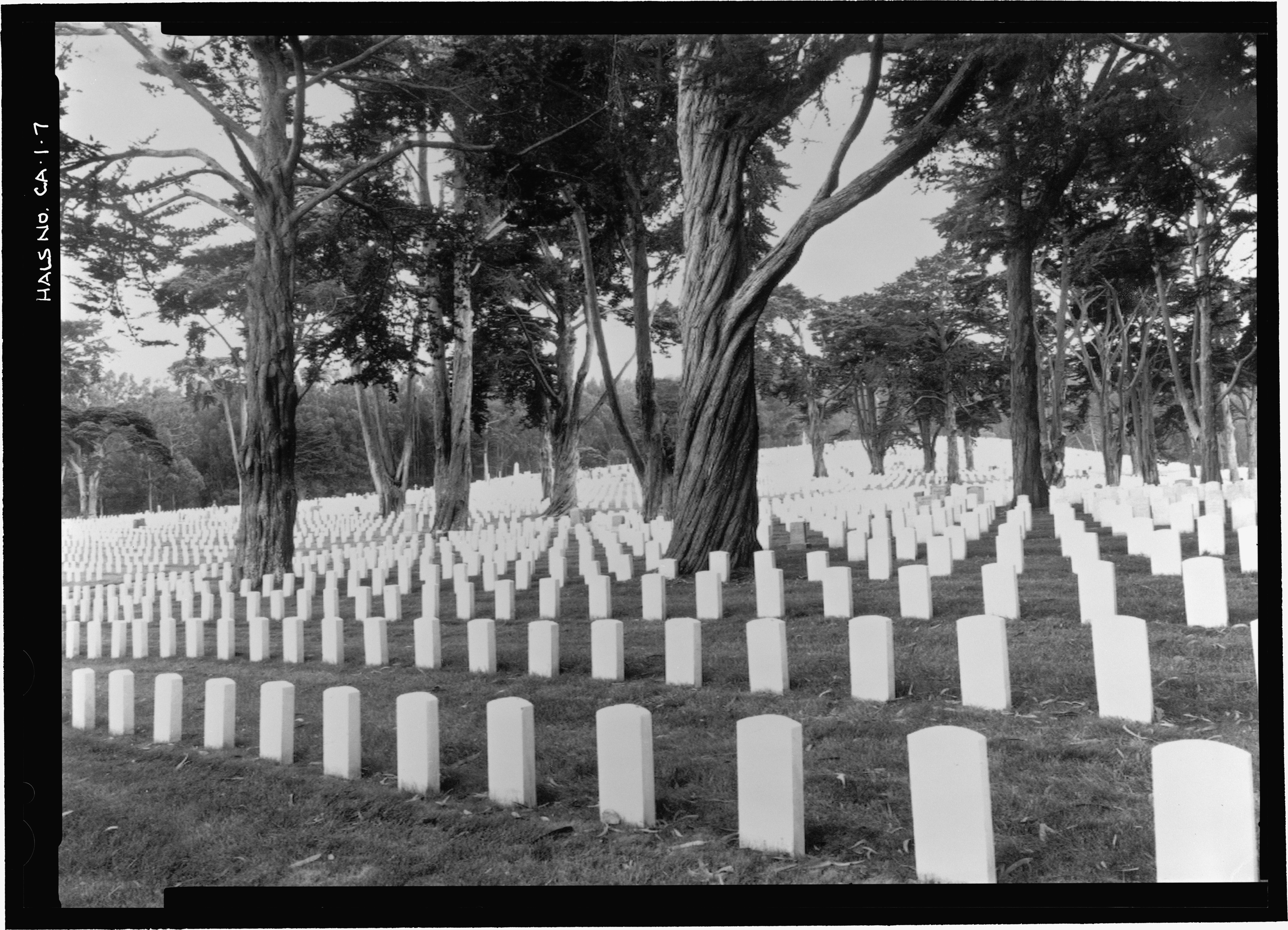
A HALS photograph of San Francisco National Cemetery in San Francisco

In October 2000, NPS and the American Society of Landscape Architects established a sister program, the Historic American Landscapes Survey, to systematically document historic American landscapes.

A predecessor, the Historic American Landscape and Garden Project, recorded historic Massachusetts gardens between 1935 and 1940. That project was funded by the Works Progress Administration, but was administered by HABS, which supervised the collection of records.

In 2001, the NPS, along with the Library of Congress and the American Society of Landscape Architects, signed a Memorandum of Understanding establishing a working relationship among the three organizations. Following the signing of this agreement, these organizations together signed the Tripartite Agreement in 2010, making "HALS a permanent federal program."

The NPS oversees the planning and operations of HALS, standardizes formats, and develops guidelines for recording landscapes.

=== Library of Congress ===
The permanent collection of HABS/HAER/HALS is housed at the Library of Congress, the national library of the United States. Many images, drawings, and documents are available through the Prints and Photographs Online Catalog, including proposed, demolished, and existing structures, as well as locales, projects, and designs. The HABS and HAER collections are among the largest and most heavily used in the division.

== See also ==
- Jack Boucher, former HABS/HAER photographer
- Eric DeLony, former chief of HAER
- Jet Lowe, former HAER photographer
- National Register of Historic Places
