= Chateau and Seigneurie de Launay =

Château de Launay
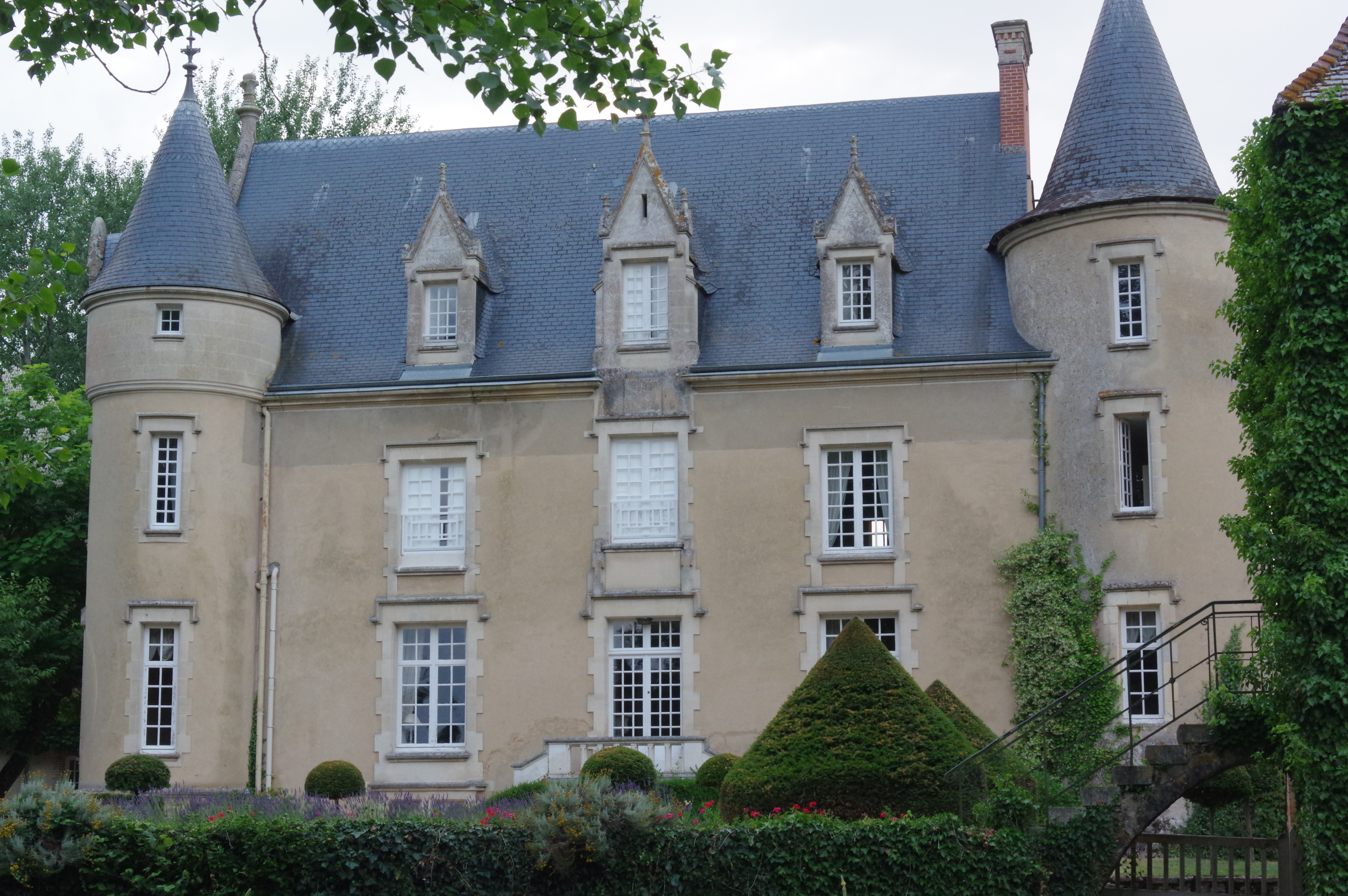
- Interactive map of the Château de Launay area

General information
- Type: Castle
- Location: Lombron, Sarthe, France
- Coordinates: 48.094°N 0.402°E

The Château and Seigneurie de Launay are the estates and Castle of Launay that are situated in western France in the Perche Sarthois. The location of the castle is near the village of Lombron, in the Department of Sarthe.

== Middle Ages ==
The Seigneurie or Châtellenie or Fief of Launay makes casual appearance in documents dating to the early 11th century. Reference to the current Château de Launay first appears in the late 14th century in the form of transfer documents. The history of Launay, at one time one of the most powerful seigneuries in western France, is steeped in the events of the last 600 years.

The early history is dependent on archival material which is incomplete. Seigneur (lord) Robin de Launay was the most powerful of the 22 vassals to the Count of Bresteau whose lands spanned seven parishes in western France. Much of the count's holdings were lost in the Hundred Years War. The lands and castle of Launay survived the wars though Robin de Launay did not.

In 1404 the daughter of Robin de Launay inherited the properties and the associated title. Soon thereafter she married Pierre de Milon, Seigneur de Mortrie and Lavigne, the latter being a royal vassalage. In 1455 the Seigneurie of Launay passed to Jehan de Bernay who, like Pierre de Milon, was Seneschal to Montfort.

== Renaissance ==
Letters from 1509, 1510, and 1527 make reference to Pierre de Bernay (likely the son of Jehan) as Seigneur de Launay. A rather melodramatic history involving Pierre survives in several sources. In 1523 de Bernay hid Gabrielle d’ Harcourt (age 14 years) at Launay on behalf of his friend Comte (count) Charles de Coesmes, Seigneur de Lucé. Charles was widowed when Gabrielle's older sister, his first wife, died a few months earlier. According to several accounts, Gabrielle was more than willing to marry Charles but her mother Anne de St. Germain was strongly opposed. Ultimately, Gabrielle and Charles married in a clandestine ceremony near Château de Launay on 28 December 1523. Anne de St. Germain pursued Charles de Coesmes and Pierre de Bernay relentlessly. She succeeded in obtaining a royal decree (François I) condemning both men to public decapitation. It was specified that their corpses should remain on display in front of the gates to Anne's castle (Château de Bonnétable). Both men, along with Gabrielle and a few attendants fled and remained on the move for the next year and a half. Taking advantage of the imprisonment of François I, following his defeat at the Battle of Paire, Charles appealed to the Duchess of Angoulême. Acting on behalf of François I, the duchess granted a pardon to Charles. No mention was made of Pierre, however.

Charles and Gabrielle were able to return to the region around Bonnétable. They eventually became favorites of François and his court. Charles' Châtellenie of Lucé was eventually elevated to a barony. The couple divided their time between Bonnétable and the royal court in Paris. Charles died at age 54 in 1543; Gabrielle remarried 13 months later. Her second marriage (Seigneur de Pescheray) was a short one. She died in 1546 at age 36.

To a degree Pierre remained a fugitive. Records reveal that he was arrested on 6 October 1525. The death sentence, still in place, was not carried out but he was forced to pay a heavy fine in 1526. Beyond this all that is known of Pierre de Bernay is that he had a son, Jehan de Bernay, who inherited the Seigneurie de Launay.

In 1551 the Seigneurie de Launay passed from the de Bernay family to the wealthy du Gronchay family. For the first time in its history, the transfer of the château, its lands and title was through sale rather than inheritance or marriage. Over the next three generations, seven members of the du Gronchay clan held the title and property at one time or another. In 1607 the surviving children of Jérôme de Gronchay, Jacquine (b. 1578) and Catherine (b. 1579), Dames de Larières and Launay inherited. When Jacquine married Jehan de Breton, Seigneur de la Calabriere, a few months later, Jehan became Seigneur de Launay, as well as Vaibesnard and Pouvray. Jehan died sometime before 1640, Jacquine then regained the position of Dame de Launay as well as the other seigneuries that had been controlled by her husband.

In 1643 Robert le Balleur, son of Catherine du Gronchet and her husband Jean le Balleur, acquired Launay, Jacquine having died without heirs. According to the Charter of Launay, on 23 April 1650, Robert le Balleur, knight, Seigneur de Landres, Knight of the Royal Order, Chamberlain to the King, Sherif of Perche, Seigneur de Launay, Vaibesnard, and Pouvray, made an oath of filet to the Count of Bresteau. The charter shows that the oath was repeated in 1654. The oath was taken up by Catherine le Balleur in 1666 and again in 1671, having inherited from her husband, Robert. Catherine's son, Henri, signed the oath in 1683.

In 1694 Henri le Balleur, in the presence of Le Mans notaries, Victor Siger and Guillaume Foin, sold to Monsieur and Madame André Guyonneau, king's councillor and lieutenant, Seneschal of Le Mans,

The Seigneurie and Château of Launay consisting of numerous bedrooms, ground floor rooms, staircases, a tower, and an office, under which are found a wine cellar, kitchen and bakery, and also including other towers, a stable, a vestibule, the major bedrooms with office, granary, two pavilions with fireplaces, another stable, a butchery, a small garden, and two courtyards all enclosed by a moat with drawbridge, a system for drainage, a surrounding path, an enclosed garden, sometimes referred to as La Grandmaison; also arable lands to include: Guérault, Petit Guérault, and Chalopiniere.

Fiefs: the Fief of Launay including the parishes of Lombron and La Chapelle St. Rèmy; the Fief of Pouvray including the parish of St. Célerin.

The right to the pew in the Sainte Barbe Chapel of [St. Martin's] Church in Lombron.

The right to an unused chapel within the St. Antoine’s Chapel of the large cemetery of Mayenne (the chapel having been founded by Jean Jeray, chaplain to lepers, in 1494)

The right to impose high justice in the surrounding lands and forests.

The sale was transacted at a price of 150,479 livres. The new Seigneur de Launay, André Guyonneau, was king's lieutenant, magistrate of Le Mans and advisor to the king. In 1692 he married the very wealthy Françoise Thérèse Hoyau. Their son, François Guyonneau, born in 1696, took charge of André's properties on his death in 1722. Little is known of François; he died in 1760 leaving behind two children, Anne Thérèse and François André.

Anne Thérèse was born 25 August 1728. She was married to the Seigneur de Gigny in 1747. When he died in 1758 she was left with quite a fortune. Contemporaries described her subsequent life as frivolous in the extreme. She managed to spend the entire fortune before dying in poverty and obscurity in 1770.

== French Revolution and 19th century ==
Her brother, François André Guyonneau, was the first to style himself as Sieur de Grandmaison. He pursued a military career, first as a lieutenant in the "Iron Regiment", later as Captain of the Queen's household. He died in January 1794.

The Lombron Parish registry recorded that on Sunday, 18 September 1762 much of the seigneurial Grandmaison was destroyed by fire. It was rebuilt and somewhat enlarged over the next two years. In another set back many of the Launay properties were confiscated by the Republicans (French Revolution) in June 1791.

Three children were born to André Guyonneau and his wife, Anne Gabrielle Harrison d’ Auvours. Two boys died as young children. A daughter, Anne Françoise, was born 1 December 1772. She married Jacques Louis Belin de Béru (twice her age at the time of their wedding in January 1796). Despite the seizure of property by the Republic, Anne was quite wealthy at the time of her marriage; her most valuable asset was the Domaine of Grandmaison. Louis was imprisoned in Paris during the Terror. He would have been executed if not for the timely fall from power of Robespierre. Louis went on to have a long and successful career in the National Assembly. He died at age 81 in 1828; Anne died 14 September 1840. At the time of her death the Domaine de Grandmaison included 125 ha. The holdings included the château as well as named properties: la Furetière, la Chalopinière, les Petits and Grand Guéraule and le Degoutier. Anne and Jacques de Grandmaison had no children. Thus, after eight centuries, the powerful Domaine de Launay was poised to be dismembered.

The greater part of the domaine, including the château and 101 ha of land were acquired (partly through inheritance, partly through purchase) by the widow, Madame Duqué of LeMans. Over the remainder of the 19th century ownership of the château changed hands four more times. Much of the land was sold off. At its nadir Grandmaison/ Launay included only 3.4 ha of land.

== World War II and 20th century ==
In 1912 the property was purchased by the wealthy Rolot family of Paris. It became the principal residence of the son, Jacques Rolot, having earlier served the small family as a summer home. Jaques Rolot fled with his family in advance of the invading Germans in 1940. The château was occupied by the Germans throughout most of the war, serving as a command center (9th Panzer Division) and quarters for German officers. Early on, under the direction of the propaganda officer assigned to the unit most of the extensive library was burned. Fortunately, many of the unique historical documents in the library were among the few volumes spared. On 9 August 1944 the château and surrounding regions were liberated by the U.S. 5th Armored Division and the 79th Infantry Division. Unfortunately the retreating Germans took time to vandalize the château extensively. Following the war, Jacques returned to Lombron but did not resume residence at the château. He did oversee considerable repair and restoration.

Through the 1950s the château and its meager remaining land changed hands numerous times. Ultimately it was acquired by an unremarkable local who lived there with his family for a decade. To the previous insults of fire, political confiscation, war and vandalism was now added the shameless pillage and sale of historic fixtures. Arguably Launay was at its historic ebb when it was sold to Marcel-Pierre Cléach and his wife in 1970.

== Recent history ==
Monsieur Cléach was early in his political career in 1970. He would go on to become one of the longest serving and most powerful French Senators of the Fifth Republic. He also began the process of restoring Launay to something of its noble past. He extensively repaired and upgraded the interior and also undertook ambitious renovations of the west wing of the château. He began the process of reversing the damage done during and subsequent to the war, a project which continues to the present. In 1979 Cléach, having acquired the large Château de Lorresse sold Launay to Jacques Maes. Maes continued with improvements to the buildings and repurchased some of the former land holdings, bringing the current expanse to 38 acres. In 2000 Maes sold Launay with its expanded property to David and Marie-Laure MacKee (Baron and Baronne de Monasterevan) who have continued the restoration and conservation efforts.
