= Robert Delannoy =

French flying ace

Robert Joseph Delannoy
- Born: 2 September 1890; Roubaix, France
- Died: Unknown
- Military career
- Allegiance: France
- Rank: Sous lieutenant
- Unit: Escadrille 80
- Awards: Legion d'Honneur, Croix de Guerre

Sous Lieutenant Robert Joseph Delannoy was a French World War I flying ace credited with seven aerial victories.

== Biography ==
Robert Joseph Delannoy was born in Roubaix, France on 2 September 1890. In 1910, he began his mandatory military service as a Dragoon. Upon the start of World War I, he was recalled and posted to a series of artillery regiments. On 29 March 1916, with the rank of Maréchal-des-logis, he was sent for pilot's training. By 18 July 1916, he graduated initial training with Military Pilot's Brevet No. 3962. After advanced training, he was posted to Escadrille 80 on 12 December 1916. From 5 May 1917 through year's end, Delannoy would shoot down five German airplanes. On 5 November 1917, he was commissioned as a Sous lieutenant. On 20 August 1918, he scored a double victory to end his skein at seven victories.
