= Claire Delannoy =

French writer and literary director

Claire Delannoy is a French writer and literary director. She is the Director of a series at Editions Albin Michel where she published Amélie Nothomb, Assia Djebar, and François Cheng. In 2003, she published her first novel, La Guerre, l'Amérique which was awarded the prix Goncourt du premier roman.

== Work ==
- 2003: La Guerre, l'Amérique, Buchet/Chastel ISBN 978-2283019412 — prix Goncourt du premier roman
- 2004: La Conquête de l'Est, Mercure de France ISBN 978-2715225169
- 2005: Lettre à un jeune écrivain (essay), Éditions du Panama ISBN 978-2755700466
- 2008: Remember Me, Éditions Léo Scheer ISBN 978-2756101446
- 2015: Méfiez-vous des femmes exceptionnelles, Albin Michel ISBN 978-2-226-31736-0
