= Rose Delaunay =

French operatic soprano (1857–1937)

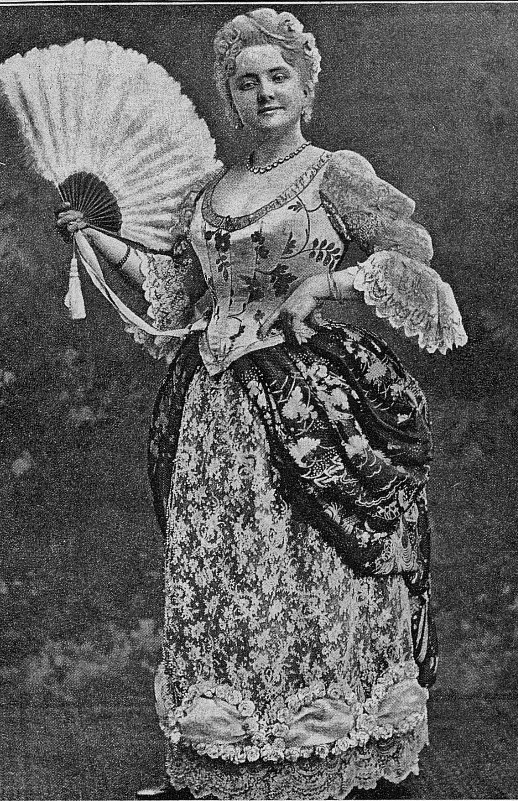
- Delaunay in 1892
- Born: Félice Rose Bünzli; 28 January 1857; Reims, France
- Died: 31 December 1939 (aged 82); Saint-Raphaël, Var, France
- Education: Conservatoire de Paris
- Occupation: Operatic soprano
- Organizations: Opéra-Comique; Grand Théâtre de Bordeaux; Opéra de Monte-Carlo

Félicie Rose Delaunay (née Bünzli; 28 January 1857 – 31 December 1939) was a French operatic soprano. After studying at the Conservatoire de Paris, she made her début in May 1882 at the Opéra-Comique as Isabelle in Ferdinand Hérold's Pré aux clercs. After performing leading roles at the Opéra-Comique until 1886, she appeared in various provincial theatres and travelled as far as Cairo.

== Biography ==
Félicie Rose Bünzli was born on 28 January 1857 in Reims, the daughter of the Swiss-born violinist Auguste Bünzli (1820–1901). She was one of three children. After training with her father, she attended the Conservatoire de Paris. In addition to voice, she studied piano under Félix Le Couppey.

She made her stage debut in 1882 at the Opéra-Comique as Isabella in Ferdinand Hérold's Le pré aux clercs. Over the next four years, her roles there included Anna in Boieldieu's La dame blanche, Javotte in Le roi l'a dit by Delibes, and the title role in Massé's Les noces de Jeannette. In January 1885, she appeared as Micaëla in the 200th presentation of Bizet's Carmen, alongside Célestine Galli-Marié in the title role.

In 1886, she left the Opera-Comique to perform at the Grand Théâtre de Bordeaux and at the Opéra de Monte-Carlo, where she appeared as Coralian in Adolphe Adam's Le toréador. She continued to perform in operas in France's major provincial theatres and even ventured as far as Cairo. Back in Paris, in September 1892, she appeared at the Théâtre de la Gaîté as Serpolette in Robert Planquette's Les Cloches de Corneville.

In April 1937 she celebrated her diamond wedding anniversary with her husband, actor Louis Delaunay (1854–1937). She died on 31 December 1939 in Saint-Raphaël, Var where the couple has settled in 1922.
