= Skunk River Greenbelt =

Coordinates: 42.11°N 93.56°W

The Skunk River Greenbelt is a public/private partnership supporting a 10 mile long trail system between Story City and Ames in central Iowa.

State properties in the Skunk River Greenbelt include Wicks Wildlife Area, E-18 Greenbelt Access, Crooked Bend, Bear Creek, Sopers Mill, McFarland Park, and Peterson Park.

The trail follows the Skunk River beginning just south of Story City and ends at the McFarland Park Complex in northern Ames. There are additional spurs to the main trail originating at the southbound I-35 Rest Stop just south of Story City, Iowa and extensive trails in McFarland Park.

Recreational opportunities include:

- Off-road biking
- Primitive campsites
- Canoeing, kayaking, and tubing along the river portion of the trail
- Public Hunting Areas
- Several Geocache

Wildlife in the area includes:

- Inhabited Beaver Pond near the northern terminus.
- Coyotes
- Wild turkeys
- Deer
- Muskrats
- Otters (rumored)
- Foxes

== Sources ==
- Story County official website
