= Eric DeLony =

American historic preservationist

Eric DeLony (1944–2018) at work in 1985, documenting an 1870 pony truss bridge in Pennsylvania for that state's historic bridge preservation program.

Eric DeLony (1944–2018) served as chief of the Historic American Engineering Record (HAER) from 1971 to 2003 and was a noted historic preservationist. He was a professional engineering and industrial heritage consultant with a particular interest in the preservation of historic bridges. He received the General Tools Award, the highest award of the Society for Industrial Archeology, in 2000.

DeLony graduated from the Ohio State University in 1968.

== Publications ==
- DeLony, Eric (1996). "The Bollman Bridge at Savage, Maryland: Restoring America's Quintessential Metal Truss". APT Bulletin. 27 (1–2): 24–31. doi:10.2307/1504496. JSTOR 1504496.
- DeLony, Eric. "Bridging the Past for the Future". Pennsylvania Heritage (Spring 2000): 8–17.
- DeLony, Eric (July 5, 2009). "The Destruction of Our Historic Metal Bridges Is the Destruction of Our Heritage". Pittsburgh Post-Gazette. Archived from the original on August 23, 2009.
- DeLony, Eric (October 2001). "Documenting Historic Bridges". International Engineering History and Heritage: Improving Bridges to ASCE’s 150th Anniversary. Third National Congress on Civil Engineering History and Heritage. Reston, Virginia: American Society of Civil Engineers. pp. 239–251. ISBN 0-7844-0594-8.
- DeLony, Eric (Fall 1994). "The Golden Age of the Iron Bridge". Invention & Technology. 10 (2). Archived from the original on September 4, 2008.
- DeLony, Eric (1998). "HABS/HAER at the Millennium: Advancing Architectural and Engineering Documentation". APT Bulletin. 29 (3–4): 31–35. doi:10.2307/1504609. JSTOR 1504609.
- DeLony, Eric (November 1993). Landmark American Bridges. Little, Brown and Company. ISBN 978-0-8212-2036-8.
- DeLony, Eric (Summer 2005). "Save Our Span!". Invention & Technology. 21 (1). Archived from the original on September 6, 2008.
- DeLony, Eric (Spring 2000). "Tom Paine's Bridge". Invention & Technology. 15 (4): 38–45. Archived from the original on November 20, 2008.
- DeLony, Eric (2004). "The Value of Old Bridges". APT Bulletin. 35 (4): 3–10. doi:10.2307/4126414. JSTOR 4126414.
