= Thomas Deloney =

English silk-weaver (c.1540 to 1560–c.1600)

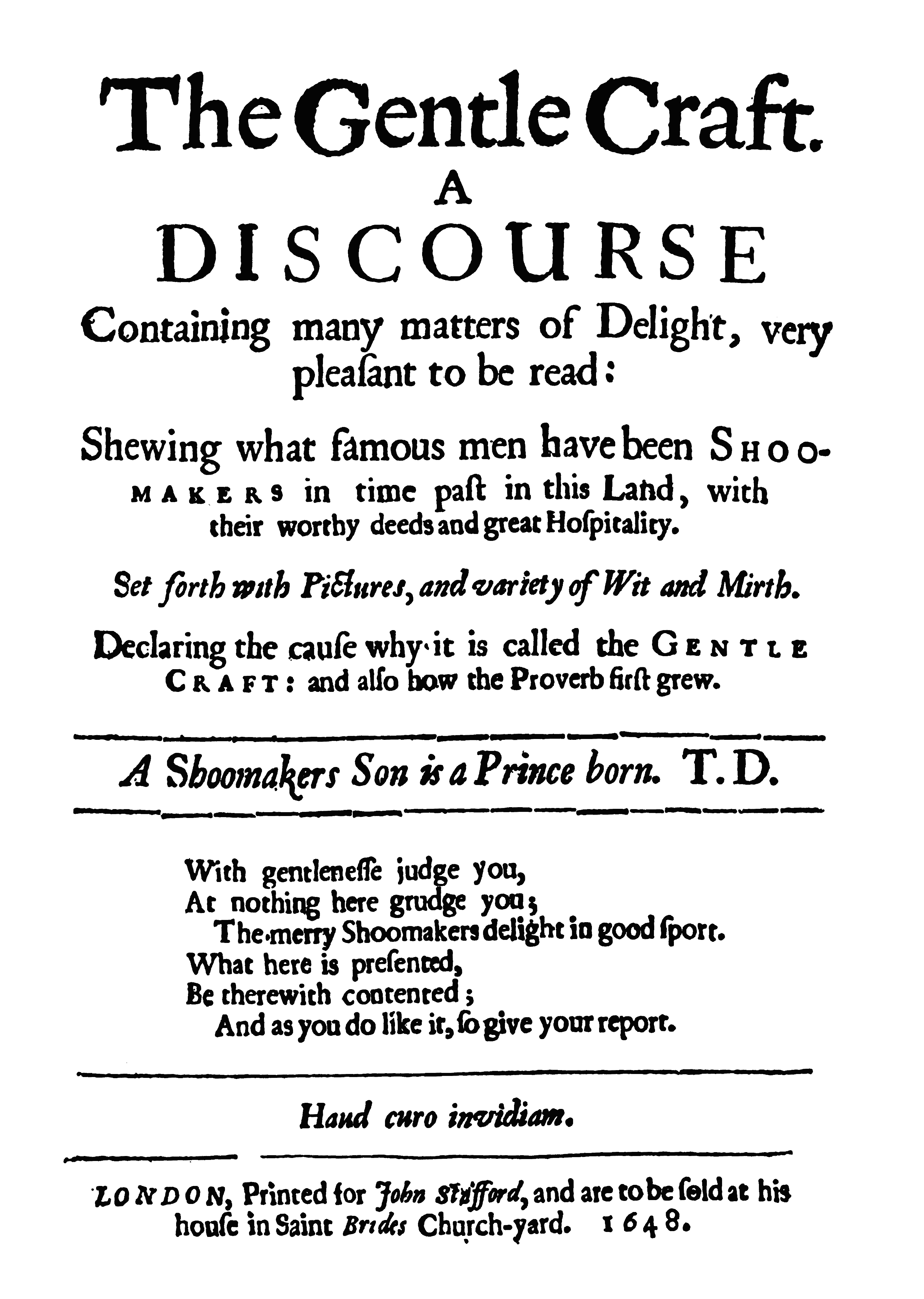
Title page of the 1648 edition of The Gentle Craft

Thomas Deloney (born c. 1540–1560; died in or shortly before 1600) was an English silk-weaver, novelist, and ballad writer.

== Biography ==
Thomas Deloney was born sometime in the middle decades of the 16th century; the precise date is not recorded. Although often claimed to be a native of Norwich, he was most likely born in London, where he was trained as a silk-weaver. French and Walloon immigrants dominated the silk-weaving trade in 16th-century England, and the name Deloney, which looks like an anglicized form of a French name such as De Laune or De Lanoy, suggests that his family may have been relatively recent arrivals in England. An entry in the parish register of St Giles-without-Cripplegate from 16 October 1586 records the baptism of his son Richard, who may have died within a few months.

During the 1580s and 1590s he became well known as a writer of popular printed ballads, many of which circulated as ephemeral broadsides, while others were collected in books and pamphlets. His subject matter, like that of most Elizabethan and Jacobean balladists, was wide-ranging and eclectic, including stories from English history and romance, religious and moral exhortations, social and political commentary, and journalistic reporting of current events. Among his topical poems on news of the day are a description of a fire that devastated the town of Beccles in Suffolk in November 1586; the confession of an adulterous wife in Devonshire who conspired to murder her husband in 1590; two accounts of the arrest and execution of the conspirators in the Babington Plot to overthrow the queen in 1586; and three ballads inspired by the campaign against the Spanish Armada in 1588, including one that describes Elizabeth's visit and address to the troops at Tilbury.

Deloney's writings on social and political issues sometimes created controversy. In 1595 he was briefly imprisoned as a result of his contribution to a letter signed by a group of yeoman weavers petitioning for stricter enforcement of the rules of the London Weavers' Company. And in 1596 a ballad on the scarcity of grain in London was criticized as "scurrilous" and "vain and presumptuous" by the mayor of the city, Stephen Slaney, in part because in it Deloney had the queen engage in a dialogue with her people "in a very fond and undecent sort", which might incite discontent among the poor.

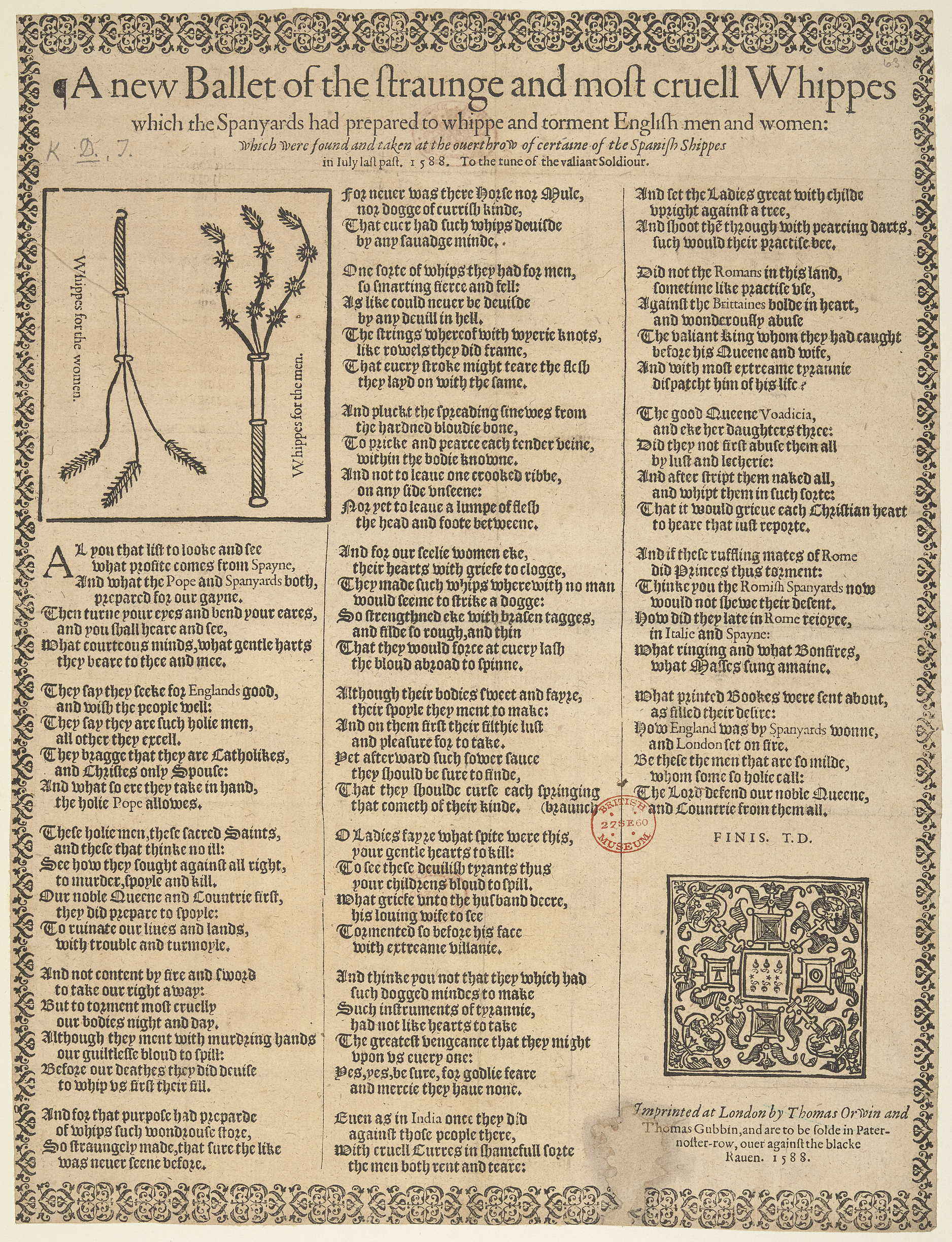
One of Deloney's ballads about the Spanish Armada

In the late 1590s Deloney turned to writing prose narratives, usually called novels in modern sources (although that word was not used by Deloney or his contemporaries). Four novels — Jack of Newbury, the two parts of The Gentle Craft, and Thomas of Reading — were published in the last three or four years of his life (1597–1600), and it is on these works that his modern reputation chiefly depends. They were enormously popular, so much so that the original printings were literally "read to pieces" and they survive today only in later 17th-century editions. Deloney's novels are a mixture of historical romance and social and economic realism, which draw heavily in their choice of subject matter, background, and incidental details on his personal experience as a member of the commercial class of artisans and merchants in Elizabethan London. They are often thought to reflect the character and interests of the growing English "middle class". Jack of Newbury, which is dedicated to the cloth-makers of England, is a fictionalized biography of John Winchcombe (c. 1489−1557), a notable Tudor clothier, while The Gentle Craft, dedicated to his fellow artisans, the shoemakers, is a compilation of tales "showing what famous men have been Shoomakers in time past in this Land, with their worthy deeds and great Hospitality". The popularity of the latter inspired at least two dramatic adaptations of some of its material, Thomas Dekker's play The Shoemaker's Holiday (1599) and William Rowley's A Shoemaker a Gentleman (c. 1608?).

Although Deloney was familiar with the elaborate euphuistic prose of John Lyly and his successors, and was capable of imitating it when he chose to, his style is normally more simple and straightforward. In its directness and vividness it owes something to the compilations of popular tales in contemporary jest books. He makes much greater use of dialogue than other contemporary writers of prose narratives, such as Robert Greene and Thomas Nashe, and shares some dramatic techniques with the Elizabethan playwrights.

Deloney probably died early in 1600, or perhaps late in the previous year. In Nine Daies Wonder, published in April 1600, William Kempe refers to a tune known as "Thomas Deloney's Epitaph", and writes that he (Kempe) had been the subject of "abominable Ballets" written by "the great Ballet-maker, T.D., alias Tho. Deloney." In a mocking address to the other ballad-writers of London, he concludes "I was given since to understand, your late general Tho. dyed poorley, as ye all must do, and was honestly buried, which is much to be doubted of some of you." Nothing else is known of the date or circumstances of his death.

== Selected works ==
=== Verse ===
- The Garland of Good Will, a collection of ballads of various types, many of which circulated earlier in broadside form. Entered in the Stationers' Register on 5 March 1593; survives only in 17th-century editions. Reprinted in Mann 1912, pp. 295–380 from an edition of 1631.
- Strange Histories of Kings, Princes, Dukes, Earles, Lords, Ladies, Knights, and Gentlemen, a collection of ballads on historical topics, based on episodes in Holinshed's Chronicles. Original date of publication unknown; survives only in 17th-century editions. (The later editions include some additional poems not by Deloney.) Reprinted in Mann 1912, pp. 381–416 from an edition of 1602.
- Miscellaneous broadside ballads. Reprinted in Mann 1912, pp. 457–492; facsimiles and transcriptions in the English Broadside Ballad Archive.

=== Prose ===
- The Pleasant Historie of Iohn Winchcombe, in his younger yeares called Iack of Newberie, the famous and worthy Clothier of England. Entered in the Stationers' Register on 7 March 1597; survives only in 17th-century editions. Reprinted from the edition of 1627 in Lawlis 1961, pp. 1–87, from the edition of 1626 in Mann 1912, pp. 1–68, and from the edition of 1633 in Halliwell 1859.
- The Gentle Craft [Part I]. Entered in the Stationers' Register on 19 October 1597; survives only in 17th-century editions. Reprinted from the edition of 1627 in Lawlis 1961, pp. 89–169, and from the edition of 1648 in Mann 1912, pp. 69–136.
- The Gentle Craft: The second Part. Originally published before 1600; survives only in 17th-century editions. Reprinted from the edition of 1639 in Lawlis 1961, pp. 171–264, and in Mann 1912, pp. 137–210.
- Thomas of Reading or the Sixe Worthie Yeomen of the West. Originally published before 1600 and first recorded in Stationers' Register on 19 April 1602; survives only in 17th-century editions. Reprinted from the edition of 1612 in Lawlis 1961, pp. 265–343, from the edition of 1623 in Mann 1912, pp. 211–272, and from the edition of 1632 in Aldrich & Kirtland 1903, pp. 1–178.
