= List of presidents of the United States involved in Scouting =

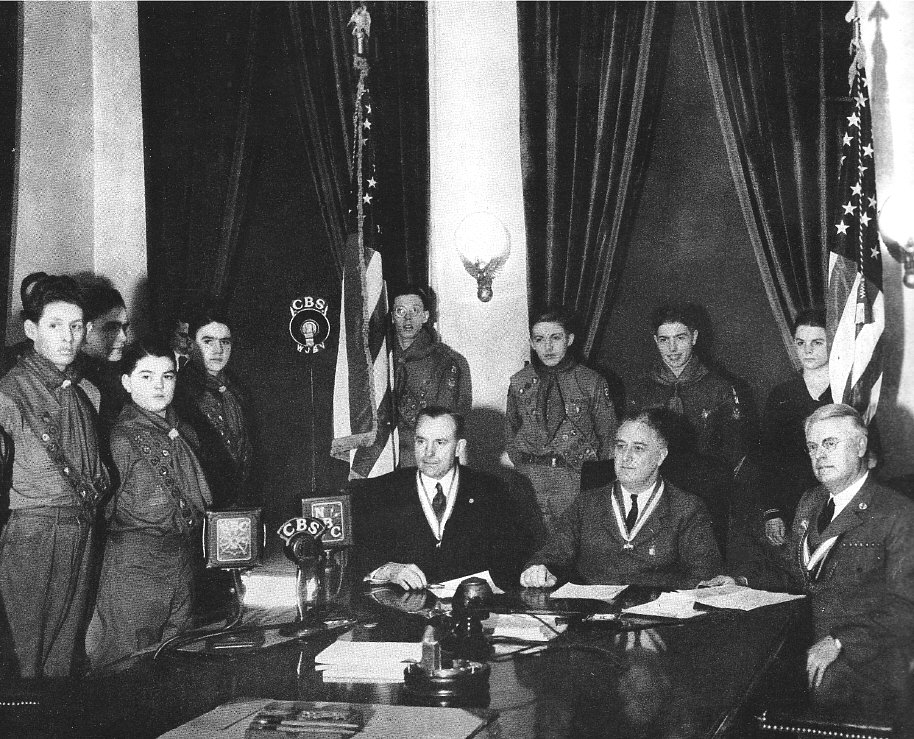
- President Roosevelt in a national radio address for the 1937 national Scout jamboree

In 1911, U.S. President William Howard Taft accepted the position of honorary president (the ceremonial office also called the Honorary Chair, that title written in capitals as a stylistic convention) of the Boy Scouts of America (BSA); each U.S. president since has been offered the position and has served in the role of honorary president. Theodore Roosevelt was the only individual to serve as honorary vice-president, as he had left office as U.S. president before the BSA's office of honorary presidency was established.

Gerald Ford is the only president to have attained the rank of Eagle Scout.

== List of presidents ==
- Theodore Roosevelt was selected as an honorary vice president in 1911 and appointed as the only chief Scout citizen. He served on the troop committee of Troop 39, Oyster Bay, New York and was the first council commissioner of Nassau County Council. For many years after his death in 1919, several thousand Scouts and leaders in the New York area made annual pilgrimages to his grave at the Youngs Memorial Cemetery in Oyster Bay. TR has had two local councils named after him. The Theodore Roosevelt Council, and the Nassau County Council soon renamed to Theodore Roosevelt Council.
- William Howard Taft was the first honorary president of the BSA. At his invitation, the first annual meeting of the BSA was held in the White House in 1911.
- Woodrow Wilson was the first president to have a Scout escort at his inauguration in 1913, a tradition that continues. He signed the bill granting the BSA a congressional charter in 1916 and declared a Boy Scout Week to promote membership and funding.
- Warren G. Harding authorized the "Harding Awards" given in 1923 to troops with membership increases.
- Calvin Coolidge accepted the honorary presidency on August 16, 1923, noting that both of his sons were Scouts. When Calvin Coolidge, Jr. died, Scouts participated in the honor guard and in crowd control. Coolidge presented the first Silver Buffalo Award in 1926.
- Herbert Hoover helped to launch the BSA's 20th anniversary. His wife, Lou Henry Hoover, was national president of the Girl Scouts of the USA from 1922 to 1925 and again in 1935–1937 and the honorary president from 1929 to 1933.
- Franklin D. Roosevelt was president of the Greater New York Councils. He was instrumental in the purchase of Ten Mile River Scout Camp. FDR received the Silver Buffalo Award in a ceremony held at the camp on August 23, 1930. In 1933, he was made an honorary member of the Suanhacky Lodge of the Order of the Arrow
- Harry S. Truman attended the 1950 National Scout Jamboree.
- Dwight D. Eisenhower's son John Eisenhower was a Scout. He became a member of the National Executive Board in 1948— and as president —spoke on the observance of the BSA's 50th anniversary in 1960. He was made an honorary member of the Zit-Kala-Sha Lodge of the Order of the Arrow in 1953. He received the Wohelo Award from the Campfire Girls in 1960.
- John F. Kennedy was the first president who had been a Scout as a youth. He was a member of Troop 2 in Bronxville, New York from 1929 to 1931, attaining the rank of Star Scout. JFK was active in the Boston Council from 1946 to 1955 as district vice chairman, member of the executive board and representative to the National Council.
- Lyndon B. Johnson was a member of the Exploring committee in the Capitol Area Council and a member of the National Capital Area Council from 1959 to 1963. Helped organize Post 1200 in Washington, D.C., which was chartered by the House of Representatives for Congressional page boys. He visited the 1964 National Scout Jamboree.
- Richard Nixon, as vice-president visited and spoke at the 1953 National Scout Jamboree in Irvine, California and at the 1957 National Scout Jamboree in Valley Forge State Park, Pennsylvania. He received the annual report of the BSA on February 5, 1970, launching the BSA's 60th anniversary. Nixon hosted the First National Explorers presidents' Congress in 1971 on the White House lawn.
- Gerald Ford was very involved in the BSA as a youth, attaining the rank of Eagle Scout. He always regarded this as one of his proudest accomplishments, even after attaining the White House. Ford received the Distinguished Eagle Scout Award in May 1970 and the Silver Buffalo Award in 1995. The West Michigan Shores Council was renamed the Gerald R. Ford Council in 1995. About 400 Eagle Scouts were part of Ford's funeral procession, where they formed an honor guard and served as ushers.
- Jimmy Carter was a troop committee chairman, Scoutmaster and Explorer Advisor. After Carter's appeal for energy conservation programs, the BSA held a Scouting Environment Day in 1977 and participated in other conservation programs.
- Ronald Reagan was not a Scout as a youth but was active with the Golden Empire Council when he was governor. He served on the council's advisory board, he chaired Project SOAR (Save Our American Resources) and was the membership roundup chairman. He was awarded the Silver Beaver Award. As a member of the Los Angeles Area Council, he served as Scoutorama chairman and as a sustaining member. Nancy Reagan spoke at the 1985 National Scout Jamboree.
- George H. W. Bush was a Cub Scout. He spoke at the 1989 National Jamboree.
- Bill Clinton was a Cub Scout. He spoke at the 1997 National Scout Jamboree.
- George W. Bush was a Cub Scout. He sent a video message for the 2001 National Scout Jamboree, and spoke in person at the 2005 National Scout Jamboree.
- Barack Obama was a Siaga (Cub Scout) in Gerakan Pramuka Indonesia, the national Scouting organization of Indonesia. He sent a video message for the 2010 National Scout Jamboree.
- Donald Trump was not involved with Scouting as a youth. He spoke at the 2017 National Scout Jamboree.
- Joe Biden was a member of the Explorers program.

== Gallery ==
Presidents

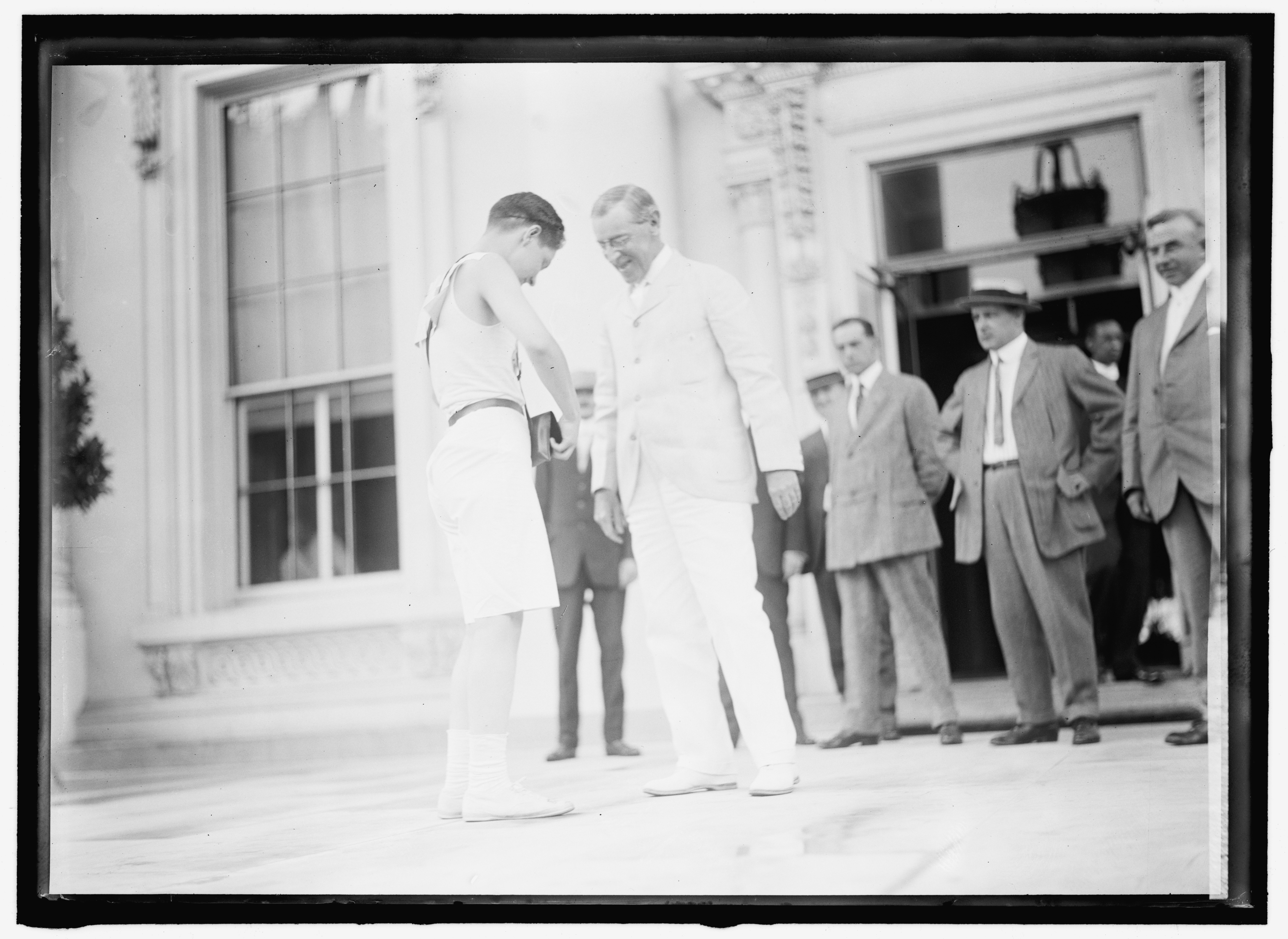
1913 - Woodrow Wilson

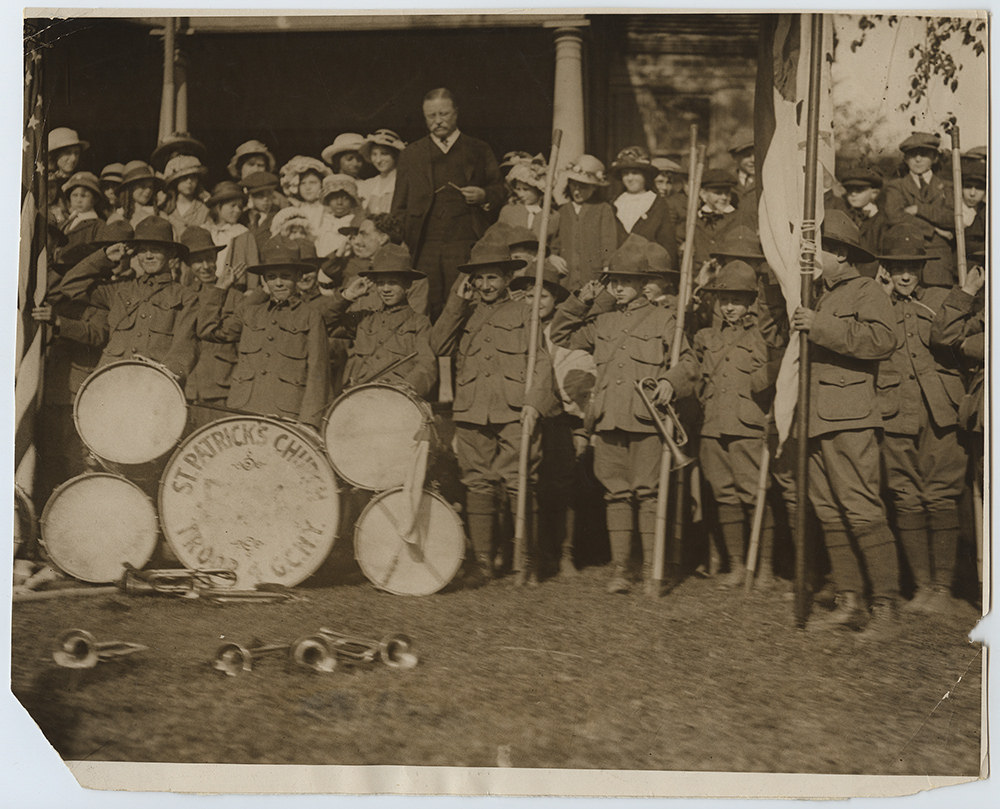
1916 - Theodore Roosevelt

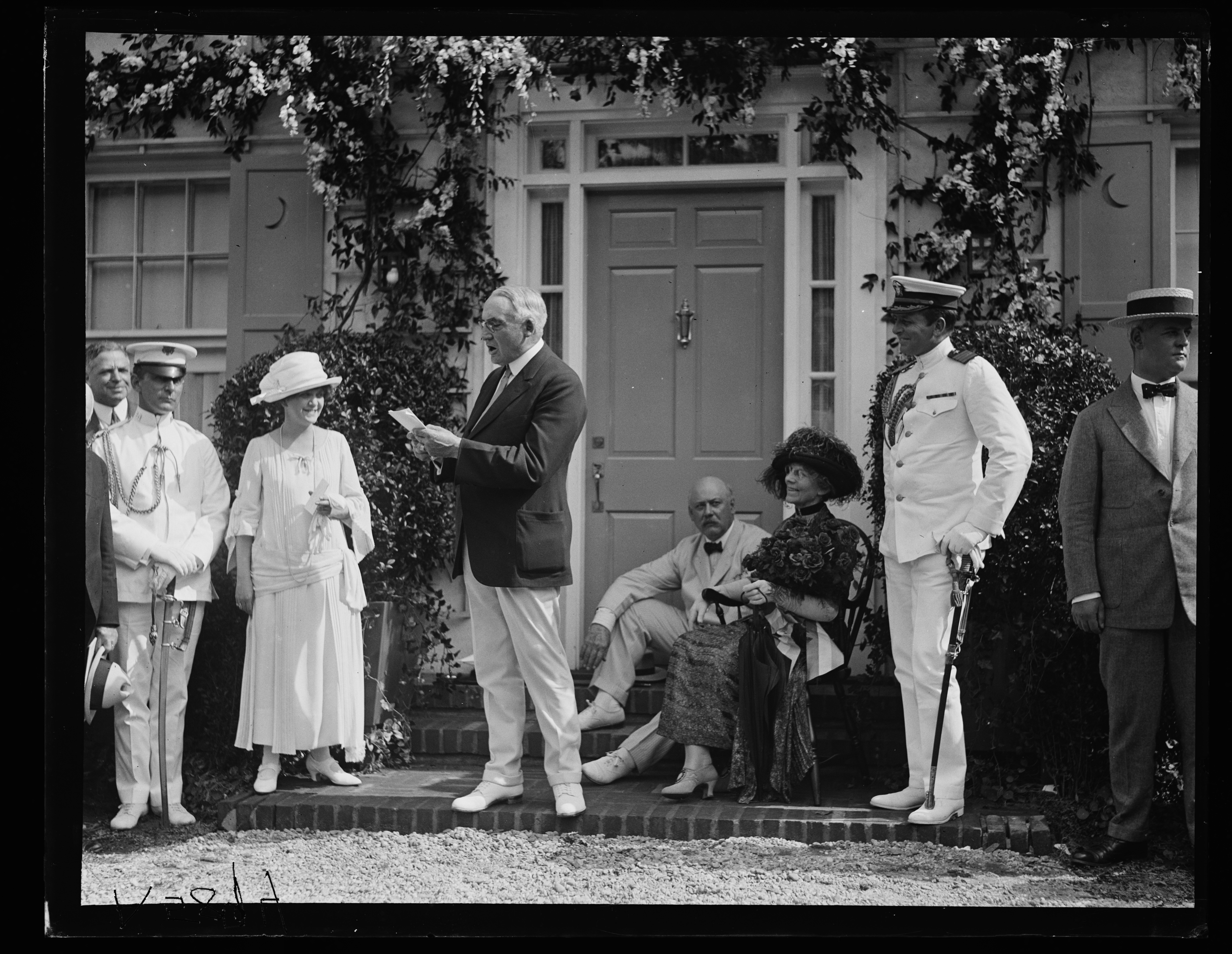
1923 - Warren Harding

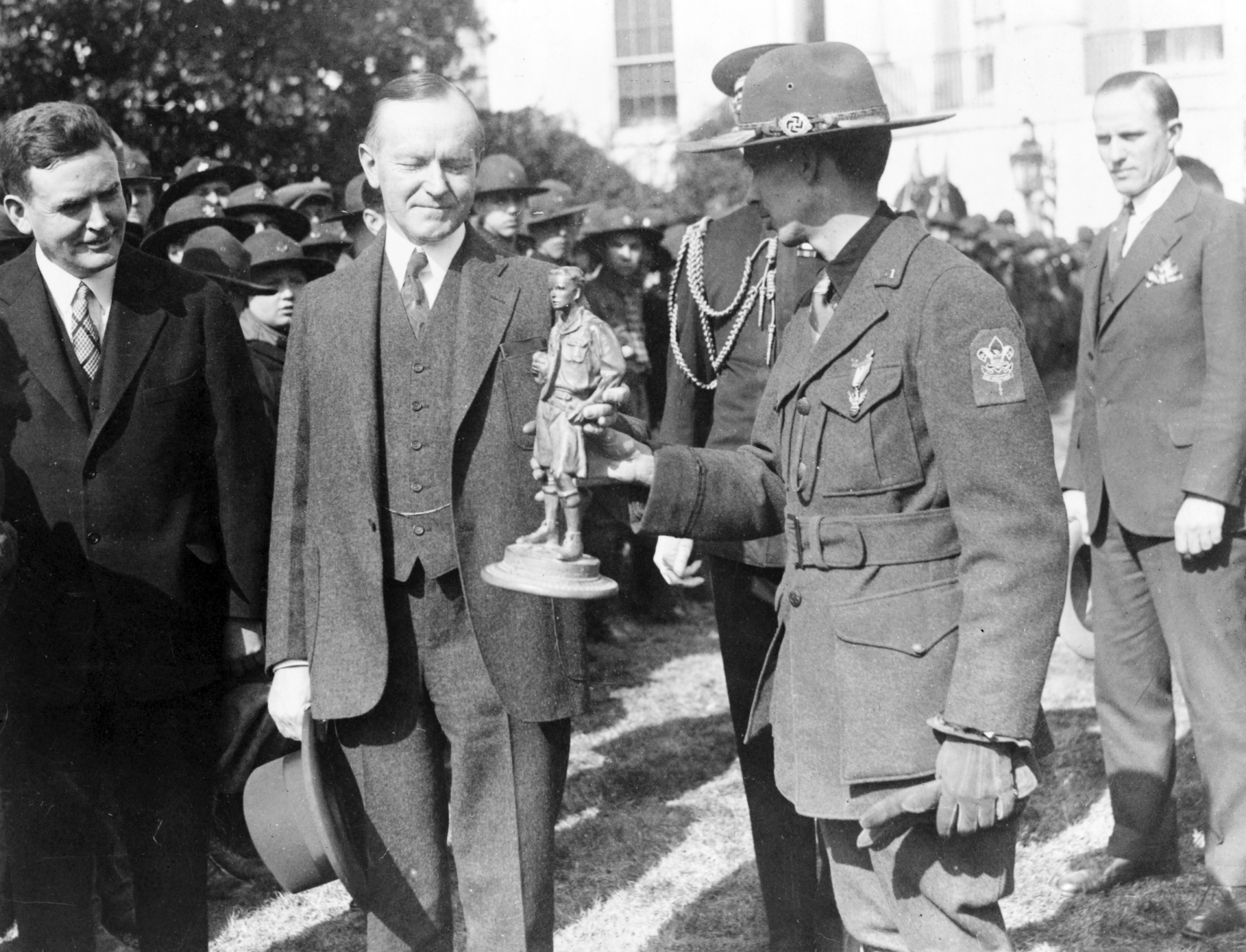
1927 - Calvin Coolidge

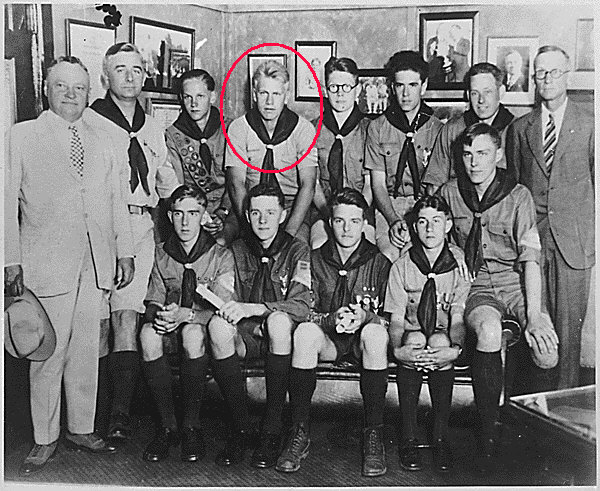
1929 - Gerald Ford

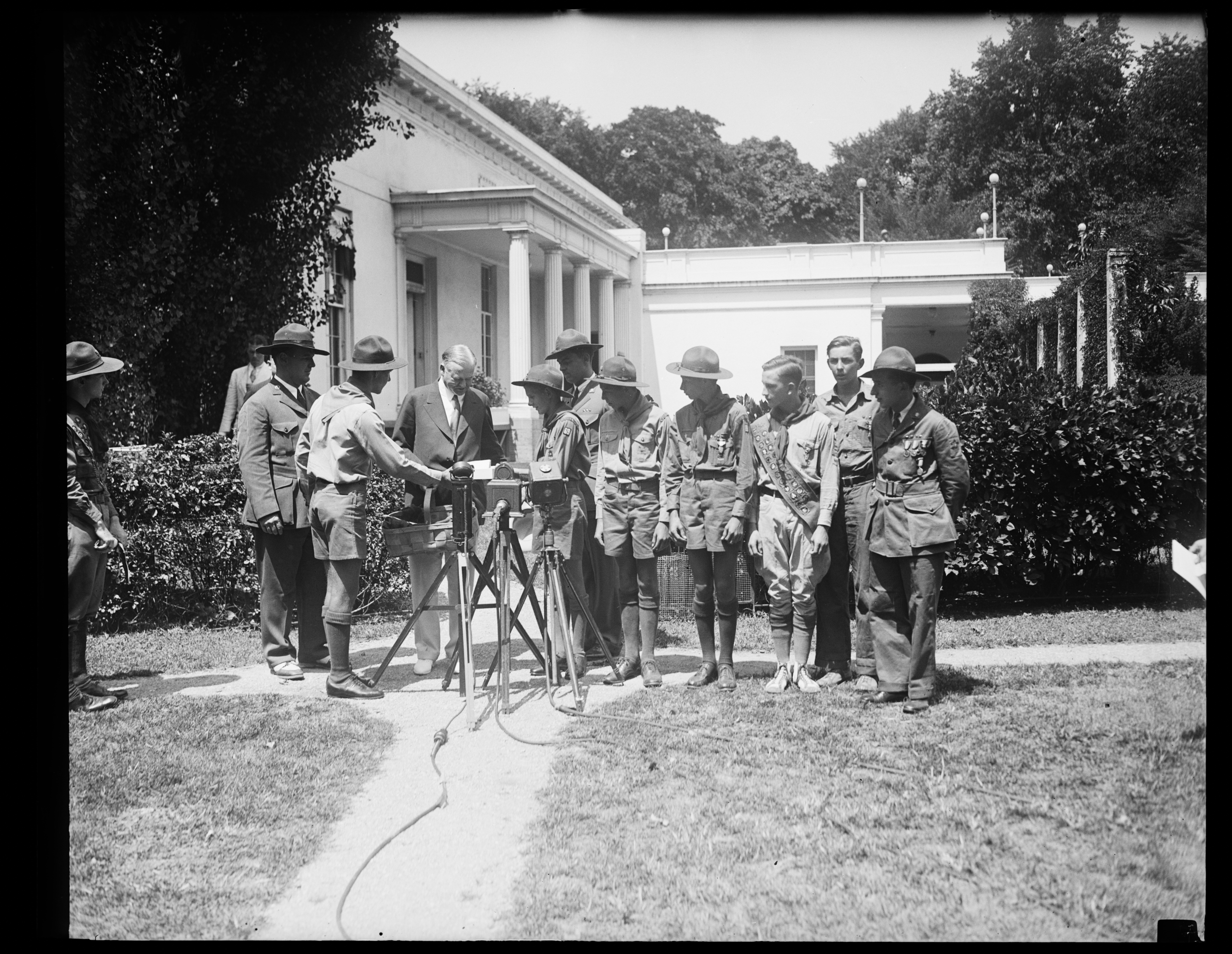
1932 - Herbert Hoover

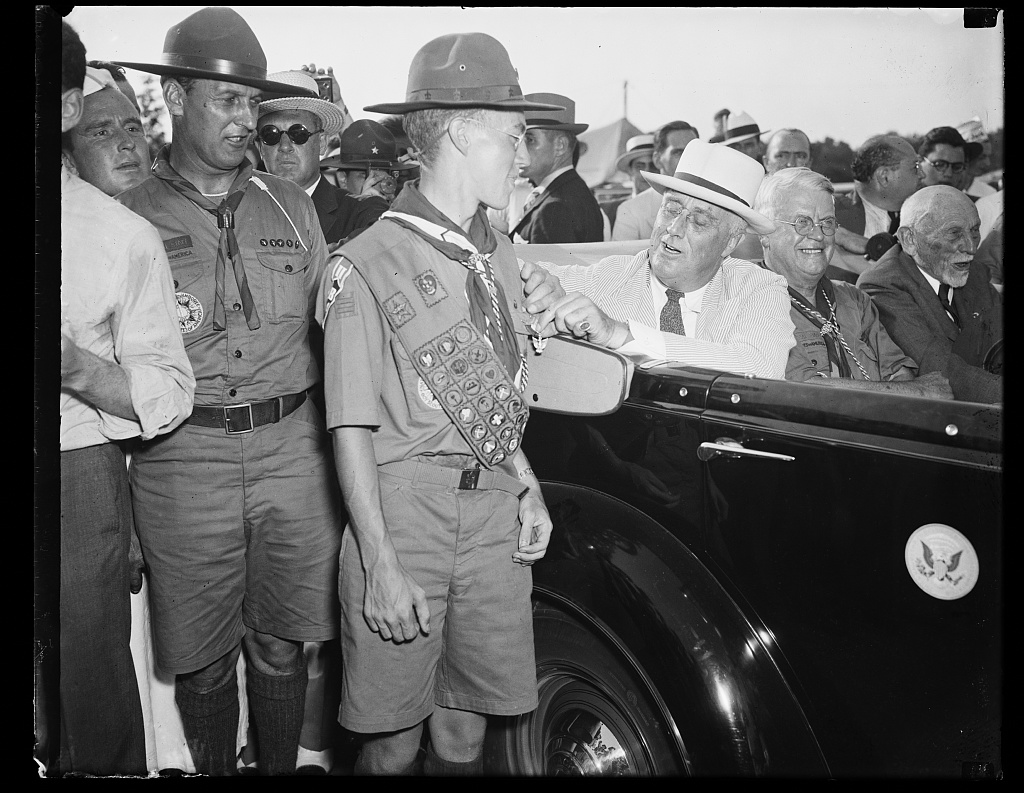
1937 - FDR

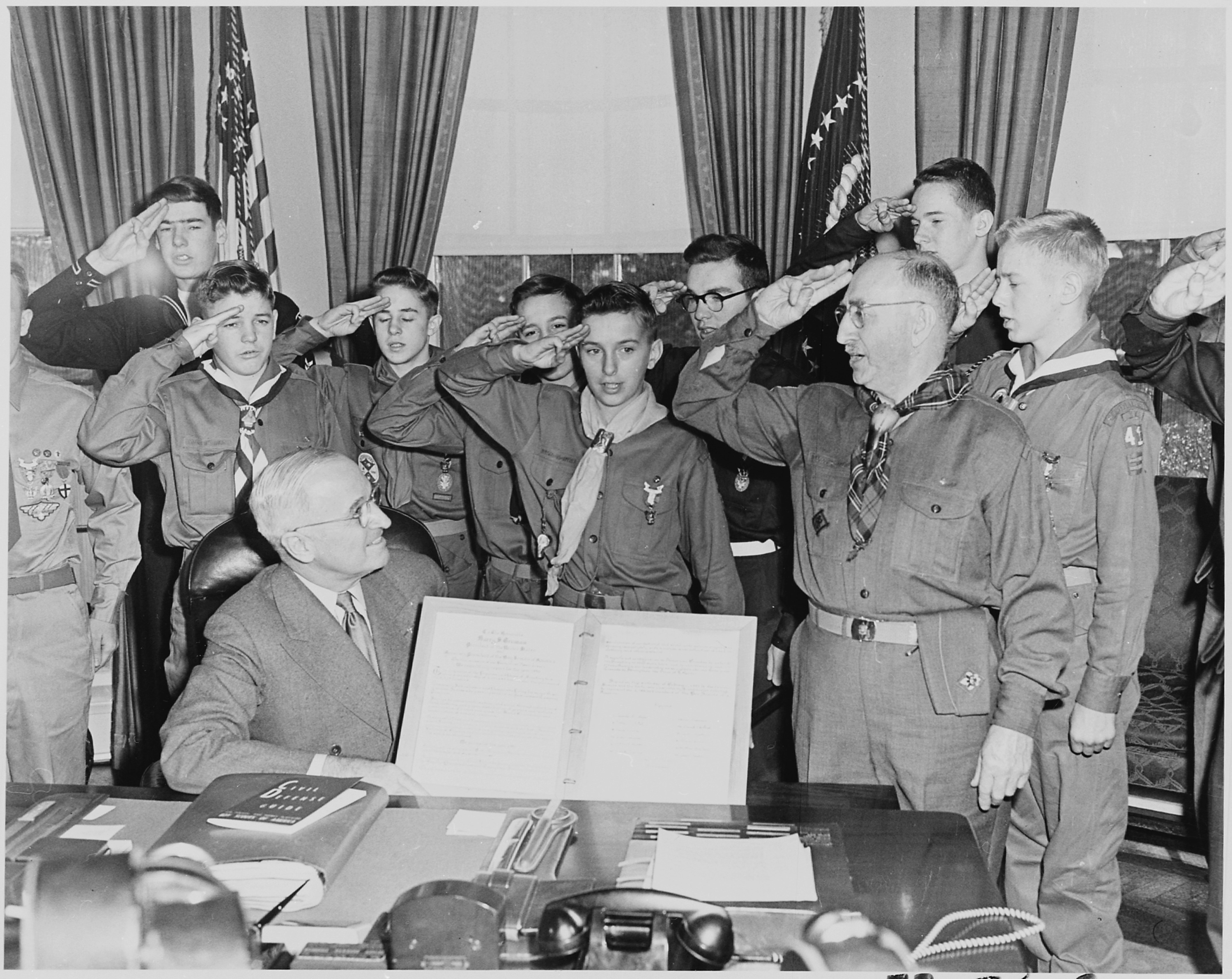
1951 - Harry Truman

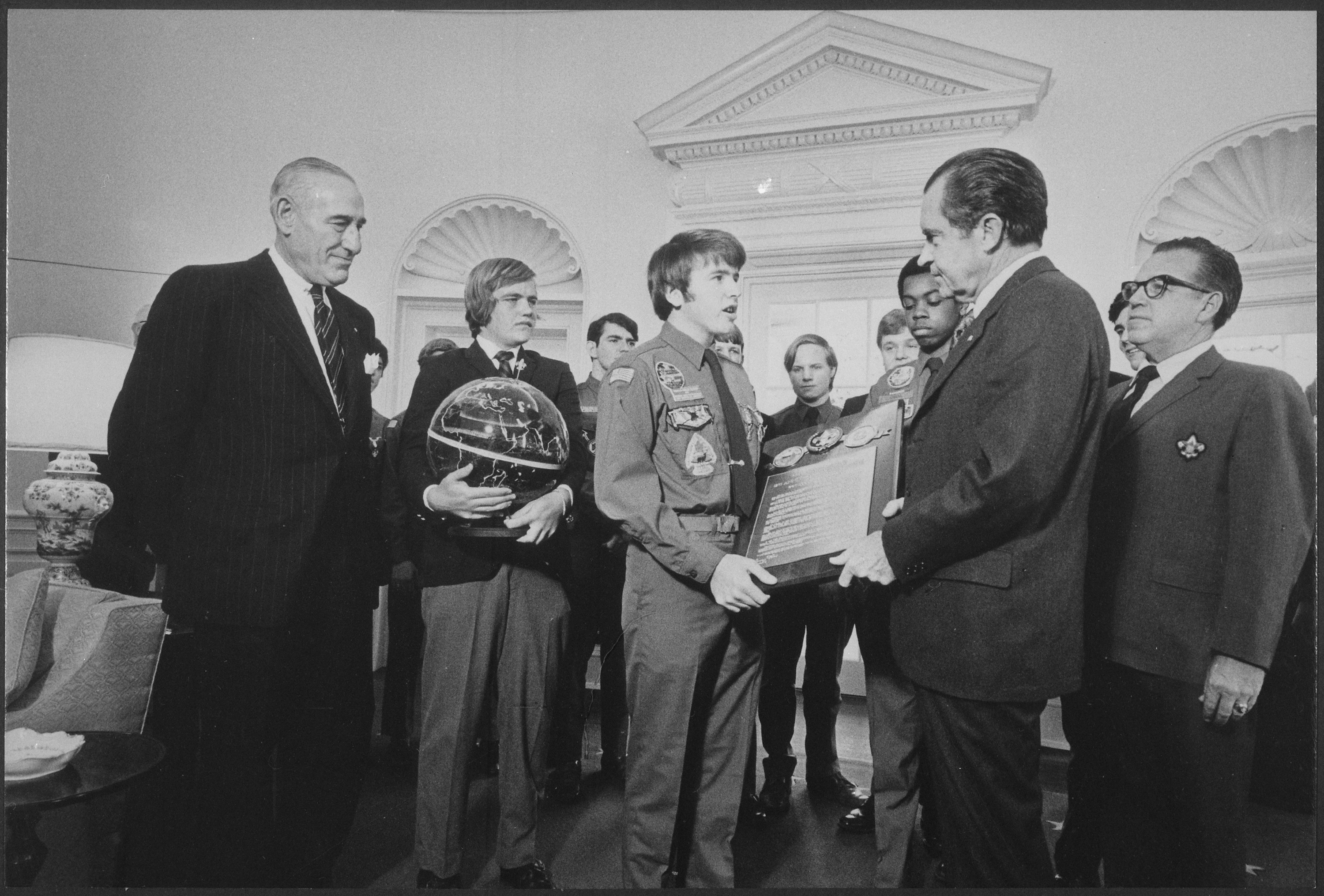
1971 - Richard Nixon

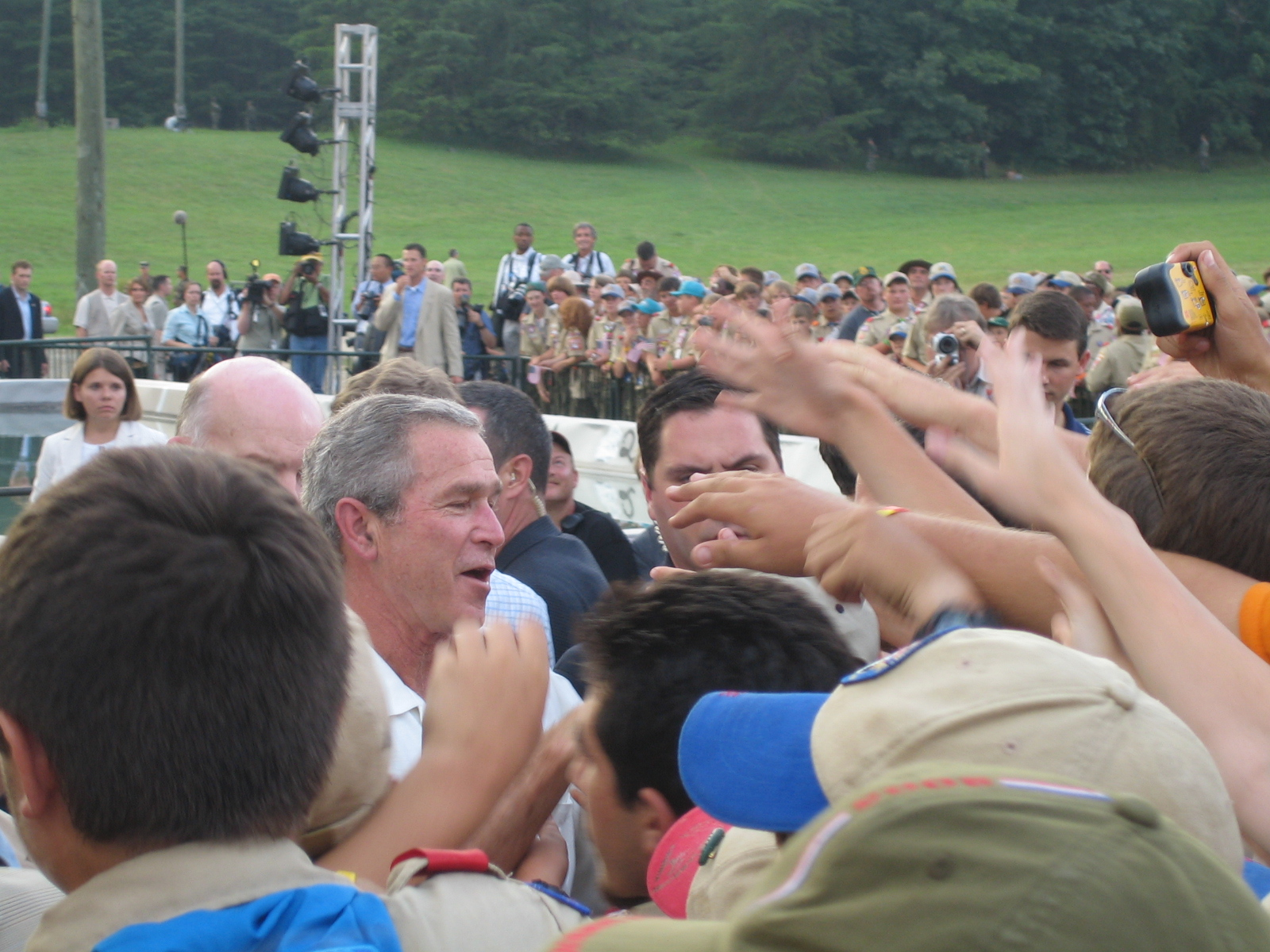
2005 - George W. Bush

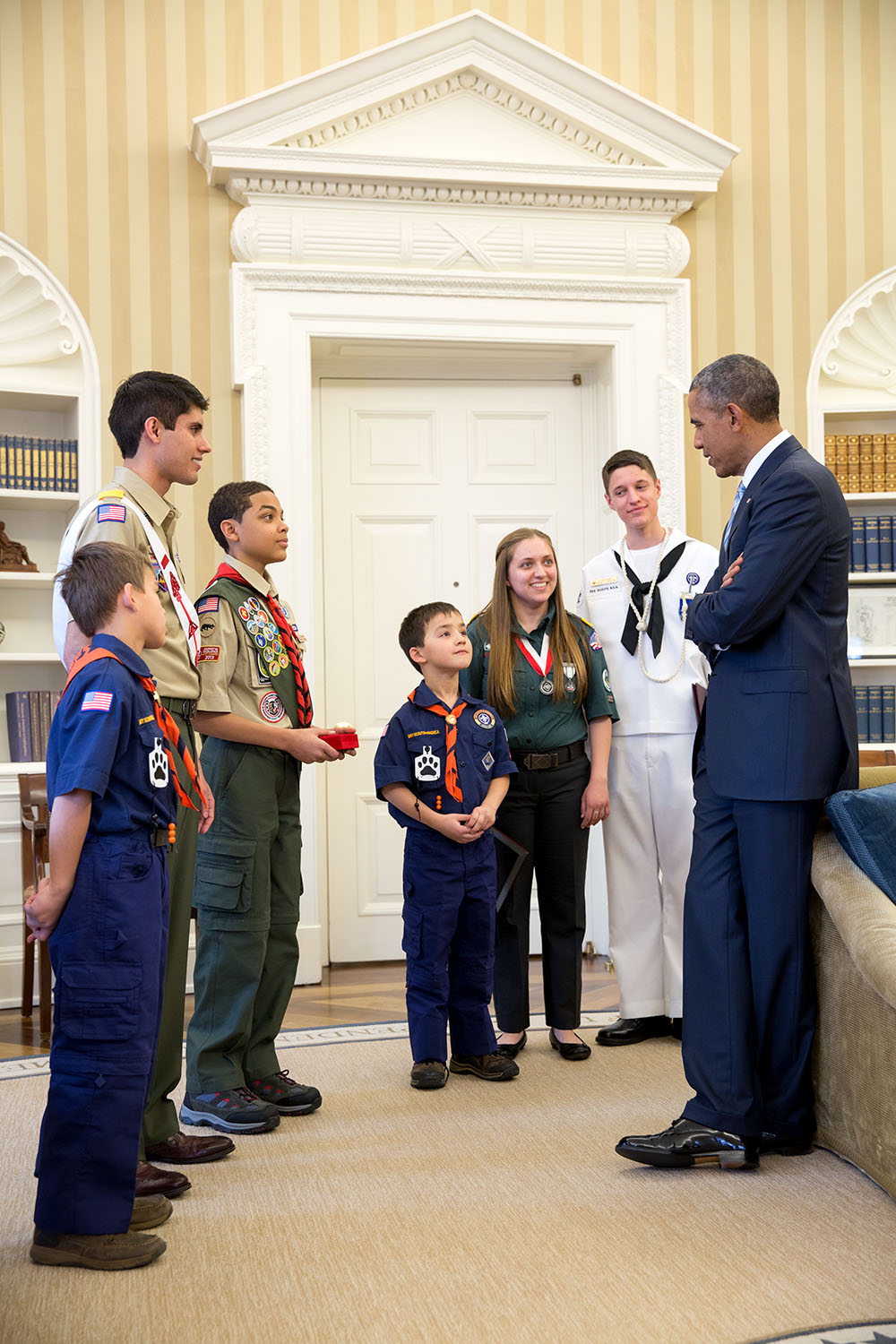
2015 - Barack Obama

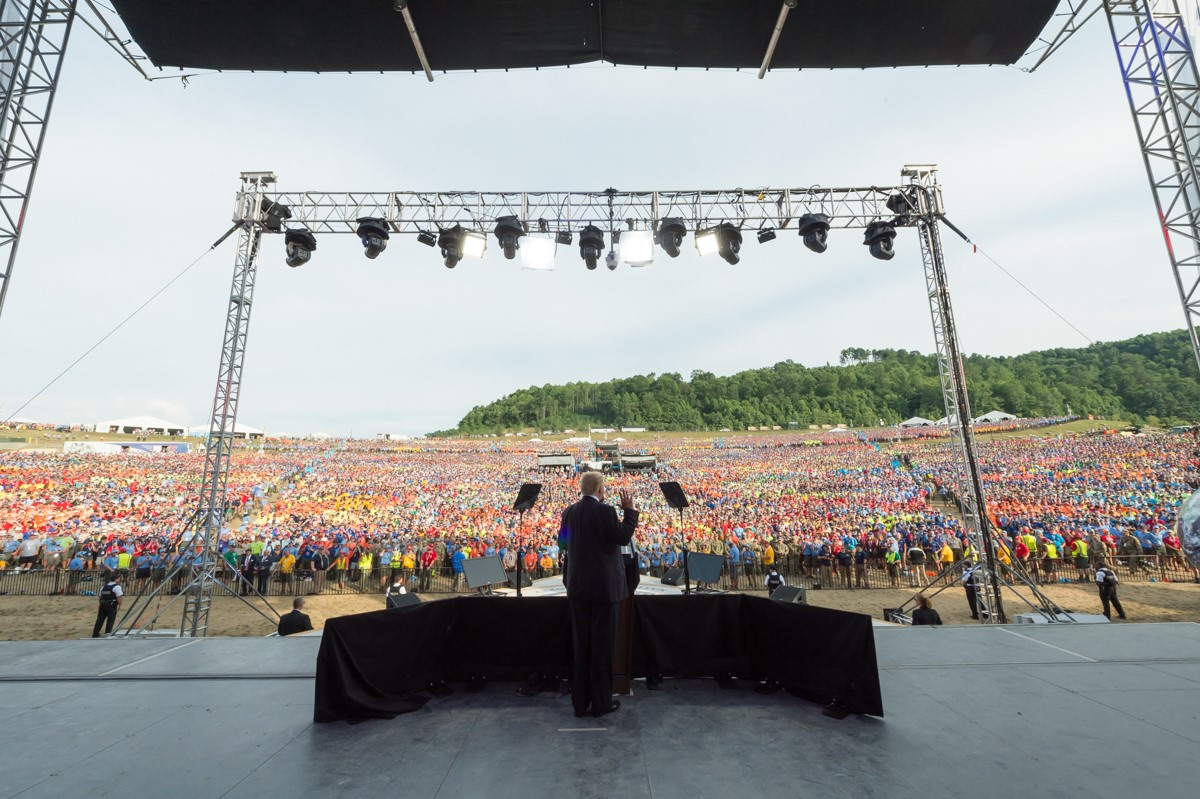
2017 – Donald Trump
First ladies

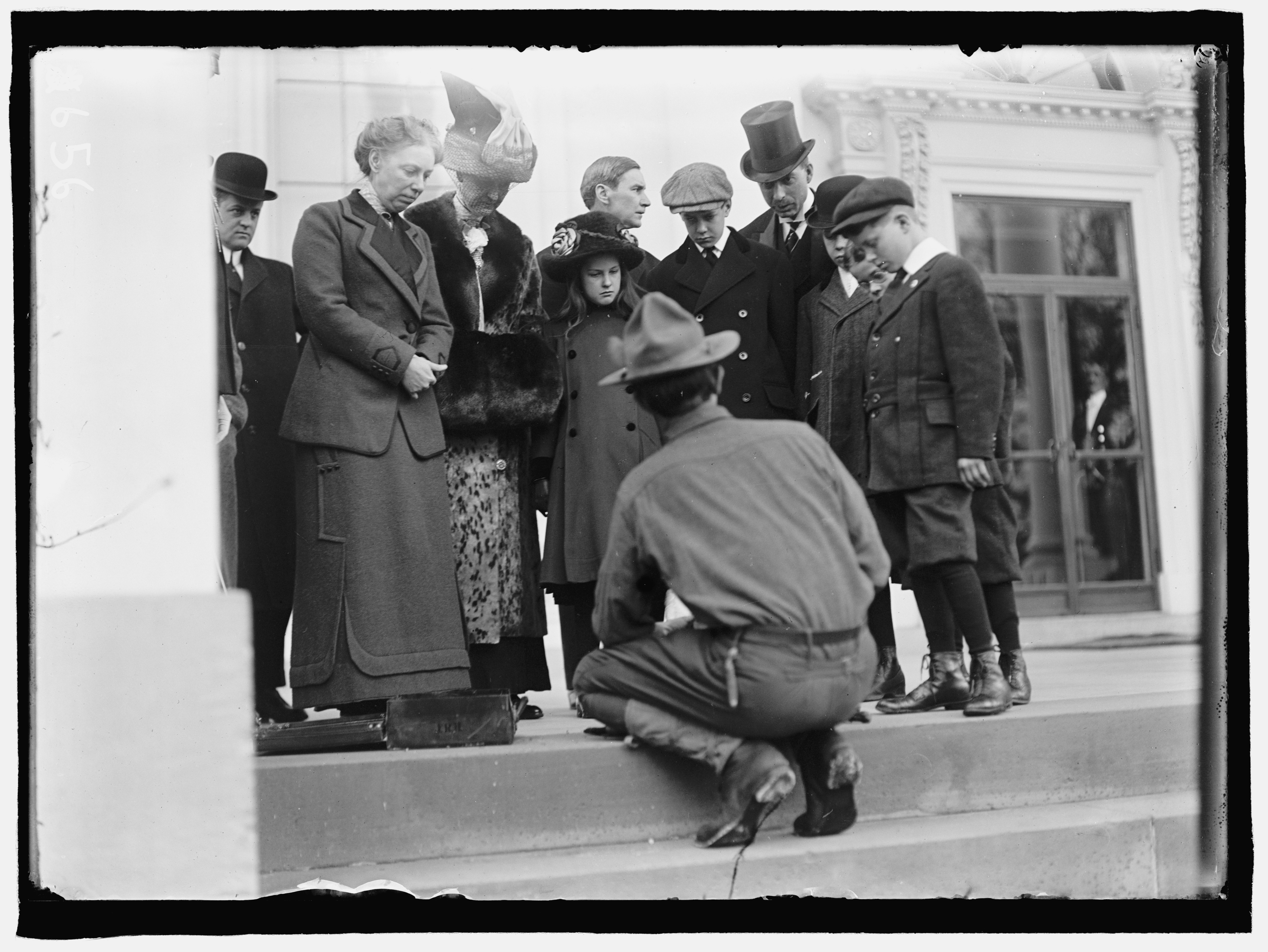
1911- Helen Taft

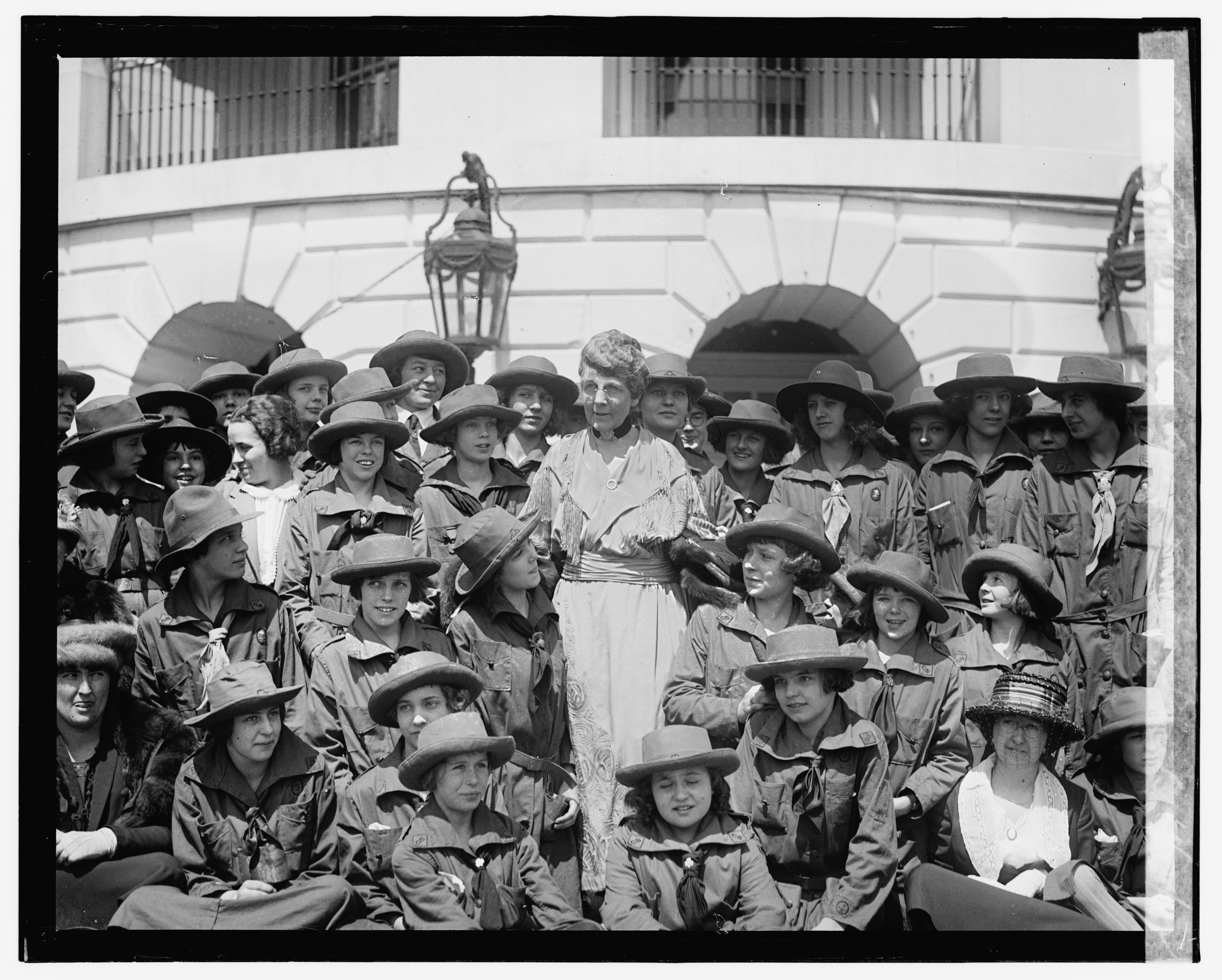
1922 - Florence Harding

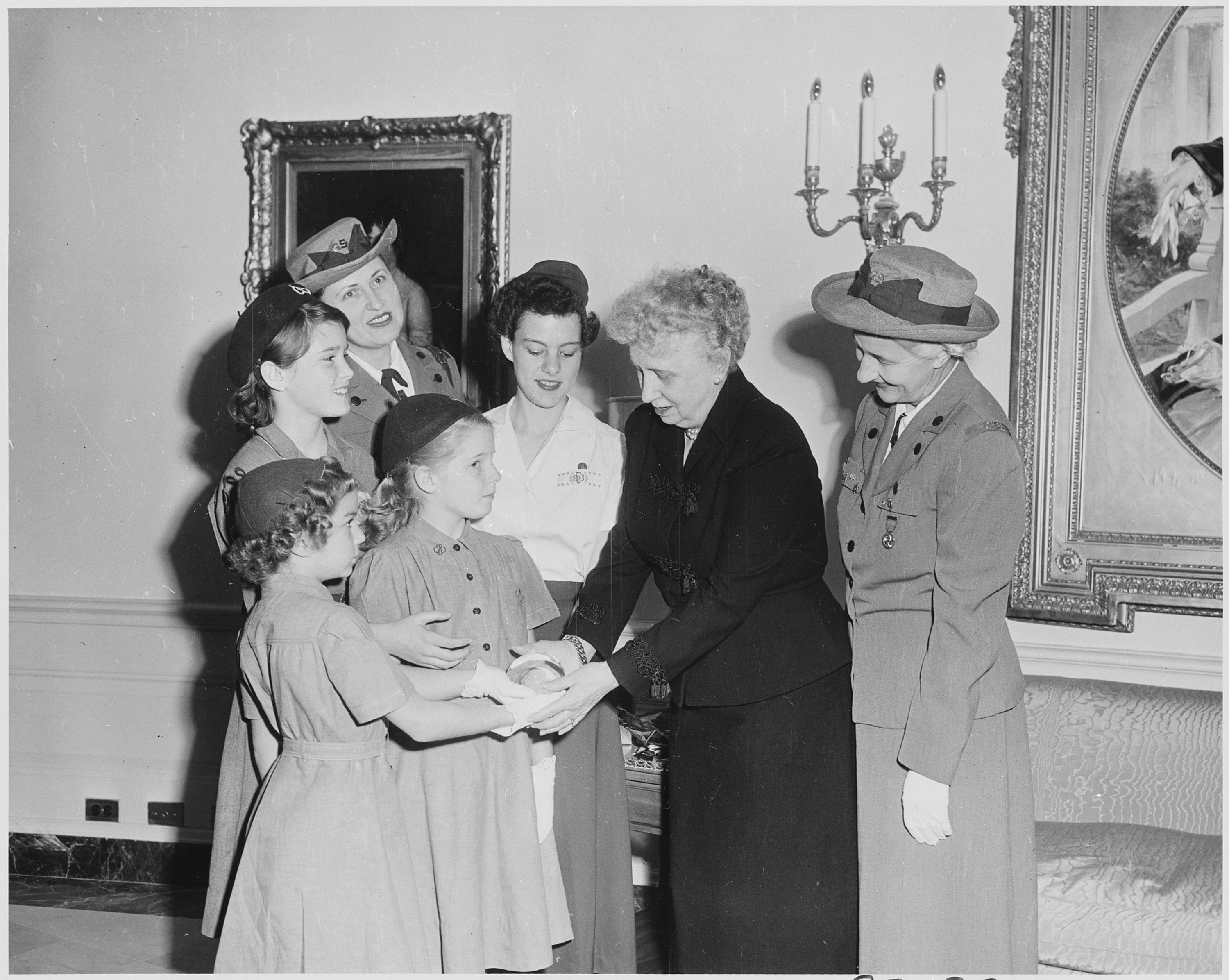
1952 - Bess Truman

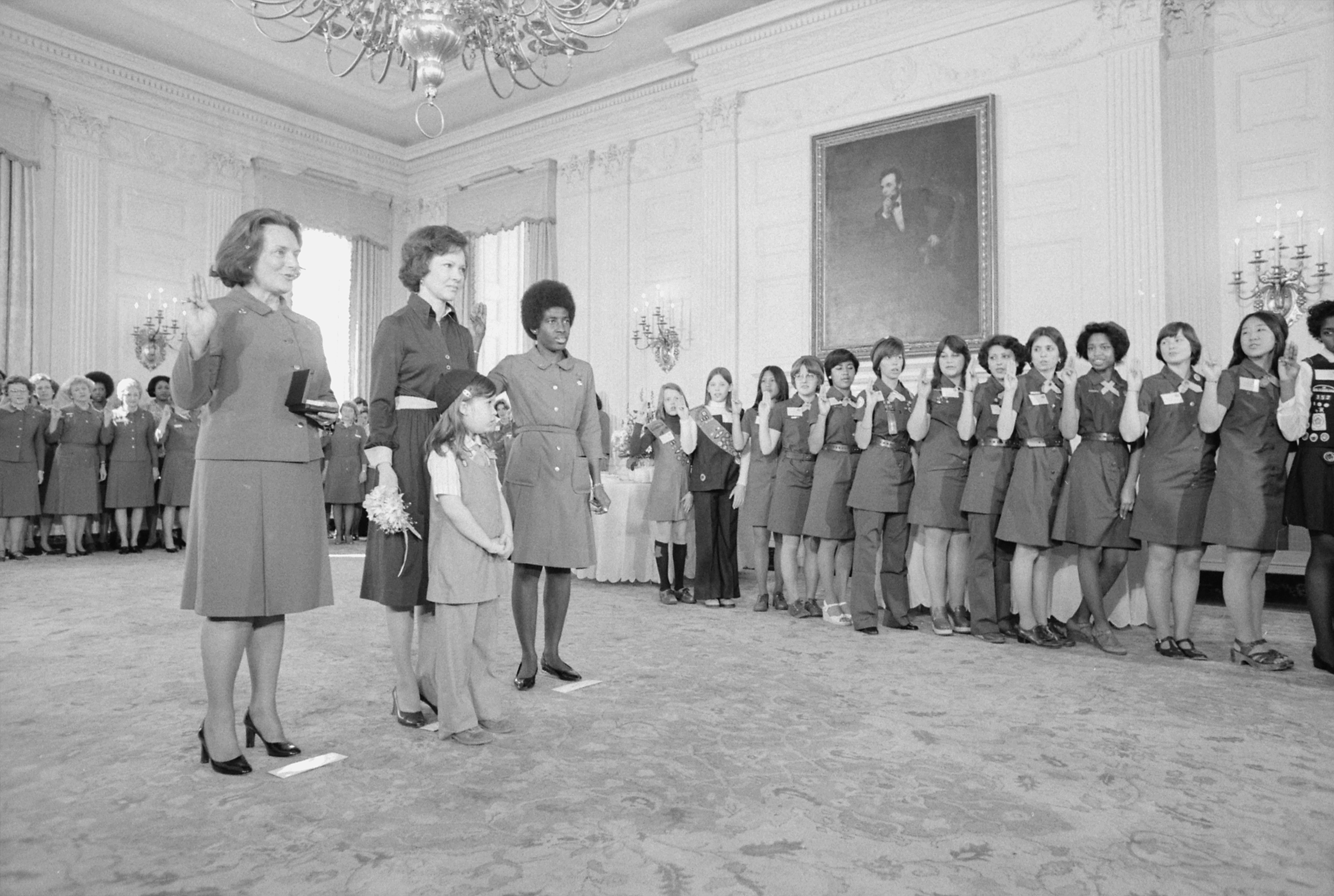
1977 - Rosalynn Carter

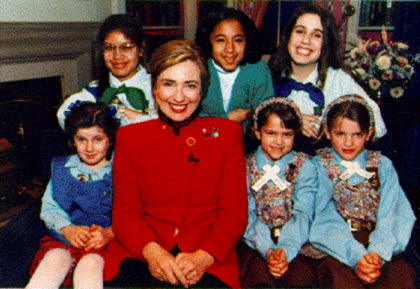
2000 - Hillary Clinton

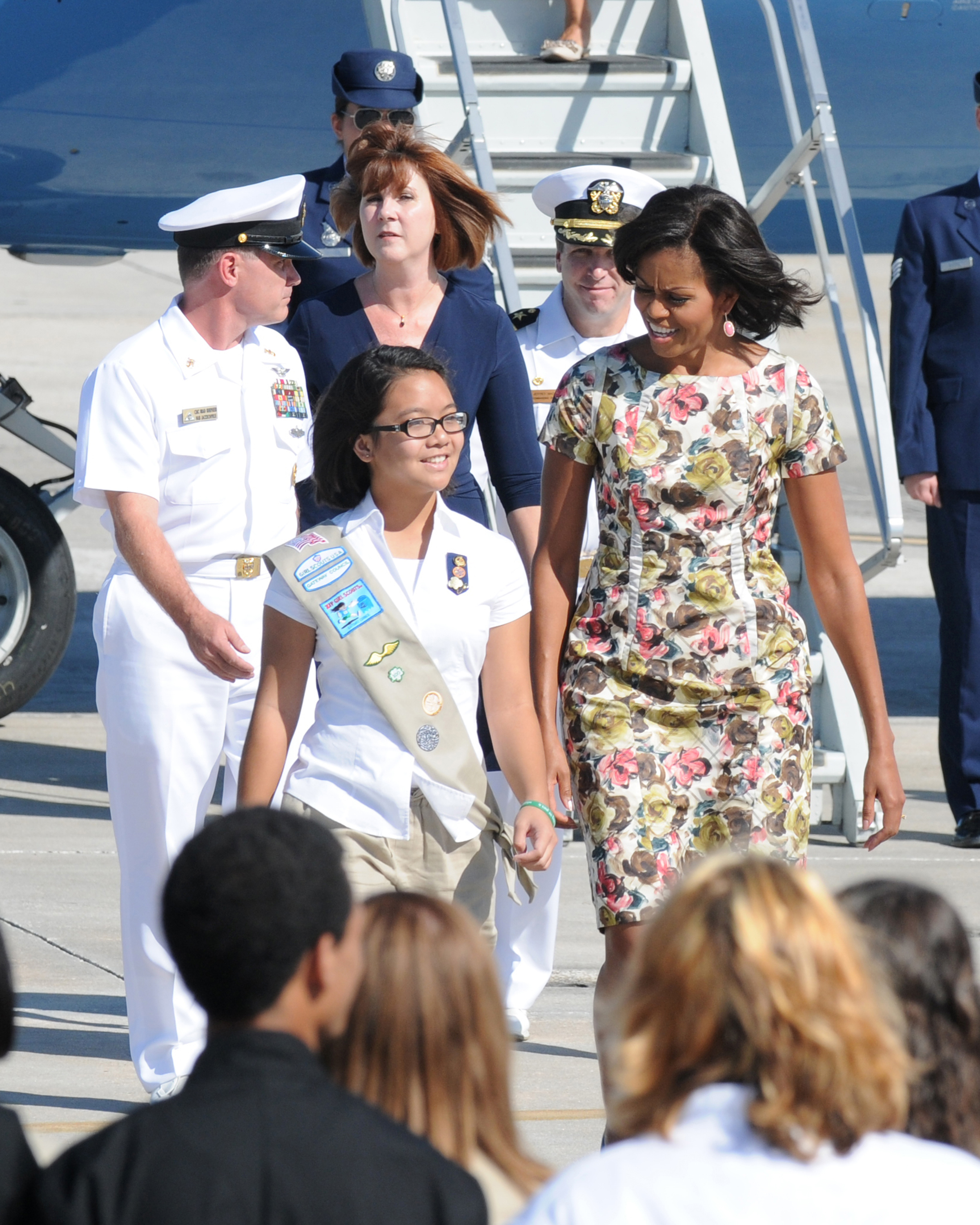
2011 - Michelle Obama
