= 2013 National Scout Jamboree =

Event held by the Boy Scouts of America

2013 National Scout Jamboree (Boy Scouts of America)
- Theme: Go Big. Get Wild.
- Location: Summit Bechtel Reserve, West Virginia
- Country: United States
- Coordinates: 37°55′35″N 81°09′00″W
- Date: July 15, 2013–July 24, 2013
Previous; 2010 National Scout Jamboree	Next; 2017 National Scout Jamboree

The 2013 National Scout Jamboree (United States) was the 18th national Scout jamboree held by the Boy Scouts of America from July 15, 2013, to July 24, 2013. It was the first national Scout jamboree held at the Summit Bechtel Reserve in West Virginia and the first jamboree to include Venturers as participants. Attendance was 40,795 Boy Scouts, Venturers, volunteers and staff.

Compared to previous years, this jamboree operated more like a World Scout Jamboree with subcamps that promoted maximum interaction. It also served as a test at scale of the venue's facilities, since the Summit had been scheduled as the venue of the 24th World Scout Jamboree in 2019.

The 2013 Jamboree was the first in over 30 years to not be held at Fort A.P. Hill, a US Army installation that had hosted every Jamboree since 1981.

== Events ==
There were two shows at the 2013 Jamboree, both occurring at the Summit Center stadium. The first show, which occurred on Tuesday, July 16, 2013, titled "Welcome to West Virginia," was to feature Carly Rae Jepsen, but Jepsen backed out on March 5, 2013, citing the BSA's ban on openly gay and bisexual Scouts at the time. She announced her decision on Twitter saying, "As an artist who believes in equality for all people, I will not be participating in the Boy Scouts of America Jamboree this summer." Teenage recording artist Sarah Centeno as well as country group Taylor Made replaced Jepsen in the show, and were well received.

The second show, which was titled "Celebration of Scouting," occurred on Saturday, July 20, 2013, and featured Mike Rowe as the keynote speaker and rock band 3 Doors Down as the musical act. Originally, the show was to be headlined by pop rock band Train, but the band rescinded its commitment on March 1, 2013, citing the BSA's ban on openly gay and bisexual Scouts. The band said it would have been happy to play the show as long as the BSA "makes the right decision before then," apparently a reference to a potential overturn of the ban. After the BSA decision to allow openly gay Scouts (but not openly gay leaders) was released in May 2013, Train did not make any statement on returning to play at the Jamboree. Instead, the group was replaced by 3 Doors Down, which was announced as the headliner group on social media during the 2013 Jamboree.

King Carl XVI Gustaf of Sweden also made an appearance at one of the shows, giving a speech to attendees at the stadium and speaking individually with a number of scouts.

Another guest visitor was Gill Clay, the first granddaughter of Robert Baden-Powell.

== Advancement ==
New merit badges introduced at the jamboree include Game Design, Programming, and Sustainability. A preview to the Mining in Society merit badge was also offered at the Jamboree.

== New features ==
Apart from the change of venue and time, the 2013 Jamboree introduced several new elements to the Jamboree program.

=== Sustainability ===
The goal of lessening the Jamboree's environmental impact was a prominent theme of the 2013 event, and inspired a number of initiatives in its planning and execution.

Water conservation was in full effect. This Jamboree was the first to ban all one-time use water bottles. The "greywater" methodology was also used: water from sinks and showers was used to flush toilets, leading the Summit to advertise a "zero gallon" water waste. Wastewater was passively treated in lagoons then used to drip irrigate the local forest, bringing water usage in a full cycle.

According to the BSA, almost all the lumber used to build the many onsite shower houses and latrine facilities came directly from forests on the property. Facilities did not require paint or harmful treatment for construction.

Contingent units and staff members were provided with an officially licensed Jamboree duffel bag. All tent and cooking gear were provided onsite by The Summit, eliminating the need for each council to transport a tractor trailer full of unit equipment and thus, reducing the cost and carbon footprint of transportation to and from the event.

=== Technology ===
As part of the "Scouting 2.0" initiative, a large emphasis on technology was made during the Jamboree. For the first time, participants were advised to carry smartphones in order to use the Jamboree's mobile application for iOS and Android. The app was designed to help Scouts, Scouters and staff navigate the area through the ArcGIS Online Platform (developed and supported by Esri), as well as provide personalized daily activity schedules to all its users.

AT&T sponsored a large part of this technology initiative. Cellular towers, many owned by AT&T, and wifi antennas were placed around the site providing mobile coverage for the Jamboree. Solar chargers were also placed in subcamps, allowing participants to keep their devices charged on a daily basis.

Technology Quest was a half day experience that was a part of every participant's assigned weekly schedule. Scouts had a hands-on science and technology experience brought to the jamboree by major corporate, non-profit and educational partners. These included: NASA, National Geographic, Lego, AT&T, Microsoft, the Franklin Institute, Michigan Tech, West Virginia University Forensics, Team SLR from NASCAR, Destination Imagination, Parallax, Inc., National White Collar Crime Center, University of Charleston School of Pharmacy, Fairmont State University, Geocaching.com, Goal Zero, Mountain View Solar, Virginia Bioinformatics Institute and more. Activities included robotics, forensics, chemistry, physics, health care, IT, DNA and biotech, and photography.

== Death ==
An adult staff member from Beavercreek, Ohio collapsed on July 20, 2013, and was transported by ambulance to Plateau Medical Center in Oak Hill where he was pronounced dead after attempts to revive him had failed. The victim, Gene Schulz, was volunteering as a merit badge counselor and a historical reenactor of the Lewis and Clark Expedition. The cause of death was attributed to a heart attack. No other deaths were reported.

== Controversy ==
There were several controversies leading up to and during the event, including exclusion of obese scouts, their longstanding anti-gay policies, and the high cost of the program as a result of issues with the construction of the Summit Bechtel Reserve vastly exceeding its initial budget.
