= 2017 National Scout Jamboree =

19th National Scout Jamboree

- Theme: Live Scouting's Adventure
- Location: Summit Bechtel Reserve, West Virginia
- Country: United States
- Coordinates: 37°55′35″N 81°09′00″W
- Date: July 19, 2017–July 28, 2017
Previous; 2013 National Scout Jamboree	Next; 2023 National Scout Jamboree
- Website; 2017jambo.org

The 2017 National Scout Jamboree was the 19th national Scout jamboree held by the Boy Scouts of America, from July 19, 2017 to July 28, 2017. It was the second National Scout Jamboree held at the Summit Bechtel Reserve in West Virginia. The theme of the jamboree was "Live Scouting's Adventure".

The Summit was also the venue of the 24th World Scout Jamboree in 2019. It was decided at the 2013 National Jamboree that the Summit Bechtel Reserve would be the permanent location of each National Jamboree.

The gold-rimmed patch for staff

== Changes from 2013 ==
After the most recent jamboree in 2013, BSA leadership underwent a feedback process to determine how they could improve on the Summit jamboree experience, and made changes as a result.

=== Communication ===
Seeing communication with staff and participants as one of the program's biggest hurdles, the jamboree leadership consolidated former forms of media, such as Jamboree Today and Leader's Update, into a single organization, known as JamboLink. JamboLink covered mass email communication leading up to and during the event, social media, live video streaming, and all exclusive content created for the jamboree.

Wait times for popular program areas, such as ziplining and mountain biking, was available online as well as in the jamboree app, powered by AT&T in real time. To accommodate a greater need and ability to stay connected, the number of charging stations at the Summit was doubled.

=== Staff experience ===
Some staff members at the 2013 jamboree complained about unpleasant facets of the volunteer experience. In a Reddit AMA, an Order of the Arrow trek guide recalled very long workdays with no break time, very long walks to program locations, and general understaffing. In response, the BSA announced changes to make staffing the jamboree more enjoyable. Eleven bus routes carried staff members around the reserve, stopping at the staff base camp, various program areas, and participant base camps. To address complaints about uncomfortably cold ambient showers, staff members had access to solar-heated showers in their base camp. Staff members received the equivalent of a full day off in their work schedules, and have the ability to visit other program areas on a day-to-day basis.

=== Service expansion ===
During the 2013 jamboree, the first at the Summit, participating contingents were given the opportunity to complete a "Messengers of Peace Day of Service," taking them outside the Summit to one of nine West Virginia counties to work on a community service project. In conjunction with the Citizens Conservation Corps and the Boy Scouts of America, West Virginia Governor Jim Justice announced an expansion of the initiative, titled "West Virginia Arrow to the Summit." Service projects during the Jamboree were expanded to all 55 counties within the state. The initiative was expected to create over 500 projects with an estimated economic impact of $7 million.

=== Food markets ===
The Jamboree switched from a fixed menu to a grocery store concept, which gave troops choices on what to eat. Scouts used a mobile app to download recipes, build shopping lists, and check out of the store.

== Presidential visit ==
Donald Trump's speech at the National Scout Jamboree

On July 24, 2017, President Donald Trump visited the National Jamboree, making him the eighth sitting president to do so. During his speech, though he did address the Boy Scouts and its values, Trump also boasted about his 2016 electoral victory, criticized former U.S. President Barack Obama, former opponent Hillary Clinton, and the media, and he related an anecdote about real estate developer William Levitt, a yacht, and a cocktail party.

Trump's partisan speech marked a sharp break from past tradition; every other president to speak at the Scout Jamboree in its 80 years of existence addressed purely nonpartisan themes, such as citizenship, public service, and civic engagement. Trump's speech was met with criticism that the Jamboree was an inappropriate venue for campaigning. The backlash prompted multiple Scouts from around the country to make statements to various media groups (including BBC and The Washington Post) such as Jarren Cook, a Scout from West Virginia, and David Wolfe Bender, a Scout from Indiana. On July 27, Chief Scout Executive Michael B. Surbaugh released a statement apologizing for politics being "inserted into the Scouting program".

Referring to the speech, Trump stated in a July 25, 2017 interview in The Wall Street Journal that "I got a call from the head of the Boy Scouts saying it was the greatest speech that was ever made to them, and they were very thankful". However, the Scouts stated to the Associated Press on August 2, 2017, that "[they were] unaware of any such call".

== Entertainment ==
Since both planned headline musical acts in 2013, Train and Carly Rae Jepsen, pulled out of their commitments in advance due to public criticism for supporting the BSA, jamboree leadership had elected not to announce its 2017 headliners before they stepped onstage. Saturday's opening "Celebration of Scouting Show" featured rock band X Ambassadors, whose lead singer Sam Harris made pointed comments about the President's upcoming visit. Country musician Jessie Chris, of Disney fame, performed after Trump's speech on Monday, and the Plain White T's played Thursday's closing show.
