= 2010 National Scout Jamboree =

BSA Centennial: Celebrating the Adventure, Continuing the Journey

- Theme: Celebrating the Adventure, Continuing the Journey
- Location: Fort A.P. Hill, Virginia
- Country: United States
- Coordinates: 38°8′N 77°20′W
- Date: July 26, 2010 – August 4, 2010
- Attendance: 43,434
Previous; 2005 National Scout Jamboree	Next; 2013 National Scout Jamboree

The 2010 National Scout Jamboree was the 17th national Scout jamboree of the Boy Scouts of America and was held from July 26 to August 4, 2010, at Fort A.P. Hill, Virginia. The 2010 National Scout Jamboree celebrated the 100th anniversary of the Boy Scouts of America and was the last jamboree held at Fort A.P. Hill. With more than 50,000 in attendance, the 2010 National Scout Jamboree was the largest overall since 1973, and the largest at a single location since 1964. All subsequent jamborees have been held permanently at The Summit Bechtel Family National Scout Reserve, the Boy Scouts of America's fourth High Adventure base. This was also the first jamboree to include Venturing programs.

== Subcamps ==
The jamboree was divided into 21 subcamps with each subcamp named after a person, place, or animal that best represented the geographic area the councils in that subcamp came from. For example, subcamp 9 was named after the mountain elk.

The Northeast Region occupied subcamps 1–5, the Western Region occupied subcamps 6–9, the Central Region occupied subcamps 10–14, and the Southern Region occupied subcamps 15–21.

=== Northeast ===
1. Camp Freedom
2. Camp Liberty
3. Camp Niagara
4. Camp Keystone
5. Rough Riders

=== Western ===
6. Great Basin Buffalo
7. Pacific Northwest Moose
8. Sierra Ram
9. Mountain Elk

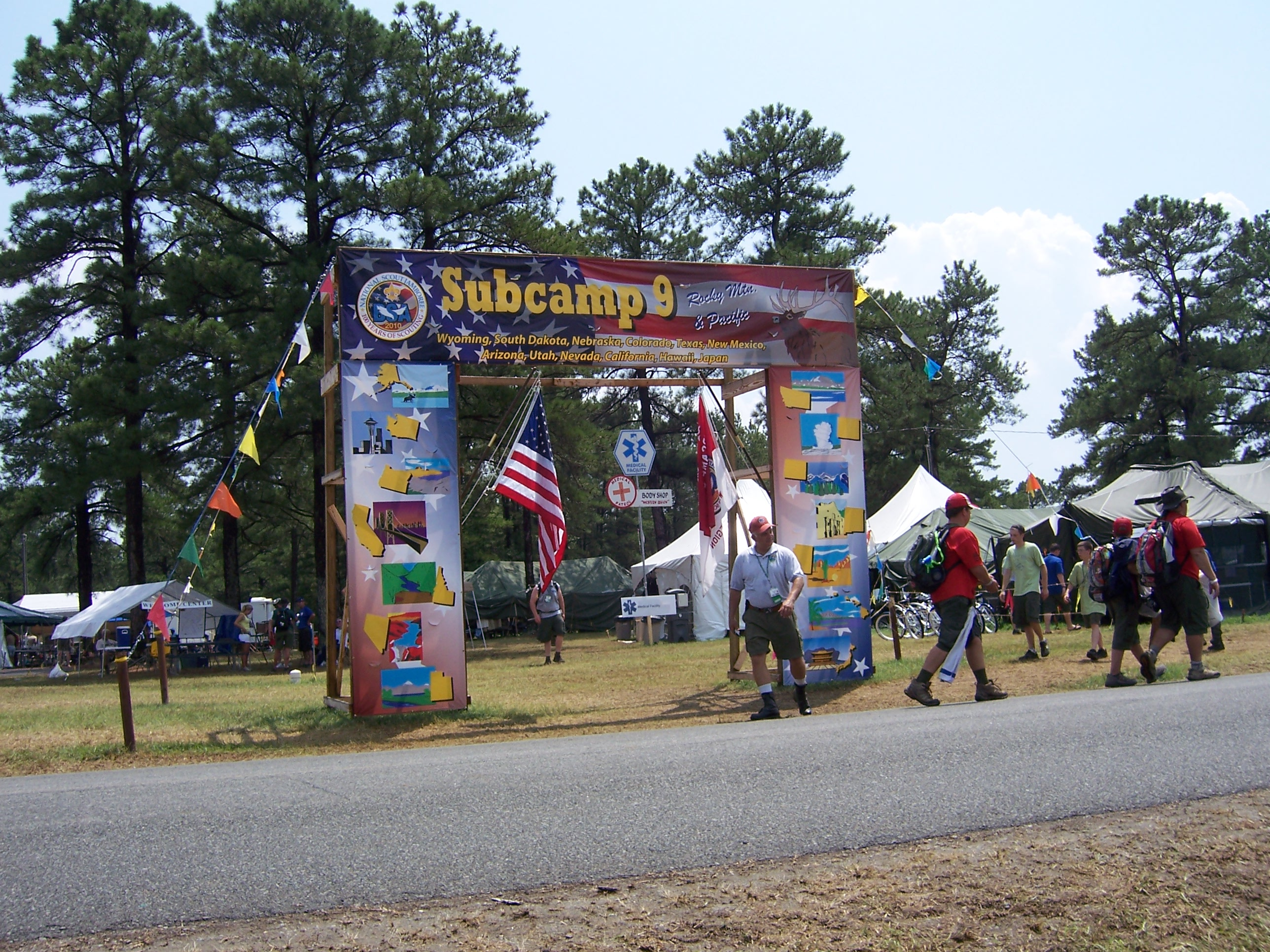
Subcamp Nine

=== Central ===
10. Honest Abe
11. Lewis and Clark
12. Popcorn
13. Wright Brothers
14. Heartland

=== Southern ===
15. Gulf Coast
16. Lone Star
17. Colonial
18. The Mountainmen
19. Pit Crew
20. Flight Crew
21. Rough Necks

== Activities ==
Many activities were available for the Scouts to visit, each giving out stamps for the participant handbooks (aside from the Mysterium Compass, for which Scouts earned a rocker patch).

=== Action Center Activities ===
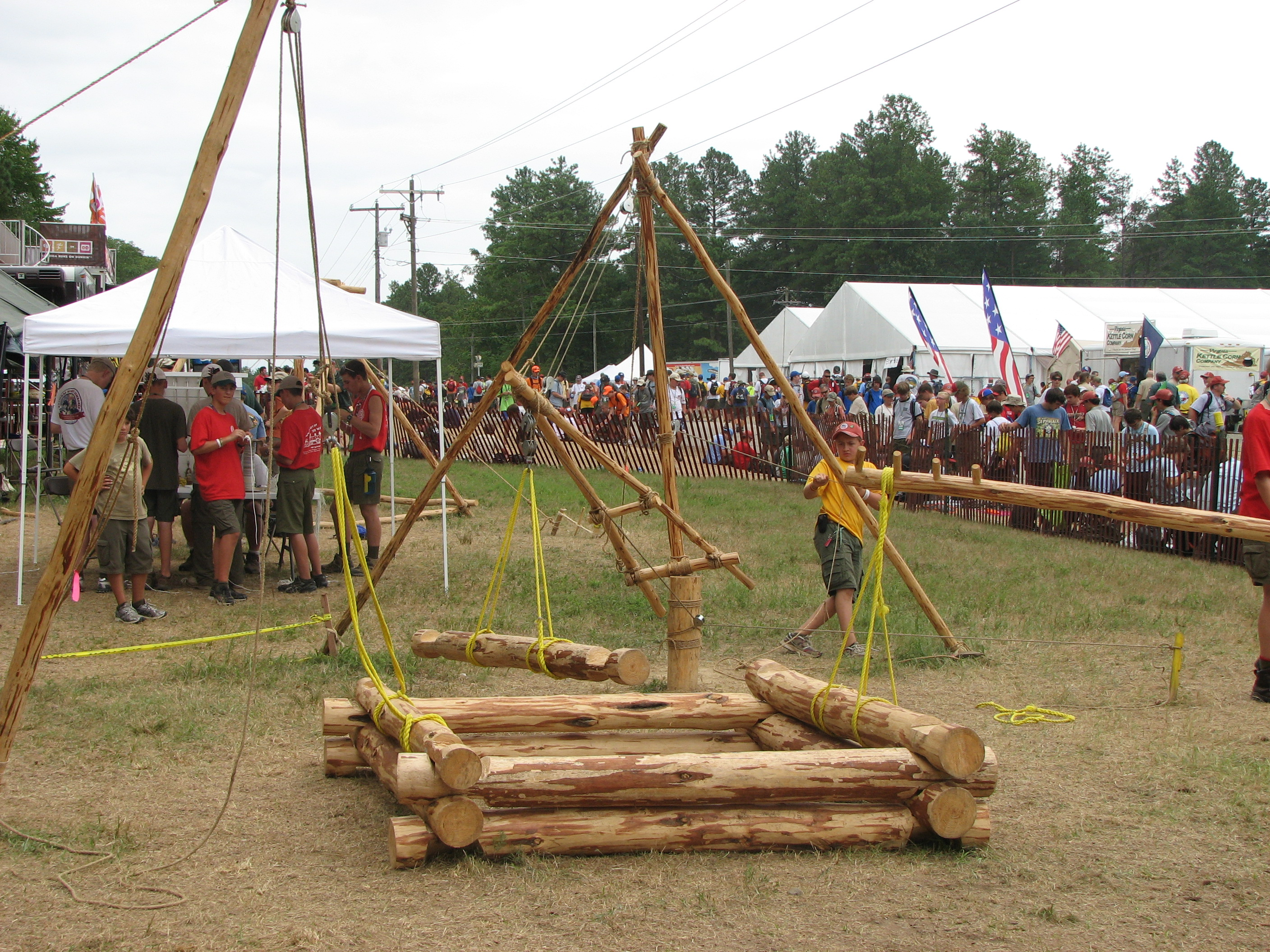
A pioneering project on display

There were four action centers around the camp, one for each region. Each action center had the same activities as all the others, though some things were done slightly differently at each one. For example, the rappelling tower at Action Center "C" included a "helicopter rappel" where participants descended from a rope in free space, instead of climbing down in front of a wall as usual. Each of the activities (except bouldering, which was an optional component of rappelling) awarded a stamp for successful completion.

- Action Alley, an obstacle course designed for teams.
- Air-Rifle Shooting, a ten-foot .22 rifle range.
- Archery.
- Buckskin Games, 19th century frontiersman activities.
- Bikathlon, similar to a biathlon except with bicycles replacing skis.
- Camp Thunder, a challenging skeet shooting range.
- Climbing.
- Confidence Course, equivalent to a Low-COPE facility.
- Motocross, a BMX course.
- Mountain Boarding.
- Pioneering, in which complex projects were exhibited.
- Rapelling Tower.
- Trapshooting, a one-station clay pigeon shotgun range.

=== Outback Centers ===
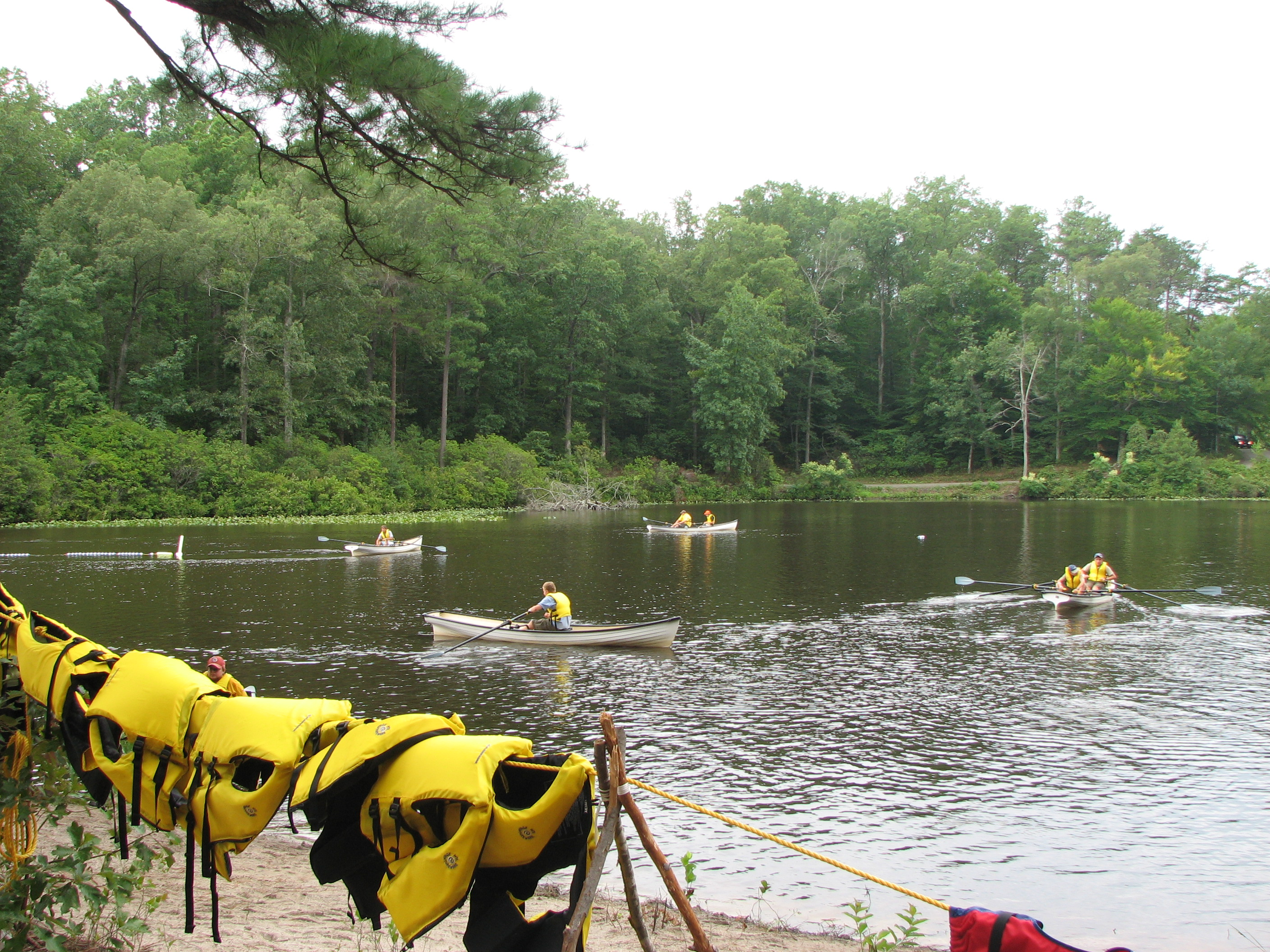
Racing Shells on Travis Lake

During the jamboree, many boating activities were located around Travis Lake. Because most of these were far from any other jamboree activities, they were called the "Outback Centers". Other activities dealing with nature or water were grouped with these.

- Canoe Slalom, in which Scouts were timed while navigating a course.
- Canoe Sprint, timed canoe racing.
- Conservation, a non-boating activity which was on the north end of Thomas Road. It dealt with conservation topics and had exhibits from many large companies and branches of government.
- Discover Scuba, another activity far from the rest of the outback centers. Scouts could try out scuba gear and play underwater games at the Thomas Road swimming pools.
- Dragon Boats, four canoes lashed together and rowed by 11 Scouts at a time.
- Fishing, a Thomas Road activity centered at Fishhook Lake. Scouts caught, cleaned, and cooked fish.
- Kayak Fun.
- Racing Shell Fun, including one- and two-man boats.
- Raft Encounter, in which Scouts built rafts and then raced them without using paddles.
- Snorkel Search, located at the Thomas Road swimming pools. Scouts looked for jamboree insignia in the water.

=== Activities ===
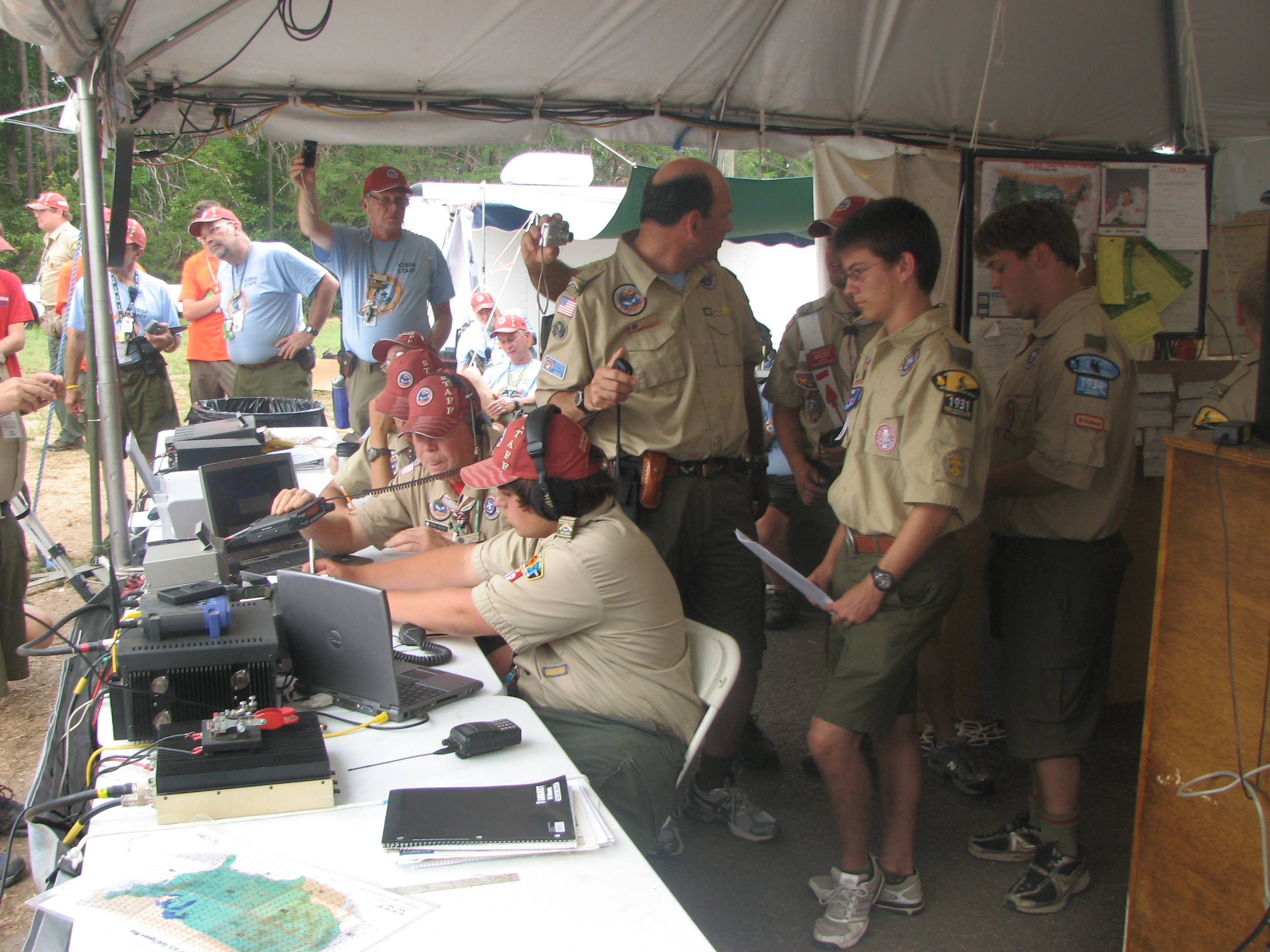
Scouts interview an astronaut on the International Space Station at K2BSA

These were other miscellaneous activities located in various areas of the site.

- American Indian Village, a reenactment of Native American life and traditions. Located next to the Merit Badge Midway.
- Brownsea Island Camp, a reenactment of the first Scout camp in 1907. Located near Trading Post "A".
- disAbilities Awareness, an area for Scouts to learn about various disabilities. Located next to Trading Post "A".
- K2BSA, an amateur radio station where Scouts could talk to people around the world and get their amateur radio license. Located across from the Mysterium Compass near Trading Post "A".
- Merit Badge Midway, offering 120 merit badges, many of which could be earned in one day. Located near the south end of Thomas Road across from the arena.
- National Exhibits, located at near the south end of Thomas Road next to the arena.
- Technology Quest, with technology exhibits from many large organizations such as NASA, Rockwell Collins, and National Geographic. Located next to Trading Post "A".
- The Outdoor Adventure Place (TOAP).

==== The Mysterium Compass ====
The Order of the Arrow's show at this jamboree was called The Mysterium Compass. It was the successor of the "Twelve Cubed" show presented at the 2005 jamboree. Tickets were distributed to the troops, with an average of 18 tickets for each one, enough for half of the Scouts to attend. The tickets instructed the Scouts to attend in patrols of 9, and each were good for one showing. The show was presented every 20 minutes but lasted over an hour. Each presentation of the program had three groups of four patrols of 9 Scouts each, that is, 108 people. No-shows were filled in with Scouts from a standby line. After doubling the amount of money spent on the jamboree, The Mysterium Compass cost over $1,000,000 to produce and had a staff of just above 300. It was closed to anyone over 18. Participants who completed the show were given a medallion for their jamboree emblem patches.

== Arena shows ==
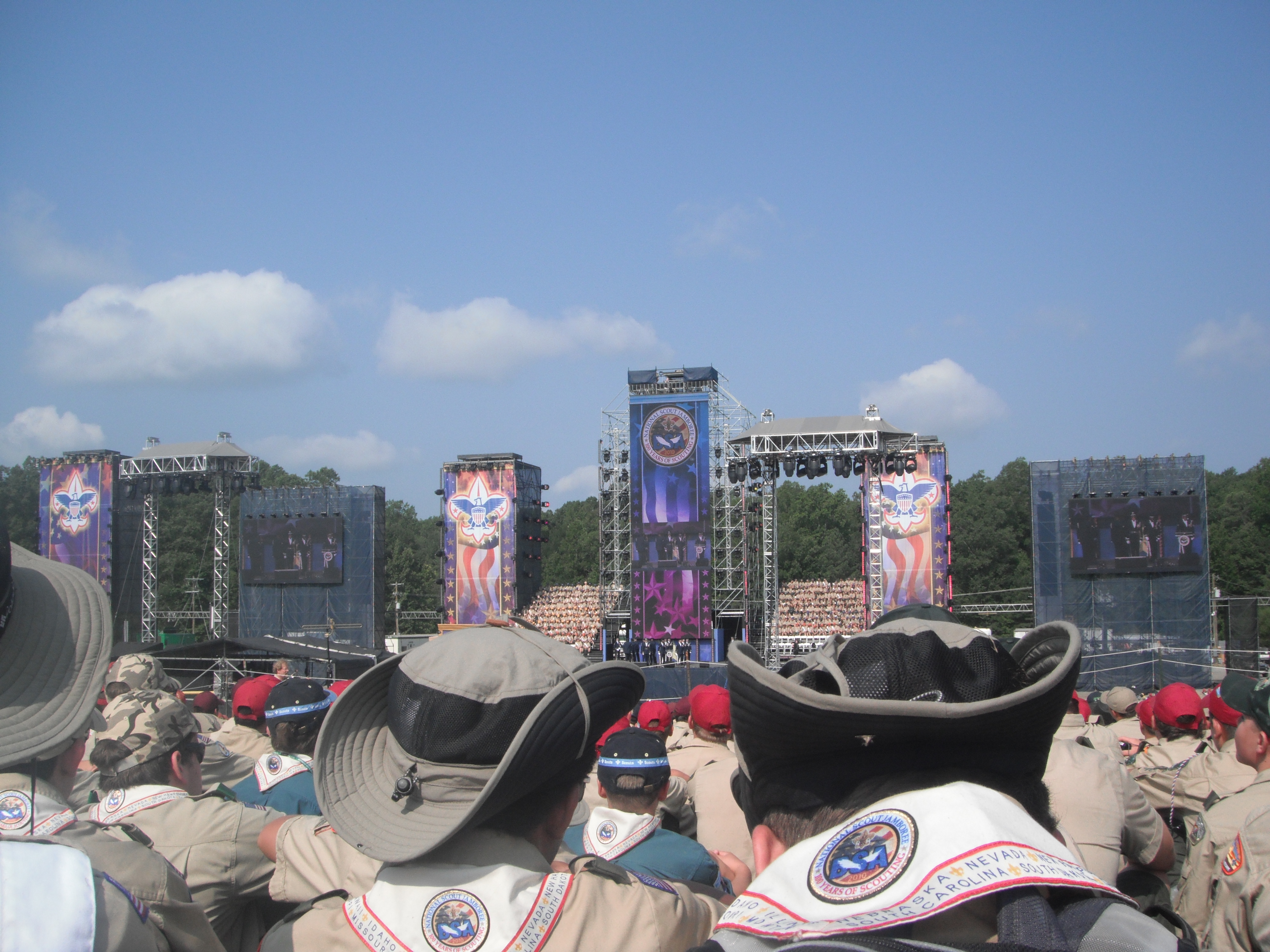
The arena show on July 28, 2010

The 2010 National Scout Jamboree featured two arena shows: one on July 28, and another one was held on July 31. Both arena shows featured Chief Scout Executive Bob Mazzuca. The first arena show featured several celebrities, including Sgt. Slaughter, Miss America Caressa Cameron, and Secretary of Defense Robert Gates. The main arena show featured Mike Rowe, host of Discovery Channel's Dirty Jobs, and musical performances by Alex Boyé, Honor Society and Switchfoot. The show ended with the largest fireworks display ever performed on a military base or at a national Scout jamboree. There was some controversy over President Obama not appearing, as he had chosen to pre-record his appearance on The View that day – instead leaving a video message congratulating the Boy Scouts of America on their centennial.

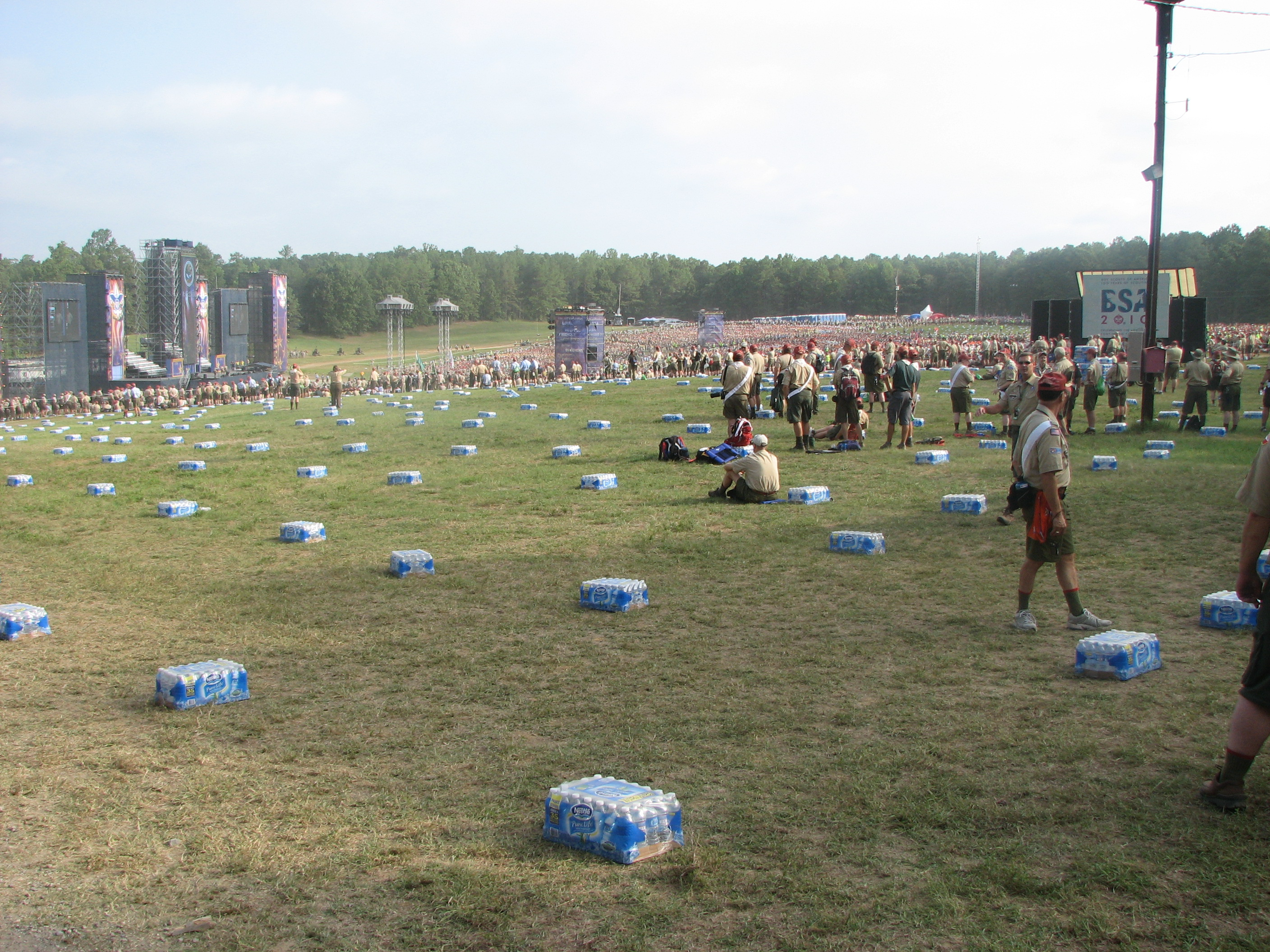
Cases of water bottles spread thickly on the arena seating area

At the 2005 jamboree, there were problems with a water shortage during the first arena show. This was not repeated in the second show or in those at the 2010 jamboree. Cases of water bottles were distributed everywhere on the arena seating area, with large stacks at the sides, back, and along the roads to the arena. In total, approximate three-quarters of a million bottles of water were placed in the arena during the 2010 National Scout Jamboree – in order to more effectively combat the risk of dehydration. On the way back to their camps from the second arena show after dark, some participants without flashlights had trouble avoiding running into extra cases of water bottles as they lay on the ground and the roads. A few others carried cases back to their camps because the water in the bottles tasted better than that distributed in the water system.

== Social networking ==
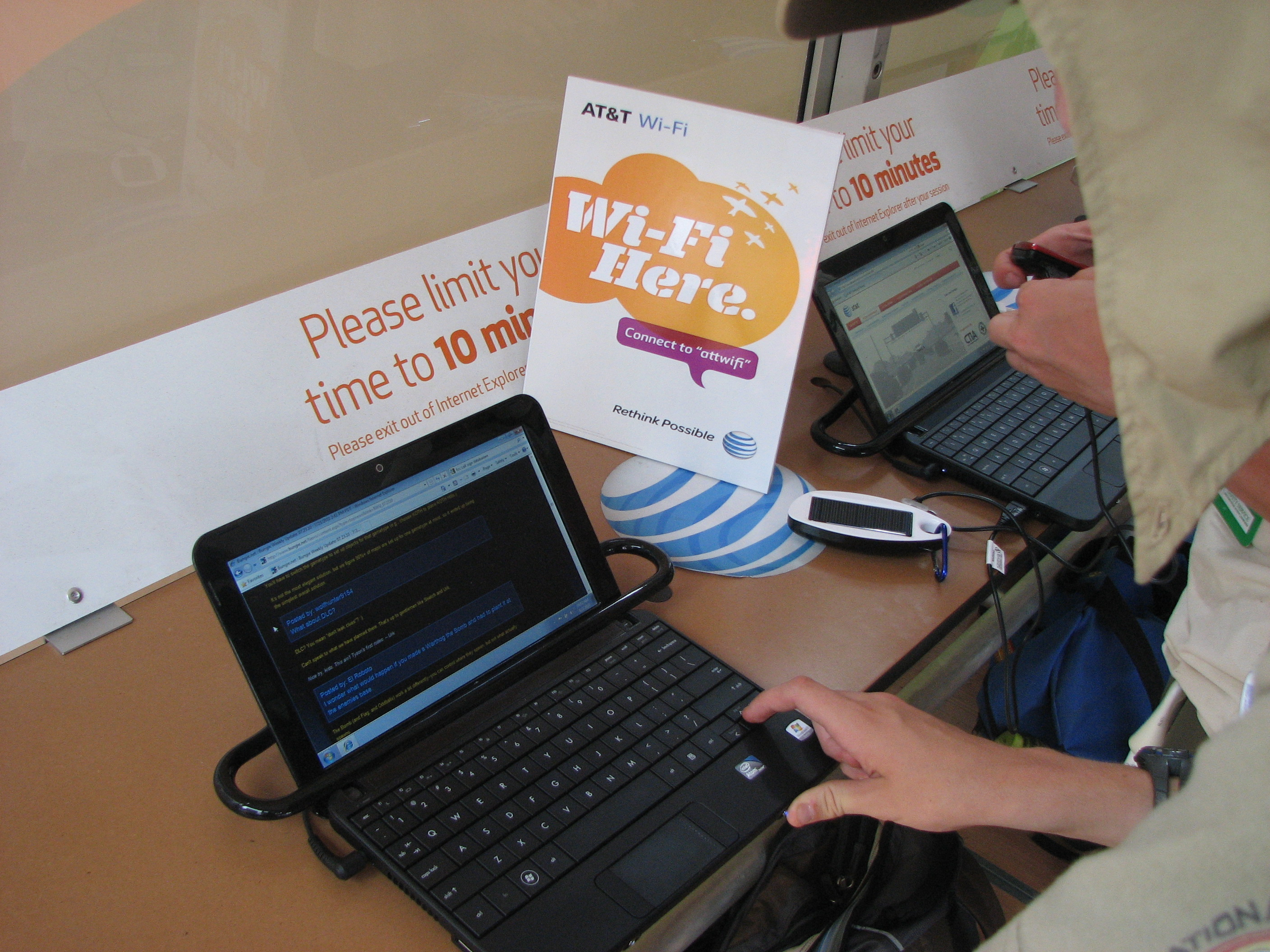
A Scout using a netbook at an AT&T Connection Center

There was a focus on social networking at this jamboree which was entirely new. Generally, Scouts are instructed to leave their electronics at home when on camping trips, but this event was an exception. AT&T, one of the corporate sponsors, provided excellent cell phone coverage and a Wi-Fi network which spanned the entire site. This effected "a better signal in [the jamboree site] than in most residential areas." AT&T also provided netbooks and cell phones for use by the Scouts in their Connection Centers, located throughout the site. There were also secure device charging lockers next to each connection center where phones or other devices could be recharged, although this set-up became controversial after Scouts began keeping the keys to the lockers in order to have a personal charging station. The jamboree trading posts sponsored competitions for videos and pictures submitted by participants. Staff members and signs placed around the site encouraged Scouts to tell about their experiences on various social websites. This allowed parents, siblings, and friends at home to get in on the action and see what was happening. Overall, the event was covered extensively on the internet as well as in local and national news.

== Deaths ==
A staff member was found dead in his bed on August 3, 2010; the cause of the death was cardiac dysrhythmia.
