= Capitol Area Council =

Non-profit organization in Texas, U.S.

Capitol Area Council (#564)
- Headquarters: The Frank Fickett Scout Training and Service Center 12500 North IH 25; Austin, Texas 78753
- Location: Central Texas
- Founded: 1912
- President: Marietta Scott
- Council Commissioner: Mani Kuruvila
- Scout Executive: Jon Yates
- Affiliation: Scouting America
- Website www.bsacac.org

Capitol Area Council is a 501(c)(3) and local council of the Scouting America, that serves Scouts and Scouting volunteers in 15 Central Texas counties surrounding Austin.

The council oversees programs in Bastrop, Blanco, Burnet, Caldwell, DeWitt, Fayette, Gillespie, Gonzales, Hays, Lavaca, Lee, Llano, Mason, Travis, and Williamson counties.

== History ==
The first Eagle Scout west of the Mississippi, was reported to be in Shiner, Texas.

The first troop in the Austin area was founded in 1911. Capitol Area Council was founded in 1912 as the Austin Council. In 1924, the name changed to the Austin – Travis County Council, then the Austin Area Council.

In 2011, the council headquarters moved from the intersection of US-290 and US-183 to its present location in North Austin. The new location has 3100 sq ft of staff offices, training and meeting facilities and a Scout Shop.

On February 8, 2025, the 115th anniversary, of BSA, the national council changed its name to Scouting America. The Scout Oath, Law and program remain unchanged.

=== Camp Tom Wooten (1934–1983) ===
In 1934, 125 acres of land on the banks of Bull Creek near the Colorado River in west Austin, was bought and given to the council. The land was turned into Camp Tom Wooten, named after Tom D. Wooten, the son of Dr. Goodall Wooten, who made the purchase and donation. In 1998, the camp was sold and the funds were used to purchase Lost Pines Scout Reservation on Lake Bastrop from the Lower Colorado River Authority.

== Organization ==
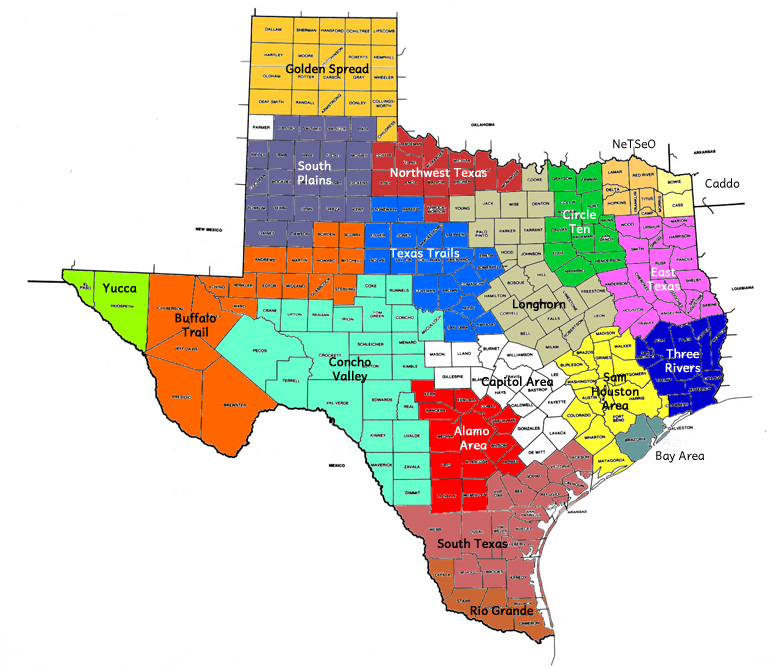
BSA Councils in Texas

The council is organized in to 12 districts that are aligned with Central Texas counties and local independent school district boundaries.

- Armadillo District
- Bee Cave District
- Blackland Prairie District
- Chisholm Trail District
- Colorado River District
- Hill Country District
- Live Oak District
- North Shore District
- Sacred Springs District
- San Gabriel District
- Thunderbird District
- Waterloo District

== Camps ==
- Lost Pines Scout Reservation – Bastrop County, Texas
- Griffith League Scout Ranch – Bastrop County, Texas
- Camp Alma McHenry – near Giddings, Texas
- Camp Green Dickson – near Gonzales, Texas
- Smilin V Scout Ranch – Liberty Hill (Williamson County), Texas
- Roy D. Rivers Wilderness Camp – Near Smithville, Texas

== Order of the Arrow – Tonkawa Lodge No. 99 ==
Tonkawa Lodge #99
- Totem: Thunderbird
- Founded: 1936
- Founders: Joe Lindsay, Jr. and Joe Lindsay, Sr
- Lodge Chief: Colin D
- Lodge Secretary: Logan W
- Vice Chief of Inductions: Roman D
- Vice Chief of Program: Owen M
- Vice Chief of Publications: Vacant
- Website www.tonkawa99.org

Tonkawa Lodge is the Order of the Arrow Lodge for Capitol Area Council. It was first chartered by the National Council on January 20, 1937, by Joe Lindsay Jr. and Joe Lindsay Sr., Tonkawa Lodge #99 started as Tejas Lodge but was later changed to Tonkawa in 1938 with lodge 72 already having the name. Tonkawa Lodge had one of its members become the Order of the Arrow National Chief in 2011, Jonathan "Bunker" Hillis. Currently Tonkawa Lodge #99 has 12 Chapters that are aligned and named with the Districts of the council.
