= Messengers of Peace (Scouting) =

Initiative by the World Organization of the Scout Movement

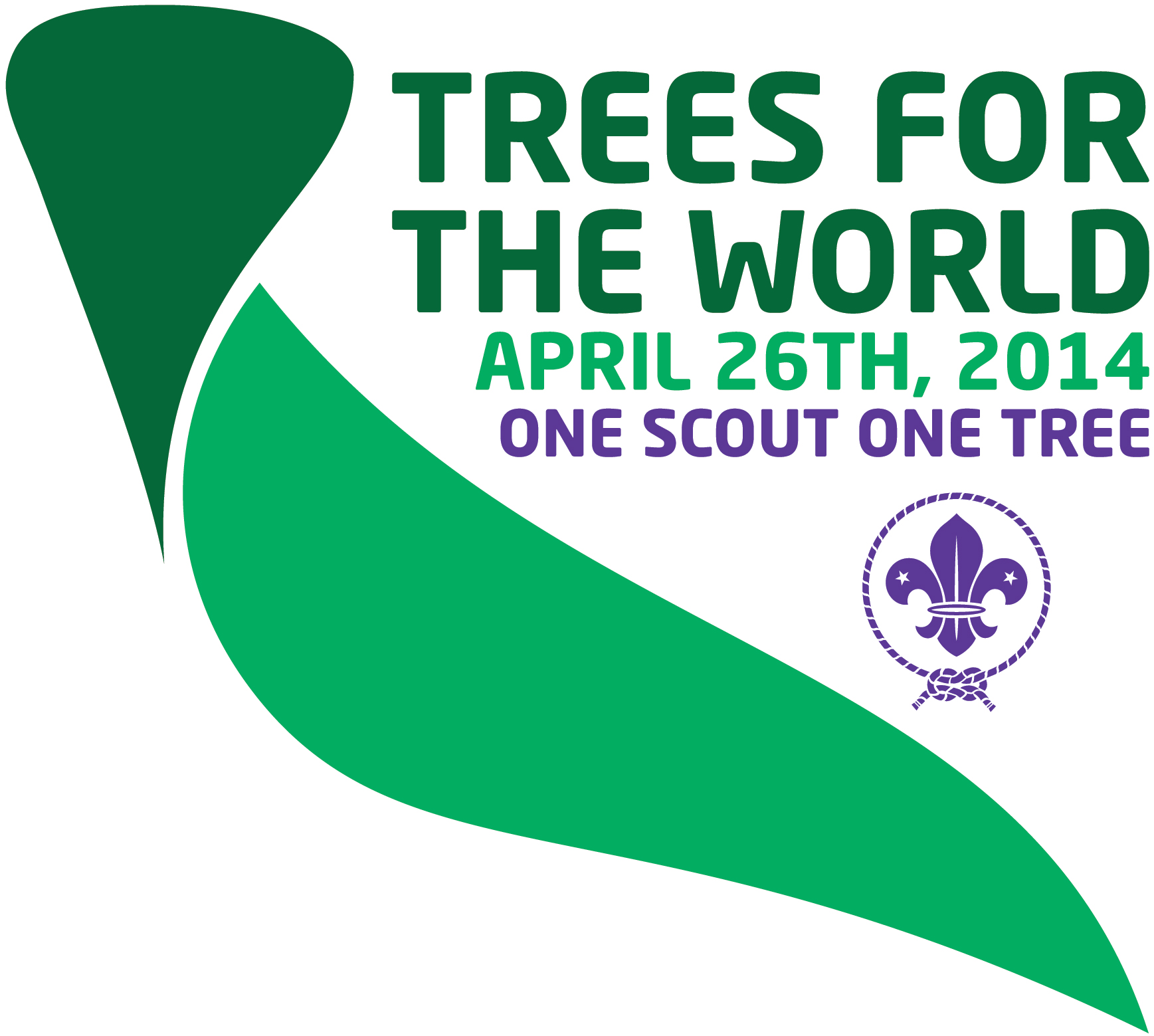
- Type of project: Initiative
- Established: 2011

The Messengers of Peace (MoP) programme is an initiative by the World Organization of the Scout Movement, which along with the Scouts of the World Award and the World Scout Environment Programmes form the Better World Framework programme. Since 2011, Scouts have committed to projects, of various scales, to make the world a more peaceful place and logged their hours on the Messengers of Peace Global Network site. Projects fall into three categories: Personal, Community, Environment.

The initiative is supported by King Abdullah of Saudi Arabia and King Carl XVI Gustaf, and follows on from the Gifts of Peace initiative to mark the centenary of Scouting in 2007. Funding has been made available to support The Messengers of Peace Support Fund.

Former President of Nigeria, Olusegun Obasanjo has been appointed as a Messenger of Peace Ambassador by the Africa Scout Region.

== Trees For The World ==
Trees For The World is an international Scouts Messengers of Peace project for Scouts around the world, in which each Scout will plant a tree on the Saturday after Earth Day.

The idea of Trees For The World started during the First Interamerican Leadership Training, with delegates of Argentina, Canada, Curaçao, Ecuador, Honduras, Panama, Saint Lucia, Saint Vincent and the Grenadines, and the United States brainstorming about the common problems that strike their nations. After a consensus, the creation of a long-term project that involved the Scouts of the world to spread a culture of peace and at the same time give an impact on their community was created. In September 2014, Trees For The World received a Messengers of Peace Hero Award.

The Trees For The World Organizing Committee (TFTWOC) (Spanish: Comité Organizador de Árboles Para El Mundo, COAPEM), founded in February 2014, is the group of Scouts involved in organizing and promoting the project. There are currently 12 TFTWOC members from 10 countries from the Interamerican Scout Region.

Trees For The World 2014 was open from April 26 to September 27, 2014. A total of 14,645 Scouts from 24 countries planted a total number of 57,161 trees.
