= National Scout jamboree (Scouting America) =

Primary national event of Scouting America

National Scout Jamboree
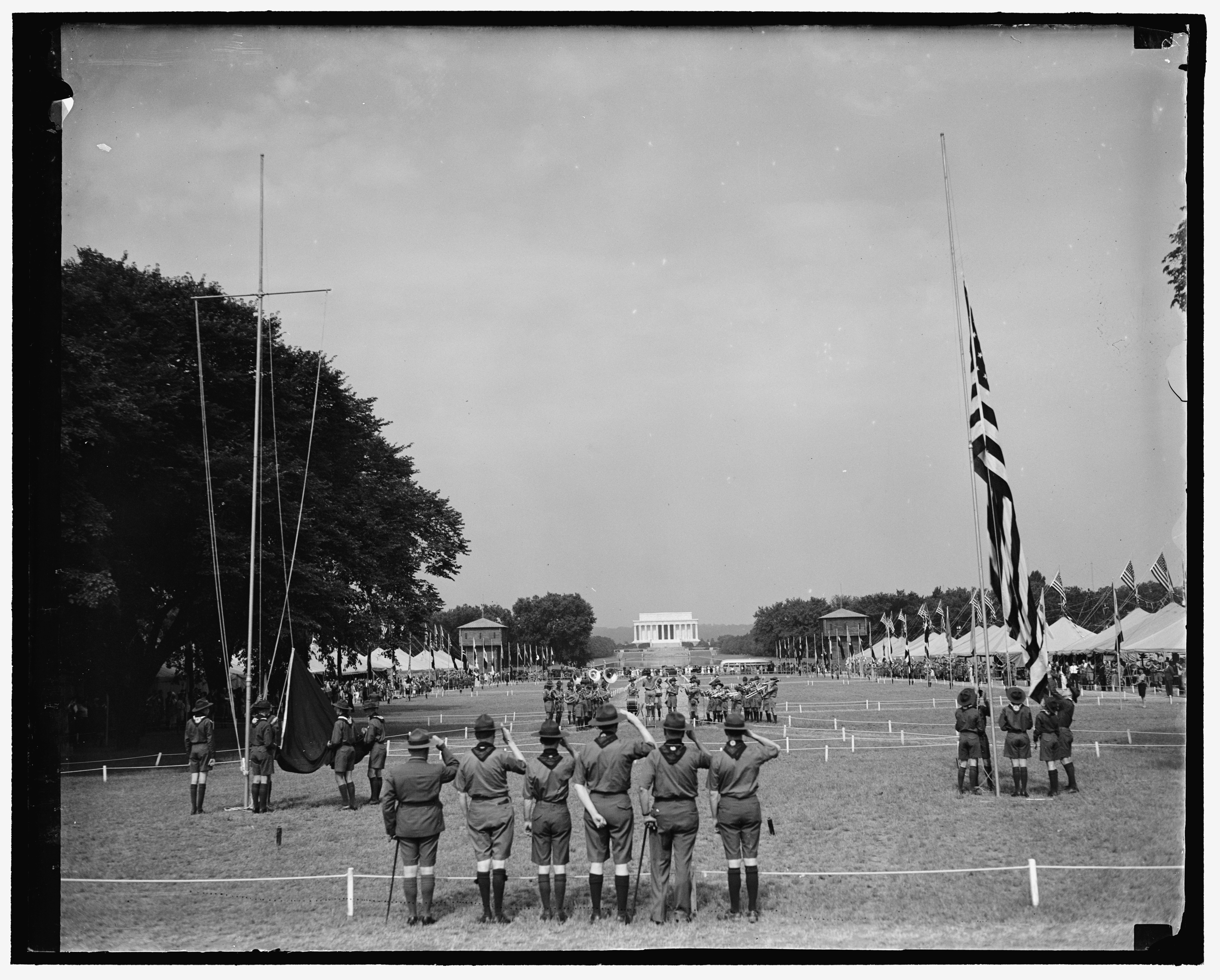
- Opening of the first Jamboree, on the National Mall in Washington, D.C., June 30, 1937
- Owner: Scouting America
- Location: Various
- Founded: 1937

The National Jamboree (formerly called the National Scout Jamboree) is a gathering, or jamboree, of thousands of members of Scouting America, usually held every four years and organized by the National Council of Scouting America. Referred to as "the Jamboree", "Jambo", or NSJ, Scouts from all over the nation and world have the opportunity to attend. There is also an event called World Scout Jamboree which is the same concept but instead of national it is international. They are considered to be one of several unique experiences that Scouting America offers. The first National Jamboree was scheduled to be held in 1935 in Washington, D.C. to celebrate the 25th anniversary of Scouting, but was delayed two years after being cancelled due to a polio outbreak. The 1937 Jamboree in Washington attracted 25,000 Scouts, who camped around the Washington Monument and Tidal Basin. The event was covered extensively by national media and attended by President Franklin D. Roosevelt.

Following the disruption from 1938-1945 of World War II, the next National Jamboree was not held until 1950 in Valley Forge, Pennsylvania. Subsequent National Jamborees have been held around the country as a means to promoting Scouting nationally. From 1981 to 2010, the National Jamboree was located in Fort A.P. Hill, Virginia. Since 2013, National Jamborees are permanently held at Summit Bechtel Reserve in Glen Jean, West Virginia. A National Jamboree is held for approximately a week and a half and offers many activities for youth participants and the 300,000 members of the general public who visit it. Staff members generally arrive several days in advance, and depart several days after participants leave, depending on their assignments. Subcamp staff stay in the subcamps with the troops, while most other staff stay in a staff camp.

== First National Jamboree ==
The first National Jamboree was held on the National Mall in Washington, D.C. from June 30 to July 9, 1937. It was attended by 25,000 Scouts. It set the stage for future National Jamborees.

Celebrities visited the National Jamboree, including well-known broadcaster Lowell Thomas and U.S. President Franklin D. Roosevelt. While at the National Jamboree, Scouts also attended a three-game baseball series between the Washington Senators and the Boston Red Sox at Griffith Stadium, as well as toured nearby Mount Vernon.

== List of Jamborees ==
Comanche Trail Council Indian Camp at the National Scout Jamboree in Washington, D.C., July 1937. The counterclockwise swastika emblems used for decoration still hold ancient meanings of luck and well-being, and not to be confused with clockwise Nazis symbolism.

The National Scout Jamborees have been held at a number of different locations.

Year	Location	Theme/Notes	Dates	Attendance
~~1935~~	Washington, D.C.	BSA Silver Jubilee (25th)	~~August 21, 1935–August 30, 1935~~	Cancelled due to a polio epidemic.
1937	Washington, D.C.	BSA Silver Jubilee (25th)	June 30, 1937–July 9, 1937	27,238
1950	Valley Forge, Pennsylvania	"Strengthen Liberty"	June 27, 1950–July 6, 1950	47,163
1953	Irvine Ranch, California	"Forward on Liberty's Team"; Area now called Newport Center and Fashion Island; Jamboree Road built for the event	July 17, 1953–July 23, 1953	45,401
1957	Valley Forge, Pennsylvania	"Onward For God And My Country"	July 12, 1957–July 18, 1957	52,580
1960	Colorado Springs, Colorado	"For God and Country"; BSA Golden Jubilee (50th)	July 22, 1960–July 28, 1960	56,377
1964	Valley Forge, Pennsylvania	"Strengthen America's Heritage"	July 17, 1964–July 23, 1964	50,960
1969	Farragut State Park, Idaho	"Building to Serve"	July 16, 1969–July 22, 1969	34,251
1973	Farragut State Park, Idaho	"Growing Together"	August 1, 1973–August 7, 1973	73,610 (Combined)
1973	Moraine State Park, Pennsylvania	"Growing Together"	August 3, 1973–August 9, 1973	73,610 (Combined)
1977	Moraine State Park, Pennsylvania	"Forward Together/Scouting USA"	August 3, 1977–August 9, 1977	28,601
1981	Fort A.P. Hill, Virginia	"Scouting's Reunion with History"	July 29, 1981–August 4, 1981	29,765
1985	Fort A.P. Hill, Virginia	"The Spirit Lives On"; BSA Diamond Jubilee (75th)	July 24, 1985–July 30, 1985	32,615
1989	Fort A.P. Hill, Virginia	"The Adventure Begins...With America's Youth"	August 3, 1989–August 9, 1989	32,717
1993	Fort A.P. Hill, Virginia	"Scouting...A bridge to the Future"	August 4, 1993–August 10, 1993	34,449
1997	Fort A.P. Hill, Virginia	"Character Counts...Be Prepared for the 21st century"	July 28, 1997–August 6, 1997	36,015
2001	Fort A.P. Hill, Virginia	"Strong Values, Strong Leaders...Character Counts"	July 23, 2001–August 1, 2001	42,002
2005	Fort A.P. Hill, Virginia	"Character Not Only Counts, It Multiplies"	July 25, 2005–August 3, 2005	43,307
2010	Fort A.P. Hill, Virginia	"Celebrating the Adventure, Continuing the Journey" (100th Anniversary)	July 26, 2010–August 4, 2010	43,434
2013	Summit Bechtel Reserve, West Virginia	"Go Big. Get Wild."	July 15, 2013–July 24, 2013	40,795
2017	Summit Bechtel Reserve, West Virginia	"Live Scouting's Adventure"	July 19, 2017–July 28, 2017	31,000
~~2021~~	Summit Bechtel Reserve, West Virginia	"Face the Challenge"	~~July 21, 2021–July 30, 2021~~	Cancelled due to COVID-19 pandemic
2023	Summit Bechtel Reserve, West Virginia	"Forward"	July 19, 2023–July 28, 2023	15,700
2026	Summit Bechtel Reserve, West Virginia	"Elevate"	July 22, 2026–July 31, 2026	12,000

== Organization ==
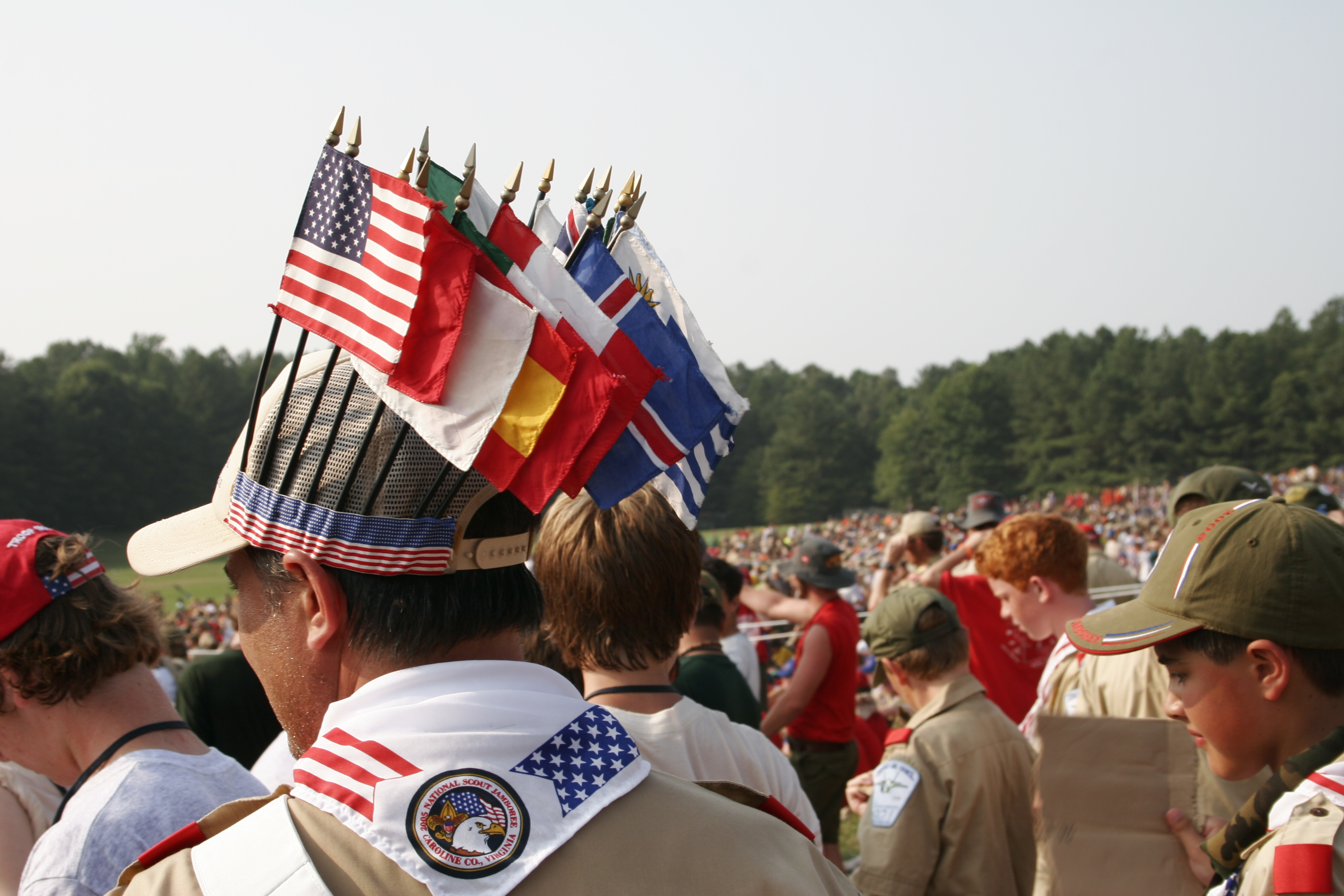
Scouts from all over the country and the world showed up for the 2005 jamboree.

Like the Boy Scouts of America's national organization, the National Jamborees were originally divided into regions—Western, Central, Southern, and Northeast. Each region was made up of five to six subcamps, with twenty in all. Each subcamp has its own latrines, shower facilities, food commissaries. Each subcamp contains a number of troops, identified by a three or four digit number depending on the location of the subcamp within the encampment. The 2005 National Scout Jamboree had 20 subcamps, identified by number and named after famous explorers (e.g. Robert Ballard, Steve Fossett, Joe Kittinger, and Will Steger.)

Effective with the 2013 National Jamboree, subcamps are not operated by the regions, but by sub camps that contain contingents from different parts of the country. Separate subcamps are also maintained for adult staff, Venturers, and international contingents.

=== Troops and Contingents ===
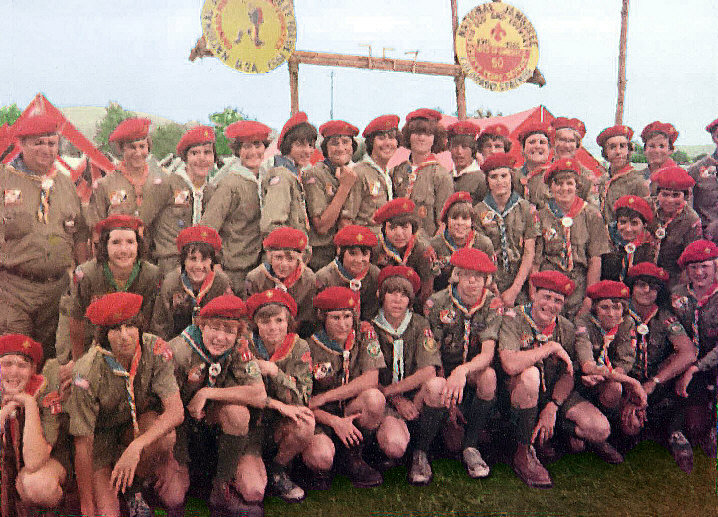
Dutchess County Council (NY) troop at the 1977 National Scout Jamboree, held at Moraine State Park, Pennsylvania

Attending the National Jamboree is an intensive and expensive process. Considering the logistics of having thousands of youth and their leaders concentrated in one area at one time, the National Council coordinates the entire National Jamboree process. A normal troop or crew cannot petition to attend the Jamboree as participants, instead, the local council establishes a National Jamboree committee which is charged with promoting and facilitating the experience to their members. Local council committees typically have volunteer members responsible for finance, fundraising, training, recruitment, transportation, touring while en route to the Jamboree site, and other functions where appropriate.

To attend the National Jamboree, a Scout must be a currently registered member of Scouting America in a Scouts BSA troop, Venturing Crew, or Sea Scout Ship. If attending as a member of Scouts BSA, a Scout must be at least 12 years of age and no older than 17 years of age. If attending as a member of a Venturing Crew or Sea Scout Ship, a Scout must be at least 13 years old and have completed the eighth grade or is age 14 and not yet 21 years of age.

To attend the National Jamboree as a contingent adult leader, an adult must be a currently registered member of Scouting America and no less than 21 years of age.

Youth members sign up for the National Jamboree through an application process and each Scout is assigned to a National Jamboree troop. Large councils are granted multiple National Jamboree troops. After being assigned a National Jamboree troop, members are given their troop numbers, a participant's patch for wear on the Scout's field uniform, and the council's National Jamboree shoulder patch. Training and preparation for the National Jamboree often begins more than a year before the actual National Jamboree begins.

=== Staff ===
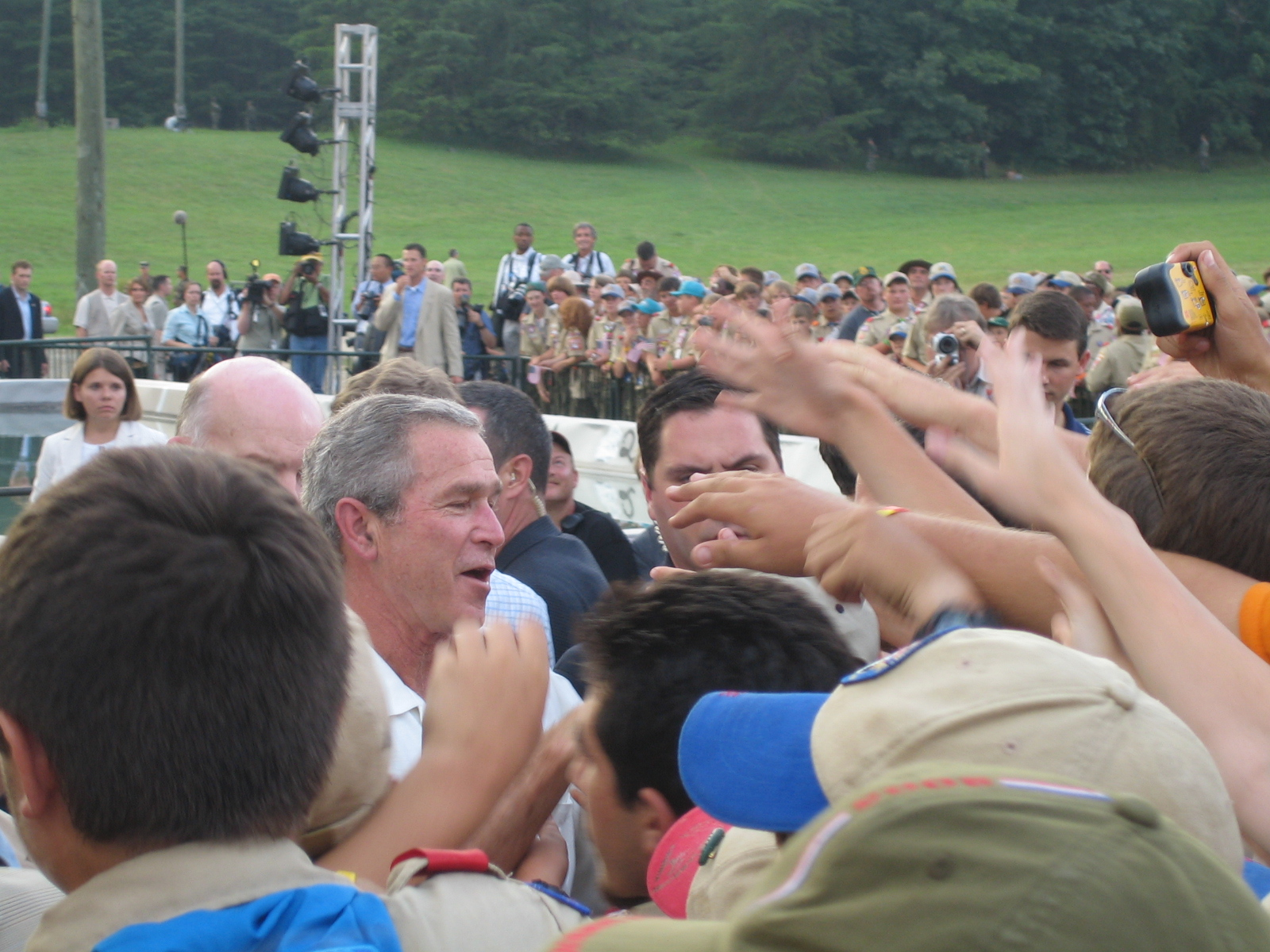
Eight US presidents have been present at the National Jamboree. George W. Bush pays a visit during the 2005 National Scout Jamboree

Youth and adult volunteer and professional Scouters provide a number of services to the National Jamboree by being on staff. Additionally, when the National Jamboree was at Fort A.P. Hill, members of the military and government services also assisted with providing services to the National Jamboree. National Jamboree staff are given special tokens of their service, plus many of the different staff groups have special patches or pins that are sought after by youth and adult participants. In addition to the staff that provide services in subcamps and at the activity centers, many other staff members work in areas that serve the entire National Jamboree. Staff members arrive a number of days before the National Jamboree begins and usually depart on the same day or a few days later.

== The Summit ==
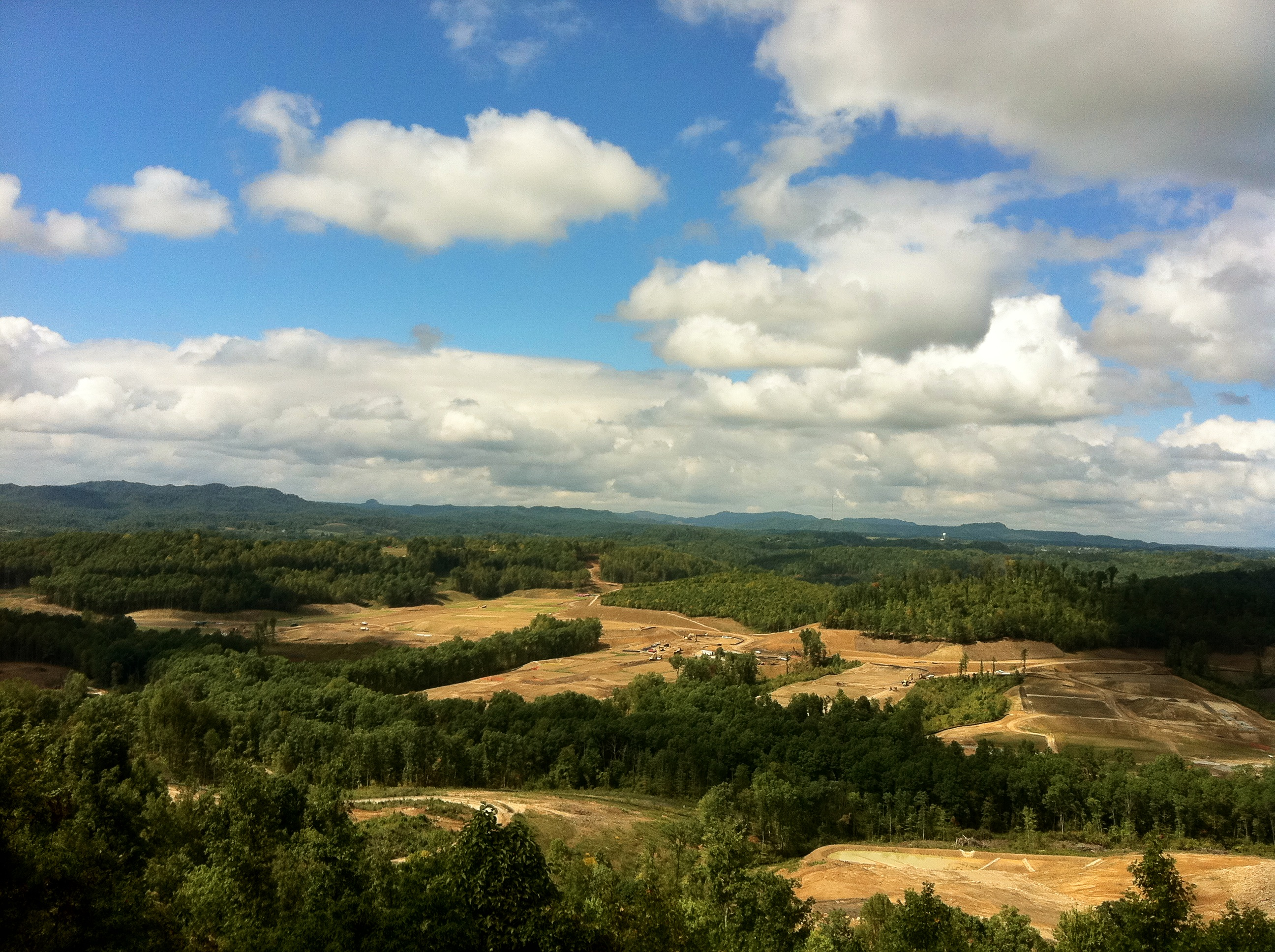
Overlook of the Summit site, cleared out before general construction in 2011

The BSA announced in June 2008 that locales interested in permanently hosting the National Jamboree should submit applications to the National Council. Permanent jamboree site considerations included 5,000 acres (20 km^{2}) to be donated or leased for 100 years, water, natural beauty, transportation, ability to also host World Jamborees, and use as a high adventure/training center in non-jamboree years.

Goshen Scout Reservation in Virginia was selected for the new site in February 2009, but was withdrawn due to significant restrictions on land utilization and local community opposition.

The Summit Bechtel Family National Scout Reserve in the New River Gorge region was chosen as the new home of the National Scout Jamboree in November 2009. The purchase of the property was made possible by a $50 million gift from the S. D. Bechtel, Jr. Foundation. Other donations, including a $25 million donation from The Suzanne and Walter Scott Foundation and a gift of an undisclosed amount from Mike and Gillian Goodrich, as well as other donations, have brought the total amount of contributions for The Summit to over $100 million in under one year. A portion of the 10,000-acre (40 km^{2}) property is a reclaimed mine site once known as Garden Grounds. It is located along the New River Gorge National River near Mount Hope, West Virginia and north of Beckley, West Virginia.

Early announcements from The Summit team at the 2010 National Scout Jamboree, and subsequently on Facebook announced that Venturing would be a part of the National Jamboree, not just as staff, but as participants. This marked the first appearance of Venturing at a National Jamboree, and the first attempt to expand the program to include the senior Scouting program of the BSA since the attempted inclusion of Exploring at the 1989 National Jamboree.

== Jamboree traditions ==
=== Patch trading ===
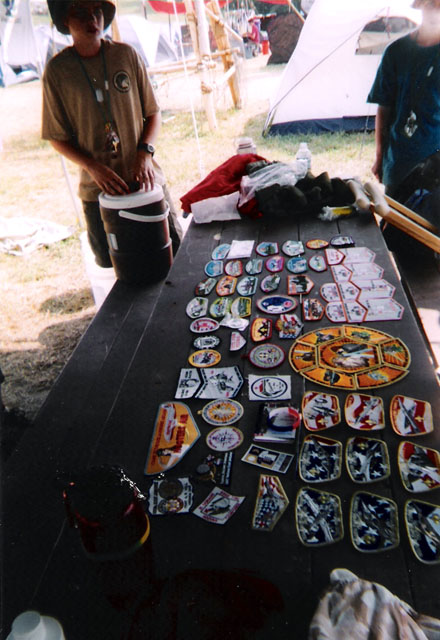
A patch collection from the 2005 National Scout Jamboree

Most troops that attend a National Jamboree have a special patch, or series of patches, made especially for the National Jamboree. Once at the National Jamboree, Scouts trade their council's patches for patches from across the US and even the world. At each National Jamboree there are always several patches that are highly sought-after, usually ones relating to something in pop culture. At the 2001 National Scout Jamboree, one of the most sought after patches were the Marvel contingent patches from Theodore Roosevelt Council in Nassau County, Long Island, New York which would also see 2 more future sets in 2005 and 2010. At the 2005 National Scout Jamboree, popular patches displayed such things as Ron Jon Surf Shop, Master Chief from Halo, Star Wars characters, Super Mario, SoBe energy drink, and the unofficial, yet still sought after, Hooters patches. The 2005 Marvel set from Theodore Roosevelt Council included the first "talking" patch. Its Order of the Arrow flap set had a chip inside that welcomed Scouts to the National Jamboree and included Teddy Roosevelt's signature cheer, "BULLY!" The voice for this (and the 2010 set) were recorded using a pair of Nakamichi CM-700 vintage microphones by one of the 2 designers of the patches. At the 2010 Jamboree, sought-after patches included Marvel superheroes from both Theodore Roosevelt Council and Northern New Jersey Council, Halo, Blues Brothers, the Orange County set (filled with vibrant images of surfers), the Central Florida Guitars (which made music when squeezed), the Great Salt Lake racers, and all sorts of military helicopters and planes, as well as a reappearance of the Hooters patches. Other unofficial patches included a set of Order of the Arrow pocket flaps which included designs from popular internet games, such as Farmville.

=== Gateways ===
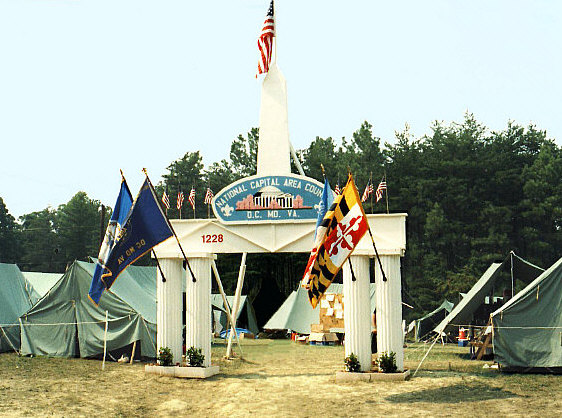
Gateway from National Capital Area Council at the 1993 National Scout Jamboree

Each unit that attends the National Jamboree is assigned to a campsite. In front of the campsite, the troop constructed a gateway to display trademarks of their council or state. Gateways ranged from the very simple to the extremely elaborate. Gateways were eliminated beginning in 2013 to match World Jamboree standards of providing standard camping equipment upon arrival, thus allowing contingents to travel by air.

=== Stadium shows ===
Typically opening and closing shows are planned that celebrate and promote Scouting brotherhood. Attended by all participants, staff, and visitors, crowds can be large in excess of 50,000 persons. Speeches are made by dignitaries. Presidents Franklin D. Roosevelt, Harry S. Truman, Dwight D. Eisenhower, Lyndon Johnson, George H. W. Bush, Bill Clinton, George W. Bush, Donald Trump, Vice President Richard M. Nixon, First Lady Nancy Reagan, Secretary of State Rex Tillerson, Secretary of Defense Robert M. Gates, senators, and governors have all attended. Singers and bands such as The Kingston Trio, Burl Ives, the Oak Ridge Boys, the Beach Boys, Lee Greenwood, and Louise Mandrell, and Switchfoot have performed. Entertainers have included Roy Rogers and Dale Evans, Bob Hope, Danny Thomas, Sgt. Slaughter, and Dirty Jobs' Mike Rowe in 2013. At the 1953 Jamboree where comedian Bob Hope was master of ceremonies, he quipped that the assembled 45,000 Scouts, including boys from 23 other countries, were like "the United Nations in short pants". The pre-show entertainment has included performances by military bands, jumping demonstrations by the Army Black Knights, flyovers, and the Jamboree Band.

== Military support lawsuit ==
On April 4, 2007, a US Court of Appeals ruled that federal support for the National Jamboree may continue.

== See also ==
- Jamboree Road
- Boy Scout Memorial
