= List of councils (Girl Scouts of the USA) =

Local councils of the Girl Scouts of the USA

The program of the Girl Scouts of the USA is administered through local councils.

Each council covers a geographic area of the United States, that may vary in size from a single U.S. county to multiple U.S. states.

== List of local councils ==
Local councils of the Girl Scouts of the USA, within U.S. states, and in Insular areas and Territories of the United States, currently includes:

- Alaska
- Arizona Cactus-Pine
- Black Diamond
- California's Central Coast
- Caribe
- Carolinas Peaks to Piedmont
- Central & Southern New Jersey
- Central and Western Massachusetts
- Central California South
- Central Illinois
- Central Indiana
- Central Maryland
- Central Texas
- Chesapeake Bay
- Citrus
- Colonial Coast
- Colorado
- Commonwealth
- Connecticut
- Dakota Horizons
- Desert Southwest- Southern New Mexico & West Texas
- Diamonds of Ark. Okla. & Texas
- Eastern Iowa and West Illinois
- Eastern Massachusetts
- Eastern Missouri
- Eastern Oklahoma
- Eastern Pennsylvania
- Eastern South Carolina
- Eastern Washington and North Idaho
- Farthest North
- Gateway
- Greater Atlanta
- Greater Chicago and NW Indiana
- Greater Iowa
- Greater Los Angeles
- Greater Mississippi
- Greater New York
- Greater South Texas
- Green and White Mountains
- Gulfcoast
- Hawaii
- Heart of Central California
- Heart of Michigan
- Heart of New Jersey
- Heart of Pennsylvania
- Heart of the Hudson
- Heart of the South
- Historic Georgia
- Hornets' Nest
- Jersey Shore
- Kansas Heartland
- Kentuckiana
- Kentucky's Wilderness Road
- Lakes and Pines
- Louisiana East
- Louisiana-Pines to the Gulf
- Maine
- Manitou
- Michigan Shore to Shore
- Middle Tennessee
- Missouri Heartland
- Montana and Wyoming
- Nassau County
- Nation's Capital
- NE Kansas and NW Missouri
- New Mexico Trails
- North Carolina Coastal Pines
- North East Ohio
- North-Central Alabama
- Northeast Texas
- Northeastern New York
- Northern California
- Northern Illinois
- Northern Indiana-Michiana
- Northern New Jersey
- Northwestern Great Lakes
- NYPENN Pathways
- Ohio's Heartland
- Orange County
- Oregon and Southwest Washington
- River Valleys
- San Diego
- San Gorgonio
- San Jacinto
- South Carolina - Mountains to Midlands
- Sierra Nevada
- Silver Sage
- Southeast Florida
- Southeastern Michigan
- Southeastern New England
- Southern Alabama
- Southern Appalachians
- Southern Arizona
- Southern Illinois
- Southern Nevada
- Southwest Indiana
- Southwest Texas
- Spirit of Nebraska
- Suffolk County
- Texas Oklahoma Plains
- Tropical Florida
- USAGSO (American Scouting overseas)
- Utah
- Virginia Skyline
- West Central Florida
- Western New York
- Western Ohio
- Western Oklahoma
- Western Pennsylvania
- Western Washington
- Wisconsin - Badgerland
- Wisconsin Southeast

== See also ==
- Local councils of the Girl Scouts of the USA
- Girl Scouts of the USA topics
- List of councils (Boy Scouts of America)
