= Camp Wildwood =

Camp Wildwood may be:

- Camp Wildwood (Florida)
- Camp Wildwood (Indiana)
- Camp Wildwood (Massachusetts)
