= Greater Tampa Bay Area Council =

Boy Scouts of America council

Greater Tampa Bay Area Council (#089)
- Owner: Boy Scouts of America
- Headquarters: Tampa, Florida
- Country: United States
- Founded: 2016-05-01
- Scout Executive: Greg Balog
- Council President: Rachelle Bedke
- Council Commissioner: Matthew Cordani
- Website tampabayscouting.org

Greater Tampa Bay Area Council serves Scouts in West-Central Florida with the council headquarters in Tampa, Florida. Youth are served in the following nine counties: Citrus, Hardee, Hernando, Highlands, Hillsborough, Pasco, Pinellas, Polk and Sumter. Greater Tampa Bay Area Council was formed on May 1, 2016, by the merger of Gulf Ridge Council with West Central Florida Council.

== Organization ==
The council is split into six districts:

- Ft Brooke District serving northern half of Hillsborough County
- Heartland District serving Hardee County, Highlands County, and Polk County
- Chautauqua District serving of Pinellas County
- Suncoast District serving Pasco County (including Trinity, New Port Richey, Land O’Lakes, Dade City, Zephyrhills, and Wesley Chapel)
- Timucua District serving Southern half of Hillsborough County
- Withlacoochee District serving Citrus, Hernando and Sumter counties

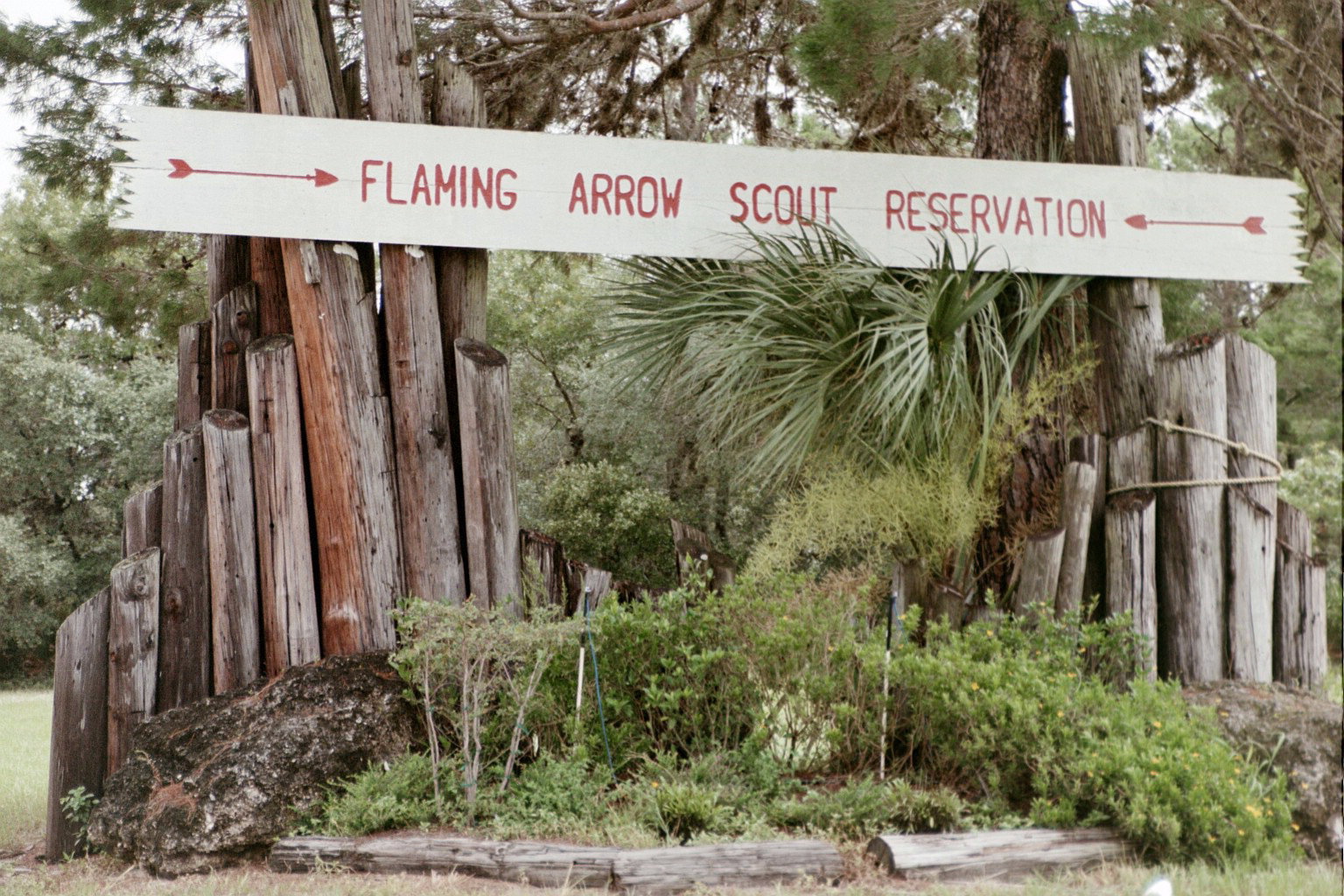
Flaming Arrow Scout Reservation

== Camps ==
=== Flaming Arrow Scout Reservation ===
Flaming Arrow Scout Reservation (FASR) is a 677-acre Boy Scout Camp located in the pine flatwoods outside of Lake Wales, Florida, on the shores of three spring fed lakes.

=== Sand Hill Scout Reservation ===
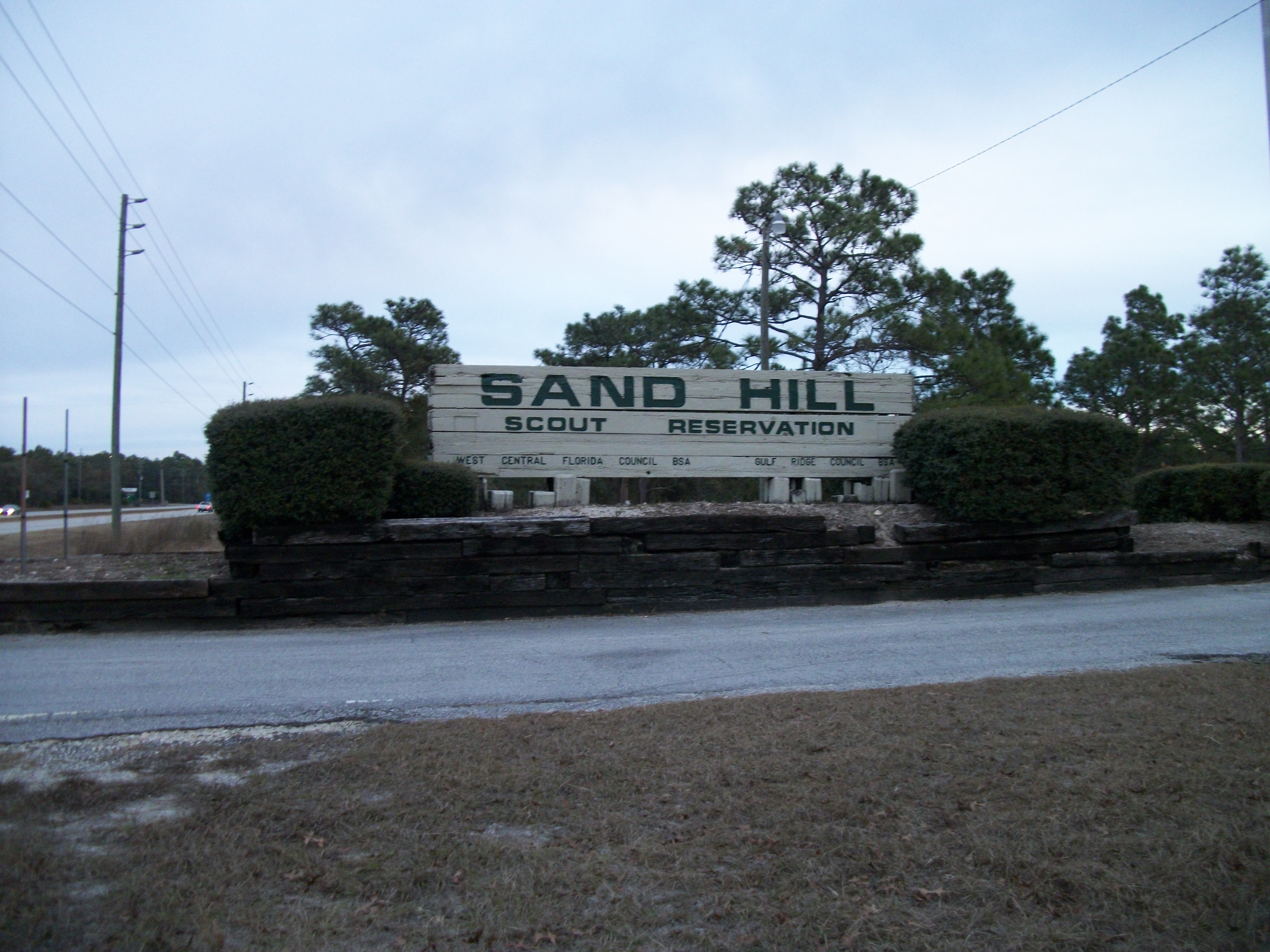
Sign for the entrance to the Sand Hill Scout Reservation in Spring Hill, Florida.

Sand Hill Scout Reservation is a Scout camp of over 1,212 acres (4.90 km^{2}) in the west central Florida region, located near Spring Hill, Florida. Sand Hill Scout Reservation belongs to the Cub Scouts, Boy Scouts, Varsity Scouts, and Venturers of the Greater Tampa Bay Area Council and is intended for their instruction and enjoyment.

=== Camp Soule ===
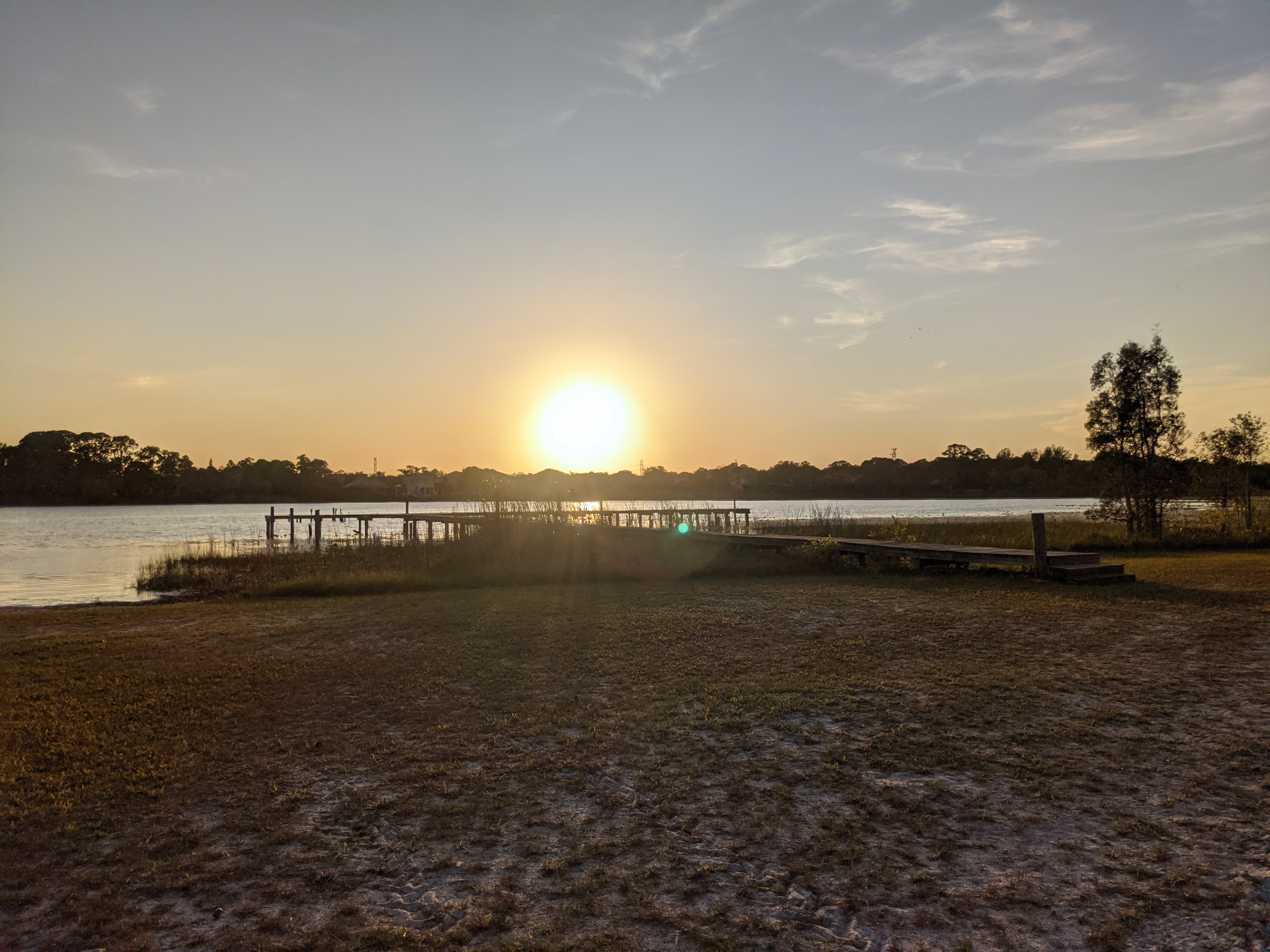
Sunset over the Camp Soule's dock in Clearwater Florida.

Camp Soule serves the Scouting Community in the West Central Florida area. It is located on 50 acres (200,000 m^{2}) of pristine wilderness, in the heart of Clearwater, Florida. It offers protected trees, wildlife, and beauty centered in the most populous county of Florida. Camp Soule offers four improved campsites (with Adirondack shelters, latrines, and showers), six primitive campsites, a dining hall, trading post, large activity fields, Olympic-size swimming pool, pool house, BB gun range, Cub Scout and Boy Scout archery ranges, two cabins, Council campfire ring, chapel, and a full time ranger on property.

=== Camp Owen J Brorein ===
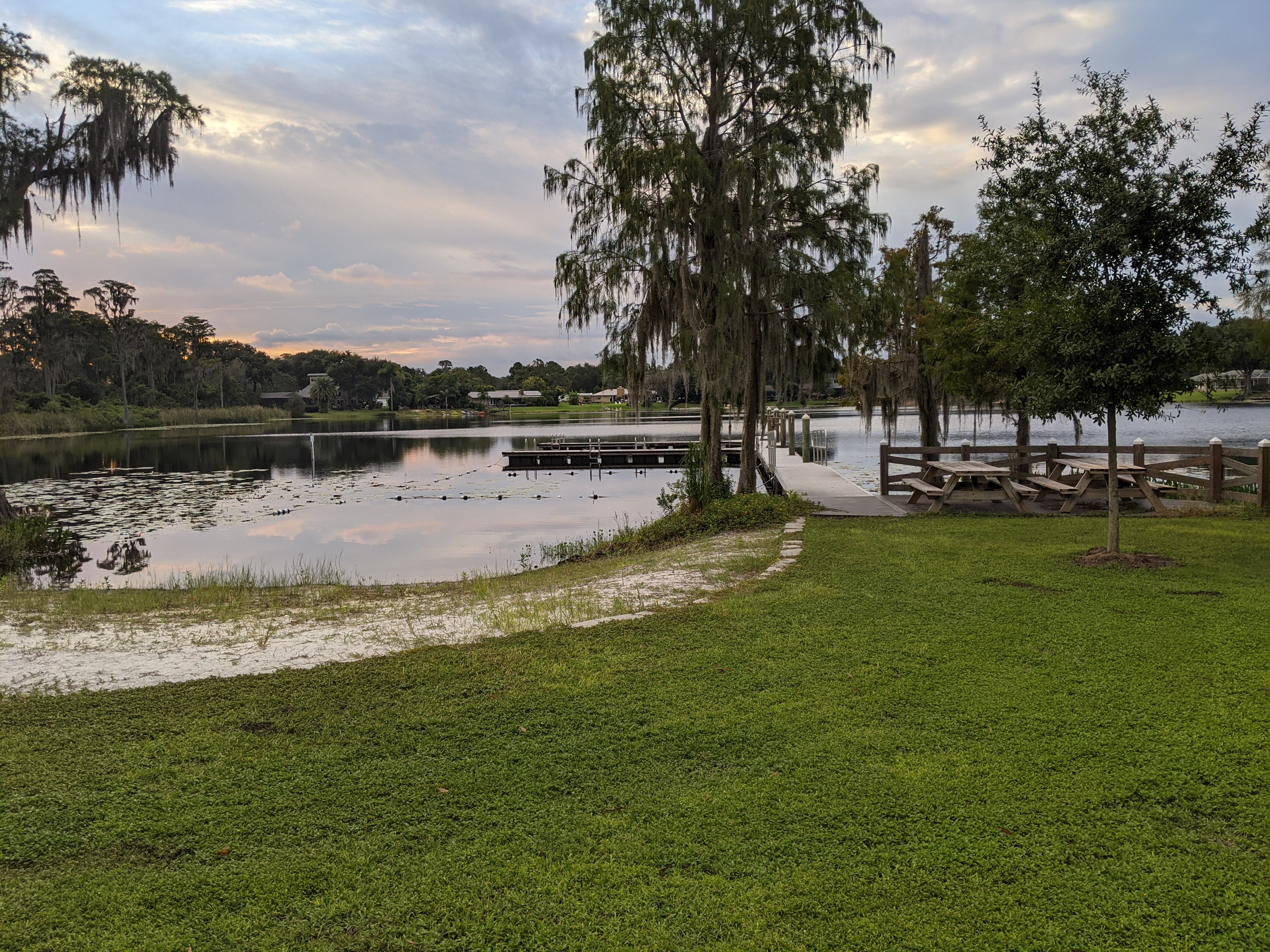
Camp Brorein waterfront on Little Moon Lake

Centrally located in the Hillsborough County community of Odessa, Camp Brorein is the council's oldest camping facility. Located in Odessa Florida, this camp has been dedicated to the advancement of Scouting from its founding in 1923.

=== Camp Alafia ===
Camp Alafia is a primitive camp near Lithia and east of Tampa in Hillsborough County. The property is bounded to the west by the Alafia River and contains several campsites beneath an oak canopy.

== Order of the Arrow ==
=== Uh-To-Yeh-Hut-Tee Lodge ===
Uh-To-Yeh-Hut-Tee Lodge 89
- Owner: Greater Tampa Bay Area Council
- Founded: 2016
- Website uhtoyehhuttee.org

Uh-To-Yeh-Hut-Tee Lodge #89 is the Greater Tampa Bay Area Council's Order of the Arrow lodge, one of eight in Section E-5 covering the state of Florida (except the Panhandle).

Uh-To-Yeh-Hut-Tee Lodge 89 was formed in 2016 with the merger of Seminole Lodge 85 and Timuquan Lodge 340. The merger was effective during the weekend of August 5 – 7, 2016. The transition team chose the name, which means lighting, and the totem, which is the Bull. Uh-To-Yeh-Hut-Tee Lodge has been serving the Greater Tampa Bay Area Council and local communities since 2016.

The lodge is organized into six chapters corresponding to the council's districts:

- Suncoast District - Abiaca Chapter
- Skyway District - Calusa Chapter
- Fort Brooke District - Netopalis Tachquiwi Chapter
- Miccosukee District - Osceola Chapter
- Timucua, Thunderbird and Lake Region Districts - Pèthakhuwe Chapter
- Withlacoochee District - Withlacoochee Chapter

=== Pre-Merger OA Lodges ===
Seminole Lodge

Seminole Lodge was an Order of the Arrow lodge associated with the Gulf Ridge Council, located in West-Central Florida.

Chartered in 1936 while under the name Kiondashama, the lodge name was changed to Seminole by September, 1938. Seminole is the name of a Native American people whose original homelands included portions of Florida.

In 1951 Seminole Lodge lost its charter, but just one year later they were once again active. Seminole was the oldest lodge in the section and at the time of the merger was celebrating its 80th anniversary. The lodge has had one member serve as national chief in 2003, Nick Digirolamo.

Timuquan Lodge

The West Central Florida Council's Order of the Arrow Lodge was Timuquan Lodge 340, founded in 1946 and was named in honor of the extinct Timucua Native American tribe of northern and central Florida.

The first Brotherhood members of Timuquan Lodge were Selwyn Fuller, Joe Reed, Roger W Irving and Charles Martin.

At the time of the merger Timuquan Lodge was celebrating its 70th anniversary.

== See also ==
- Scouting in Florida
