= Gulf Ridge Council =

Local council of Scouting America

- Owner: Boy Scouts of America
- Headquarters: Tampa, Florida
- Country: United States
- Website http://www.gulfridgecouncil.org

Gulf Ridge Council served Scouts in west-central Florida with the council headquarters in Tampa, Florida. Youth were served in the following eight counties: Citrus, Hardee, Hernando, Highlands, Hillsborough, Pasco, Polk, and Sumter.

== History ==
Gulf Ridge Council merged with West Central Florida Council on May 1, 2016, to form the Greater Tampa Bay Area Council.

== Districts ==
- Allohak District
- Fort Brooke District
- Lake Region District
- Thunderbird District
- Timucua District
- Withlacoochee District
- Ucita District

== Seminole Lodge ==
Seminole Lodge is an Order of the Arrow lodge associated with the Gulf Ridge Council, located in west-central Florida. Members of the lodge belong to the Order of the Arrow, a national scouting honor society.

Chartered in 1936 while under the name Kiondashama, the lodge name was changed to Seminole by September, 1938. Seminole is the name of a Native American people whose original homelands included portions of Florida.

By 2007, the most recent year figures are available, the membership of the Seminole Lodge numbered 635.

In 2016, after BSA National suggested a merge between Gulf Ridge and West Central Florida Councils, the lodges proceeded to merge as well. In late August, the Lodge Executive Council merger committee released the new lodge name and totem. The new name is Uh-To-Yeh-Hut-Tee, "lightning" in Seminole. The totem is a Florida Cracker Bull, selected for the importance of the introduction of cattle had upon the people, industry, and culture of the Tampa Bay area.
