= Firecrafter =

Boy Scouts service organization

- Owner: Crossroads of America Council
- Location: Indiana
- Country: United States
- Founded: 1920
- Website http://www.firecrafter.org/

Firecrafter is a service organization within Scouting America. Formed in 1920 by Francis Obed Belzer, the Firecrafter Organization mainly operates within the Crossroads of America Council, Indiana. However, it has been known to exist in other areas including Illinois, New York, and Texas. Firecrafter is centered on the ideals of friendship, leadership, and service.

== History ==
Before the United States entered World War I, Francis Obed Belzer was named the first Scout Executive of the Indianapolis Council in 1915 (known as the Indianapolis and Central Indiana Council from 1934 to 1942). With Scouting's early emphasis on athletics instead of Scoutcraft skills, many different ancillary programs were piloted throughout the United States to reinforce Scouting skills and its core values. One such program in place was the three-tiered rank system at Daniel Carter Beard's Culver Woodcraft Camp.

Seeing a need for a new program in Indiana, in conjunction with Stanley L. Norton, assistant executive, and Rex Pruitt, Scoutmaster of Troop 46, Belzer created the Camper and Woodsman ranks in 1919 at Camp Chank-Tun-Un-Gi, (Camp Belzer) located near Fort Benjamin Harrison in Indianapolis. The program was a success throughout the 1919 camping season, so Pruitt, Norton, and Belzer set out to create a third camp rank for the following summer.

The "third and highest" rank was introduced, unnamed, in 1920. The first group of four young Woodsmen completed the requirements. It was custom to recognize the new Camper and Woodsman rank recipients at the last campfire of the camping week, and when it came time to recognize the four Scouts, they were not mentioned. As the ceremony concluded with Norton's Scoutmaster's benediction, the four Scouts were instructed to remain behind. As the rest of the campers went back to their tents to retire for the evening, those four Scouts, along with Belzer, Norton, Pruitt, and P.D. Hoelscher (the camp's physical director) became the first to take Firecrafter's Unknown Test.

A fourth honorary camp rank, Minisino, was introduced in 1921 to recognize those who went above and beyond in service to Scouting and Firecrafter itself.

At one point in time, many Midwestern councils had a Firecrafter program in operation. After the adoption of the Order of the Arrow on a national level, many of these programs were closed completely or merged into the Order's program. It was the only honor camping program in the Central Indiana Council until 1972, when Central Indiana Council was merged with Delaware County Council, Whitewater Area Council, and Kikthawenund Council to form the new Crossroads of America Council. Concerned Firecrafters and Arrowmen met to settle their differences, and both programs were allowed to continue.

Before 1972, all Firecrafters wore a pocket flap patch on the right pocket, indicating where the member was from within the council. He also wore a 3-inch pocket patch on the right pocket, indicating his Firecrafter rank. After the merger, the Order of the Arrow was given exclusive use of the pocket flap, while Firecrafter kept its use of the temporary patch position on the pocket itself.

=== From 1990 to today ===
Firecrafter today exists in Central Indiana, Southern Illinois, and Texas. The Central Indiana Firecrafter Organization exists in Crossroads of America Council (Indianapolis).

A Southern Illinois Firecrafter organization around the Flora, Illinois area operating separately of the Crossroads Fire organization which conducted a ritual as recent as 1997, who plays an important role in the history of Firecrafter today.

Throughout 1997 and into 1998, there were discussions between various Council Committee members, advisers, and members of the Crossroads Firecrafter organization (on an informal basis only) to formally recognize the Southern Illinois Firecrafter organization and join the two Fires into one. This was not accomplished due to several major differences between the two associations:

- The Southern Illinois organization was not sanctioned by the Okaw Valley Council in any way, shape, or form. The Council did not sanction the use of the 3-inch pocket patch as temporary insignia, nor the pocket flap that is used to identify the member's home ember (most of the members used velcro and switch between their ember flaps and Order of the Arrow insignia).
- The Southern Illinois organization's requirements for Minisino are significantly different from the Crossroads organization's, creating dissension on grandfathering Minisino between the two. Illinois Minisinos generally as a rule did not wear Indiana Minisino insignia but Indiana Minisinos were permitted to wear the Illinois insignia.
- There were significant operating differences between the two organizations' ritual codes.
- The Royal Order of Hi-Bark remained at that time, an active part of the Southern Illinois program. There are several Indiana members who were inducted into the Royal Order of Hi-Bark in Illinois in 1993 and 1997 on an honorary basis as a token of fraternal bonds between Illinois and Indiana, and their status as Hi-Barks is not widely known except to their close Scouting friends and family.

While Indiana members were invited to the Southern Illinois Rituals between 1993 and 1997, their direct involvement in the induction process there was strictly limited to an observation role only, and the invitations and knowledge of the Illinois ritual were controlled by a small group of Indiana Firecrafters. This group ensured that only Indiana Firecrafters who were willing to comply with the unspoken "no participation" rule were permitted to make the trip to Flora for the Ritual.

In 1999, there were several conditions added to the Minisino Code which explicitly prohibited the wear of Southern Illinois insignia at Crossroads functions or even within the Crossroads boundaries and considered violations of the policy punishable by a council Minisino Disciplinary Committee, a controversial body composed of the Council Chief, the Council Minisino Chairman, and the Council Minisino Adviser. The 1999 Minisino Code revision made a few other changes to the Minisino program without approval by the Council Committee, specifically to administrative succession and the nomination and approval of adults for Minisino. The changes were written by the Council Chief, the Minisino Chairman, and the Minisino Adviser, without comment from any other members of the organization. This led to a temporary crisis within Firecrafter and an overhaul of its governing documents.

These amendments, coupled with changing attitudes towards females in Scouting, particularly female Scouters, led to major review of the Firecrafter Constitution and By-Laws, including the Firecrafter Code and the Minisino Code. The 2000 revision of all four documents clarified inconsistencies in the administration of the program, made all language gender neutral, and provided for Firecrafter's growth into the next century.

== Rank system ==
Firecrafter is divided into two Cub Scout ranks, three Boy Scout ranks, and one honor. Each rank is established so that advancement through the system is a process of building upon knowledge that a scout learned in their last camp rank and increasing their skill in scoutcraft. It is also designed to teach the scout personal responsibility and serve as a tool to encourage advancement and attendance at summer camp.

- Webelos Camper is the first Cub Scout camp rank of Firecrafter, designed to be the introduction for a First-Year Webelos Scout to Boy Scouting. It is administered at either a council day camp or Webelos Adventure Camp by staff Firecrafters to a group of scouts.
- Webelos Firelight is the second and final Cub Scout camp rank of Firecrafter, designed to serve as a foundation for the Arrow of Light and the young cub's transition into Scouts BSA. It is only administered at Webelos Adventure Camp as the last requirement is to participate in the Spark of Interest Trail, which introduces Firecrafter in true form. Firelight is the most recent rank added to the Firecrafter rank system.
- Camper is the first BSA camp rank of Firecrafter. Camper is designed to supplement and support the programming for a young scout's first year of camp. It is a basic review of the Scout/Tenderfoot requirements and introduces the new scout to long-term camp.

The Woodsman pocket insignia.

- Woodsman is the second BSA camp rank of Firecrafter. Woodsman is designed to give the young scout a taste of Firecrafter at its best, as well as serve as a review of Second Class and First Class requirements and reinforce Firecrafter's core values to them. Woodsman is slightly harder than Camper, naturally. The scout must build a fire which will burn for fifteen minutes without the addition of any new wood and with only two matches. They must also be able to tie several knots used around camp, and fix a meal for themselves without using utensils.
- Firecrafter is the third BSA camp rank. Firecrafter is the mountain top experience for the third-year camper in which their attentiveness to the core values of Friendship, Leadership, and Service will be put to the test. Firecrafter requires preparation before camp - a scout must have several elements of their candidacy planned prior to that point. It is designed to encourage a Scout to push themselves to create personal growth, as well as to encourage the scout to progress further on the path to Eagle, and therefore, serves as a critical element of any Scouting program within the Crossroads of America Council. A candidate has seven days to complete the Firecrafter card, with the exception of requirement 13 (that of the Firecrafter Ritual), and the requirements provide a learning experience unique to each young man's character and skill level. Firecrafter carries with it several prerequisites: the scout must be 13 years of age, they must hold First Class rank, must have earned Camper and Woodsman, and they must not be 21 years of age by the time of the Firecrafter Ritual. There are several requirements for Firecrafter that serve to provide long memories for the Scout. They must make a fire-by-friction unassisted, complete five successive uniform inspections, and plan, lead, and execute a campfire program of specified format and design. At the conclusion of the in-camp candidacy, the Scout is invited to attend the inductions weekend, the Firecrafter Ritual, which is similar in form and fashion to the Order of the Arrow Ordeal and is discussed briefly below.

The Minisino pocket insignia.

- Minisino is the honorary camp rank of Firecrafter. Named from a Miami word meaning "Tried and Proven", a Minisino is a Firecrafter selected for the honor based upon their service to Firecrafter and to Scouting. The setting for most Minisino ceremonies is when all the campers are gathered together for flags or at a campfire. There is a skit, song or announcement by a Minisino. At the conclusion of the skit, the Minisino "popping" the ceremony will say, "May your tongues be silent, and your minds attentive, you are about to witness a Minisino ceremony!" As the beginning of the Minisino crowning ceremony states, "To him alone, who by his service, devotion, and achievements, proves himself worthy of high trust, comes recognition. Many may aspire, but the Gifts of Manitou are precious and descend only upon those who efforts and achievements most nearly meet his requirements..." The specific requirements for the honor are known only to Minisinos and Minisino candidates (some health professionals know the requirements to prevent hazing) but it is publicly stated in the selection ceremony that the candidate is on trial for two camping weeks to prove themselves to the Minisinos in camp and their fellow Scouts.

== Becoming a youth Firecrafter ==
The process for becoming a Firecrafter as a youth often serves as one of Scouting's significant events. After earning the Camper and Woodsman ranks, a young man is often encouraged to candidate for Firecrafter in their third year at summer camp. They are prepared for their candidacy by other youth and adult Firecrafters in their home troop, who instruct the candidate on what is expected of them throughout their candidacy and after they become a Firecrafter.

At summer camp, a young man declares their candidacy for Firecrafter by notifying the Firecrafter Coordinator, or Consul of the Fire, of their intentions. The Consul adds the candidate to the list of candidates for the week and issues the candidate their requirement card, handbook, and fire-by-friction log. On Sunday night of camp, the candidate takes part in an induction ceremony, which explains to the candidate the expectations that they will be held to during the next week. The candidate is then free to complete their requirement card as they see fit. All candidates meet once a day for a full field uniform inspection and brief candidate's meeting with the Consul. Three major events are part of the candidate's card. Most often, these are the events which will hold a Scout back from completing their card:

- Building a fire-by-friction, unassisted, which must burn for fifteen continuous minutes.
- Leading a campfire program, a form of camp-wide entertainment featuring skits, songs, stunts, a Scoutmaster's benediction, and a major theme.
- The Firecrafter overnighter, where the Scout must demonstrate basic First Class Scout skills in preparing for an overnight camping trip.

The most important requirement of the Firecrafter candidacy at camp is Requirement #1. All ranks in the Firecrafter system share this requirement, and it is most important at this step in the program:

Understand and demonstrate the high standards of Firecrafter in personal attitude and example, showing respect for your fellow campers and your environment. Discuss the ideals of Scouting and Firecrafter with your Scoutmaster.

In this requirement, the Scoutmaster is given the ultimate and final decision as to whether the young man will be permitted to undertake the Ritual. The Scoutmaster usually makes this decision in consultation with the rest of the Firecrafters in the unit after the Friday evening activities in camp, but this is not required.

If the candidate is not successful in meeting the first twelve requirements by the time the unit leaves camp on Saturday morning, the candidacy is terminated and the candidate is not invited to the Firecrafter Ritual. Should the candidate complete his requirements card, and it is properly endorsed by the Firecrafters in his unit and the Consul, the candidate will be invited to the next Ritual for examination and induction and face the Unknown Test.

== Firecrafter ritual ==
The Ritual is, simply put, a period of testing, a period of reflection, and a period of induction. In keeping with the standards of Scouts BSA, the Ritual is safeguarded and not secret, and there is nothing contained therein that would challenge a young person's ideas or place them in danger or harm. Hazing is not permitted or tolerated during any part of Firecrafter's program.

Since the creation of the Council Committee in the early 1960s, it has become tradition to hold two rituals every summer; The Mid-Summer Ritual which usually lands in July, and the Grand Ritual which is held in mid to late August. Although the Council owns four camps (Krietenstein, Belzer, Kikthawenund, and Ransburg), Krietenstein and Belzer are no longer usable for the Firecrafter Ritual because of a lack of space for both candidates and staff. Before Crossroads of America Council sold Red Wing and Bear Creek, and the unusability of Krietenstein and Belzer, there were general rules that developed. Before 2022, Belzer was the site for the Grand every 5 years on significant Anniversaries. Before they were sold, Red Wing and Bear Creek served as primary locations for the Mid-Summer Ritual because they did not interfere with summer camp activities at the camp, though Belzer was the site for the Mid-Summer Ritual in 2010. Should the Council Committee decide to host the Mid-Summer Ritual at one of the operating summer camps, portions of the Ritual are held in a part of camp widely secluded from campers that weekend.

The Mid-Summer Ritual is generally the "dress run" for the larger Grand Ritual in August. Usually, less than seventy-five candidates participate in the Mid-Summer Ritual, with the bulk of candidates (sometimes well over a hundred and eighty) participating at the Grand Ritual.

Council, Flame, and Ember officers are also elected at the Grand Ritual. Adult Alumni Association officers are elected on Friday night at the Alumni meeting, with youth officers elected on Sunday morning.

== Organization ==
Being that Firecrafter is a Scouting organization, it follows standard organization of a BSA Council. Troops operate their own Firecrafter programs supplemented by Firecrafters both in their own troop and experienced camp staff members during long-term summer camp. Members are organized at the district level into Embers. Different Embers close in location consist of a flame. There are three Flames which comprise the Fire, or Council. Officers of Firecrafter at the Ember, Flame, and Council level comprise the Firecrafter Council Committee, the policy-making body of Firecrafter. Any youth member of Scouting America that has earned a camp rank of Firecrafter is a member of the Firecrafter Organization, however, most events that take place are for those who hold the Firecrafter rank.

Adult volunteers and professionals above the age of 21 who were not members as youth may become Firecrafters upon nomination by a Firecrafter and become members of the Firecrafter Alumni Association. Those members who were inducted as youth keep their rank upon their 21st birthday and likewise become part of the Alumni Association. However, all members of the Alumni Association are required to pay yearly or life dues; youth members do not pay any form of yearly dues whatsoever.

Members generally continue to participate in Firecrafter for their entire lifetime. There are former youth officers that have become adults that serve as officers in the Alumni Association or as advisers to the Council Committee.

== Identity and traditions ==
Being that Firecrafter is a camp rank organization, many different traditions have been started and continued from generation to generation, and these traditions have contributed to the identity of Firecrafter, making it a unique part of the Scouting experience in Central Indiana.

- Firecrafters have a unique signature used for Firecrafter and Scouting business. Any person that holds the rank of Firecrafter is permitted to sign their name with three capital X letters (representing three teepees) immediately following: John Scout XXX. Further, Minisinos are permitted to sign their name with an underlined M immediately before their name: M John Scout. The signatures are often used on documents relating to Firecrafter only.
- Part of the Firecrafter rank requires that the candidate build a fifteen-minute fire. At the conclusion of the fire three holes are burned in the middle of the card at the fire-by-friction requirement for Firecrafter, as an attest to the candidate's completion of the requirement, and to represent the three core values of friendship, leadership, and service.
- As part of the induction process, Firecrafter candidates are usually guided to the final step of induction by members of their Scouting unit or members of their own family.

Back of the insignia rounder, signed by fellow Firecrafters

- In the earlier years of the organization, the new Firecrafter was presented with a leather backing for his Firecrafter pocket patch called a rounder by his guide at the induction ceremony. Usually made of two pieces of leather laced together with colored lace and a fob for attaching to the right pocket button of the field uniform, the rounder's lace generally identified where the new Firecrafter completed his candidacy. In present-day Firecrafter, the candidate usually either picks the colors of his rounder, it is made for him by a fellow Firecrafter, or his troop wears the same colored rounder.
- Still pertaining to the patch rounder, Scouts or Scouters who are close to the new Firecrafter or helped them attain the rank are usually expected to sign the back as a sign of welcome and passage into the organization.
- As Firecrafter was and is a camp-based organization, the different Crossroads camp staffs maintain their own separate identity within the organization and usually compete with each other on a regular basis. Higher ranking Council officers and officer candidates are usually affiliated with a camp staff (or Fire) organization, leading to fierce but healthy competition between the Ransburg, Belzer, Kikthawenund, and Krietenstein Fire organizations.
- Members of the various Fires usually gather immediately after the induction ceremony at the Firecrafter Ritual and carry out their own traditions. Normally, these traditions include the singing of the camp hymn and various spirit chants.
- Adults selected for the Minisino Honor do not complete a two-week candidacy like youth, but instead are "crowned" or officially recognized, usually during a summer camp or Firecrafter function.
- There is a Ritual flag that is flown during the inductions weekend, and the senior members of the Ritual staff (Chief Trail Guide, Assistant Chief Trail Guide, and Adult Chief Trail Guide) sign the flag as a mark of their service to Firecrafter. However, this is a more recent tradition dating back to the 1970s or '80s
- After Grand Ritual and until the start of Summer Camp the next year is known as the off-season. There are currently three main activities that occur during the off-season: Firecrafter Fall Frenzy, Mid Winter Dinner, and Spring Fellowship.
- Once a Firecrafter candidate has completed his fire by friction, it is traditional for any Firecrafters present to sing "Mrs. O'Leary's Cow" (the Chicago Fire song).

== See also ==
- Order of the Arrow
- Scouting America
- Tribe of Mic-O-Say
- Tribe of Tahquitz
- Scouting in Indiana
- Scouting in Illinois
