= West Central Florida Council =

Local council of Scouting America

- Owner: Boy Scouts of America
- Headquarters: Seminole, Florida
- Location: Pinellas County, FL, west Pasco County, FL
- Country: United States
- Founded: 1917
- Defunct: May 1, 2016
- Website www.wcfcbsa.org

West Central Florida Council was the former Boy Scouts of America Council serving Pinellas County and west Pasco County in Florida, between 1917–2016. It merged with Gulf Ridge Council to form the Greater Tampa Bay Area Council on May 1, 2016.

At the time of its merger, over 6,000 youth and 4,000 adult volunteers were served by the West Central Florida Council. More than 100 young men earned the rank of Eagle Scout in 2012. The West Central Florida Council earned the prestigious 2008 Centennial Quality Council Award from the Boy Scouts of America.

== History ==
West Central Florida Council was originally chartered as the Pinellas Council in 1917. Pinellas Area Council changed its name to West Central Florida Council in the late 1970s to recognize that west Pasco County had been a part of the Council for many years.

== Organization ==
The West Central Florida Council was divided into three distinct geographical Districts to best serve the youth of Pinellas and west Pasco Counties.

- Anclote District (northern Pinellas County and western Pasco County): Is named after the Anclote River and Anclote Key which mark the border between Pinellas and Pasco Counties. More than 65 Cub Scout Packs, Boy Scout Troops, and Venturing Crews serving areas including Oldsmar, Palm Harbor, Dunedin, Tarpon Springs, East Lake, Trinity, New Port Richey, Shady Hills, and Hudson.
- Miccosukee District (central Pinellas County): Is named after the Miccosukee, a Florida Native American tribe. More than 60 Packs, Troops, and Crews serving areas including Clearwater, Belleair, Pinellas Park, Seminole, Safety Harbor, and Largo.
- Skyway District (southern Pinellas County): Is named after the Sunshine Skyway Bridge that crosses the mouth of Tampa Bay. More than 60 Packs, Troops, and Crews serving areas including St. Petersburg, Tierra Verde, South Pasadena, St. Pete Beach, and Treasure Island.

== Camps ==
Its two main Scout camps were Sand Hill Scout Reservation in Spring Hill and Camp Soule in Clearwater. There was also a smaller facility at Bigfoot Wilderness Camp near Dade City.

== Order of the Arrow ==
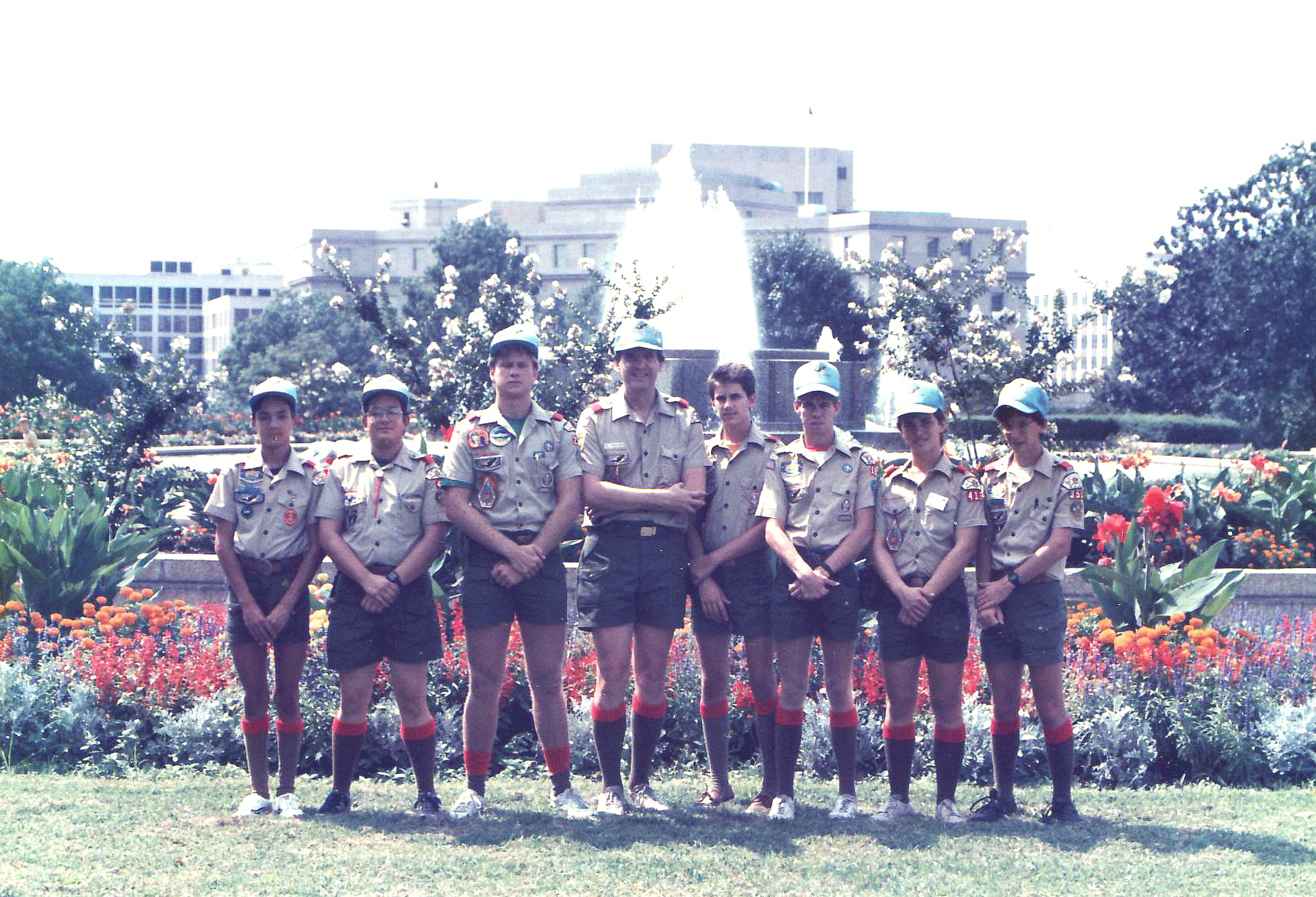
The Timuquan Lodge delegation in Washington, D. C., en route to the National Order of the Arrow Conference at Central Michigan University (1986)

The West Central Florida Council's Order of the Arrow Lodge was Timuquan Lodge, founded in 1946. The Order of the Arrow is Scouting's National Honor Society that recognizes youth and adult leaders who best exemplify the Scout Oath and Scout Law in their daily lives. The lodge was named in honor of the extinct Timucua Native American tribe of northern and central Florida. Timuquan Lodge hosted the S-4 OA Section Conference at Sand Hill Scout Reservation from April 17–19, 2009. Nearly 1,100 Scouts and leaders from throughout Florida and southern Georgia attended the event.

With the merger of the two councils in 2016, Timuquan Lodge joined the Gulf Ridge Council's Seminole Lodge to form the newly named Uh-To-Yeh-Hut-Tee Lodge.

== See also ==
- Scouting in Florida
