= Scouting in Kentucky =

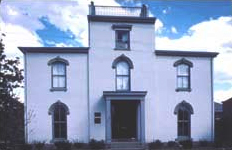
Daniel C. Beard Boyhood Home

Scouting in Kentucky has a long history, from the 1910s to the present day, serving thousands of youth in programs that suit the environment in which they live. Kentucky has a very early Scouting heritage, as the home state of Daniel Carter (Uncle Dan) Beard.

== Early history (1908–1950) ==
Burnside, in south-central Kentucky, is believed to be home to the first Boy Scout troop in the United States. In 1908, two years before the Boy Scouts of America was officially organized, Mrs. Myra Greeno Bass organized a local troop of 15 boys, using official Boy Scout materials she had acquired from England. A sign at the edge of town declares Burnside "Birthplace of Boy Scouts in America", and an official state historical society marker commemorates the troop. Burnside is now part of the Blue Grass Council.

Boy Scouts of America Troop 1 in Frankfort, Kentucky was established in 1909 by Stanley A. Harris. There has been a long-standing belief that this was the very first Boy Scout troop in the United States. However, Troop 1 was originally formed under the British Boy Scouts and the charter was destroyed in a fire around 1920. Nonetheless, Troop 1 is still active and is sponsored by the First Christian Church of Frankfort, Kentucky.

Troop 1 in Paducah, Kentucky was established in early 1911, during the inaugural year of the Boy Scouts of America. Originally organized by Reverend Clinton S. Quin (the troop's first scoutmaster), Troop 1 has been continuously chartered by Grace Episcopal Church since 1911 and has claim to being one of the ten oldest, continuously chartered Troops in the United States. A mural on Paducah's flood wall was dedicated to the Troop in honor of its centennial anniversary on February 6, 2011. Troop 1 is currently organized within the Lincoln Heritage Council.

Outside of Frankfort, in towns like Danville, Kentucky in Boyle County, 3 new troops organized in December 1911. Troop 1, Christian Church with nelson Rodes as Scoutmaster, Troop 2, Centenary Methodist Church with Sandridge as Scoutmaster, and Troop 3, Presbyterian Church, no Scoutmaster listed. Of these, Troop 1 continues today as Troop 326 and Troop 2 continues today as Troop 27.

In addition, small councils began in a number of places, with the Issac Shelby Area Council that was made up of Mercer, Boyle, and Jessamine Counties, with and the Daniel Boone Council of Winchester, Kentucky and the Frankfort Council. These were among the councils who merged to create the Blue Grass Council in 1927 in Lexington, Kentucky.

Kentucky also claims an early unofficial girl's scouting group (Campfire Girls were one of three groups as affiliated girl's version of Boy Scouts at the time. "Girl Scouts" formed March 1912 by Juliette Gordon Low in Savannah, GA and years later they could not work out a deal to merge with the Campfire Girls. Campfire Girls (1) A group called "Girl Scouts," that had been organized in 1910 in Des Moines, Iowa, by Clara A. Lisetor-Lane; (2) A group called "Girl Guides," that had been sponsored in 1910 by the Rev. David Ferry of Spokane, Washington; (3) Camp Fire Girls, which had been announced in April 1911 in New York..), an 8 girl patrol of Boy Scout Troop #17 in Louisville in July 1911. The first official troops was formed in 1917 in Scottsville.

In 1914, the BSA gave local councils the power to ban African Americans from Scouting. In 1922, the BSA revised that ban and allowed local Councils to create "shadow Councils" for their black and other racial/ethnic minorities. Until 1974, some southern councils of the Boy Scouts of America were still racially segregated. (The Old Hickory Council in North Carolina did not integrate until 1974.) The Louisville Area Council, headquartered in Louisville, was the first BSA local Council to develop such a "shadow Council" and board members of that "inter-racial council" were permitted to serve on the Louisville Area Council's board without vote. The BSA's "inter-racial council" program ended in 1954; Louisville accepted their first black Boy Scout Troops in 1959; and their first black Cub Scout Packs in 1963.

Most Girl Scouts of the USA units were originally segregated by race according to state and local laws and customs. By the 1950s, the GSUSA began significant national efforts to desegregate the camps and maintain racial balance. One of the first desegregations was Camp Shantituck in Kentucky, which was accomplished by Murray Walls in 1956.

== Scouting in Kentucky today ==
There are six BSA local councils in Kentucky. Two councils are headquartered in Kentucky (Blue Grass and Lincoln Heritage). The other four councils are headquartered in neighboring states (Ohio, West Virginia, and Tennessee). All of Kentucky lies within the Eastern Region of the BSA.

=== Blue Grass Council ===
- Elkhorn District
- Lake Cumberland District
- Lonesome Pine District
- Mountain Laurel District
- Palisades District (formed by combining Henry Clay District with part of Midland Trails and part of the former Wilderness Trail District)
- Shawnee District (Former Midland Trails District)

=== Buckskin Council ===
The Buckskin Council serves Scouts in Scouts in Kentucky, Ohio, Virginia and West Virginia.

=== Dan Beard Council ===
The Dan Beard Council serves Scouts in Ohio and Kentucky. The Council underwent a realignment in June 2006. Several districts were combined.

=== Lincoln Heritage Council ===
The Lincoln Heritage Council serves 64 counties in four states: Kentucky, Indiana, Illinois, and Tennessee.

=== Middle Tennessee Council ===
Covers parts of Trigg and Christian Counties that are part of Fort Campbell, KY.

=== Simon Kenton Council ===
In the 1990s, the BSA went through a restructuring in an attempt to reduce manpower, and in several states small historic Councils were merged into a larger supercouncil. The new Simon Kenton Council, serving Ohio and Kentucky, is an example of such a supercouncil.

Includes Kentucky County: Greenup.

== Girl Scouting in Kentucky ==
Map of Girl Scout Councils in Kentucky

There are two Girl Scout councils in Kentucky.

=== Girl Scouts of Kentuckiana ===
Girl Scouts of Kentuckiana serves nearly 20,000 girls in 64 counties in western Kentucky, southern Indiana, and South Fulton in Obion County, Tennessee.

The Girl Scouts of Tulip Trace Council recently dissolved, with Girl Scouts of Kentuckiana gaining 4 counties in southern Indiana.

Headquarters: Louisville, Kentucky
Website: Girl Scouts of Kentuckiana

Camps:

- Camp Barren Ridge is 220 acres (0.89 km^{2}) near Glasgow, KY
- Camp Bear Creek is 183 acres (0.74 km^{2}) on Kentucky Lake in Marshall County, KY
- Camp Pennyroyal is 180 acres (0.73 km^{2}) in Utica, Kentucky
- Camp Shantituck is 112 acres (0.45 km^{2}) in Shepherdsville, KY
- Camp Twin Ridges is 40 acres (160,000 m^{2}) in Vine Grove, KY
- Camp Whippoorwill is 107 acres (0.43 km^{2}) in Madison, Indiana
- Houchens Program Center is 12 acres (49,000 m^{2}) on Barren River near Bowling Green, KY
- Stem Adventure Center is 1,400 acres (5.7 km^{2}) on the Ohio River near Laconia, IN

=== Girl Scouts of Kentucky's Wilderness Road Council ===
Kentucky's Wilderness Road Council serves 25,000 Girl Scouts in 67 Central and Eastern Kentucky counties and Lawrence County, Ohio.

Headquarters: Lexington, Kentucky
Website: Girl Scouts of Kentucky's Wilderness Road

Camps:

- Camp Cardinal in Carter County, Kentucky

Camp Cardinal is 156 acres situated on the mountain ridgelines in eastern Kentucky, within a short hiking distance of Carter Caves State Resort in Carter County. The camp has 4 platform tent units, a small house, a Dining Hall, hiking trails and programming facilities. Commercial caving, swimming and miniature golf is available at Carter Caves State Resort for a fee.

- Camp Judy Layne in Morgan County, Kentucky

Camp Judy Layne is situated in Morgan County, which covers an area of 180 acres of woods inside the Daniel Boone National Forest, adjacent to Cave Run Lake. The facilities at Camp Judy Layne include a swimming pool with slides, a climbing tower, a zip line, low ropes course, and hiking trails.

- Camp Richard Clark in Clark County, Kentucky

Camp Richard Clark is 110 acres located in Clark County, Kentucky. Perhaps the most historic of all the councils' camp properties, Camp Richard Clark is located where a grand hotel with mineral springs operated as a health spa that attracted many patrons from all over the nation in the 1850s. Its history; seclusion and pleasantly unusual terrain make this site an interesting place to visit. Overnight capacity is up to 200, limited by restroom facilities.

- Camp Shawano in Fayette County, Kentucky

Set on the bluffs above the Kentucky River, Camp Shawano is the camp in the heart of the Bluegrass. 146 acres of cedar and hardwood forest and a number of open meadows provide sites for outdoor games.

== See also ==
- List of Eagle Scouts (Boy Scouts of America)
