= Scouting in Nevada =

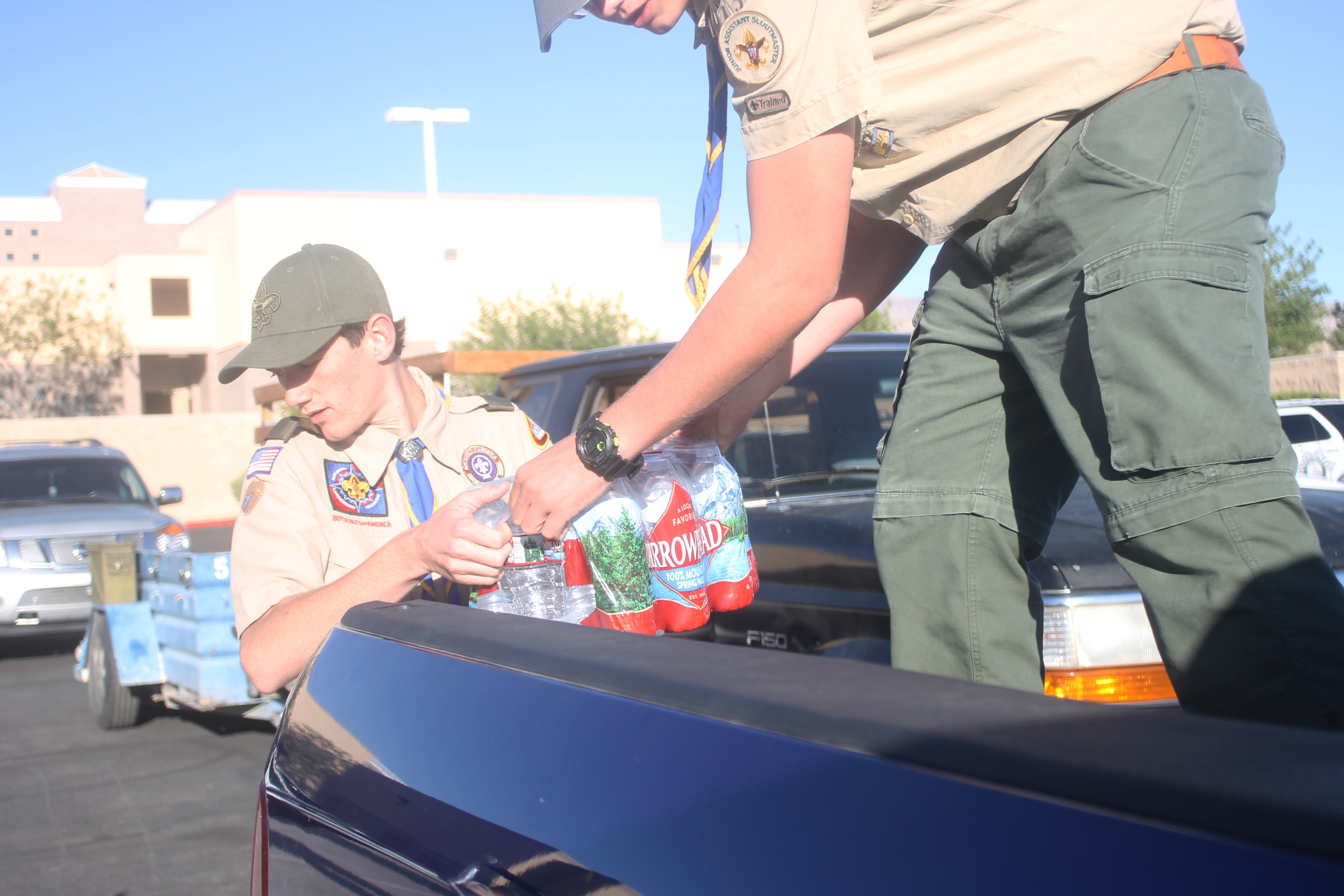
- Boy Scouts in Las Vegas

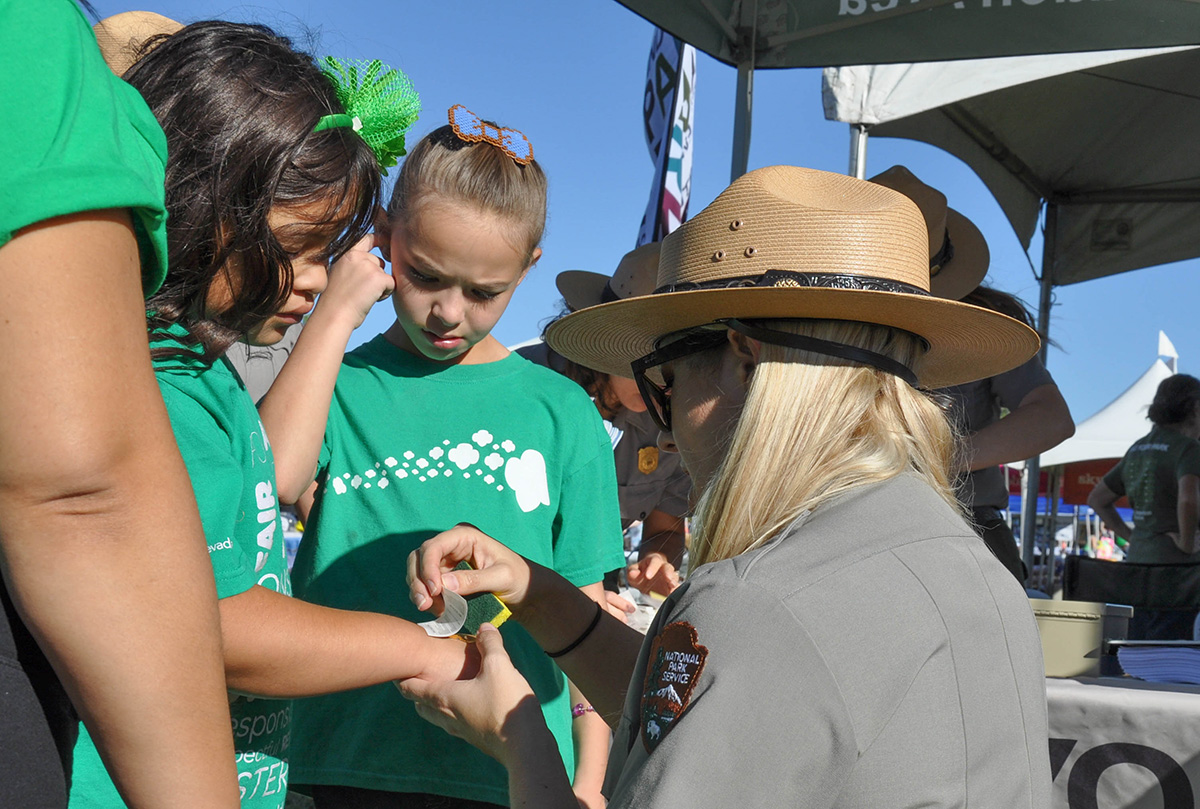
- Girl Scouts in Nevada

Scouting in Nevada has a long history, from the 1910s to the present day, serving thousands of youth in programs that suit the environment in which they live.

== Early history (1910-1950) ==
The first Girl Scout troop in Nevada was formed in Boulder City, Nevada on April 15, 1932.

== Boy Scouts of America in Nevada today ==
There are 2 Boy Scouts of America (BSA) local councils in Nevada.

=== Las Vegas Area Council ===
Las Vegas Area Council (#328)
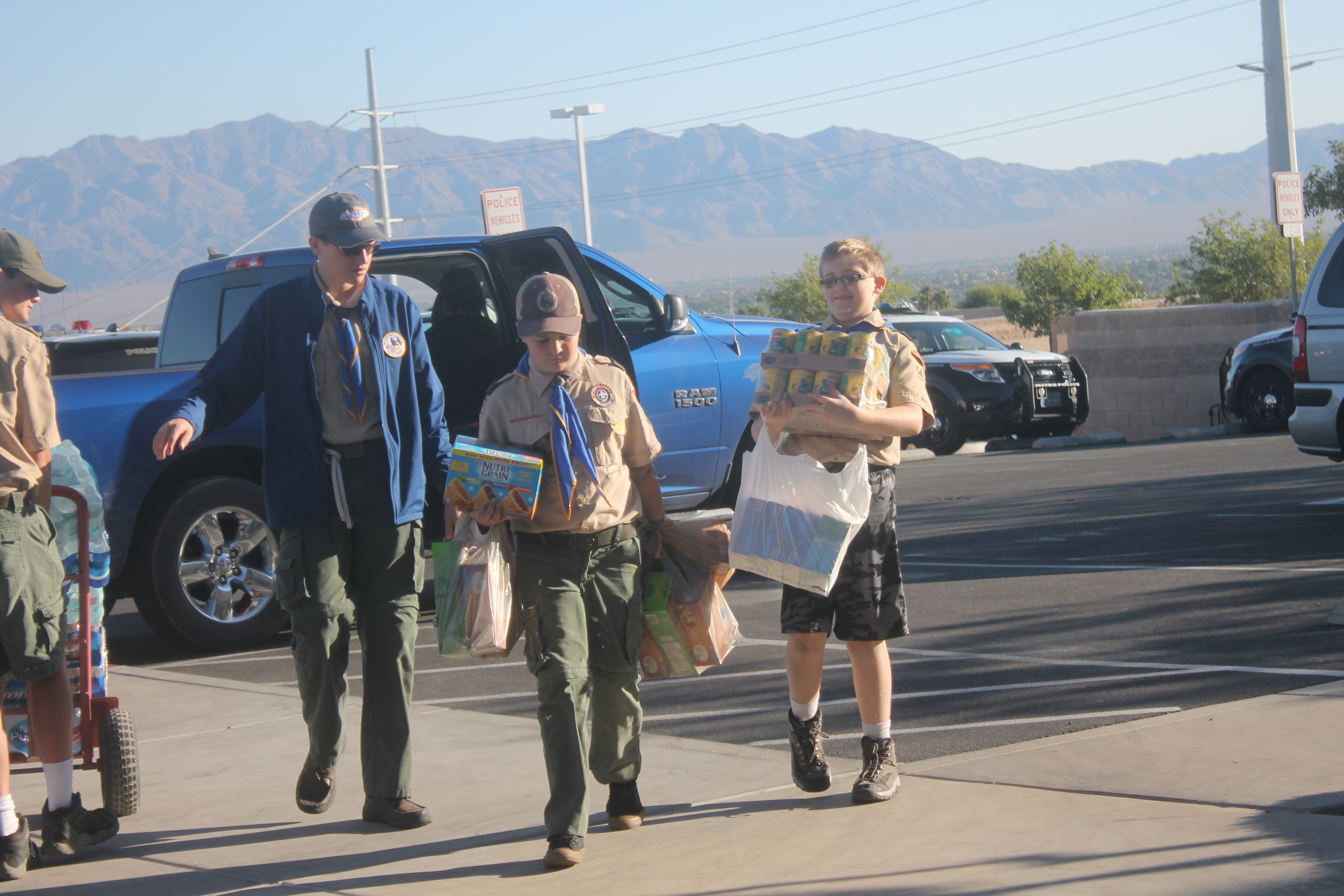
- Owner: Boy Scouts of America
- Headquarters: Las Vegas, Nevada
- Country: United States
- Founded: 1944
- Website lvacbsa.org

Formerly the Boulder Dam Area Council, the Las Vegas Area Council serves Scouts in Nevada, California and Arizona. The Boulder Dam Area Council was started in 1944 with fewer than 500 youth. The former council offices were in cramped spaces on the UNLV campus, but in 2002 they moved into the new facility, the Donald W. Reynolds Scouting Resource Center. The name of the council was changed to Las Vegas Area Council in 2005. It currently serves youth in Clark and Nye counties of southern Nevada, southeastern California, and western Arizona.

==== Districts ====
- Anasazi District
- Bighorn District
- El Dorado District
- London Bridge District
- Mohave District
- North Star District
- Silverado District
- Spring Mountain District
- Sunhawk District

==== Council Camps ====
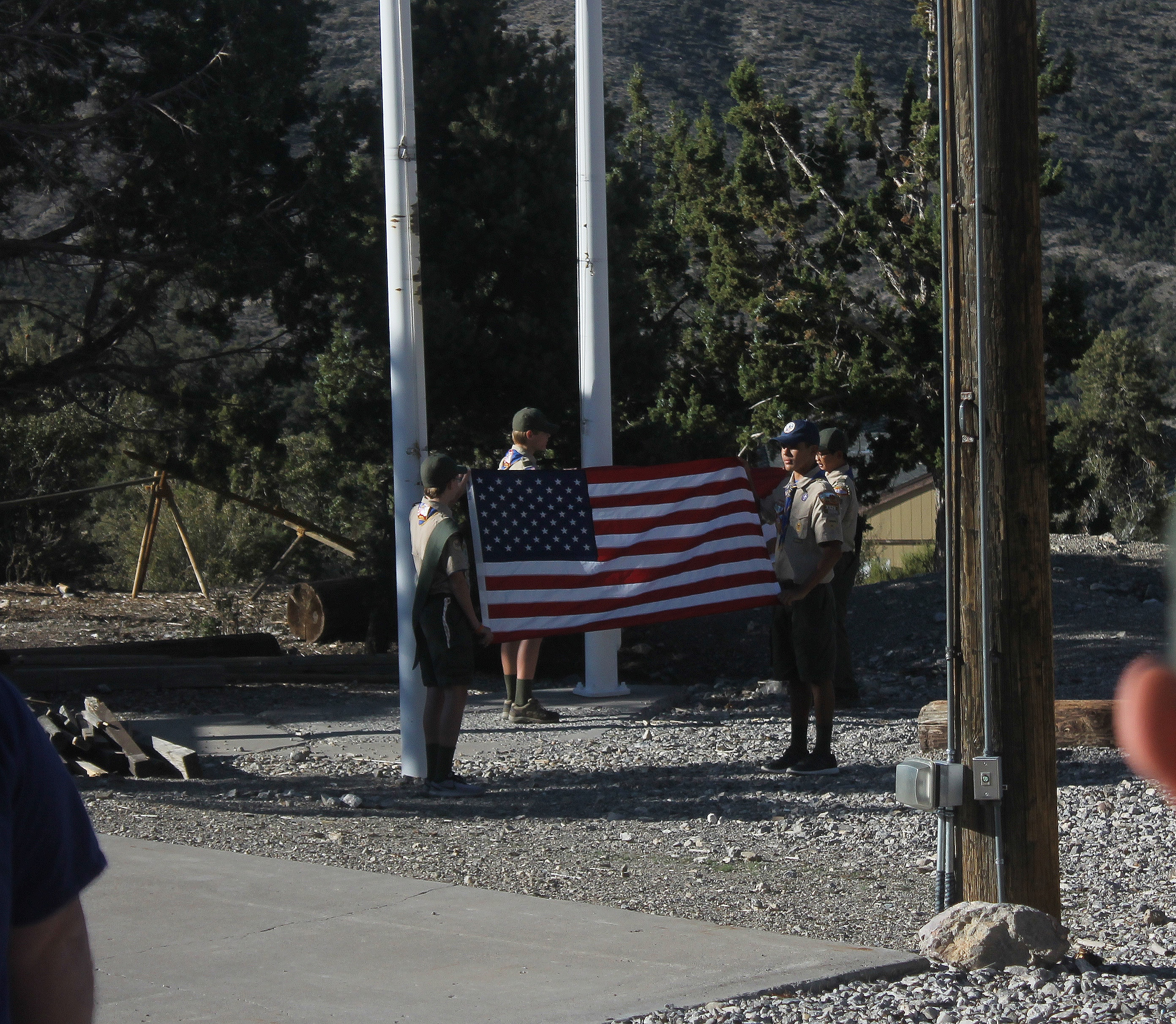
Boy scouts of Las Vegas Area Council Troop 430 raising the American Flag at Spencer W. Kimball Scout Reservation

- Spencer W. Kimball Scout Reservation—located at the base of Mount Potosi about 35 minutes southwest of Las Vegas, named after Spencer W. Kimball
- Del Webb High Adventure Base—located in the pines and aspens above Kolob Reservoir and Zion National Park in southern Utah
- Camp Levi-Levi—located in the Hualapai Mountains southeast of Kingman, Arizona

==== Order of the Arrow ====
- Nebagamon Lodge #312

=== Golden Empire Council ===
Golden Empire Council serves Scouts in California and Nevada.

=== Nevada Area Council ===
Nevada Area Council #329
- Owner: Boy Scouts of America
- Headquarters: Reno, Nevada
- Country: United States
- Website nevadaareascouting.org

Nevada Area Council serves 14,500 youth as of December 2006

in northern Nevada and northeastern California. Headquartered at 500 Double Eagle Ct., Reno, Nevada.

==== Districts ====
- Great Basin District
- Sierra Nevada District
- Zephyr District
- Scoutreach Division

==== Council Camp ====
The council currently does not operate a camp. Camp Fleischmann near Chester, California in the Lassen National Forest was heavily damaged in 2021 by the Dixie Fire. The council decided to permanently close the camp with a final farewell celebration in July, 2025.

==== Order of the Arrow ====
Tannu Lodge 346 is the Order of the Arrow Lodge for the Nevada Area Council. Headquartered in Reno, Nevada, it spans from eastern California to Elko, Nevada.

===== History =====
In 1946 the Nevada Area Council chartered the Wiyaka Lodge, Order of the Arrow, to replace the Tribe of Nacopen as the council's Honor Camper Society. "Wiyaka", the Sioux word for feather, was chosen by camp director Larry Lake and was used as the Lodge name until 1961. In 1961, after a rather stagnant period, the lodge underwent a period of restructuring, and a new name and totem were deemed in order. The Pronghorn Antelope was chosen as the new totem and "Tannu", the Shoshone-Paiute word for antelope or deer became the new lodge name.

During the 1960s the lodge grew in membership, and, as one of the larger Lodges in the old Area 12-C, we hosted the Area 12-C Conference at Galena Creek. As the Lodge prospered, its ability to fulfill its mission in promoting Scout camping grew as well. In 1972 the Lodge earned the E. Urner Goodman Camping Award for excellence in promotion of its camping program. During the mid-1970s the lodge experienced another downswing in membership and activity but rebounded under new leadership toward the end of the decade.

In 1974 the Lodge hosted the W3B Conclave at Sky Tavern. In 1982 it received the E. Urner Goodman Award for the second time, a feat considered quite rare. In 1986 Tannu Lodge hosted the Section W3B Conclave at Stead, Nevada. In 1996, it hosted the Section W3B Conclave at Naval Air Station Fallon and celebrated its 50th anniversary.

In 2005, Ross Armstrong from Tannu Lodge served as Western Region Chief for the Order of the Arrow. He received the Distinguished Service Award at the 2006 National Order of the Arrow Conference. In 2010, Armstrong publicly came out as gay and wrote about the BSA's need to end the ban on gay Scouts and Scouters.

Tannu Lodge is a part of Section W-3B, which spans from Eureka down to Bakersfield, California.

=== Snake River Council ===
Snake River Council serves Scouts in Idaho, Nevada, and Utah.

== Girl Scouting in Nevada ==
Girl Scouts of Nevada
- Map of Girl Scout Councils in Nevada

Four Girl Scout Councils serve Nevada. However Girl Scouts of Utah serves only the town of West Wendover, Nevada which is adjacent to Wendover, Utah.

=== Girl Scouts of Southern Nevada ===
Girl Scouts of Southern Nevada (formerly Frontier Council) serves more than 10,000 girls and adults in southern Nevada (Clark, Esmeralda, Lincoln, and Nye counties) and the southern part of Inyo County, California.

Council office in Las Vegas, Nevada
Web Site:www.girlscoutsnv.org

Camps and houses:

- Camp Foxtail, opened in 1949, is 15 acres (6.1 ha) located at 8,500 feet (2,600 m) in the Spring Mountain Range in Toiyabe National Forest near Las Vegas.
- Calico Basin is a 30-acre (12 ha) day use area in Red Rock Canyon National Conservation Area
- Boulder City Girl Scout House
- Henderson Girl Scout House

=== Girl Scouts of the Sierra Nevada ===
Serves some 6,700 girls in northern Nevada and all or part of ten eastern California counties (see Scouting in California). The council was established in 1936 with a membership of 52 girls and 12 adults.

Council office in Reno, Nevada
Web Site: www.gssn.org

Field Office:

- Elko, Nevada

Camps and Houses

- Camp Wasiu II is 45 acres (18 ha) in Tahoe National Forest, California
- Elko Girl Scout House in Elko, Nevada
- Winnemucca Scout house in Winnemucca, Nevada
- Bishop Girl Scout house in Bishop, California

=== Silver Sage Girl Scout Council ===
Silver Sage serves, in northern Nevada, the Duck Valley Indian Reservation, which straddles the Idaho/Nevada border, in northwestern Elko County.

== Scouting museums in Nevada ==
- Las Vegas International Scouting Museum, Las Vegas, Nevada

== See also ==
- Portal:Scouting
