= Scouting in Florida =

Scouting in Florida is composed of Boy Scouts of America (BSA) and Girl Scouts USA (GSUSA) local councils in Florida. Scouting in Florida has a long history, from the 1910s to the present day, serving thousands of youth in programs that suit the environment in which they live.

== Early history (1910-1950) ==
In 1914, the BSA gave local councils the power to ban African Americans from Scouting. Until 1974, some southern councils of the Boy Scouts of America were still racially segregated.

== Boy Scouts of America in Florida today ==
There are nine BSA local councils in Florida. In addition, the Florida National High Adventure Sea Base of the BSA is located in Islamorada, Florida.

=== Alabama-Florida Council ===
Alabama-Florida Council serves Scouts in Alabama and Florida, with the council office located in Dothan, Alabama.

OA Lodge: Cowikee Lodge #224

=== Central Florida Council ===
Central Florida Council serves Scouts in Orange, Osceola, Seminole, Lake, Brevard, Volusia and Flagler Counties. Its headquarters is located in Apopka, Florida, and its primary Scout camp is Camp La-No-Che in Paisley.

OA lodge: Tipisa Lodge 326

=== Greater Tampa Bay Area Council ===
Greater Tampa Bay Area Council
- Owner: Boy Scouts of America
- Headquarters: Tampa, Florida
- Country: United States
- Founded: 5/01/2016
- President: Peter Collins
- Scout Executive: Mike Butler (eff March 1, 2022)

The Greater Tampa Bay Area Council is the newest council in Florida and was formed by a merger of Gulf Ridge Council and West Central Florida Council on May 1, 2016.

The Greater Tampa Bay Area Council serves youth in Citrus, Hardee, Hernando, Highlands, Hillsborough, Pasco, Pinellas, Polk, and Sumter counties. The four main Scout camps are Camp Brorein in Odessa, Camp Soule in Clearwater, Flaming Arrow Scout Reservation in Lake Wales, and Sand Hill Scout Reservation in Brooksville. There are also two smaller facilities at Bigfoot Wilderness Camp near Dade City, and Camp Alafia in Lithia. The Scout office is in Tampa.

OA Lodge: Uh-To-Yeh-Hut-Tee Lodge 89

=== Gulf Coast Council ===
Gulf Coast Council (Florida)
- Owner: Boy Scouts of America
- Headquarters: Pensacola, Florida
- Country: United States
- Website http://www.gulfcoastcouncil.org/

Gulf Coast Council serves Scouts in Florida and Alabama, with the council office located in Pensacola, Florida. The council's name refers to the Gulf Coast of the United States.

==== Organization ====
The council is administratively divided into 4 districts:

- Long Leaf Pine District - serving the Conecuh, Escambia, and Monroe Counties in Alabama.
- Choctawhatchee District - serving the Okaloosa and Walton Counties in Florida.
- Pensacola Bay District - serving the Escambia and Santa Rosa Counties in Florida.
- Lake Sands District - serving the Bay, Gulf, Holmes, and Washington Counties in Florida.

==== Camps ====
In 1961, the Spanish Trail Scout Reservation (STSR) was founded in the Gulf Coast Council. STSR is one of the largest Scout reservations in the southeast. It offers a full range of facilities including: a 40-acre (160,000 m^{2}) lake for swimming, canoeing, and fishing; a dining hall; and many places to camp. There are two camps on the STSR, Camp Euchee and Camp Jambo, each with full camping facilities.

Gulf Coast Council #773 serves Scouts in Florida and Alabama, with the council office located in Pensacola, Florida. The council's name refers to the Gulf Coast of the United States. Its camp is Spanish Trail Scout Reservation in DeFuniak Springs, Florida.

==== Order of The Arrow ====
OA lodge: Yustaga Lodge #385 whose patches can be seen here.

Yustaga Lodge is the Order of The Arrow associated with the Gulf Coast Council.

Yustaga Lodge was founded in 1948 thanks to the foresight and efforts of Ted Childress and Norman Savelle, Field Scout Executives of the Gulf Coast Council. That year, a chief and eleven braves from Alibamu Lodge #179 of the Tukabatchee Area Council of Montgomery, Alabama visited the Gulf Coast Council's Camp Big Heart on May 21–22, 1948, where they bestowed the title of Honor Camper and Order of the Arrow member upon 24 Scouts and Scouters.

The name Yustaga comes from a small but powerful Florida tribe that was a part of the Creek nation. Translated, the words mean “Drinkers of the Fire Water”.

As of May 2025, Yustaga Lodge host 4 Chapters:

- Appalachee Chapter - Serving Arrowmen in Washington, Holmes, Bay, and Gulf Counties.
- Choctaw Chapter - Serving Arrowman of Walton and Okaloosa Counties.
- Oschambos Chapter - Serving Arrowmen in Conecuh, Monroe, and Escambia (AL) Counties.
- Woapalanne Chapter - Serving Arrowmen in Santa Rosa and Escambia (FL) Counties.

=== Gulf Stream Council ===
Gulf Stream Council is in southeast Florida with the headquarters in Palm Beach Gardens. The council serves youth in the eastern portion of South Florida from the Broward/Palm Beach line north to the Brevard/Indian River County line and west into the eastern portions of Highlands, Glades and Hendry counties.

OA Lodge: Aal-pa-tah Lodge 237

=== North Florida Council ===
The North Florida Council encompasses the 17 counties of northeast Florida. Through almost 7,000 volunteers the council serves over 57,000 youth in over 850 units. The North Florida Council owns, maintains and operates two camps: St. Johns Riverbase at Echockotee on Doctors Lake in Orange Park, and Camp Shands near Hawthorne.

OA Lodge - Echockotee Lodge

=== South Florida Council ===
South Florida Council
- Owner: Boy Scouts of America
- Country: United States
- Scout Executive: Jeff Berger

The South Florida Council, is in South Florida in Broward, Miami-Dade, and Monroe Counties. It has 3 camps: Camp Elmore in Davie, Camp Sawyer in the Florida Keys, and Camp Everglades in Everglades National Park.

OA Lodge: O-shot-caw Lodge 265

=== Southwest Florida Council ===
Southwest Florida Council
- Owner: Boy Scouts of America
- Country: United States

Southwest Florida Council serves Collier, Lee, Charlotte, Manatee, Sarasota, and parts of DeSoto and Hendry counties. It has 2 properties: the Price-Sanders Scout Reservation in Charlotte with the Dr. Franklin Miles Camp and Camp Gannett, and Camp Flying Eagle in Manatee.

"The Southwest Florida Council was chartered in July 1969, and based on membership and units, it ranks 46th out of 306 councils in the United States. The Southwest Florida Council is a geographic area divided into four districts that include Charlotte, Collier, DeSoto, Hendry, Lee, Manatee, Sarasota Counties. The Council has an executive board of volunteers and a staff of professionals."

"The Council accomplishes its mission by making its program available to chartered organizations; existing organizations that have compatible goals. These groups include religious, educational, civic fraternal, business, labor, and governmental bodies. The Council supports chartered organizations by providing materials and certain facilities, such as camps. The Chartered Organizations organize the packs and troops." (Source — SWFL Council Website)

Recent Highlights

In 2007 The Southwest Council:

Awarded Centennial Council for achieving excellence in providing a quality program to a growing youth population in Southwest Florida Recognized as a National Quality Learning for Life Council Achieved 11 consecutive years of membership growth Serves over 32,000 boys and girls, in Charlotte, Collier, DeSoto, Hendry, Lee, Manatee and Sarasota Counties Had 117 young men attained the rank of Eagle Scout Has 4,000 active volunteers and over 390 units engaged in the program Increased attendance at: merit badge camp-outs, summer day-camps, camporees and at the Philmont Scout Reservation Almost 15,000 campers used our two camp facilities including special needs youth and community groups provided over 15,000 community service hours Collected almost 100,000 lb (45,000 kg) of food through the Scouting For Food Campaign Represented by 12 Scouts and Scout Leaders at the World Jamboree in London, England The Friends of Scouting fundraising campaign netted the largest amount in the Council's history Achieved a balanced budget Youth sold over 7,700 cases of popcorn at a retail value of over $480,000 Of that, 1,600 cases were shipped to deployed troops in over 40 countries

Council Website

OA Lodge: Osceola #564, website

=== Suwannee River Area Council ===
Suwannee River Area Council
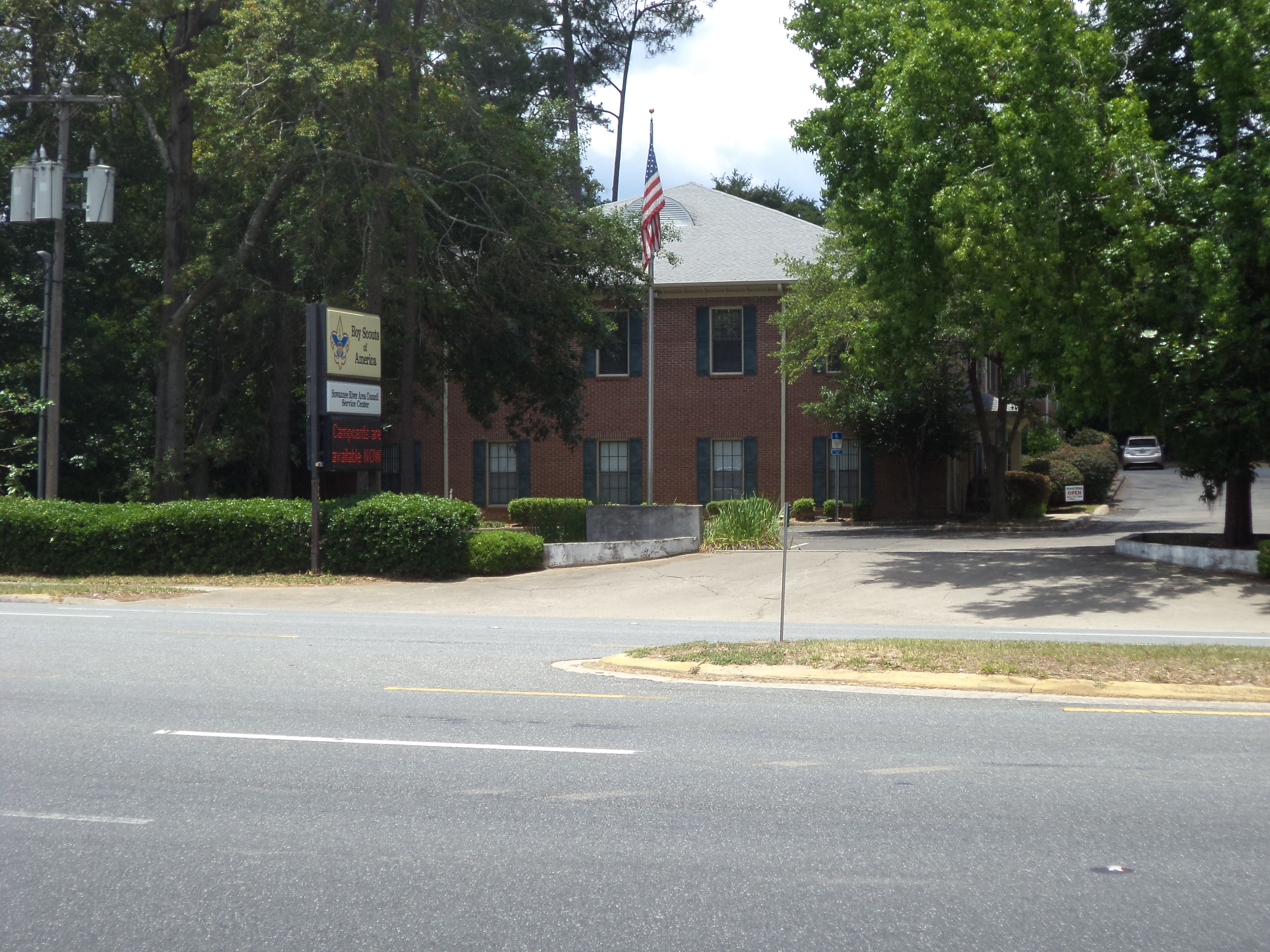
- Owner: Boy Scouts of America
- Country: United States
- Founded: 1924

The Suwannee River Area Council, active from 1924 to present, encompasses 13 counties in north Florida and south Georgia. The Council Service Center and central headquarters are in Tallahassee, Florida. Since opening in 1924, the Suwannee River Area Council has offered traditional Scouting programs at several camps.

==== Camps ====
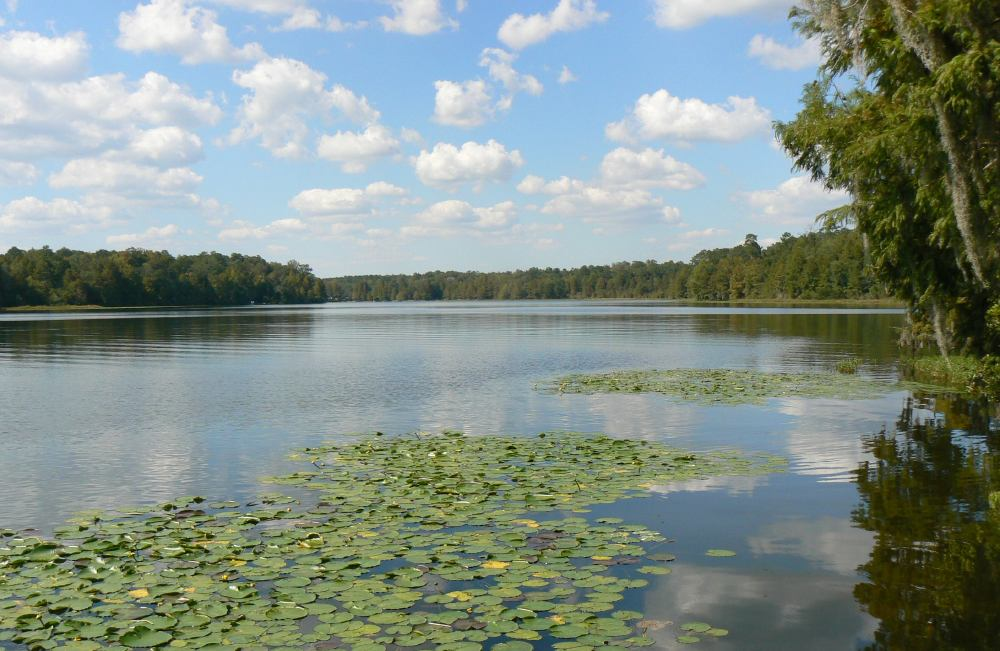
Lake Talquin, as viewed from Wallwood Scout Reservation on the north shore, looking to the southwest, October 2007.

The first was Camp Orchard Pond, located near Tallahassee. Orchard Pond was a small camp, having only four campsites during its entire lifetime. It was used from 1927 to 1947, when it was sold. The council moved its summer camp operations to Camp Semialachee, located on the west side of Moore Lake south of SR 20 on the Silver Lake Road west of Tallahassee. Semialachee got its name indirectly from the union of "Seminole" and "Apalachee", two primary groups of Native Americans in the United States from the north Florida region. Camp Semialachee was kept until 1965, when camping was moved to Wallwood Scout Reservation, located just south of Quincy, Florida. The land for the new camp was donated by Dr. Charlie K. Wall and his wife Margaret as a gift to Scouting. The buildings and equipment were donated by various community leaders, Scouters, and organizations. The dedication of Wallwood came in 1964, the buildings were constructed in 1965, and the first camping season was the summer of 1966. Wallwood covers over 500 acres (2.0 km^{2}) of land bordered on one side by a branch of Lake Talquin. The camp offers a variety of Scouting programs, including COPE, as well as opportunities for other civic organizations. There are currently two camping facilities at the Wallwood Reservation - Camp Nea Mathla and Camp Tom Matherly.

==== Order of the Arrow ====
The Semialachee Lodge #239 serves the council.

== Girl Scout of the USA in Florida today ==
Girl Scouting in Florida
- Map of Girl Scout Councils in Florida

Six Girl Scout councils exist in Florida.

=== Girl Scouts of Citrus Council ===
Girl Scouts of Citrus Council serves over 17,000 girls in Brevard, Lake, Orange, Osceola, Seminole and Volusia counties in central Florida. It was established in 1956.

Headquarters: Orlando, Florida
Website

Camps

- Celia Lane Little House in Orlando.
- Mah-Kah-Wee Program Center is 250 acres (100 ha) near Chuluota.
- Riverpoint Program Center is 24 acres (9.7 ha) with a 19th-century lodge
- Melbourne Scout House

=== Girl Scouts of Gateway Council ===
Girl Scouts of Gateway Council serves nearly 6,200 girls in 35 northern Florida counties (Alachua, Baker, Bay, Bradford, Calhoun, Clay, Columbia, Dixie, Duval, Escambia, Flagler, Franklin, Gadsden, Gilchrist, Gulf, Hamilton, Holmes, Jackson, Jefferson, Lafayette, Leon, Levy, Liberty, Madison, Nassau, Okaloosa, Putnam, Santa Rosa, St. Johns, Suwannee, Taylor, Union Wakulla, Walton, and Washington).

Headquarters: Jacksonville, Florida
Website

Camps:

- Camp Kateri is 550 acres (220 ha) and two lakes in Hawthorne, Florida
- Camp Kugelman in Lillian, Alabama
- Fernandina Beach Little House in Fernandina Beach, Florida

=== Girl Scouts of Gulfcoast Florida ===
Girl Scout programs were first established in Gulfcoast Florida in the mid-1920s. In 1962, the Caloosa Girl Scout Council, made up of Lee, Collier, and one-half of Hendry Counties, merged with the Gulfside Council (Manatee and Sarasota Counties) and incorporated independent troops in Charlotte County and DeSoto County, to form the Gulfcoast Council. The Council's name was changed to Girl Scouts of Gulfcoast Florida, Inc. in 1993, with expansion to cover ten counties and nearly 10,000 square miles. Today, Girl Scouts of Gulfcoast Florida serves 7,000 girls across Manatee, Hardee, Highlands, Sarasota, DeSoto, Charlotte, Glades, Lee, Hendry, and Collier Counties.

Headquarters: Sarasota, Florida
Website

Camps:

- Camp Honi Hanta (Bradenton)
- Camp Caloosa (North Fort Myers)

=== Girl Scouts of Southeast Florida ===
A new council formed by the merger of Girl Scouts of Broward County and Girl Scouts of Palm Glades Council.

Headquarters: Jupiter, Florida; Oakland Park, Florida
website

==== Camps ====
Camp Welaka is a 640-acre (260 ha) camp in Jonathan Dickinson State Park in Tequesta. Facilities are provided for daytime and Troop/Group Camping for all age levels. A full-time camp ranger is on site. Camp Welaka facilities include a combination of both platform tent and cabin sites. A lodge is available for activities. There are 3 platform tent sites with 8 tents each sleeping 4. An additional platform tent site has 4 tents each sleeping 4. Cabins are available at 2 sites with 6 cabins each sleeping 4. Also, a cook's cabin, a double-wide unit sleeping 14 is available. A Unit House is located at each site for eating and activities. An ADA accessible Bunk House may also be reserved.

Camp Nocatee just southwest of Clewiston is a 640-acre (260 ha) camp with a 13-acre (5.3 ha) lake, and a swimming pool. Facilities provide Troop/Group Camping for all age levels. A full-time camp ranger is on site. Camp Nocatee's facilities include a Camp Commons area that consists of Founder's Hall, an activity and dining center. It is equipped with a commercial kitchen. Only a certified food manager can use the commercial kitchen. There is also a Director's and a cook's cabin. In addition, an Arts and Crafts Center and Trading Post is on site. Camp Nocatee has six camp sites in all. For camp sites 1-5 there are 5 cabins per site each sleeping 8. Site 5 is ADA accessible. Tree Tops is site 6 – and has 3 cabins that are elevated on stilts each sleeping 8.

Camp Telogia a 13-acre (5.3 ha) camp situated in Parkland. Facilities are provided for daytime activities for Daisy's and daytime activities and Troop/Group Camping for all age levels. Camp Telogia has 2 platform tent sites and a Troop House. There are 9 platform tents sleeping 4 to a tent at one site and the other has 5 platform tents sleeping 4 each. Green Thumb, the Troop House, sleeps 20. Green Thumb is also ADA accessible. A day site is available for activities and can be used to pitch tents.

These camps offer a variety of activities such as Core Camps, canoeing, swimming, archery, hiking and more. Canoeing and swimming are not available at Camp Telogia.

=== Girl Scout Council of Tropical Florida ===
The Girl Scout Council of Tropical Florida serves some 16,000 girls in Monroe and Miami-Dade counties.

The first troop in Monroe was formed in 1921 and the first in Dade County in 1923. The council was chartered in 1929 and its founder was Judge Edith Atkinson.

website

==== Camps ====
Camp Wesumkee belongs to the Girl Scouts of the USA, and is part of the Girl Scout Council of Tropical Florida, serving Miami, Florida. It is located on West Summerland Key in the Lower Florida Keys, covering over 10 acres (4.0 ha) of Atlantic ocean front.

Camp Wesumkee is for experienced campers, offering opportunities for canoeing, snorkeling, sailing, windsurfing, and nature observations in tidal pools. There are fields for tent use, and 11 chickees with bunk beds for six people each. The chickees have screen walls with shades for privacy. The Galley and Wheelhouse have kitchens and dining/activity areas. There are also fire circles and picnic tables.

The camp hosts the Winter Star Party, usually in February, for amateur astronomers.

Hurricane Rita and Hurricane Wilma in 2005 both affected the camp. All structures were damaged to some degree, and storm surge left sand piled up across the camp. Hurricane Irma in 2017, landing just 8 miles away, similarly damaged the camp.

Camp Choee in Miami serves mainly as a day camp, though it has overnight capabilities, accommodating over 250 day campers across its 20 acres (8.1 ha). Facilities include a large air-conditioned building with kitchen, pool with bath house, craft lodge, fire circles, and four air-conditioned cabins. The original cabins were destroyed during Hurricane Andrew; the replacement cabins have their own toilets and showers, and house 16 people each. The camp is in a fairly urban location, and is made up of open grassy areas and pine scrub.

Camp Mahachee is located in a rich tropical hammock (ecology), and serves as both a day camp and an overnight camp. It covers over 11 acres (4.5 ha), has 8 cabins housing 10 people each, and areas for tents. There are also several fire circles, a butterfly garden, and a natural coral rock "maze."

Coral Gables Little House is on the register of historical places. It is located near Venetian Pool, and is used for day activities and meetings.

South Miami Little House is used for troop meetings and camping, accommodating 20 people overnight or 40 people for day activities. During the summer, the camp they run is called 'Camp Little House' and it is an 8-week summer program. They also have spring break camp (1 week) to attend.

=== Girl Scouts of West Central Florida ===
Girl Scouts of West Central Florida serves more than 28,000 girls in 8 Florida counties (Citrus, Hernando, Hillsborough, Marion, Pasco, Pinellas, Polk and Sumter). It is a new council formed by the merger of Heart of Florida Girl Scout Council and Girl Scouts of Suncoast Council.

In the 1960s the Suncoast Council established Camp Withlacoochee in the Withlacoochee State Forest.

Headquarters: Tampa, Florida
Website

== International Scouting units in Florida ==
Cuban Scouting in exile exists to this day in Miami as part of the Boy Scouts of America, where Cuban-American Scouts are instrumental in annual Lincoln-Martí celebrations.

== See also ==
- Scouting in Alabama
- Scouting in Georgia
