= Scouting in Indiana =

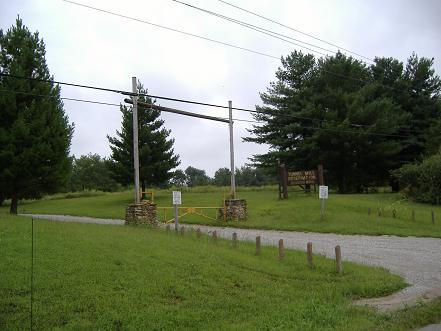
- Tunnel Mill Entrance

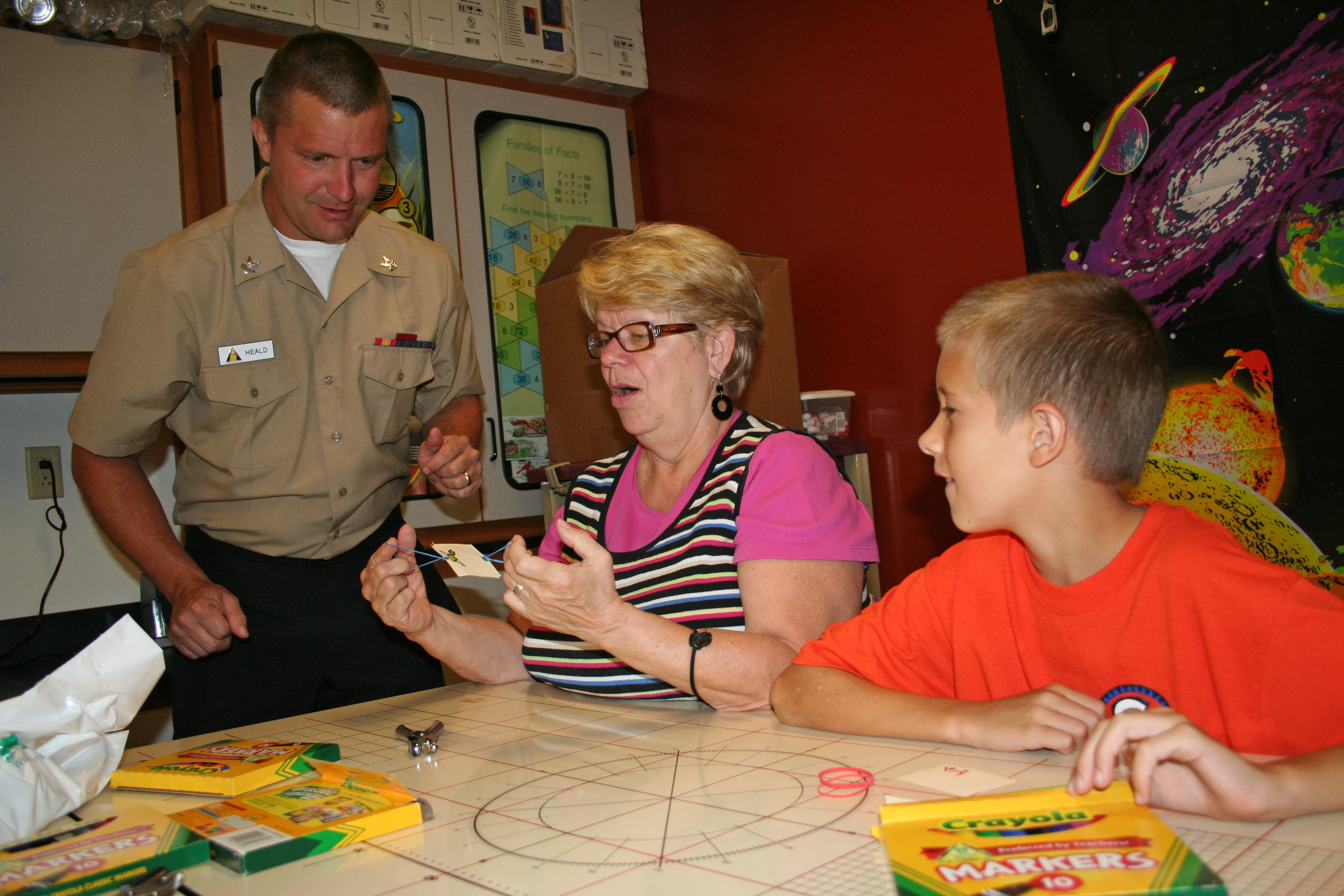
- Camp Dellwood Girl Scout Camp Science Center

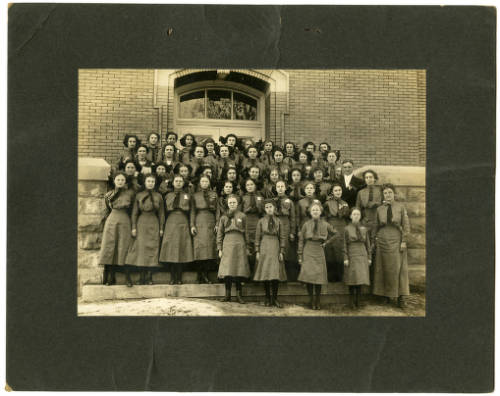
Crothersville Girl Scouts

Scouting in Indiana has a long history, from the 1910s to the present day, serving thousands of youth in programs that suit the environment in which they live.

== Early history (1910-1950) ==
Indianapolis is home to Troop 9, founded by "Chief" Francis Obed Belzer in 1910, one of the first Scout troops in America.

Belzer founded Firecrafter at Camp Chank-Tun-Un-Gi (now called Camp Belzer) in the summer of 1920. Belzer also served as the first Scout Executive for the Indianapolis Council, later known as the Central Indiana Council, and again to the Crossroads of America Council.

The first National Order of the Arrow Conference was held at Indiana University in 1948.

== Recent history (1950-2010) ==
In 1950, 1956, 1961, 1965, 1969, 1990, 2002, 2009 and 2018, the National Order of the Arrow Conference (NOAC) was held at Indiana University in Bloomington, the most frequent venue for the event. In 1994, NOAC was held at Purdue University in West Lafayette, Indiana.

== Boy Scouts of America in Indiana today ==
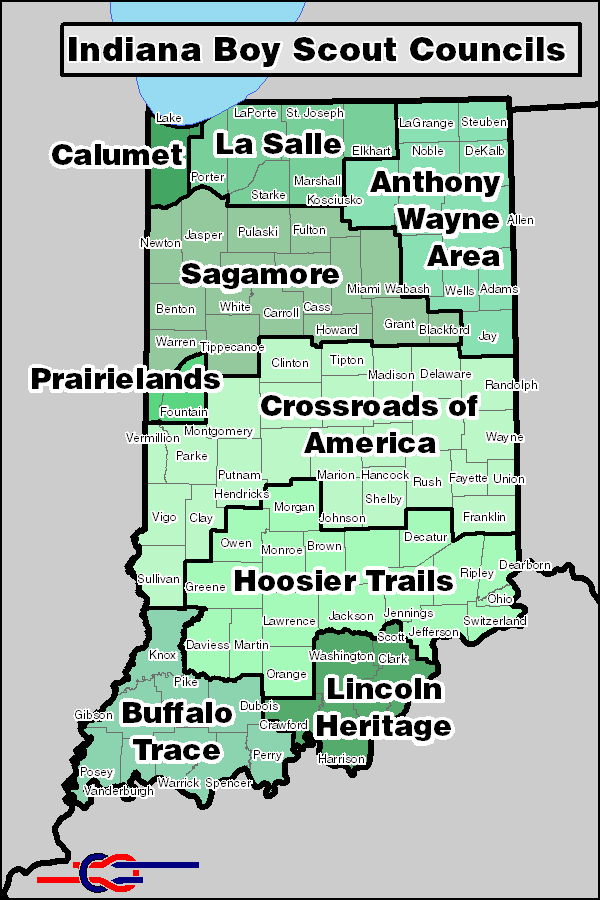
BSA Councils serving Indiana.

There are nine Boy Scouts of America (BSA) local councils in Indiana. All of Indiana lies within Central Region, except for Clark, Scott, Floyd, Harrison, Crawford, and Washington counties, as part of Southern Region.

=== Anthony Wayne Area Council ===
Based in Fort Wayne, Indiana and covering 11 counties in Northeast Indiana — Adams, Wells, Jay, Huntington, Allen, DeKalb, LaGrange, Noble, Steuben, Whitley, Kosciusko.

- Lincolnway District (Whitley and Kosciusko Counties)
- Pokagon District (DeKalb, LaGrange, Noble, Steuben)
- Three Rivers District (Learning for Life)
- Summit District (within 469)
- Wabash Valley District (Adams, Huntington, Jay, Wells)

Features Anthony Wayne Scout Reservation with Camp Chief Little Turtle

==== Anthony Wayne Scout Reservation ====
The Anthony Wayne Scout Reservation is a Scouts BSA camp located near Ashley, Indiana, United States.

The reservation has three key areas: Camp Chief Little Turtle (CCLT), Camp Foellinger, and Camp Wilderness.

- Camp Chief Little Turtle is the main camp. It has many activity centers, such as a waterfront, handicraft, outdoor skills, Project C.O.P.E., and other typical features of a Scouts BSA camp.
- Camp Foellinger is used mainly for special events, such as Cub Scout camp, National Youth Leadership Training, and Order of the Arrow events.
- Camp Wilderness contains the Jack Zeiger Ropes Course — used for C.O.P.E. and rock climbing — and Orion, an area used for camping and wilderness survival training.

=== Buffalo Trace Council ===
The Buffalo Trace Council is based in Evansville, Indiana. It serves southwestern Indiana and southeastern Illinois. Its affiliated Order of the Arrow lodge is Kiondaga Lodge. Troop 246 is primarily one of the more active units in the northern area of the council.

==== Camps ====
The Buffalo Trace Council has operated four camps throughout its existence, three of which are still in existence. Camp Arthur, located near Vincennes, opened in 1945 and was removed from the list of BSA-approved camping facilities for a time in the mid-1990s. Camp Carnes, located between Jasper and Dubois, has since changed ownership to the City of Jasper and is run as a park. Old Ben Scout Reservation (OBSR), located in Pike County, Indiana opened in 1985 on the site of an abandoned strip mine operated by the Old Ben Coal Company and was the council's primary summer camp location, until a lack of funding forced the council to cease having summer camps there. Camp Pohoka was the previous summer camp location, but was shut down when OBSR was opened.

==== Districts ====
===== Algonkian (formerly Three Rivers) =====
- Edwards County
- Gibson County
- Knox County
- Lawrence County
- Richland County
- Wabash County

===== Lincoln Heritage =====
- Dubois County
- Perry County
- Pike County
- Spencer County
- Warrick County (excluding the Newburgh area)

===== Native Trails =====
- Gallatin County
- Newburgh
- Posey County
- Vanderburgh County
- White County

=== Pathway to Adventure Council ===
Pathway to Adventure Council is based in Chicago, Illinois and covers much of its metro area, including the north-west corner of Indiana.

=== Crossroads of America Council ===
Headquartered in Indianapolis, Indiana, the Crossroads of America Council (BSA Council #160) serves Scouts and Scouters in Central Indiana. It was initially formed when Central Indiana Council, Delaware County Council, Kikthawenund Council, and Whitewater Valley Council merged in 1972.

=== Hoosier Trails Council ===
Hoosier Trails Council
- Owner: Boy Scouts of America
- Location: Bloomington, Indiana
- Country: United States
- Scout Executive: Randy Saunders
- Website www.hoosiertrailsbsa.org

The Hoosier Trails Council, BSA serves in 18 counties in south-central Indiana, and to more than 6,000 youth each year.

==== History ====
The Hoosier Trails Council is the result of several council mergers.

In 1921, the Bartholomew County Council (#150) was founded. During the late 1920s, it merged into the Hoosier Hills Area Council (#150), founded in 1928.

In 1928 the Lost River Area Council was founded. In 1931 it was absorbed into the White River Area Council (#145), founded in 1927.

In 1973, White River and Hoosier Hills merged to form the Hoosier Trails Council (#145).

==== Organization ====
- Muscatatuck District (Hoosier Hills District and Lenni Lenape District merged in 2019) serving Dearborn, Jefferson, Ohio, Ripley, Switzerland, Bartholomew, Jackson, Decatur, & Jennings Counties
- Wapehani District (Miami District and Valley Trails District merged in 2008) serving Brown, Monroe, Morgan & Owen Counties
- White River Trails District (Lincoln Trails District and Southern Trails District merged in 1990) serving Lawrence, Orange, Martin, Daviess, & Greene Counties

==== Camps ====
Resident summer camp is held at Maumee Scout Reservation, located on Lake Tarzian in the Hoosier National Forest. Maumee first opened in 1972 for White River Council as a replacement for its previous camp, Camp Wapehani in Bloomington, Indiana which had been divided by a recent re-alignment of State Road 37. The 640 acres (260 ha) property is near in Norman, Indiana. Lake Tarzian is named after Sarkes Tarzian who led the capital campaign to build the camp.

Until 2023, the council also possessed Camp Louis Ernst in Dupont. Louis Ernst was founded in 1928 and operated by Hoosier Hills Council until its merger with White River Council to form Hoosier Trails Council in 1973. After this, Louis operated as a summer camp until 1983 when it was reduced to primitive camping. The camp was officially transferred to a group known as the Friends of Camp Louis Ernst in 2023.

==== Order of the Arrow ====
Nischa Chuppecat Lodge (#212) is Hoosier Trails' Order of the Arrow Lodge. It was founded in 1973 as the merger of Wazi Yata (#290) and So-Aka-Gha-Gwa (#212) lodges.

Both So-Aka-Gha-Gwa and Wazi Yata can trace back their heritage to other organizations separate from the Order of the Arrow.

The predecessor to So-Aka-Gha-Gwa, the Order of The Golden Arrow, was founded at Cataract Falls in the late 1930s and became So-Aka-Gha-Gwa Lodge in 1941.

The predecessor to Wazi Yata, the Order of the Wazi Yata, was founded at Camp Louis Ernst in 1934 and became Wazi Yata Lodge in 1945.

Nischa Chuppecat and So-Aka-Gha-Gwa have collectively hosted the National Order of the Arrow Conference (NOAC) at Indiana University eleven times as of the summer of 2018, the most of any lodge in the nation.

=== La Salle Council ===
La Salle Council (#165)
- Owner: Boy Scouts of America
- Location: South Bend, Indiana
- Country: United States
- Scout Executive: James Hulgan
- Website www.lasallecouncilbsa.org

La Salle Council serves Scouts in Indiana and Michigan.

==== Districts ====
- Algonquian District
- Dunes Moraine District
- Pioneer Trails District
- Potawatomi District

==== Camps ====
- Wood Lake Scout Reservation
  - Camp Tamarack is approximately 250 acres and is the summer camp facility located on the north side of Big and Little Wood Lake. Tamarack has 17 campsites, 3 winter lodges, 18 staff cabins, shower house, health lodge, director's lodge, dining hall, cook's cabin, quartermaster building, trading post, administration building, conservation pavilion, rifle range, archery range, waterfront, athletic field, and parade field.
  - Camp Will Welber is approximately 10 acres and is used as a training area. This camp is located on the south side of Big Wood Lake. Facilities consist of a storage building, central shower, and two staff cabins.
  - Camp Dan Beard and Jim Bridger are located on the south side of Big Wood Lake and are approximately 80 Acres each. These are both Leave No Trace camping areas. They offer no amenities, except for their abundant natural beauty.
- Camp Topenebee
- Rice Woods Camp

=== Lincoln Heritage Council ===
Lincoln Heritage Council (#205)
- Owner: Boy Scouts of America
- Headquarters: Louisville, Kentucky
- Country: United States
- Founded: 1993
- Scout Executive: Jason Pierce
- Website www.lhcbsa.org

The George Rogers Clark Council was formed by Scouts of Clark, Floyd, Harrison, Crawford, Scott, and Washington counties in 1927, and merged with Old Kentucky Home Council in 1993 to form the Lincoln Heritage Council, which serves Scouts in Kentucky and Indiana. The Council absorbed the Shawnee Trails Council of western Kentucky (and part of southern Illinois and northwestern Tennessee) in April 2012 to serve scouts in Indiana, Kentucky, Illinois, and Tennessee.

==== John Work House and Mill Site|Tunnel Mill Scout Reservation ====
Tunnel Mill Scout Reservation is a camp just outside Charlestown, Indiana, owned by the Lincoln Heritage Council. In 1917 local Troop 3 decided to use the property as a summer camp, as it would for three summers. The George Rogers Clark Council shortly after 1927 bought Tunnel Mill from the Murphy family, who had bought the property the previous year but lost interest after a mill fire. In 1933 the three-sided wooden Pioneer Village cabins were built. In 1942 the Scoutmaster's Cabin and Evergreen cabins were completed. In 1950 the McDonald Bridge was completed across Fourteen Mile Creek. The camp saw its greatest use in the 1950s and 1960s, with 564 Scouts, the highest attendance ever, in 1960. In 1969 the swimming pool was built, to replace the creek, now-unsafe for swimming. By the 1980s the lessening attendance made the future of the camp uncertain. When the George Rogers Clark Council, which owned the property, merged with Old Kentucky Home Council, one of the conditions was that Tunnel Mill would not be closed. Since 1993 the camp has been used primarily by Cub Scouts and for winter camping. The property includes a cabin village, a swimming pool, and a dining hall built in 2000. The new dining hall replaced the one from the 1980s that once served as a steakhouse in Jeffersonville.

On November 6, 1996, Andy Campbell, a ranger serving as Tunnel Mill's caretaker, was shot to death by Roger Caldwell, "a diagnosed, paranoid schizophrenic" who trespassed onto the property while drunk. This was the first such incident in the history of Scouting. Campbell was able to drag himself 50 feet (15 m) to call 911. After police arrived on the scene to get information about the drunk from Campbell, they found Caldwell wandering on Indiana Highway 62. Caldwell was sentenced to 70 years in prison, with parole possible after 31 years.

=== Prairielands Council ===
Prairielands Council, previously the short-lived Illiana Council, has its headquarters in Champaign, Illinois, and also serves Scouts in Indiana.

=== Sagamore Council ===
The Sagamore Council was founded in 1973 by a merger of the Three Rivers Council (Headquarters in Logansport, IN), Mesingomesia Council (Headquarters in Marion, IN) and the Harrison Trails Council (Headquarters in Lafayette, IN). The council offices were eventually consolidated to a single office in Kokomo, Indiana. The council maintains two camps: Camp Cary, (near Lafayette, IN) used as a Cub Scout day camp and Camp Buffalo, (near Buffalo, IN - north and east of Indiana Beach) used as a Scouts BSA summer camp. The camp properties of Green Hills and Crossland were sold. Camp Green Hills was south and west of Lafayette, IN. Mesingomesia Council's Crossland Scout Reservation near Columbia City, Indiana was sold to the Indiana Department of Natural Resources in 1992 and is now called the Deniston Resource Area (named after a fallen DNR Conservation Officer). The camp was located on Robinson Lake, one of the last natural lakes in Indiana with almost no development. This was due in large part to the camp which encompassed almost three-fourths of the shoreline.

A few things make Sagamore Council unique:

1. Purdue University, in West Lafaytte, IN, hosted the 1994 National Order of the Arrow Conference.
2. Weaver Popcorn (which markets Trail's End Popcorn) is produced in Van Buren, Indiana.
3. Ramsey Popcorn (which markets Campmasters Popcorn) is produced in Ramsey, Indiana.
4. George O. Crossland was a Scout Executive who served the prior Mesingomesia Council. He was known for more notable Scouting functions including creating an honorary that rivaled the Order of the Arrow—TI-PI-SA, the Order of the Red Lodge. Crossland Scout Reservation was named after him.

==== Districts ====
- North Star District, serving Cass, Fulton, Jasper, Newton, Pulaski & White counties
- Peshewa District, serving Blackford, Grant, Howard, Miami and Wabash counties
- Wabash Valley District, serving Benton, Carroll, Tippecanoe, Warren & Northern Fountain counties

==== Camps ====
The Sagamore Council currently operates two camps:

- Cary Camp- Lafayette, Indiana
- Camp Buffalo - Buffalo, Indiana

== Girl Scouting in Indiana ==
There are 5 Girl Scout councils that serve Indiana.

On August 26, 2006, Girl Scouts of the USA's (GSUSA) national board of directors voted to endorse a plan to realign 312 councils into 109 high-capacity, community-based councils. The new structure will make the most effective use of resources to better serve the local community and create more opportunities in Girl Scouting for even more girls. Girl Scouts of Central Indiana was the first Girl Scout council in the nation to complete the merger process.

=== Girl Scouts of Central Indiana ===
Formed by the merger of Girl Scouts of Hoosier Capital Council, Covered Bridge Girl Scout Council, Girl Scouts of Treaty Line Council, Girl Scouts of Sycamore Council, and Girl Scouts of Wapephani Council, and the addition of Howard and Carroll Counties from Girl Scouts of Tribal Trails Council.

Girl Scouts of Central Indiana serves over 36,000 girls in 45 counties in Central Indiana. Council headquarters is Indianapolis, Indiana but service centers remain in cities that were the headquarters of former councils

Web Site: Official website

==== Camps and cabins ====
- Camp Sycamore Valley near Lafayette is 160 acres (0.65 km^{2}) on Wildcat creek.
- Camp Na Wa Ka in Poland, Indiana is 259 acres (1.05 km^{2})
- Camp Gallahue in Morgantown
- Camp Dellwood in Indianapolis
- Camp Ada in Spiceland

=== Girl Scouts of Greater Chicago and Northwest Indiana ===
See Scouting in Illinois for more information. The former Scouts of The Calumet Council and Drifting Dunes Girl Scout Council became part of this council.

=== Girl Scouts of Kentuckiana ===
See Scouting in Kentucky for more information. Serves many counties in southern Indiana

=== Girl Scouts of Northern Indiana-Michiana ===
This is a new council includes more than 18,240 Girl Scouts in northern Indiana (Adams, Allen, Cass, DeKalb, Elkhart, Fulton, Huntington, Kosciusko, LaGrange, LaPorte, Marshall, Miami, Noble, Pulaski, St. Joseph, Starke, Steuben, Wabash, Wells, and Whitley) and two counties, Berien and Cass, in southwest Michigan.

Formed by the merger of Indiana Lakeland Girl Scout Council, Girl Scouts of Limberlost Council, Girl Scouts of Singing Sands Council (except for a part that joined Girl Scouts Heart of Michigan), and Girl Scouts of Tribal Trails Council (except for a part that joined Girl Scouts of Central Indiana).

Website: Official website

==== Camps ====
- Camp Logan - 220 acres (0.89 km^{2}) near Syracuse, Indiana
- Camp Shawadasee — near Lawton, Michigan
- Camp Singing Hills - 240 acres (0.97 km^{2}) near Middlebury, Indiana
- Camp Soni Springs - 156 acres (0.63 km^{2}) near Three Oaks, Michigan
- McMillen Program Center - 103 acres (0.42 km^{2}) in northeast Indiana
- Wildwood Program Center - 40 acres (160,000 m^{2}) in Logansport, Indiana

=== Girl Scouts of River Bluffs Council ===
Headquarters is Glen Carbon, Illinois

website: Official website

=== Girl Scouts of Western Ohio ===
Headquarters is Cincinnati, Ohio

website: Official website

See Scouting in Ohio for more information

=== Girl Scouts of Southwest Indiana ===
Headquarters is Evansville, Indiana. It serves Vanderburgh, Warrick, Spencer, Perry, Posey, Gibson, Martin, Pike, Daviess, and Dubois Counties in Indiana and White County in Illinois.

website: Official website

Located in south-west Indiana and also a small part of Illinois. It was formed after a previous realignment in September 1957.

==== Camps ====
- Camp Koch in Cannelton, Indiana
- Carmi Little House in Carmi, Illinois
- Camp Three Lakes

Camp Koch has a sycamore that is a "Moon tree"; as a seed it was on the Apollo 14 mission to the Moon.

== See also ==
- Edwin C. Metcalfe
- Michikinikwa
