= Scouting in Alabama =

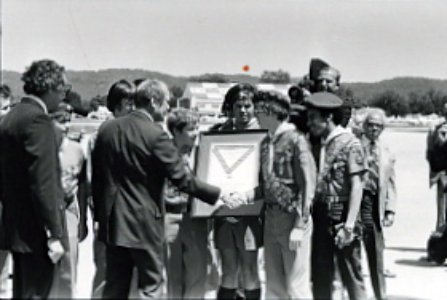
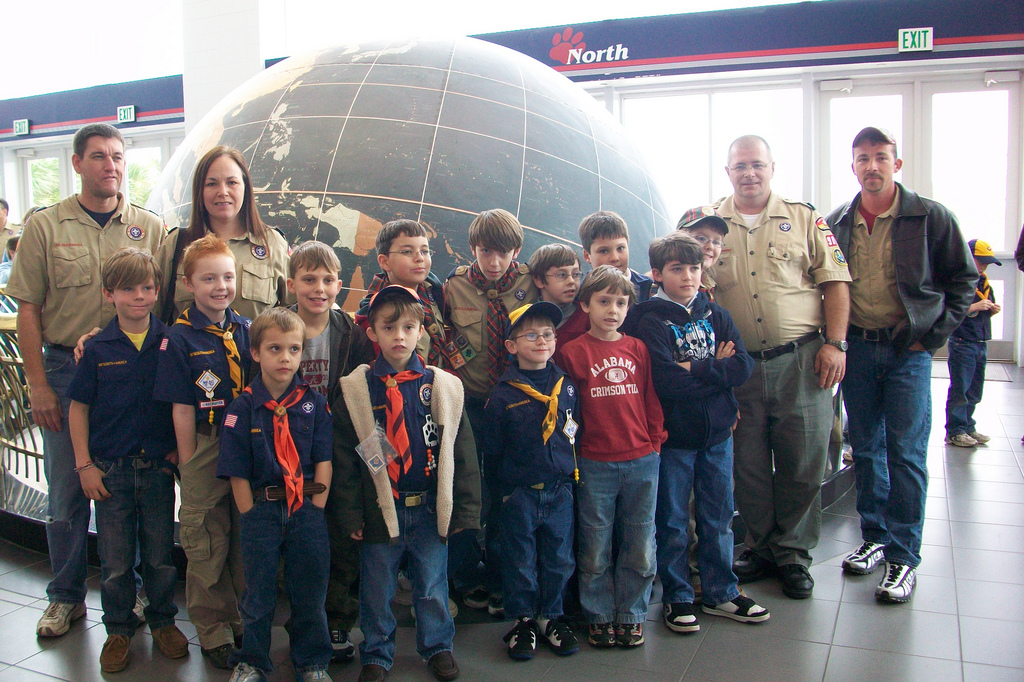

Scouting in Alabama has a long history, from the 1910s to the present day, serving thousands of youth in programs that suit the environment in which they live.

== Early history (1910-1950) ==
In 1918 a council was formed in Selma, only to be dissolved in 1920. That area would be served later by the Tukabatchee Area Council.

Until 1948, some councils of the Boy Scouts of America (BSA) were racially segregated. The National Office began a program of integrating local councils in 1940, which was largely complete in 1948.

== Recent history (1950-1990) ==
Circa 1960, the BSA renumbered all local Councils in alphabetical order by state and headquarters city. That numbering system remains in use today. In this sequence, Council "Number 1" (not the 'oldest BSA Council') was the Council originally was called the Choccolocco Council that was headquartered in Anniston, Alabama. That Council, combined with two others, now forms the Greater Alabama Council, headquartered from Birmingham, Alabama.

== Scouts BSA in Alabama today ==
In the 1990s, the Boy Scouts of America went through a restructuring in an attempt to reduce manpower, and in several states small historic Councils were merged into a larger supercouncil. The new Greater Alabama Council is an example of such a supercouncil. There are eight BSA local councils serving Scouts in Alabama today.

As of Feb 1, 2019, The "Boy Scouts" program under the Boy Scouts of America (BSA) changed its name to "Scouts BSA." This change was reflective of the organization's acceptance of girls as members of the program who wanted to experience the outdoor leadership program enjoyed by boys for over 100 years, including the coveted rank of Eagle Scout.

== Councils ==
=== Alabama-Florida Council ===
Alabama-Florida Council (#003)
- Location: Dothan, Alabama
- Country: United States
- Website www.bsa3.org

The Alabama-Florida Council serves Scouts in Alabama and Florida, with the council office located in Dothan, Alabama. It was founded in 1935 as the Southeast Alabama Council and changed its name in 1963 to its current name.

==== Organization ====
- Menawa District
- Muskoke District

==== Camps ====
- Camp Alaflo

==== Order of the Arrow ====
- Cowikee Lodge #224

=== Black Warrior Council ===
Black Warrior Council (#006)
- Location: Tuscaloosa, Alabama
- Country: United States
- Website www.bwc-bsa.org

The Black Warrior Council office is located in Tuscaloosa, Alabama, and the council's name refers to Chief Tuskaloosa whose name means Black Warrior.

In 1925, and again in 1932, the Walker-Lamar Council was formed in Jasper. In 1938 that council was reformed into the current Black Warrior Council.

==== Organization ====
- Chickasaw District - Tuscaloosa County, Pickens County, Bibb County and the City of Moundville
- Mountain District - Walker, Winston, Fayette, Lamar and Marion Counties
- Prairie District - Marengo, Sumter, Hale and Greene Counties

==== Camps ====
- Camp Horne
- Camp O'Rear
- White Bluff Scout Reservation

==== Order of the Arrow ====
- Aracoma Lodge #481

=== Chattahoochee Council ===
Chattahoochee Council serves Scouts in Georgia and Alabama, with the Council office located in Columbus, Georgia. The council's name refers to the Chattahoochee River, which flows through Georgia, Alabama, and Florida.

=== Choctaw Area Council ===
Choctaw Area Council serves Scouts in Mississippi and Alabama, with the council office located in Meridian, Mississippi. The council's name refers to the Choctaw nation.

=== Greater Alabama Council ===
Greater Alabama Council (#001)
- Location: Birmingham, Alabama
- Country: United States
- Website www.1bsa.org

The Greater Alabama Council is located in northern and central Alabama. The new council is a supercouncil. The council office is located in Birmingham, Alabama.

==== History ====
The Greater Alabama Council was formed by a merger of the Choccolocco Council, Tennessee Valley Council and the Central Alabama Council in 1998. The Choccolocco Council was formed in 1921. The Etowah County Council was formed in 1919 and changed its name to Northeastern Alabama in 1925; the council merged into Choccolocco in 1933. The Central Alabama council was formed as the Birmingham Area Council in 1915, changing its name in 1996. The Tennessee Valley Council was formed in 1924. Tennessee Valley absorbed Muscle Shoals Council in 1928 and the Andrew Jackson Council in 1930.

==== Organization ====
The Greater Alabama Council is divided into 13 districts:

==== Camps ====
Camp Westmoreland, a historic BSA summer camp located in Lauderdale County. This is one of the oldest operating camps in the Southeastern United States; it first opened in the 1920s. Camp Westmoreland ceased operations as a summer camp in the 1980s, but it is still widely used to this day for both council and district activities. Camp Westmoreland's old Order of the Arrow lodge was once home to Kaskanampo Lodge 310, which merged with Coosa Lodge 50 in the year 1999. Westmoreland District was once a part of the Tennessee Valley Council of the Boy Scouts of America before this council was merged with two other councils to form the Greater Alabama Council.

Camp Comer is located four miles South of Mentone, Alabama. According to "Mentone Alabama: A History" by Zora Shay Strayhorn:

"The land was purchased in 1962 and named after Hugh Ross Corner of Sylacauga, a longtime scout worker, who was serving as president of the Choccolocco Council at that time. M. M. Beck, council vice-president, suggested the name.

In 1965 a fund-raising campaign was successful in developing the lake and camping area. Stumps were removed from the lake and the dam was raised. The lake was named Lake Republic in honor of Republic Steel of Gadsden, a financial supporter of the camp.

On June 8, 1965, Camp Comer was officially opened. Work continued on the reservation and a year later 3,000 scouts and leaders attended camp."

Camp Sequoyah is nestled among 1,447 acres for woodlands in east central Alabama, near Cheaha State Park. It has been in operation since it was dedicated on June 29, 1972 and is a part of the Frank Spain Scout Reservation, which encompasses 1,447 acres.

==== Order of the Arrow ====
Coosa Lodge #50 is the Order of the Arrow lodge associated with the Greater Alabama Council. As of November 2011, the lodge has 12 chapters:

- Achunanchi Chapter, Choccolocco District
- Cahaba Chapter, Birmingham District
- Cheaha Chapter, Cheaha District
- Cherokee Chapter, Cherokee District
- Kaskanampo Chapter, Talakto District
- Koasati Chapter, Mountain Lake District
- Lookout Mountain Chapter, Lookout Mountain District
- Muscogee Chapter, Shelby District
- Nacha Sipo Chapter, Three Rivers District
- Nischamawat Chapter, Arrowhead District
- Nunne Hi Chapter, Vulcan District
- Yuchi Chapter, Westmoreland District

=== Gulf Coast Council ===
Gulf Coast Council serves Scouts in Florida and Alabama, with the council office located in Pensacola, Florida. The council's name refers to the Gulf Coast of the United States.

=== Mobile Area Council ===
Mobile Area Council (#004)
- Location: Mobile, Alabama
- Country: United States
- Website www.bsamac.org

The Mobile Area Council office is located in Mobile, Alabama. The council was formed in 1919 as the Mobile Council. It changed its name to Mobile Area in 1924. In 1926 the name was changed to Mobile and Baldwin Counties, and in 1927 changed back to Mobile Area.

==== Organization ====
- Baldwin District
- Five Rivers District

==== Camps ====
The council owns and operates one long term summer camp at the Maubila Scout Reservation. This also serves as unit camping, Cub Scout event and training facility. Camp Maubila has 680 acres (2.8 km^{2}) and a private lake.

==== Order of the Arrow ====
- Woa Cholena Lodge #322

=== Tukabatchee Area Council ===
Tukabatchee Area Council (#005)
- Location: Montgomery, Alabama
- Country: United States
- Website www.tukabatcheebsa.org

Formed in 1919 as the Montgomery Council, the council would change its name to Montgomery County in 1923, and then to Tukabatchee Area in 1946.

==== Organization ====
As of 2015, the Council consists of:

- Crane District
- Ecunchatee District
- Frontier District
- Muskogee District

In addition, the Council's Exploring program is considered a district for organizational purposes, though it consists solely of Exploring and Venturing units and not traditional Scouting Troops or Packs.

==== Camps ====
The council is home to two camps, both located on the 1000-acre Warner Scout Reservation in northeast Autauga County.

- Camp Tukabatchee opened in the summer of 2000 and currently serves as the primary facility for Boy Scout events.
- Camp Dexter C. Hobbs is built on the site of the original Camp Tukabatchee, and operates as a Cub Scout camp and family camp.

==== Order of the Arrow ====
The council's Order of the Arrow Lodge, Alibamu #179, was formally chartered in 1940 and is Alabama's oldest lodge. It is home to the Order of the Arrow's 1999 National Chief, Will Parker, and the 2007 National Vice Chief, Larry Newton. The lodge comprises 5 chapters, each corresponding to one of the council's districts:

- Cahaba Chapter, Crane District
- Chilitauga Chapter, Frontier District
- Cholocco Litabixie Chapter, College students and others living outside council boundaries
- Pinhoti Chapter, Muscogee District
- Towassa Chapter, Ecunchatee District

== Girl Scouting in Alabama today ==
There are two Girl Scout councils with headquarters in Alabama. In addition Girl Scouts of Historic Georgia serves Russell County, Alabama.

=== Girl Scouts of North-Central Alabama ===
Girl Scouts of North-Central Alabama
- Location: Birmingham, Alabama
- Country: United States
- Website girlscoutsnc.org

The Girl Scouts of North-Central Alabama Council serves over 3,500 girls. It owns and operates 4 camps. Camp Gertrude Coleman, established in 1925, is a 140-acre (0.57 km^{2}) site located east of Trussville on the Cahaba River in Jefferson County. Kanawahala Program Center (KPC) is a 600-acre (2.4 km^{2}) site with a 45-acre (0.18 km^{2}) lake, called Lake Alice. KPC is located in Shelby County. Camp Trico is a beautiful 109-acre (0.44 km^{2}) wooded lot on the shore of Lake Guntersville. Camp Cottaquilla is located in Calhoun County.

=== Girl Scouts of Southern Alabama ===
Girl Scouts of Southern Alabama
- Country: United States
- Website www.girlscoutssa.org

Girl Scouts of Southern Alabama covers 30 counties and serves over 9,000 girl members.

GSSA runs three campsites: Camp Scoutshire Woods, Camp Sid Edmonds and Kamp Kiwanis. There are two resident camps in the summer at Kamp Kiwanis and Camp Scoutshire Woods. Camp Scoutshire Woods is located on 56 acres (0.23 km^{2}) of rolling wooded hills about 30 miles (48 km) northwest of Mobile. Kamp Kiwanis is located on 110 acres (0.45 km^{2}) 45 minutes north of Montgomery, on Lake Martin. Both camps have boating and swimming areas.

There are two Service Centers. One is located in Mobile, the other in Montgomery and each has a shop.
