= Broad Creek Memorial Scout Reservation =

Sum of eight separate areas in Chesapeake Bay Watershed

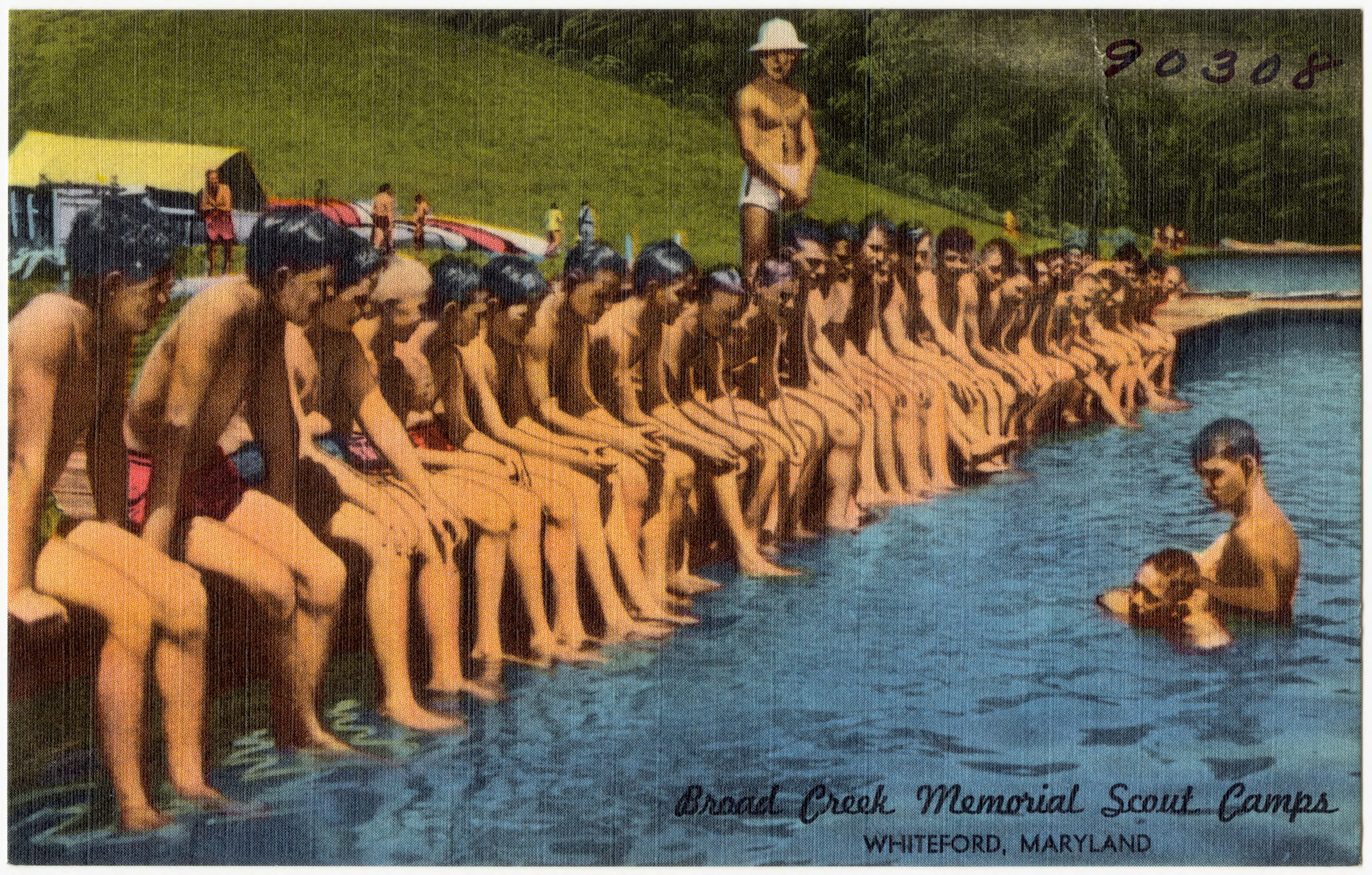
- Scouts swimming in the lake on a c. 1950 postcard

- Location within USA Maryland Broad Creek Location within Maryland Location within the United States
- Owner: Baltimore Area Council
- Location: 1929 Susquehanna Hall Rd; Whiteford, MD 21160
- Country: United States
- Coordinates: 39°41′24″N 76°15′54″W
- Camp size: 1,676 acres (6.78 km^{2})
- Founded: 1948
- Website broadcreekbsa.org

Broad Creek Memorial Scout Reservation, more commonly called just Broad Creek, is the sum of eight separate areas in the Chesapeake Bay Watershed. The reservation is 3 miles (4.8 km) from the Maryland and Pennsylvania border within Harford County, 25 miles (40 km) from the Maryland and Delaware border, and 28 miles (45 km) from Baltimore. The Camp Saffran component hosts summer camp, while Camp Oest is now often used for special events, such as Woodbadge and NYLT. During the non-summer season Camps Oest, Saffran, and Spencer are open for weekend tent and cabin camping. Five other less developed areas of the reservation, Camp Cone, Camp Finney, The Pines, The Hemlocks, and OA Hill, are used for outpost camping and hiking. The facilities at the reservation in 2012 were used by 36,000 youth, 17% of which were not affiliated with the Boy Scouts of America.

== History ==
The Baltimore Area Council acquired the first 45 acres of this camp on April 17, 1946 from W. David Terrell. It is now the fifth largest block of undeveloped land in the traditional Baltimore metropolitan area (after Aberdeen/Edgewater, Patuxent Wildlife Refuge, and parts of Gunpowder and Patapsco State Parks). The reservation's centerpiece, Lake Straus, was formed in 1948 as 55 acres (0.22 km^{2}) when Susquehanna River tributary Broad Creek was dammed. Later Saffran, Spencer, and Oest (then called Areas I, II, and III) each built piers on the lake. Spencer added an additional waterfront site on the narrow upper part of Lake Straus. In 1948 lodges and maintenance and administration buildings were added in Area I (Saffran). Canoe trips for older Boy Scouts were held as early as May 1954. In 1966 the Seabees completed a bridge across the Lake Straus dam. In June 1972 Hurricane Agnes overflowed the dam by 7 feet (2.1 m). Camp Spencer was closed for summer camp use after 2012. Spencer reopened in 2015 as a specialty resident STEM camp. That program moved to Camp Saffran just before the summer of 2017. In 2016 and 2017 Camp Spencer hosted a resident camp for the youngest youth called Cub Camp at Broad Creek. A total of 1624 acres of the reservation's 1676 acres have been permanently protected under a combination county, state, and federal conservation easements.

=== Hemlocks ===
The easternmost substantial hemlock forest in Maryland, home to the smokey shrew, is a 60 acres (0.24 km^{2}) old-growth hemlock forest with trees measured (by tree ring cores) up to 325 years old, located on both The Hemlocks area of the reservation and Conowingo Dam property. In 2005 area volunteers worked with state officials to study and reduce the destruction caused by an invasive species, the hemlock woolly adelgid. Since May 15-16, 2005, when the first 218 trees were treated, area youth volunteers have recorded data and marked trees while trained adult volunteers have injected imidacloprid into soil at the base of over 2000 hemlock trees. Trees closer to streams and wetlands have received trunk imidacloprid injections from Maryland Department of Agriculture staff. As a biocontrol remedy the Forest Service released over 2,300 Laricobius beetles into the forest. In 2013 the Forest Service reported that the "Laricobius beetles are spreading, the hemlock woolly adelgid is less prevalent, and the condition of the hemlock forest has noticeably improved."

=== Camp Cone ===
The southwest part of the reservation is named after the Baltimore Area Council's former Camp Cone where summer camp was held from 1945-47 and which was located near Glen Arm, Maryland. It is now part of Gunpowder Falls State Park.

=== Land patent ===
In 1632 Charles I of England granted Cecil Calvert, 2nd Baron Baltimore the land that is now Maryland in a charter. That charter land was divided by land patents. By the 19th century almost all land in Maryland had been so divided. In 2012 land surveyor Frank S. Richardson confirmed what had appeared on reservation surveys as "vacant land" since the 1940s that 19.014 acres (0.07695 km^{2}) used by the reservation for a universal access site and other campsites was apparently not a part of any existing patent or subsequent land acquisition. The Baltimore Area Council applied for a land patent to resolve the issue. On June 20, 2012 Governor Martin O'Malley signed a land patent granting the acreage to the Baltimore Area Council.

== Camp Saffran ==
=== Programs ===
Camp Saffran's summer camp includes a kayaking, canoeing, and sailing program on the nearby Susquehanna River, canoeing, backpacking, and Leave No Trace training at the reservation, BSA aquatics in three swimming pools, basketball, camp-wide campfires in an amphitheater enlarged and modernized in 2024, a tall climbing tower, conservation and nature programs, cooking, an Eagle summit program (Eagle Scout required merit badges), ecology programs, family nights, a first year camper program, fishing, a handicraft program, merit badge counseling, mile swim qualifying, patrol awards, Scoutcraft, a STEM program, shooting sports, stand-up paddleboarding, themed camp-wide games, volleyball, and wilderness survival.

=== Facilities ===
Campsites have canvas wall tents, each with two cots. Each campsite has picnic tables, a bulletin board, a flagpole, and a group pavilion. Some campsites have lodges equipped with a full kitchen that includes a stove, hot water, refrigerator, bunks, and electricity and can support 24 to 40 people. Some campsites have a pavilion and an Adirondack shelter with a cooking space and electricity and can support 16 to 24 people.

While the Nentico Pavilion dining hall serves cafeteria style meals, Camp Saffran in summer also offers groups the option to prepare food from their own supplies at a reduced fee. Other facilities include an archery range, dam, a family cabin area, the Jacobs Health Lodge, a parade ground, several ranger's houses, shotgun and rifle ranges, the Rosenberg Welcome Center, a large maintenance shop and "quartermaster" supply building, a skeet range, a stock control area, and trading posts.

=== Other Programs ===
The Cub Camp at Broad Creek focuses on younger youth. Programs include: aquanaut, archery, BB gun, a closing party with a songfest, gaga ball, geology, nature, an opening campfire, paddling, a pool luau, rowing, Scoutcraft, slingshots, a s’mores fire, a staff hunt, a life skills (STEAM) discovery program, swimming, team building, water games, and wildlife. Project Moving Onward & Outward Scouting Experience or M.O.O.S.E. is a hike or canoe trip to an outpost where participants spend the night after a campfire with singing, s’mores, a ceremony, and more. Adult training programs can include Basic Adult Leader Outdoor Orientation (BALOO), Cubmaster Leader Specifics, Religious Awards Awareness, Safe Swim Defense, Safety Afloat, This is Scouting, Youth Protection, and more.

=== Facilities ===
All three major camps have shower houses with individual hot water shower stalls, and flush toilets. Camps Saffran and Spencer have Olympic-size swimming pools. Each campsite includes a latrine with running water. Other facilities include an archery range, chapel, and Olympic-sized swimming pool in each. The Camp Saffran trading post offers branded apparel, camping supplies, candy, craft supplies, embroidered patches, Scouting literature, Scouting supplies, snacks, and sodas.

== Events ==
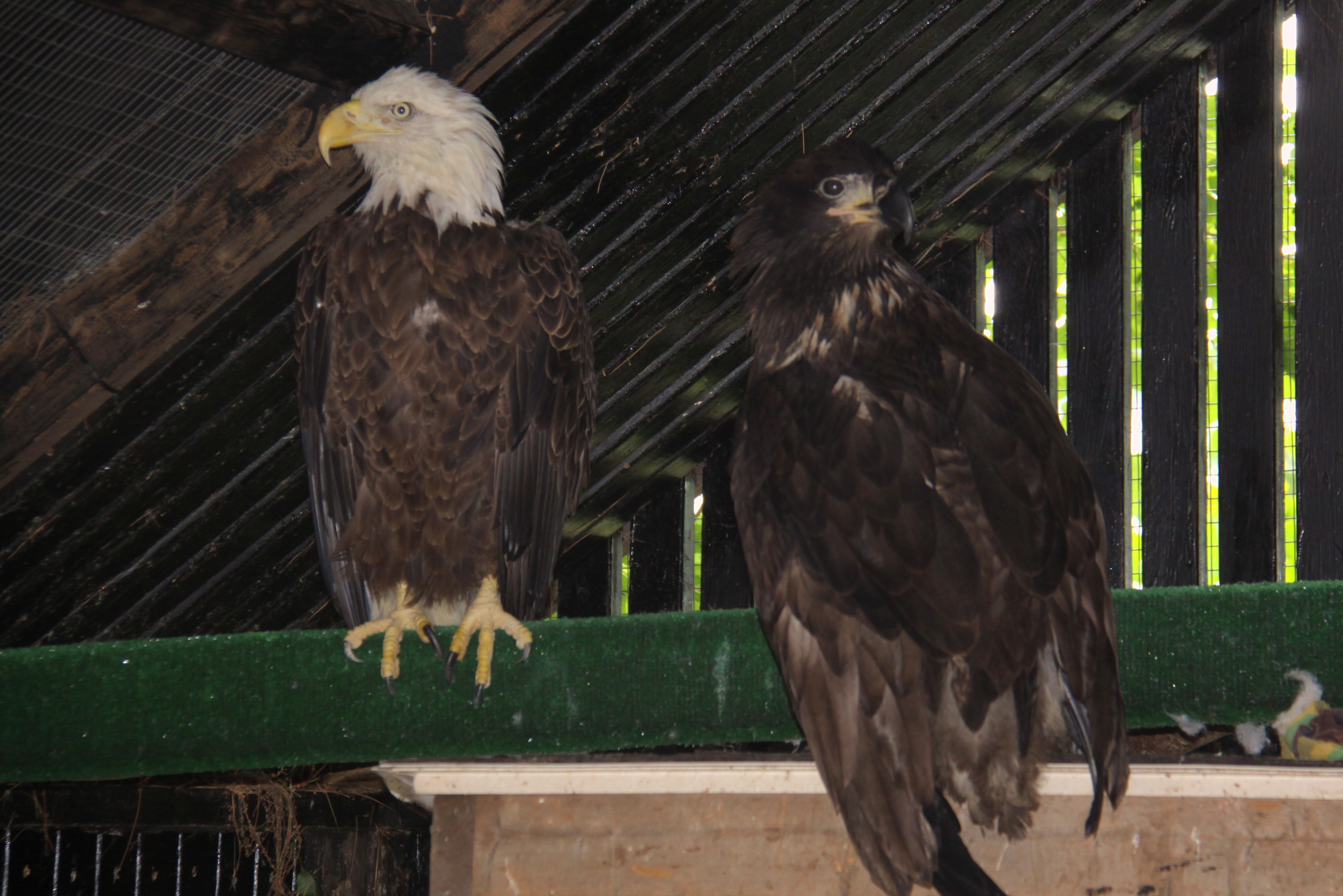
Harmony, the Broad Creek bald eagle

In addition to summer camps and weekend camping, the reservation hosts other Scouting events. Two of the many examples were the July 1986 Pennsylvania State University Science and Energy Specialty Camp. and the April, 2010 Harford County Astronomical Society Broad Creek Boy Scout Program.

The reservation has also hosted non-boy Scout groups including schools, governments, community, church groups and other non-profit organizations including Girl Scouts, Boys and Girls Clubs, the Cal Ripken Foundation, Quantico Orienteering Club events, Royal Rangers events, the NAACP youth program, search and rescue training groups including a K-9 facility in Camp Finney, and Maryland Department of Natural Resources and Harford County High School programs." In July 1997 the camp hosted the United States Army Research Laboratory Extended Use of Night Vision Goggles: An Evaluation of Comfort for Monocular and Biocular Configurations. The reservation routinely hosts Harford County Sheriff's Office training exercises. Camp Finney hosts the Harford County Sheriff's Office Rifle Range and K-9 training course facilities and, every four years since 2005, the Council's big annual orienteering day.

== See also ==
- Scouting in Delaware
- Scouting in Maryland
- Scouting in New Jersey
- Scouting in Pennsylvania
