= Girl Scout Council of the Nation's Capital =

- Owner: Girl Scouts of the USA
- Headquarters: Washington, DC
- Country: United States
- Membership: 90,000 (2009)
- Website www.gscnc.org

The Girl Scout Council of the Nation's Capital (GSCNC), more commonly Girl Scouts Nation's Capital, serves girls in Washington, D.C., and portions of Virginia, West Virginia and Maryland.

== History ==
The Girl Scout Council of the Nation's Capital as we know it today was formed in 1963 and encompassed five area councils that were in existence at that time, plus Calvert and Charles Counties in Maryland, and lone troops in Prince William, Loudoun, and Fauquier Counties in Virginia.

The merger that built GSCNC was very carefully crafted with full consideration given to all the councils and lone troops that were to merge. Prior to the merger, there was a year-long study made by a group composed of both GSUSA and the local councils. Under consideration was the real need of delivering the required services to girls so that all the girls could benefit from a strong and diverse program. The first meeting for the actual merger was on Friday, March 2, 1962. A committee of 15 was formed.

In 2004, the national organization began a series of mergers and realignment of the Girl Scout Councils throughout the nation. The purpose of this realignment is to create high-capacity councils, with volunteers, staff and financial resources to serve growing numbers of girls. By the end of 2009, this nationwide effort to combine councils reduced the number of Girl Scout Councils from 313 to 109. In 2006 the Penn Laurel Girl Scout Council in Frederick County, Maryland merged into GSCNC. In October 2009, Shawnee Council with 5,000 members and 491 troops in 14 counties, merged into GSCNC.

== Organization ==
States served by the Girl Scout Council of the Nation's Capital (light blue)
Map of Maryland with counties showing the different Girl Scout Councils

Map of West Virginia with counties showing the different Girl Scout Councils

Map of Virginia with counties showing the different Girl Scout Councils

GSCNC is headquartered in Washington, D.C., with satellite offices in Brandywine and Germantown, Maryland; Kingstown and South Riding, Virginia; and Martinsburg, West Virginia. GSCNC employs 115 full-time employees. The 2017 Operating Budget was $16M. As of the 2017 membership year, membership for the Council is over 87,000, including 60,000 girls and 27,000 adult volunteers.

== Programs and activities ==
In 2017, 188 girls, earned the Gold Award, the highest level of achievement for a Girl Scout. In 2010, Girl Scouts sold over 4.7 million boxes of Girl Scout Cookies.

Other programs include: Congressional Aide internships, Girl Scout Day at the National Air and Space Museum, DC Step Showcase, a Girl Scout performance of the Washington Ballet's Nutcracker, easy-to-do program kits for leaders, and programs in partnership with local museums and vendors. To encourage inclusion in all activities the “Including All Girls” patch program was launched and GSCNC served 522 girls with disabilities during camp programs.

GSCNC trained 1,907 volunteers through online and home study training courses in 2008. To attract graduating college seniors into volunteer roles with Girl Scouts, the Young Leader Program placed 118 college students as troop leaders at 54 sites in the District of Columbia and Prince George’s County.

SHARE, the council’s annual giving campaign raised $593,215 in 2008. In addition, over one million dollars was raised from foundations, corporations and government agencies. GSCNC provided $417,930 in financial aid to girls and adults to participate in GSCNC activities, start troops and fund camp fees.

== Camping ==
GSCNC owns and operates eight camps. In 2017, Girl Scouts introduced a new high ropes course at Camp White Rock, which includes tight ropes, cargo and raider bridge and a 300 ft zip line. During the summer months four camps are used as sleep-away camps.

Camps:

- Camp Aquasco is 172 acres (70 ha) in Aquasco, Maryland.
- Camp Brighton Woods is 60 acres (24 ha) near Ashton, Maryland.
- Camp Coles Trip is 225 acres (91 ha) near Stafford, Virginia.
- Camp Crowell is 60 acres (24 ha) near Oakton, Virginia.
- Camp May Flather is 45 acres (18 ha) located in the George Washington National Forest near Bridgewater, Virginia.
- Camp Potomac Woods is 101 acres (41 ha) located on the banks of the Potomac River near Leesburg, Virginia.
- Camp White Rock in Capon Bridge, West Virginia.
- Camp Winona is 176 acres (71 ha) located near Hughesville, Maryland.

== See also ==
- Scouting in Washington, D.C.
- National Capital Area Council
