= Scouting in Washington =

Scouting in Washington may refer to:

- Scouting in Washington (state)
- Scouting in Washington, D.C.
