= National Capital Area Council =

Local Scouting America council

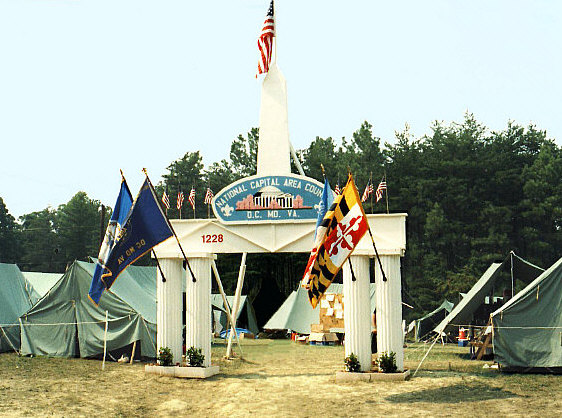
- Council gateway during the 1993 National Scout Jamboree at Fort Walker (formerly Fort A.P. Hill)
- Headquarters: Bethesda, Maryland
- Location: Washington metropolitan area; Washington, D.C.; Maryland; Virginia
- Country: United States
- Coordinates: 39°00′26″N 77°05′53″W
- Founded: 1911
- Membership: 35,523 (total youth served in 2025); 27,048 youth members (as of 2025-12-31); 13,654 adult volunteers (as of 2025-12-31)
- President: Louis Molinini
- Council Commissioner: Mark Longworth
- Scout Executive / CEO: Mario Pérez
- Affiliation: Scouting America
- Website ncacscouting.org

The Scouting America National Capital Area Council (NCAC) is a local council of Scouting America within the Northeast Region that serves the Washington metropolitan area, including Washington, D.C., portions of Maryland and Virginia. The council offers extensive training, and administrative support to units. Scouting America National Capital Area Council -- Number 082 -- is one of the largest of over 200 local councils chartered by Scouting America. Chartered in 1911, it is also one of the oldest. NCAC serves members from 18 districts -- a geographical area within a local council that organizes and supports local Scouting units -- spread across northern Virginia, Maryland, and the entirety of the District of Columbia. The Maryland counties NCAC serves include: Frederick, Montgomery, Prince George's, Calvert, Charles, St. Mary's; the Virginia counties include: Arlington, Fairfax, Prince William, Loudoun, Fauquier, Spotsylvania, Caroline, King George, Stafford, Culpeper, as well as the cities of Alexandria, Falls Church, Fairfax, Manassas, Manassas Park and Fredericksburg. NCAC has 2 youth to 1 adult volunteer ratio, which is among the highest of all the councils. The youth retention rate is currently 68.5%.

== History ==
William D. Boyce incorporated the Boy Scouts of America -- now known as Scouting America -- at 11:03 am on February 8, 1910, in the Washington, D.C., on the advice of railroad executive and later first national president of the organization Colin H. Livingstone, with assistance from lawyers at the firm Ralston, Siddons and Richardson. A year later the Scouting America National Capital Area Council was formed. The oldest unit in the council is Troop 52, chartered to All Saints Episcopal Church in Chevy Chase and was founded in 1913. When the Metropolitan Police Department of the District of Columbia decided that the security of suffrage marchers in 1916 was not their problem, the youth of Troop 52 took up that duty. Starting in 1996 the council annually sponsored the Commodore Henry I. Nygard Regatta along with the Friends of Sea Scouts of Maryland.

Many have served as council executive over the years. Linn Drake "headed the council through two world wars, [and] a depression." Clarence F. Urferr served as council executive from September 1, 1944, to March 1946, when he moved to Dallas to take over Region 3. Kenneth Spears served as council executive from March 1946 to 1951, when he was recalled by the US Air Force in the Korean War. Randolf Flythe left the council executive position to become the Northeast regional director. Ron Carroll served as council executive from 1990 to 2005. The most famous member of the council advisory board was Vince Lombardi.

In 2023, the NCAC appointed Mario Pérez as its Scout Executive/CEO. Pérez had previously served four years as the council's Deputy Scout Executive/Chief Operating Officer, and earlier was the Scout Executive/CEO of the Scouting America Yucca Council, which serves youth across West Texas and Southern New Mexico. Over a career spanning more than two decades, Pérez has held leadership roles in four Scouting America councils, contributing to program development and implementation for Scouts of all ranks.

The council's leadership had previously shifted in 2018, when Scout Executive Les Baron and Deputy Scout Executive Jeff Berger departed. The NCAC subsequently appointed Craig Poland -- formerly the Scout Executive of the Minsi Trails Council -- as its new Scout Executive, with Mario Pérez, then head of the Yucca Council, joining as his deputy. Following Poland's retirement in 2023, Pérez was selected to lead the council.

== Organization ==
The Scouting America National Capital Area Council is divided into four service areas, 18 districts, and one Learning for Life division.

Blue Service Area
- Four Mile Run District – serving Arlington County and the City of Alexandria, Virginia
- Prince George’s District – serving Prince George’s County, Maryland
- Washington, D.C. District – serving Washington D.C.
- Western Shore District – serving Calvert, Charles, and St. Mary’s Counties, Maryland

Green Service Area

- Accotink Bay District – serving the Fairfax County portion of Alexandria and the communities of Annandale, Fort Hunt, Hybla Valley, Kingstown, Lorton, Newington, and Springfield
- Burke Lake District – serving Burke, Fairfax Station, Kings Park, Newington Forest, Wakefield, and West Springfield
- Cub Run District – serving Centreville, Chantilly, Fair Lakes, Floris, Greenbriar, McNair, and Sully
- Difficult Run District – serving Dranesville, Great Falls, Herndon, Oakton, Reston, and the City of Fairfax.
- Wolf Trap District – Serving Bailey’s Crossroads, Idylwood, McLean, Seven Corners, Vienna, Wolf Trap, and the City of Falls Church.

Red Service Area

- Aquia District – serving Stafford County, Virginia and Quantico Marine Corps Base
- Mattaponi District – serving Caroline, King George, and Spotsylvania Counties and the City of Fredericksburg, Virginia
- Piedmont District – serving Culpeper and Fauquier Counties, Virginia
- Prince William District – serving Prince William County and the Cities of Manassas & Manassas Park, Virginia

Yellow Service Area

- Frederick District – Serving Frederick County, Maryland
- Loudoun District – Serving Loudoun County, Virginia
- Districts Serving Montgomery County, Maryland:
  - Potomac District
  - Seneca District
  - White Oak District

== Goshen Scout Reservation ==
Goshen Scout Reservation
- Owner: National Capital Area Council
- Location: 340 Millard Burke Memorial Highway (VA Route 601); Goshen, Virginia 22439
- Coordinates: 37.967°N 79.4695°W
- Camp size: 4,000-acre (16 km^{2})
- Founded: 1967
- Website www.gotogoshen.org

Three Scouting America resident summer camps, two Cub Scout resident camps, and one high adventure resident camp occupy the land purchased in 1960 by the National Capital Area Council that borders the Goshen and Little North Mountain Wildlife Management Area and Little Calfpasture River outside of Goshen, Virginia, for $300,000 that is now Goshen Scout Reservation, often called just Goshen. Each camp program includes camping, swimming, merit badge counseling, shooting sports, boating, all-terrain vehicle riding, ecology education and Scoutcraft activities.

The camps are all built around the 425 acres (1,720,000 m^{2}) Lake Merriweather, that was created by damming the Little Calfpasture River in 1966, before it joins with the Calfpasture to become the Maury, with a structure 38 feet (12 m) high and 1,300 feet (400 m) long. Lake Merriweather was named for Marjorie Merriweather Post, an ardent supporter of Scouting in the Washington, D.C., area. U.S. Steel public relations executive William G. Whyte helped acquire the tract of more than 4,000 acres (16 km^{2}) that is now the land of the Goshen Scout Reservation.

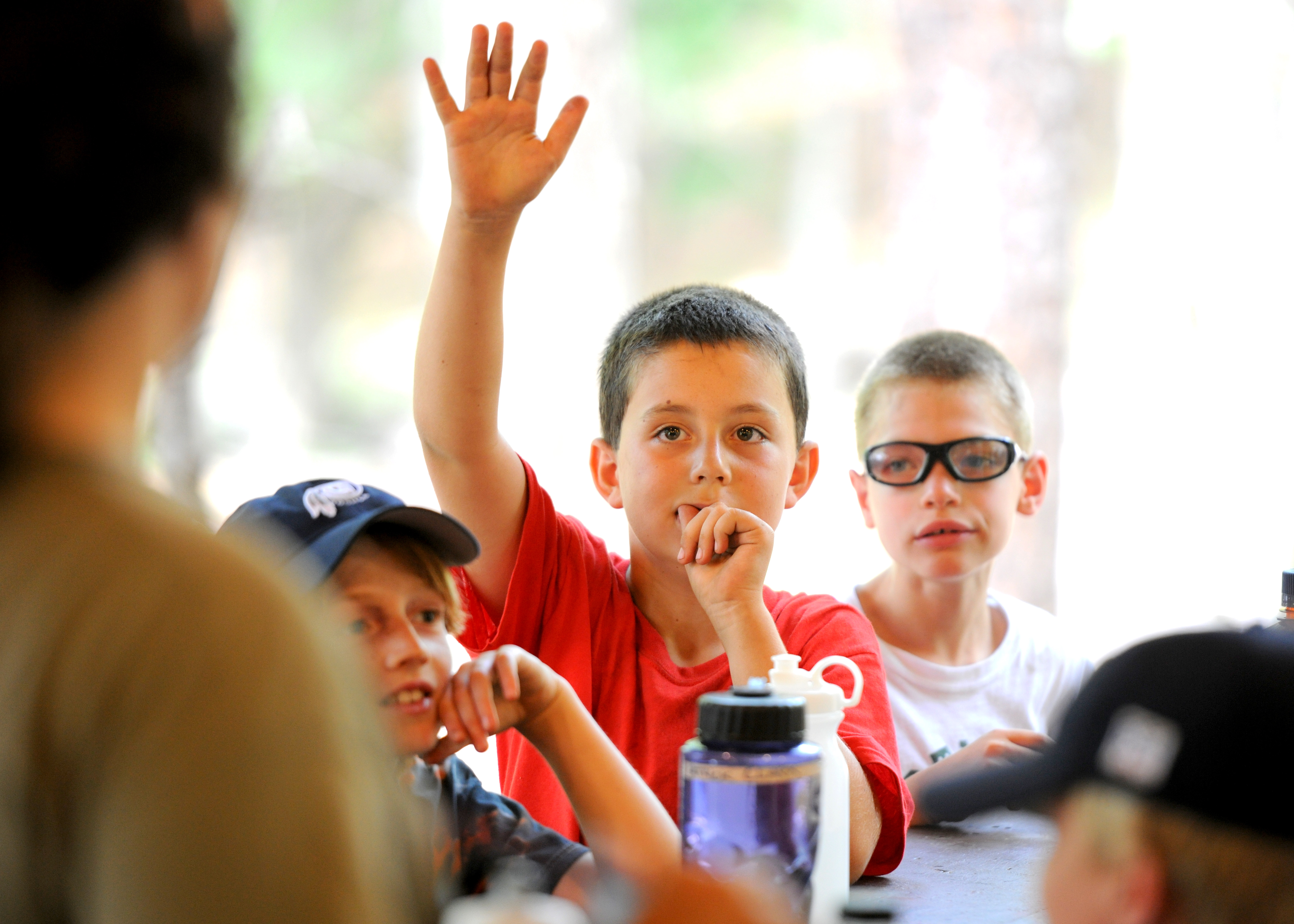
Scout asking a question at a Goshen Scout camp

The Goshen reservation is the sum of seven separate camps circling Lake Merriweather. Camp Baird focuses on high adventure experiences. Camp Bowman, Marriott and Olmsted all focus on Scouts BSA. Camp PMI and Ross focus on Webelos. Bowman provides meals where each unit's patrols all prepare their own meal at their own campsites, some other camps use dining halls. Camp Marriott offers campers a choice; they can either participate in the same patrol cooking method, or “heater stack”, a slightly different dining experience where troops eat pre-prepared food in their site; there is no dining hall at Marriott. Camp Post focuses on administrative functions and facilities used by all campers like the COPE climbing tower and ropes course.

During the first season of the drama 24 the fictional character Kim Bauer wears a Goshen Boy Scout Reservation shirt.

In commemoration of Goshen Scout Reservation's 50th anniversary, the National Capital Area Council hosted a camporee for all council Scouts and alumni on Memorial Day weekend 2017. Nearly 1,700 participants and 300 staff (youth and adults) enjoyed boating and sailing, shooting sports, geocaching, climbing, and outdoor skill challenges.

== Camp William B. Snyder ==
Camp William B. Snyder
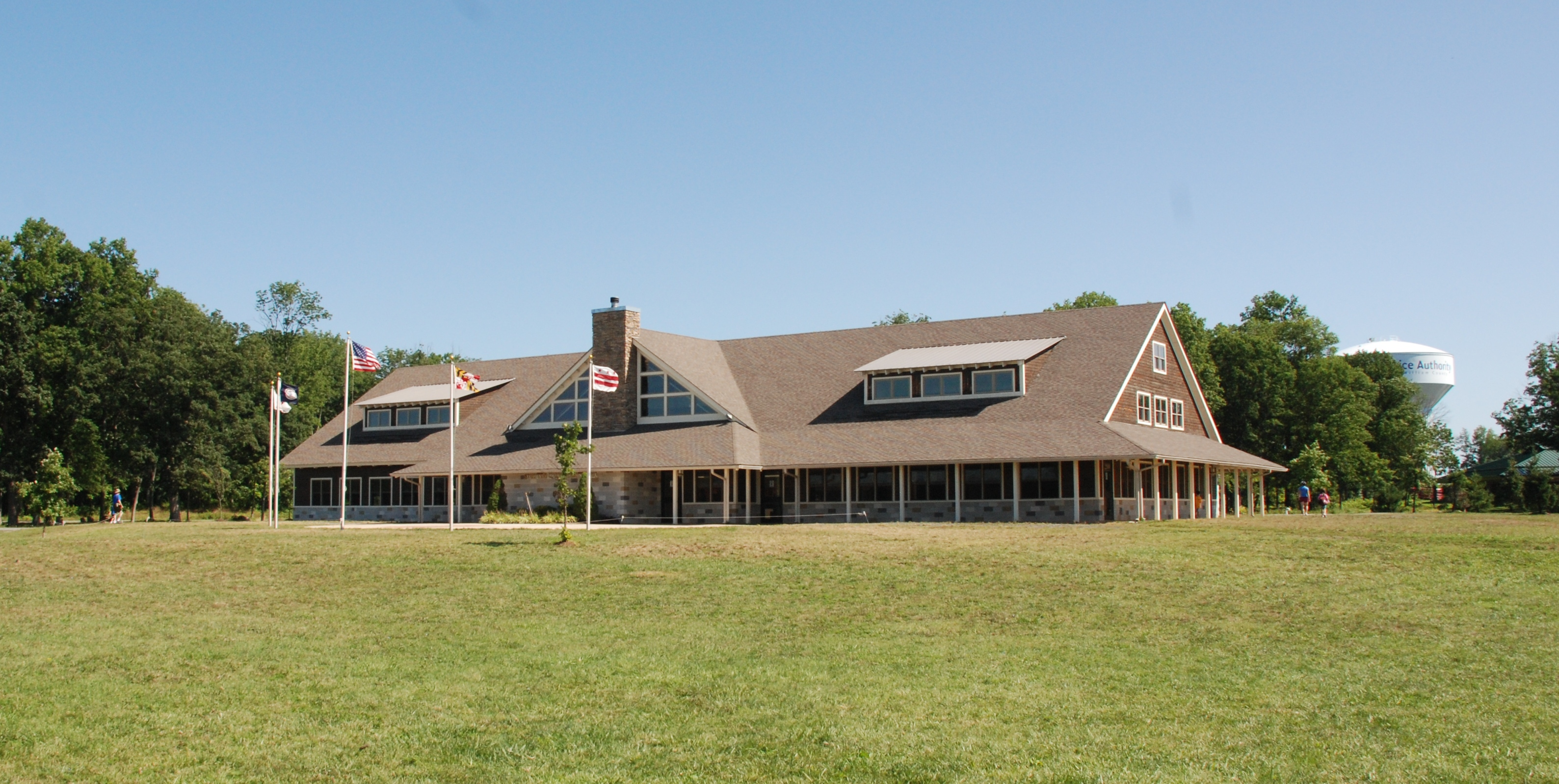
- Marriott Dining Hall at Camp William B. Snyder

- Location: 6100 Antioch Road; Haymarket, VA, 20169
- Coordinates: 38.8100879°N 77.6904586°W
- Camp size: 405 acres (1.64 km^{2})
- Founded: May 6, 2006
- Website ncacbsa.org/outdoors/camp-william-b-snyder

Camp William B. Snyder or just Camp Snyder is an 405-acre (1.64 km^{2}) Cub Scout Camp in Prince William, Virginia, owned by the National Capital Area Council of the Boy Scouts of America. It is one of the largest Cub Scout Camps in the United States, with a dining hall that can accommodate 600 dinners at one time. The dining hall displays a picture of the building's namesake, Eagle Scout and former Marriott International executive Stephen Marriott, during his time as a Scout. Chairman of program development Raymond Johns said that the camp will serve about 1,000 Cub Scouts a week. Program areas include an archaeological site, archery, air rifle range, boating, campfire, ecology education, fishing, gaga pit, handicrafts, sailing ship, swimming pool, and western style fort. Both bald eagles and red-tailed hawks can be seen at the camp.

In 1994 The Walt Disney Company bought extensive amounts of land in Haymarket, Virginia, for a proposed Disney's America theme park. Local resistance to the resort led to its end as a viable idea. William B. Snyder, a local business man convinced Disney to sell the property to him. Snyder, in turn, sold off most of the land to developers, except for the 405 acres (1.64 km^{2}) donated to the National Capital Area Council. Brian Luss served as the initial camp director.

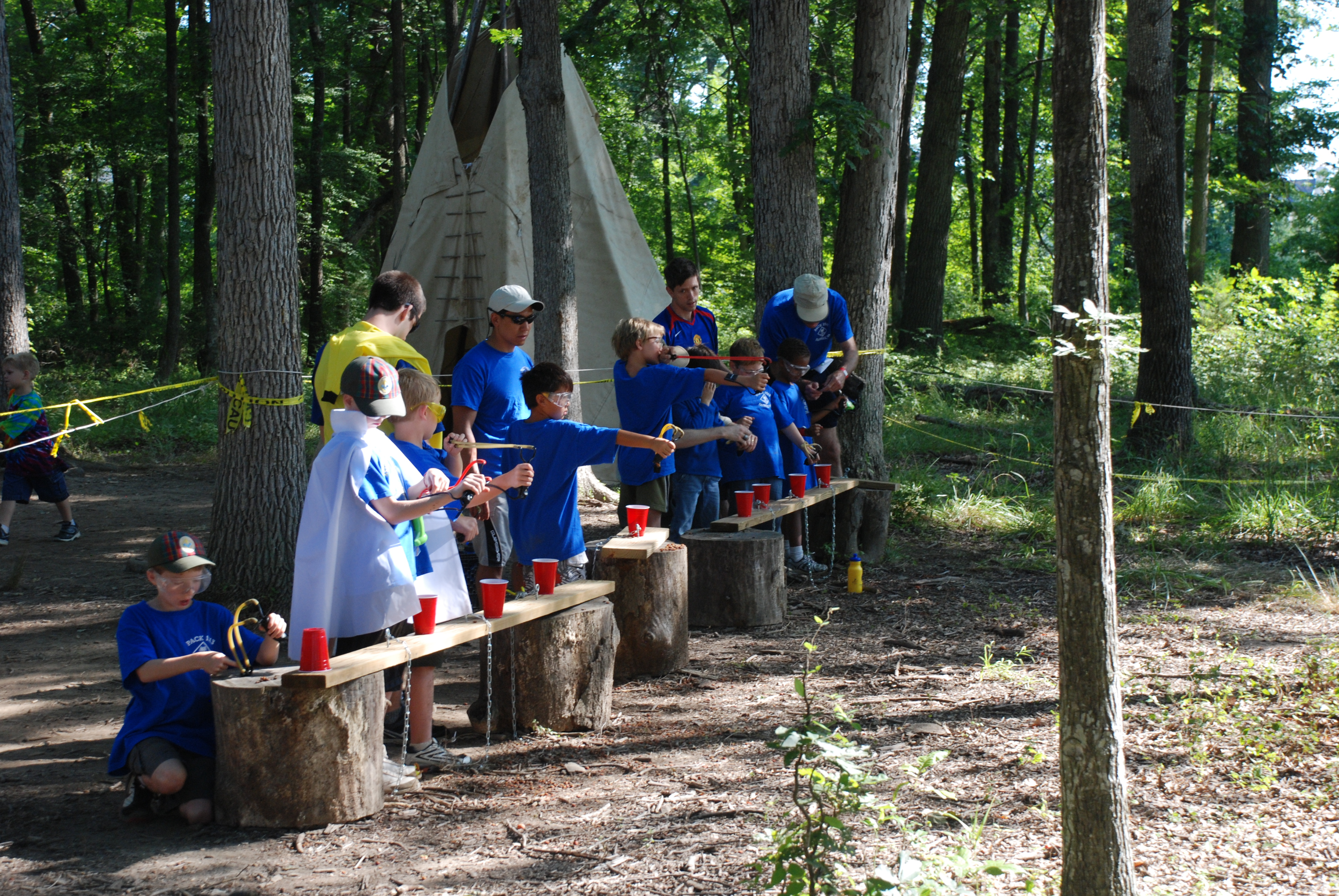
Slingshot firing at Camp William B. Snyder

In addition to summer camps, the camp has also hosted diverse Scouting events. During the summer of 2006 the camp hosted more than 1,000 youth participants at the greater DC area Cub Scout Jamboree in association with the Entomological Foundation. On May 3, 2008, the camp hosted more than 4,000 at the council-wide spring camporee, which included a visit from McGruff the Crime Dog. On May 28–29, 2016 the camp hosted the joint Jewish and Islamic Committee on Scouting Annual Camporee. On October 29, 2016, the camp hosted simulations of both an airplane and a school bus crash where volunteer victims acted out fictional injuries for Scouts to practice emergency aid skills. More than 1,000 Scouts and leaders from the Bull Run, Occoquan, Patriot and Sully Districts participated along with representatives from the Amangamek Wipit Lodge, American Red Cross, Asymmetric Warfare Group, Aviation Institute of Maintenance, Cookies and Cream, Fairfax County Sheriff's Office, George Mason Reserve Officers' Training Corps Cadets, Halloween Spirit Store, Lowe's, Outback Steakhouse, Prince William County Department of Fire and Rescue, Prince William County Police Department, Shawn Landry & Quality Business Engineering, and the Virginia Airborne Search and Rescue Squad.

The camp has hosted events not connected to Scouting as diverse as USA Cycling Sportif Cross Cup Series, Sound United Drumline rehearsal, and the Northern Virginia Mormon Prom. For several years the Alexandria-Fairfax Alumni Chapter of the Kappa Alpha Psi fraternity run Kamp Kappa at Camp Snyder. Kamp Kappa campers are young men between the ages of 10–16 years physical challenges to encourage creative thinking, team building, self-respect, and respect for others. Group discussions and lectures cover health and drug awareness, cultural diversity, personal hygiene, and etiquette. Kamp Kappa also makes use of all the camp outdoor oriented facilities like canoeing, hiking, and swimming. Every September from 2005 to 2008 the Goose Creek district held a model rocket launching event at the camp. The camp was one of many official National Get Outdoors sites on the first annual National Get Outdoors Day on June 14, 2008. On June 4, 2010, at the camp the Forest Service and Prince William County Public Schools partnered to hold a conservation education program for 500 students that culminated in youth participants earning the Junior Forest Ranger distinction. On May 11, 2012, at the camp the Prince William Area Agency on Aging hosted a picnic with over 400 participants. May 13–14, 2014 the camp hosted the inaugural National Capital Area Council Sporting Clays Tournament, which returned in 2015, then in 2016 was renamed the Sporting Clays Classic. On September 19, 2015, the camp hosted the Outdoor Channel production crew of the show NRA All Access who worked with dozens of local Scouts demonstrating several different types of shooting for a season five episode of the show. On March 26, 2016, the camp hosted an Easter egg hunt for 0-10-year-old children with a costumed Easter Bunny. On May 18, 2017, the camp hosted the Older American Picnic sponsored by Prince William Area Agency on Aging. This event included dancing, games, nature trails, motorcycle rides, fitness walk and entertainment by Norman Voss.

== Camp Howard M. Wall ==
Camp Howard M. Wall
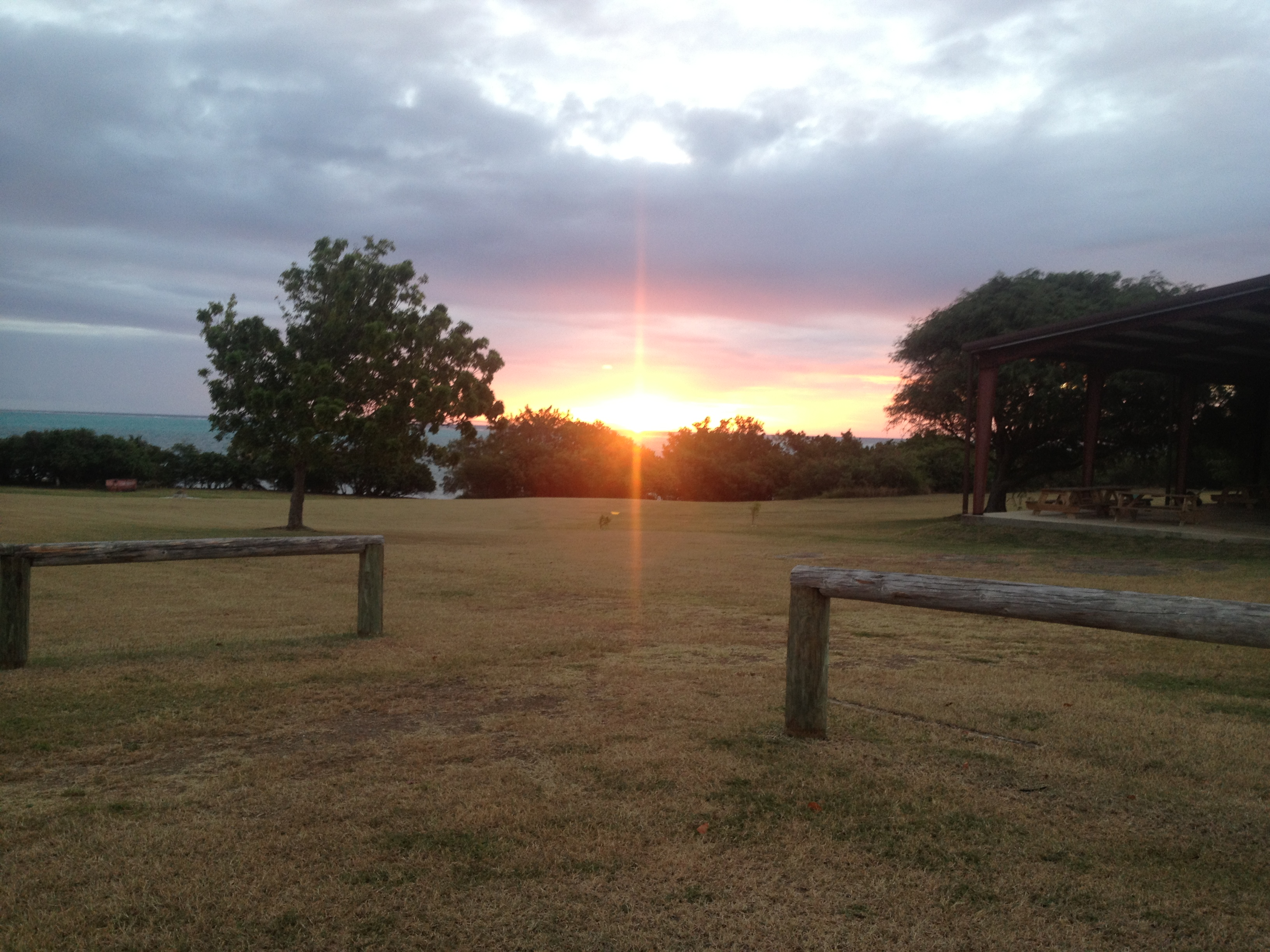

- Location: Boy Scout Camp, Christiansted; Saint Croix, 00820 USVI
- Coordinates: 17.7167907°N 64.6669458°W
- Camp size: 19-acre (0.077 km^{2})
- Website www.ncacbsa.org

Named for Howard M. Wall, who added the estates Fareham, Petronella, and Longford to the Castle Nugent Farms cattle ranch in 1951, the Camp Howard M. Wall at Milord Point Beach on Route 62 at Great Pond Bay, in Estate Fareham, USVI is on the southeast end of Saint Croix. The camp is "located at the west side of Great Pond Bay." The camp offers bunkhouses intended to accommodate eight people per room, a shower house with gender segregated facilities, and a dining hall. Other facilities include a climbing tower, ropes course, central pavilion, and rifle range. Programs include fishing, games, guided kayak tour in Salt River Bay, hiking to the tidal pools, Jeep tour of St. Croix, Jeep tour of the rainforest, kayaking, shooting, snorkeling, snorkeling at Buck Island Reef National Monument, sports, swimming, and visiting historic Christiansted.

The camp has also hosted events not connected to Scouting. Since 2016 Catch The Vision International has sponsored an annual mission trip where participants stay at the camp. On June 21, 2012, at the camp the Virgin Islands National Guard hosted Shadow Warriors Fun Day, which included meeting Kofi Kingston. On June 25–30, 2012 at the camp the US Virgin Islands National Guard Youth Program held the St. Croix Youth Leadership Camp which included activities focused on agriculture, culture, marine science, masquerading, resilience, self-awareness, storytelling, survival, swimming, team building, and the environment.

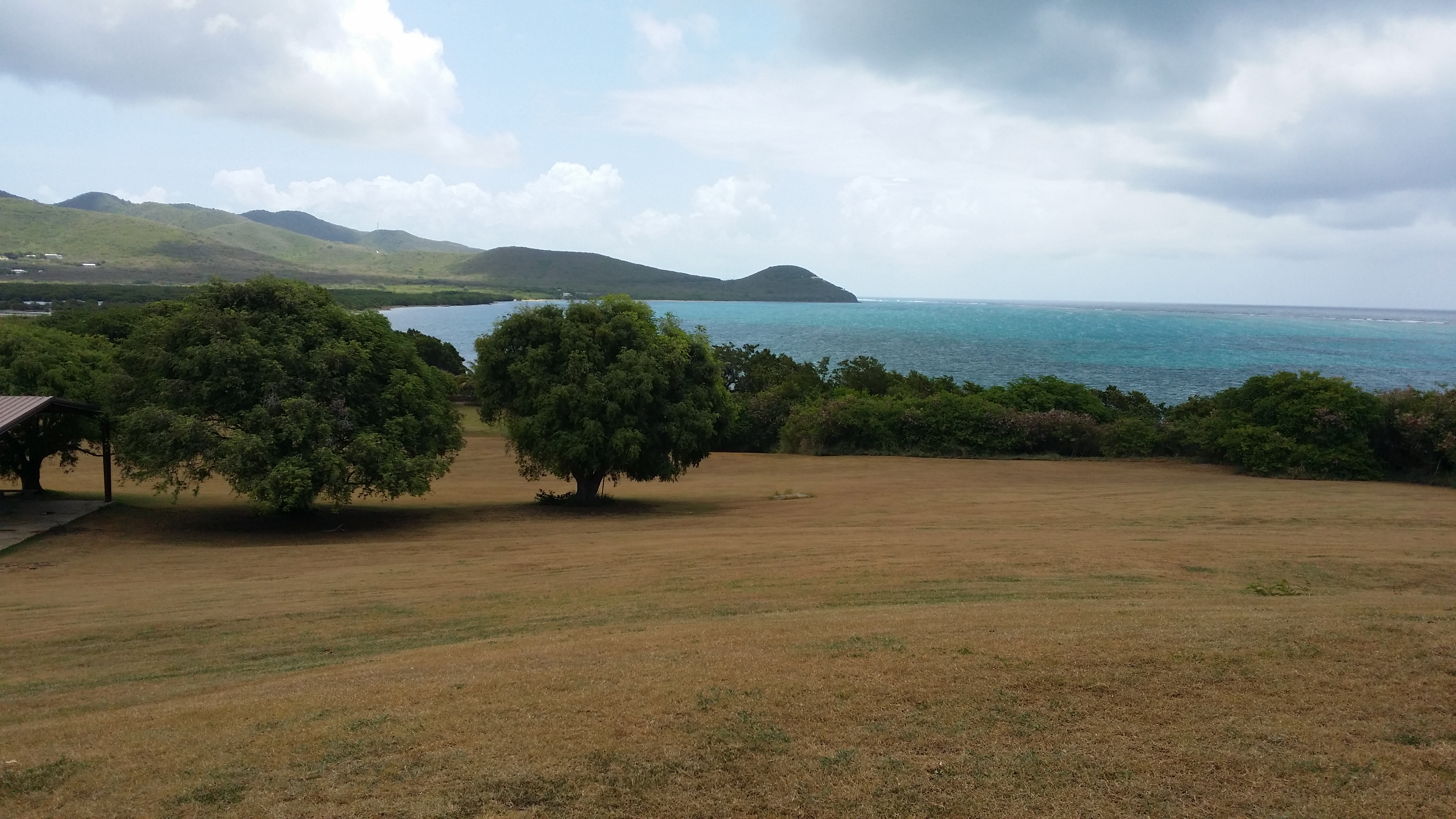
View of camp facing Great Pond Bay

== Camp Roosevelt ==
Camp Roosevelt
- Location: Chesapeake Beach, Maryland
- Coordinates: 38.638052°N 76.528076°W
- Founded: 1914
- Defunct: 1967

Camp Roosevelt existed 9 miles (14 km) south of Chesapeake Beach, Maryland, from 1914 to 1967. When the camp was a shared summer camp of both Washington and Baltimore councils in 1914 the camp was called Camp Archibald Butt. "Camp Roosevelt was the first permanent Boy Scout camp in the country." The Calvert County visitors guide refers to the camp as, "Maryland's first permanent Boy Scout camp." Camp Roosevelt employed many counselors over the years of the camp's life including Richard A. Adams who would serve in the Royal Air Force then the United States Army Air Forces, and later found Adams Company Realty in Wheaton. The camp is the location of the founding of the Clan of the Mystic Oak in 1921, an honor society with goals to "further Scouting, advance the interests of Camp Roosevelt, and to promote fellowship among its members."

Camp sites were called ranches. Each site was named for places related to Theodore Roosevelt like Big Horn, Buckskin, Chimney Butte, Elk Horn, Powder River, and San Juan. "There were several buildings on the property, notably a large mess hall, an infirmary and several Adirondack cabins."

From July 24 to August 6, 1922, the camp ran a program specifically for Scouts active with the Catholic Churches of Washington organized by Boy Scout Bureau Washington District Council National Council of Catholic Men chairman Dr. TJ Murphy. Trinity Episcopal Church rector, reverend J. C. M. Shrewsbury, took Troop 102 of Upper Marlboro to the camp for two weeks on Jul 25, 1927.

On September 24, 1952, during the meeting that dissolved the Clan of the Mystic Oak that organization purchased a memorial in the name of the organization to Dr. Walter H. Merrill, who had served as a doctor at Camp Roosevelt. Ralph Lauren's first time golfing came at the camp when he was age 14 in 1953. 70 flu cases in 1957 caused the camp to close early on July 11. The camp was sold in the late 1970s. Today the property is "now a residential area."

In the early part of the 20th century, the council owned Camp Woodrow Wilson, centered where Colesville Road passes over the Northwest Branch of the Anacostia River.

== Order of the Arrow ==
Amangamek-Wipit Lodge #470
- Totem: Arrow & Washington Monument superimposed on a shark tooth
- Founded: 1952
- Lodge Chief: Sophie S
- Lodge Vice Chief of Operations: Ben M
- Lodge Vice Chief for Administration and Communication: Vacant
- Lodge Vice Chief for Membership and Finance: Caitlin A
- Advisers: Kurt Brandenburg & Kelley Wratkowski
- Website wipit470.org

In 1915, at Treasure Island Scout Reservation on the Delaware River E. Urner Goodman and Carroll A. Edson started an honor society, Wimachtendienk ("Brotherhood" in the Lenape language), to recognize Scouts who best implemented the Scout Oath and Scout Law as examples to follow. This organization is today known as the Order of the Arrow.

Six years later and 200 miles (320 km) away at Camp Roosevelt a group that called itself the Clan of the Mystic Oak formed in 1921, with the nearly identical goals of "further Scouting, advance the interests of Camp Roosevelt, and to promote fellowship among its members." While the Clan of the Mystic Oak was specific to Camp Roosevelt in Chesapeake Beach, Maryland, the Order of the Arrow spread across the country as it formed new lodges. Lodges are the smallest standard unit of the order and each is chartered to a local Scout council. The National Capital Area Council chartered what is now called the Amangamek-Wipit lodge on March 12, 1952. At the time of the first banquet on December 29, 1952, Amangamek-Wipit had 89 members. That growth was enough to convince the Clan of the Mystic Oak members to dissolve the clan and join the order (Note: members would say "join the brotherhood") at a meeting on September 24, 1952.

When chartered in 1952 the Amangamek-Wipit lodge had no name. With Scouts at Camp Roosevelt finding numerous shark teeth along the Chesapeake since 1914 the lodge decided to incorporate that history into their totem by placing the Washington Monument on an arrow on a shark's tooth at a meeting in June 1953. Following the advice of a Smithsonian Institution language expert that there was no word for shark, and Amanquemack translated to large fish, the lodge adopted the name Amanquemack at that same meeting. In 1952 the members voted to change the lodge name to Amangamek-Wipit after learning that Amangamek was the correct word for large fish and Wipit was the correct word for tooth.

As a charter member of Area 3c the lodge participated in the 1953 Area 3-C Pow Wow at Camp Darden. The lodge participated in the 1954 area 3c Pow Wow at Camp Rock Enon. The lodge participated in the 1955 area 3c Pow Wow at Camp Shawondasee. The lodge hosted the 1956 area 3c Pow Wow at Camp Roosevelt. The lodge participated in the 1957 area 3c Pow Wow at Camp Powhatan. The lodge participated in the 1958 area 3c Pow Wow at Camp Shenandoah. The lodge participated in the 1959 area 3c Pow Wow at Camp Shawondasee. The lodge participated in the 1960 area 3c Pow Wow at Camp Monocan. The lodge participated in the 1961 area 3c Pow Wow at the Pipsico Scout Reservation. The lodge participated in the 1962 area 3c Pow Wow at Camp Rock Enon. The lodge participated in the 1963 area 3c Pow Wow at Camp Powhatan. The lodge participated in the 1964 area 3c Pow Wow at Camp Monocan. The lodge hosted the 1965 area 3c Pow Wow at Camp Wilson. The lodge participated in the 1966 area 3c Training Conference at the Pipsico Scout Reservation. The lodge participated in the 1967 area 3c Pow Wow at Camp Shenandoah. The lodge participated in the 1968 area 3c Pow Wow at Camp Powhatan. The lodge participated in the 1969 area 3c Pow Wow at the Virginia State Fairgrounds in Richmond. The lodge participated in the 1970 area 3c Pow Wow at the Siouan Scout Reservation. The lodge participated in the 1971 area 3c Pow Wow at the Pipsico Scout Reservation. The lodge participated in the 1973 section Southeast 1 Pow Wow at Camp Rock Enon. The lodge participated in the 1973 National Order of the Arrow Conference at the University of California-Santa Barbara. The lodge participated in the 1974 section Southeast 1 Conclave at the Siouan Scout Reservation.

== Stores ==

The council currently maintains three official stores within the Washington metropolitan area that sell official merchandise like uniform items, pinewood derby supplies, merit badge pamphlets, patches and camping equipment; as well as branded materials like office supplies, home decor, and gift items. The first store, the National Capital Scout Shop, is located at 9190 Rockville Pike, Bethesda, Maryland, at the council headquarters. The second store, the Northern Virginia Scout Shop, is located at 5232 Port Royal Rd, Springfield, Virginia. The third store, NCAC Trading Post at Camp Snyder, is located at 6100 Antioch Rd, Haymarket, Virginia, within Camp Snyder. The council plans to open another store in the U.S. Virgin Islands.

== See also ==
- Girl Scout Council of the Nation's Capital
- Scouting in Virginia
- Scouting in Washington, D.C.
- Scouting in Maryland
- Scouting in the United States Virgin Islands
