= Baltimore County Council =

Baltimore County Council could be:

- Baltimore Area Council of the Boy Scouts of America
- Baltimore County Council, part of the Baltimore County, Maryland government
