= Washington County Council =

Washington County Council may be:

- Washington County Council (Maryland) (#221)
- Washington County Council (New York) (#388)
- Washington County Council (Ohio) (#464)
- Washington County Council (Tennessee) (#559)
- Washington County Council (Pennsylvania) (#720)
