= Wilmington Council =

Wilmington Council may be:

- District Council of Wilmington
- Wilmington Council (Delaware)
- Wilmington Council (North Carolina)
