= Del-Mar-Va Council =

Boy Scouts of America council serving the Delmarva Peninsula

Del-Mar-Va Council (#081)
- Owner: Scouting America
- Headquarters: Dover, Delaware
- Country: United States
- Website www.delmarvacouncil.org

The Del-Mar-Va Council serves members of Scouting America in the Delmarva Peninsula.

== Organization ==
Del-Mar-Va Council is divided into four districts:

- Blue Hen District
- Chesapeake District
- Coastal District
- Blue Crab District

== Henson Scout Reservation ==
Henson Scout Reservation
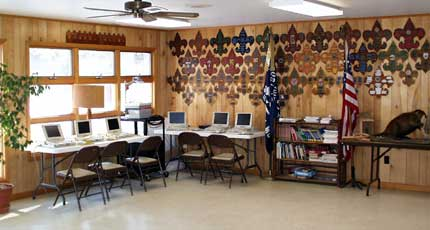
- Administration building lounge in 2003

- Location within Maryland Location within the United States
- Coordinates: 38.55796°N 75.73684°W
- Founded: 1965

Henson Scout Reservation, also known as Camp Nanticoke, is an 1,800-acre (7.3 km^{2}) Scout camp located on the Delmarva Peninsula near Galestown, Maryland. One of three Scout camps on the peninsula, it serves thousands of Scouts throughout the summer months, and is open year-round for special Scout programs and for rental by outside groups. Scouts BSA and Cub Scout summer programs are run separately.

=== History ===
Named for the aviator and philanthropist from Salisbury, Maryland Richard A. Henson, Henson Scout Reservation has been in operation by the Del-Mar-Va Council since the summer of 1965. The camp was originally known as Camp Nanticoke, which is now the name of the primary camping area. (The original plan was to develop two camps on a single reservation — Camp Nanticoke and Camp Choptank — but that never materialized.) Today, the entire reservation is still known by many as simply "Camp Nanticoke."

The camp's largely undeveloped 1,889 acres (7.64 km^{2}) are widely recognized as an environmental gem, with habitat for countless birds, mammals and fish, including the bald eagle. The entire camp was protected in a conservation easement in partnership with The Nature Conservancy.

=== Scouts BSA programs ===
Henson Scout Reservation offers a wide range of traditional Scouts BSA summer camp programs, including swimming, nature/ecology, handicrafts, Scoutcraft (camping and outdoors skills), archery, rifle and shotgun shooting and fishing. Its first-year camper program, known as Brownsea, is extremely popular. Located on the Marshyhope Creek, a tributary of the Nanticoke River, the camp has a thriving waterfront program, offering canoeing, rowing, sailing and motorboating. It also has a fitness program, including physical fitness, biking and golf merit badges.

For older Scouts, the camp offers a high adventure trekking program, involving a week-long canoe/bicycling trek around the Nanticoke River watershed. Its Eagle Base program is designed to give older Scouts the opportunity to earn specialized merit badges required for the Eagle rank.

=== Cub Scouting programs ===
While traditionally Cub Scouts have participated in day camps, Henson Scout Reservation offers an overnight/resident camp, designed to introduce Cub Scouts to the basics of camping in a supportive, structured environment. It offers 3-day, 2-night sessions for both Cub Scouts and Webelos and weeklong sessions just for Webelos. Each year's programs are thematic. The summer 2008 theme was Wild West.

The 2007 theme was "Exploring the New World," marking the 400th anniversary of Capt. John Smith's exploration of the Chesapeake Bay.

== Rodney Scout Reservation ==
Rodney Scout Reservation

- Location within Maryland Location within the United States
- Location: North East, Maryland
- Coordinates: 39°31′43″N 75°57′26″W
- Founded: 1923
- Website https://www.delmarvacouncil.org/

Rodney Scout Reservation, operated by the Del-Mar-Va Council, Boy Scouts of America, is located on 900 acres (3.6 km^{2}) of rolling upland woodlands at the head of the Chesapeake Bay and boasts over a mile of prime bay frontage. It has been in continuous operation since 1923.

=== History ===
Rodney is located in Cecil County, Maryland, about 6 miles (9.7 km) Southeast of Interstate 95 or U.S. Route 40 off Maryland Route 272 near North East. The camp location provides easy access from Baltimore, Washington, Wilmington, and Philadelphia.

It is on the site of an old abandoned iron mining site formerly titled Whitaker Iron. In 1922, Senator T. Coleman du Pont and his wife donated the land to the Wilmington Council, as the Del-Mar-Va Council was then known. The couple gave much funding for the fledgling Scout camp that has multiple facilities, campgrounds for roughly two dozen troops and many merit badges. Such activities include traditional Scouting programs as well as robotics, shooting sports, sailboating and power boating, rock climbing, cycling, and geocaching.

=== Summer Camp ===
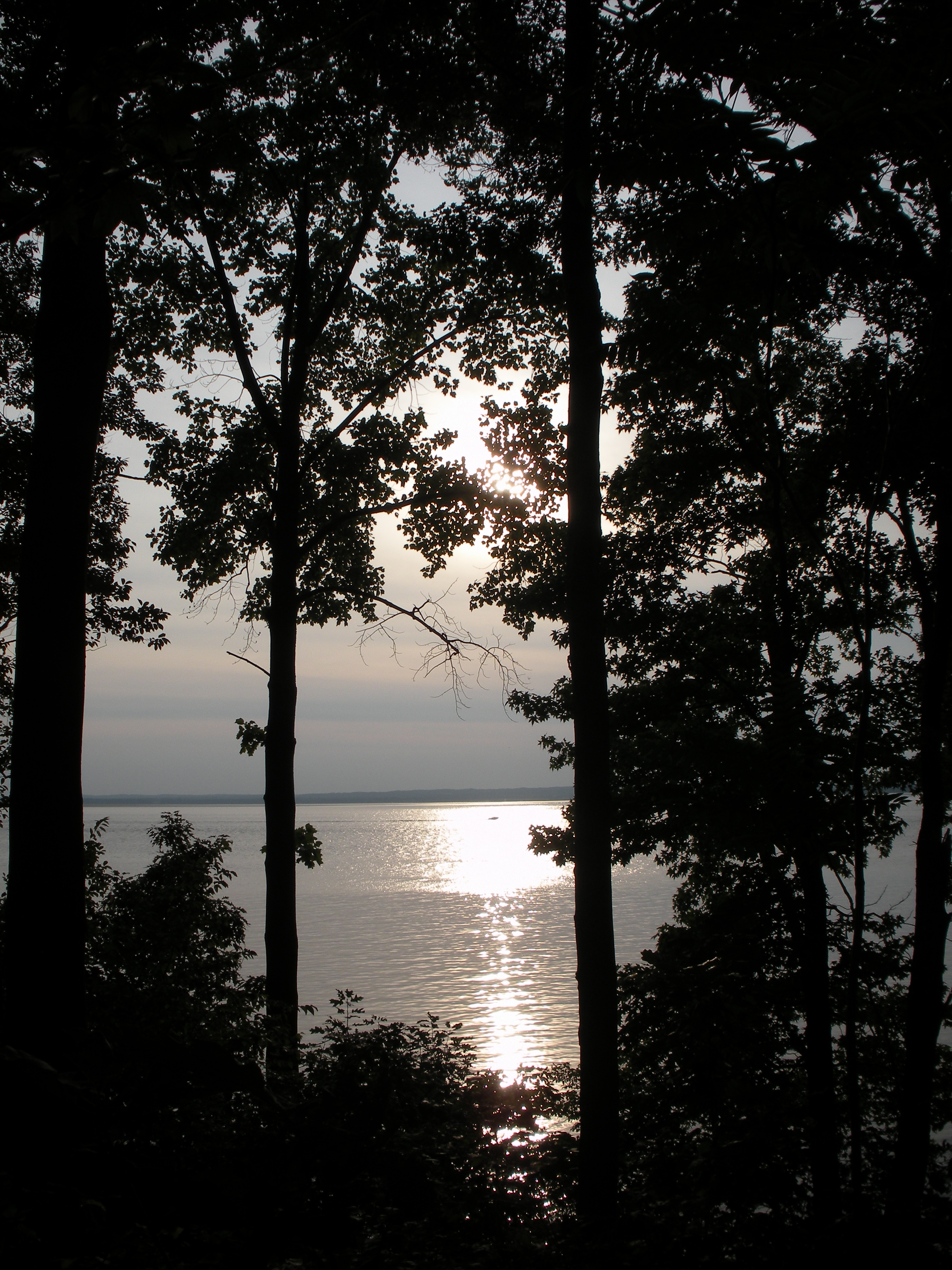
The Chesapeake Bay as seen from Rodney Scout Reservation

For seven to eight weeks during the summer, Rodney is open for long-term summer camping, staffed by paid employees of Del-Mar-Va Council. Merit badges and other programs are offered in the areas of:

- Aquatics: pool, sailing base, and boatyard.
- Brownsea: 1st year camper program located behind the main trading post.
- Climbing: located across the path from Brown Lodge.
- Bull mountain Studios (Handicraft): connected to the main trading post
- Health and Fitness: located behind the Health Lodge. (Formerly behind Samson trading post)
- NEST (Nature, Ecology, Science, and Technology): located at the Nature Lodge down the road from the parade field.
- Scoutcraft: located next to the Camp Director's house.
- Range and Target Activity (archery, shotgun, and rifle): grouped together between the trading post and Scoutcraft.

=== Winter camping ===
From September to May, Rodney is open for weekend camping, staffed by the volunteer Rodney Campmaster Crews. Some weekends offer programs put forth by districts in Del-Mar-Va Council. Most weekends include a program such as orienteering, cooking, rifle shooting, or many others put on by the campmaster crews.

== Akridge Scout Reservation ==
Akridge Scout Reservation
- Location within Delaware Location within the United States
- Location: Dover, Delaware
- Coordinates: 39°07′47″N 75°33′01″W
- Founded: 2011
- Website https://www.delmarvacouncil.org/

Akridge Scout Reservation, operated by the Del-Mar-Va Council, Boy Scouts of America, is located on 85 acres (0.3 km^{2}) of farmland in Dover, Delaware, and is the first Boy Scout camp in Delaware. Groundbreaking took place on September 17, 2011. The first event held there was a Council Jamboree on May 4–6, 2012.

== Order of the Arrow ==
=== Nentego Lodge 20 History ===
On July 29, 1925, an Order of the Arrow charter was granted to Unalachtico Lodge of the Del-Mar-Va Council. The Lodge drew its membership from Camp Rodney and was named after the Unalachtigo Lenape (or Delaware Indians) who had inhabited the area. The totem was the turkey. By the late 1930s, the lodge had become inactive and was disbanded.

Through the efforts of the Delmont Lodge #43 of the Valley Forge Council, Lodge #20 was reorganized on June 22, 1957. The new name chosen by the membership was Nentego, a derivation of the name of one of the major Delaware Tribes, which means, "People from across the water." Delmont Lodge inducted two youth from each district and the council professional staff to provide the initial core of Nentego Lodge. The Lodge totem is the Rockfish, which can be found in the Chesapeake Bay. The lodge colors are blue, for the water of the Chesapeake, and grey, for the Rockfish. The first lodge flap appeared in 1957, and its basic design remains in use today.

=== Section NE-4C History ===
Section NE-4C was established in June 1994, following a realignment of the councils and areas of the Northeast Region. The Section had been formerly known as NE-6 until the 1994 realignment, which resulted in the elimination of Area 6 and the transfer of NE-6 charter lodge Ahthuhquog #540 to Section NE-5. Section NE-4C is now one of the three Order of the Arrow Sections in Area 4 of the Northeast Region. Section NE-6 was formed on May 22, 1982 when its five charter lodges were transferred with their respective councils from SE-9 in the Southeast Region to the Northeast Region. A sixth lodge, Black Eagle, transferred from NE-3A to NE-6 in June 1982. Section NE-6 continued as a group of six lodges until a 1988 realignment of the Northeast Region. In November of that year, Susquehannock and Tuckahoe Lodges from NE-5B and Wunita Gokhos from NE-5A joined Section NE-6. Since the formation of NE-4C, three lodges have been transferred to other sections, Ahthuhquog, Black Eagle, and Wunita Gokhos.

== See also ==
- Scouting in Delaware
- Scouting in Maryland
- Scouting in Virginia
