= Scouting in Maryland =

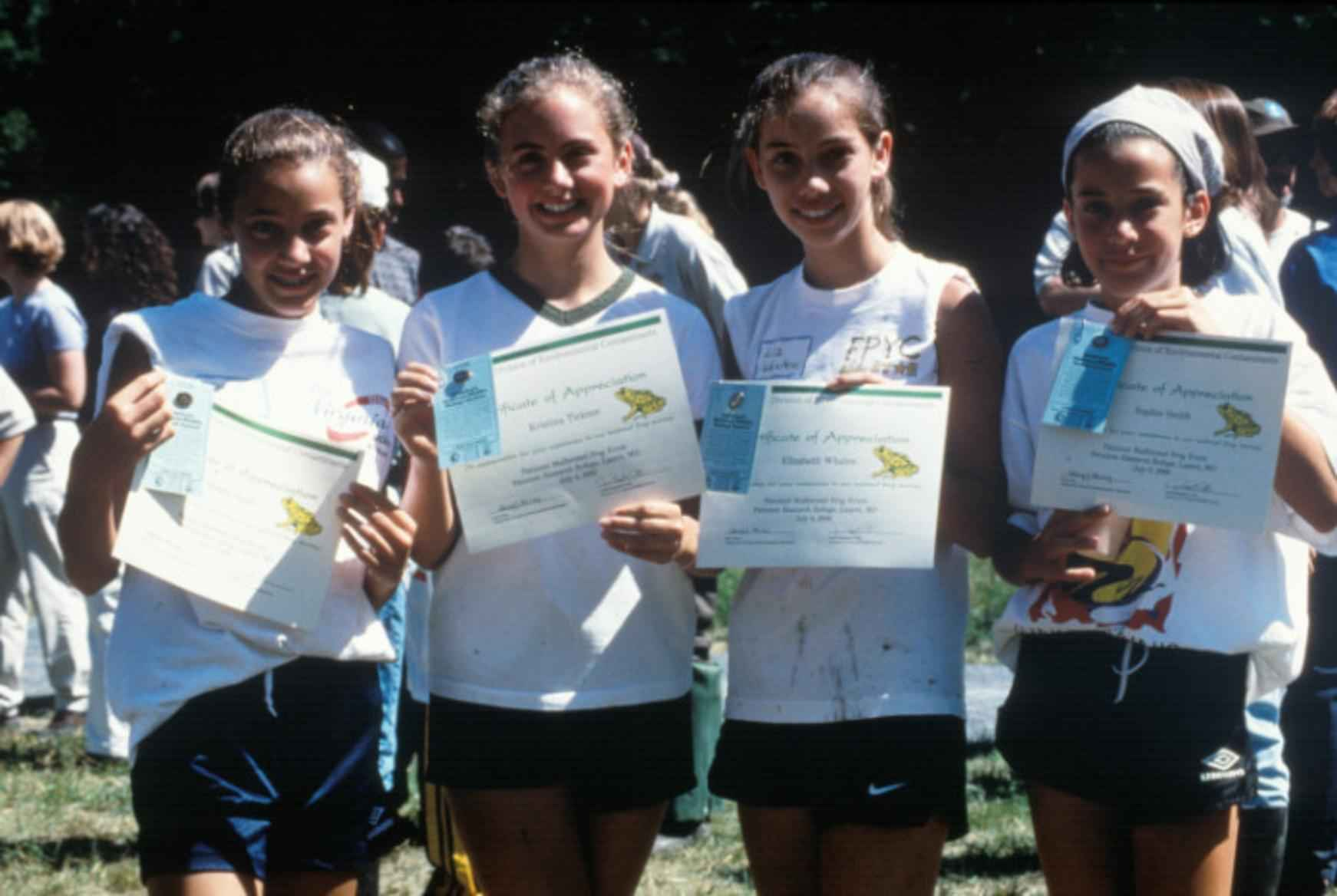
- Maryland Girl Scouts

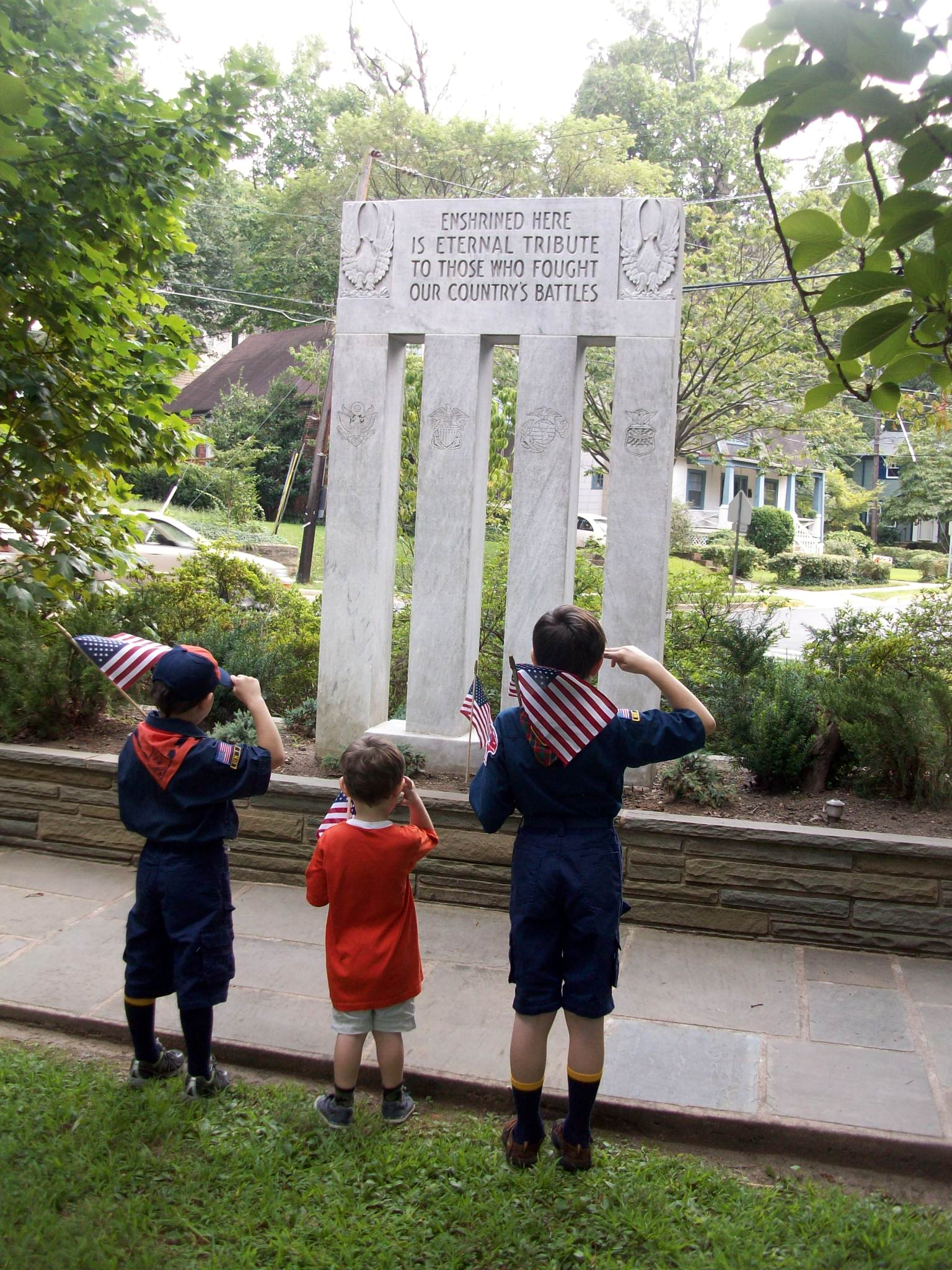
- Memorial Day in Takoma Park

Scouting in Maryland has a long history, from the 1910s to the present day, serving millions of youth with activities that have adapted to the changing cultural environment but have always been rooted in an active outdoor program.

== Early history (1910-1950) ==
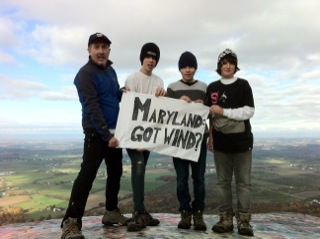
Boy Scouts on Quirauk Mountain

Scouting in Maryland dates back to the earliest days of the movement. Robert S. Garrett (1875–1961) was among the twenty-five men who organized the National Council of the Boy Scouts of America in 1910. Mr. Garrett was a Baltimore civic leader, prominent philanthropist, explorer and Olympic champion. Named in the federal charter of 1916, Mr. Garrett served on the BSA National Executive Board from 1912 to 1919 and remained a member of the National Council until his death. He was one of the original nine Baltimore recipients of the Silver Beaver Award in 1931.

The first seven Scout Troops in Baltimore were granted charters by Scout Commissioner H. Laurance Eddy (1884–1962) on September 9, 1910. (Eddy's role as Scout Commissioner was the combined predecessor to the roles of Council Commissioner and Council Scout Executive.) A month prior, Robert Garrett and Laurance Eddy ensured that a patrol of eight Scouts from Mount Washington Troop 1 (organized earlier that summer) attended the first National Boy Scout camp held at Silver Bay on Lake George.

The Maryland Council of Scouting America was duly incorporated on May 9, 1911. The initial board of directors was composed of Robert Garrett, William H. Morris, James Carey Jr., Frank Smith and Stuart S. Janney. The first Scout headquarters was at 512 Continental Trust Building (now One Calvert Plaza.) Almost immediately, the council was referred to as the “Baltimore Council.” From 1911 through 1921, the Baltimore Council operated as a department of the Baltimore Social Service Corporation, sharing a finance director, advisory board and other office support with the Public Athletic League, the Social Workers’ Bureau and other Garrett-supported civic endeavors.

By 1917, the Baltimore Council provided less support beyond Central Maryland as local councils were created in Frostburg, Westminster, Salisbury and Frederick.

The Frostburg Council was founded in 1917 and closed in 1919.

The Westminster Council was founded in 1917 and closed in 1919.

The Salisbury Council was founded in 1917 and closed in 1921.

The Frederick Council (#222) was founded in 1917 and changed its name in 1921 to the Frederick County Council (#732) in 1926. In 1928 it changed its name again to the Francis Scott Key Council (#732) and finally merged with the Washington DC Council (#732) in 1930.

The Washington DC Council (#082) was founded in 1913 and changed its name in 1937 to the National Capital Area Council (#082) in 1926.

The Baltimore Area Council (#220) was incorporated on May 9, 1911, as the Maryland Council but immediately referred to as the Baltimore Council (#220). The Baltimore Council was first referred to as the Baltimore Area Council beginning in 1926.

The Washington County Council (#221) was founded in 1927 and changed its name in 1939 to the Washington Area Council (#221) in 1939. In 1956 it changed its name again to the Mason-Dixon Council (#221).

The Cumberland Council (#757) was founded 1926. In 1938 it changed its name to the Potomac Council (#757), It merged in 2014 with Laurel Highlands Council.

The Order of the Arrow Nentico Lodge was established in 1922 by E. Urner Goodman. The 1923 National Order of the Arrow Lodge Meeting was held at Baltimore, Maryland. In the early 1920s, there were several camps named Rodney in the Delmarva area. However, the current Rodney Scout Reservation was established in 1921. In Severna Park, was Camp Linstead, the camp of Nentico Lodge in its early years.

== Boy Scouts of America ==
There are currently six Boy Scouts of America (BSA) local councils serving the youth of Maryland. All the councils are within the Northeast Region of the BSA.

=== Baltimore Area Council ===
Baltimore Area Council #220
- Baltimore Area Council
- Owner: Boy Scouts of America
- Headquarters: Baltimore, MD
- Website baltimorebsa.org

Baltimore Area Council partners with approximately 800 community-based organizations providing programs to more than 11,880 youth each year. Baltimore Area Council operates three full service Scout Shops either directly or thru license with the National Council, Boy Scouts of America in Baltimore City, Hanover and Whiteford in Harford County, Maryland.

In 2008, Baltimore Area Council announced ten top initiative programs to highlight the Boy Scouts of America 100th Anniversary in 2010. The Top Ten Initiatives are: Star-Spangled Camporee at Fort McHenry and surrounding City Parks, Scout Sunday And Sabbath, Anniversary Black Tie Gala, Gathering of Eagles, Flag Ceremonies, the 100 Great Moments in Baltimore Area Scouting History, Birthday Card Contest, Scouting Mural/Mosaic Project and the 100th Anniversary Service Project.

In February 2009, the Star-Spangled Banner Flag or the Great Garrison Flag (also known as the 15 Star Flag) was officially adopted as the Official U.S. Flag of the Baltimore Area Council by authority of the Council Executive Board. A public ceremony was conducted on February 8, 2009, on the occasion of the 99th Anniversary of the incorporation of the Boy Scouts of America in Washington, D.C., by William D. Boyce, a Chicago publisher. Representatives of Scout Units, Districts, the council and the public were on hand to commemorate the adoption at the Shapiro Scout Service Center. This was done in anticipation of the bicentennial commemoration at Fort McHenry in 2014 of the battle which inspired Francis Scott Key to write his inspirational poem which later became the national anthem, The Star-Spangled Banner.

In 2023, the Baltimore Area Council (BAC) supported 11,886 youth members comprising 408 units (Cub Scout Packs, Scouts BSA Troops, Venturing Crews, Sea Scout Ships, and Explorer Posts). There were 427 scouts, both male and female, that earned scoutings highest rank of Eagle Scout in 2023; and that year BAC scouts also earned 17,357 Merit Badges. Over 9,730 Scouts in BAC contributed 105,047 volunteer hours in their Central Maryland communities, and collected 120,000 pounds of food for local food banks through BSA's 2023 Scouting for Food campaign.

==== Organization ====
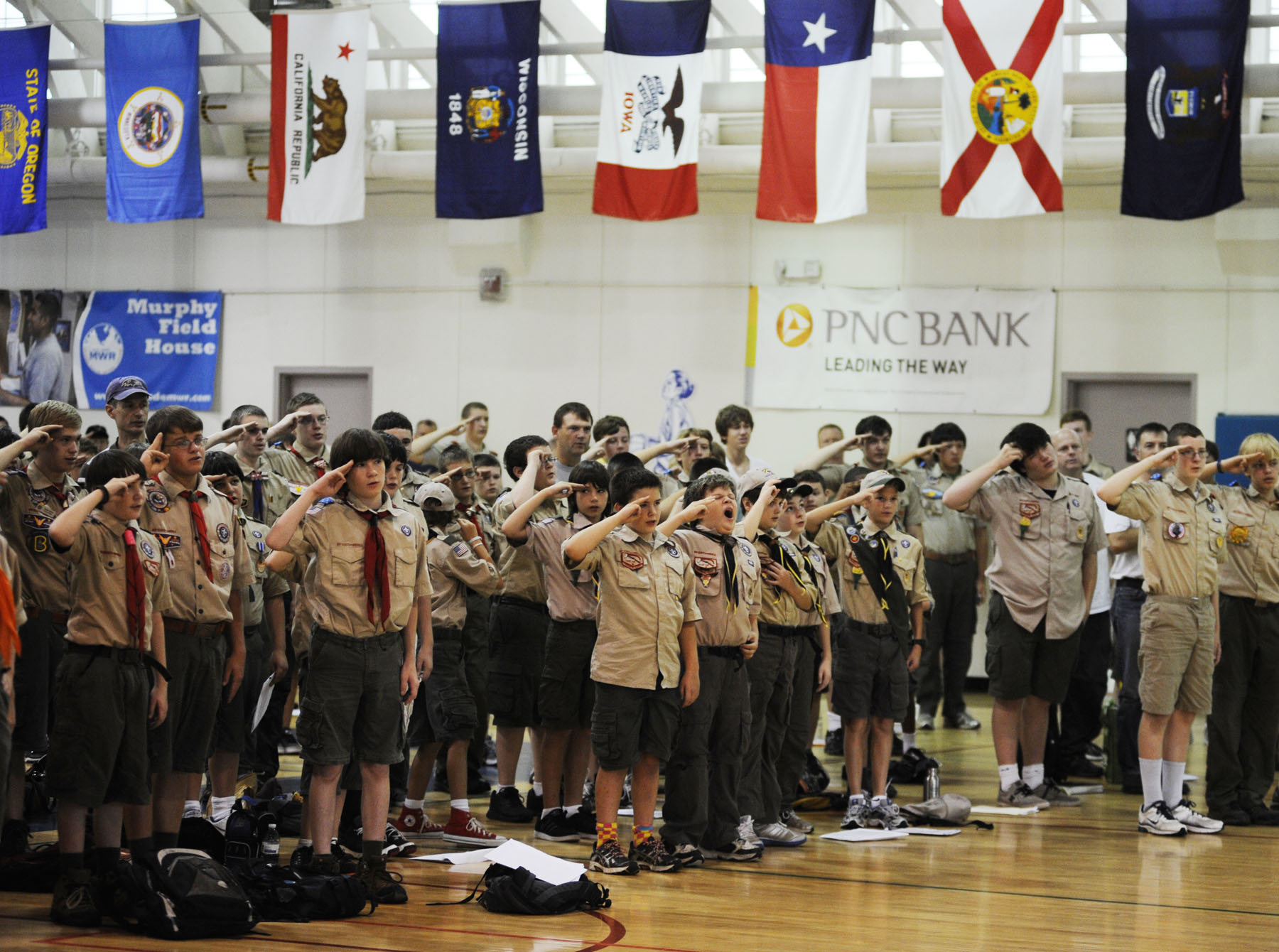
Fort Meade hosts Boy Scouts STEM day

The Baltimore Area Council includes seven districts:

- Arrowhead District (Baltimore County West of Falls Road)
- Carroll District (Carroll County)
- Fort McHenry District (Baltimore City)
- Gunpowder Falls District (Baltimore County East of Falls Road)
- Harford District (Harford District)
- National Pike District (Howard County)
- River Hawk District (Anne Arundel County)

==== Camps ====
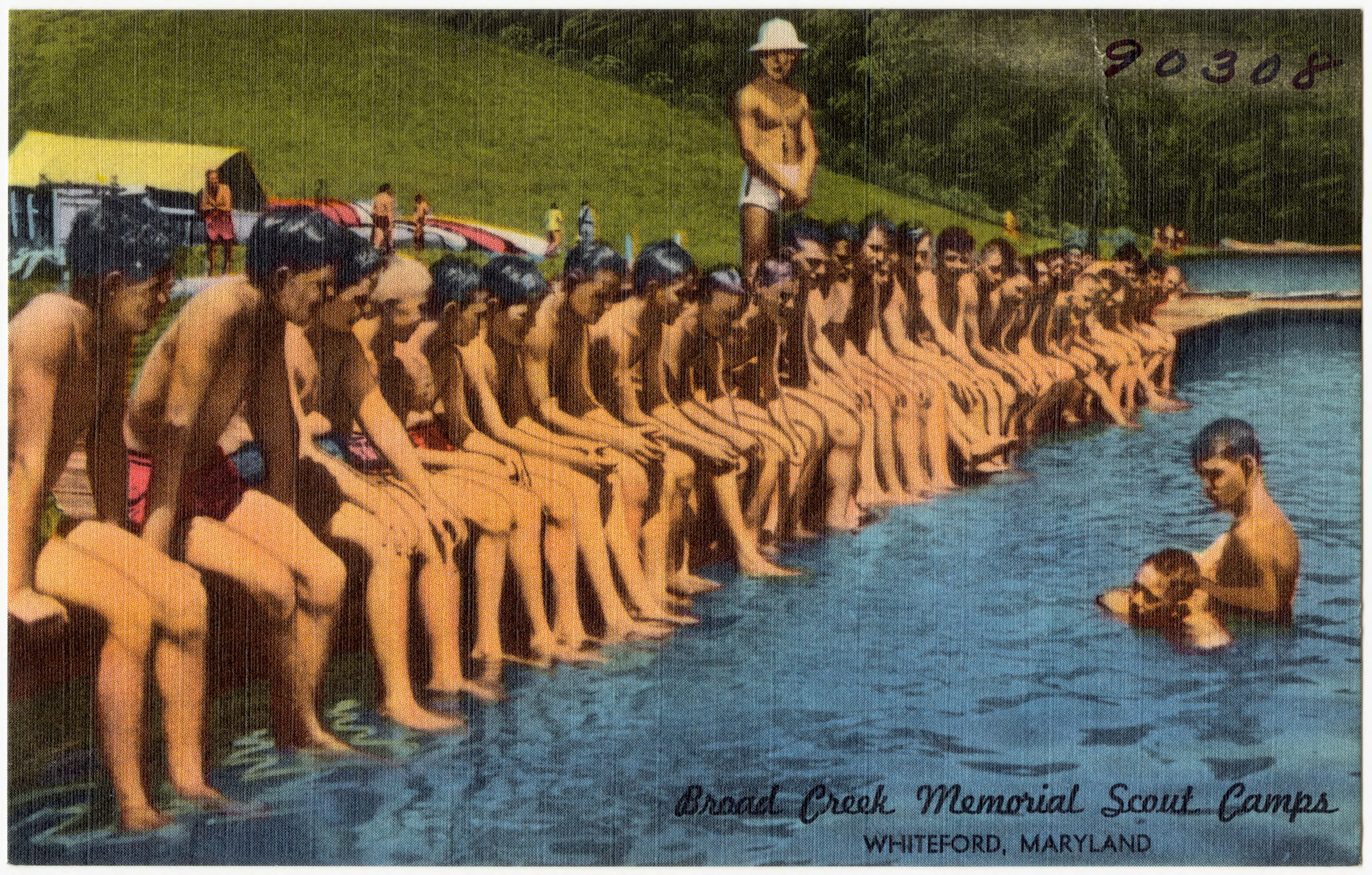
Postcard by the Tichnor Brothers

In 2023, total attendance at Broad Creek Memorial Scout Reservation was 23,950 youth (boys and girls) and adults. Broad Creek Memorial Scout Reservation (commonly called "Broad Creek") consists of three major camps, Camps Saffran, Spencer, and Oest. Lake Straus was formed in 1948 when Susquehanna River tributary Broad Creek was dammed.

Broad Creek campsites include cabins, adirondacks, tent sites, and outpost sites. Camp facilities include dining halls with kitchens, climbing tower, boat docks/ramps (kayaks, canoes, SUP, motor boats), archery and BB/rifle ranges, open fields, wooded areas, water access, and more.

=== Del-Mar-Va Council ===
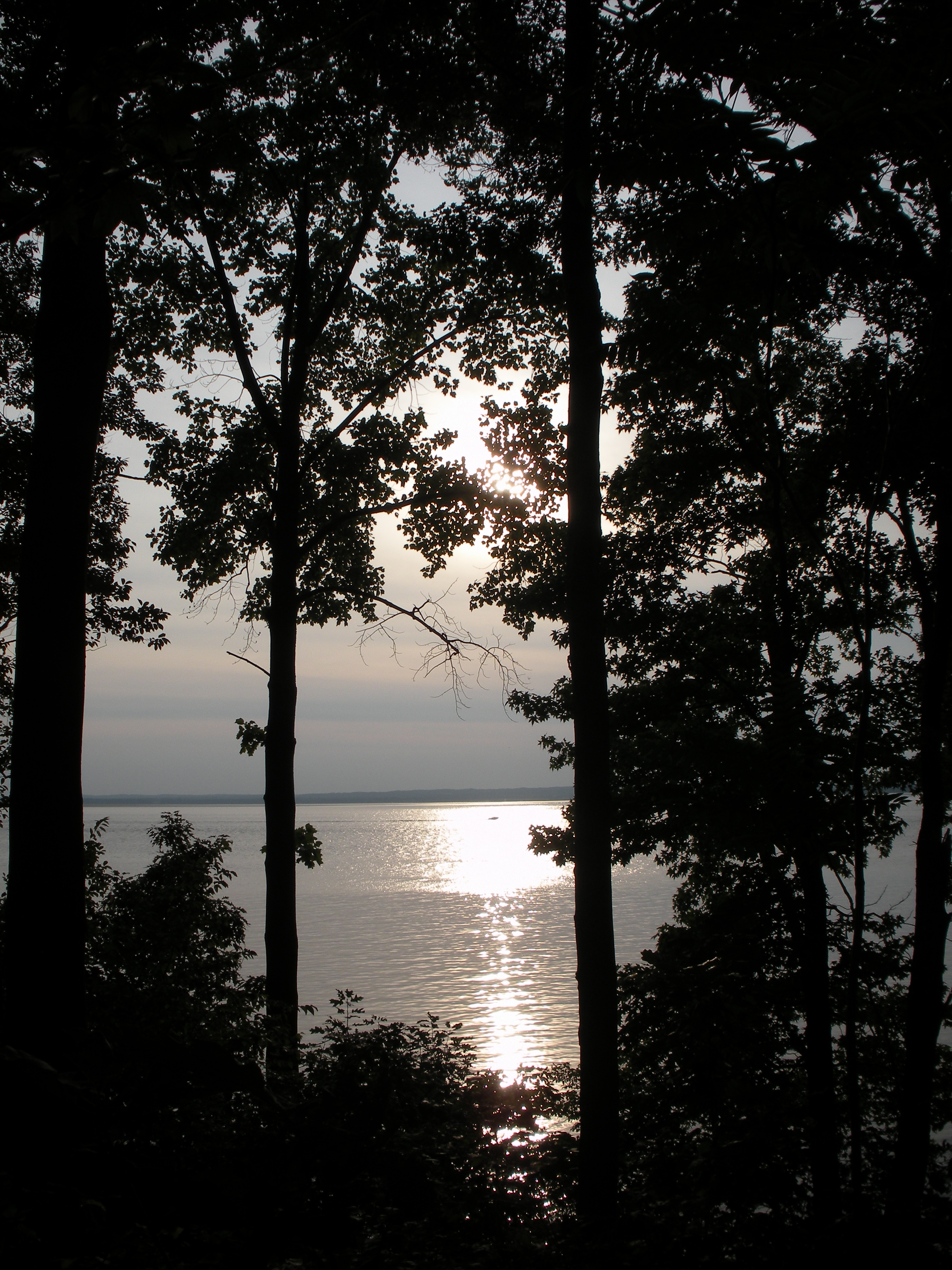
Camp Rodney

Del-Mar-Va Council serves Scouts in Delaware and the eastern shore portions (east of the Chesapeake Bay) of Maryland and Virginia.

Rodney Scout Reservation, also known as Camp Rodney or simply RSR, is a Scouts BSA camp located near North East, Maryland. Along with Henson Scout Reservation, it is one of the two main Scout camps in the Del-Mar-Va Council. Covering 900 acres (3.6 km^{2}) including the Bull Mountain Wilderness Area, it shares a long border with the woodlands of Elk Neck State Park. Along with Broad Creek Reservation, Rodney has placed much of its land into conservation easements for permanent legal protection from residential or commercial development. A number of facilities and campsites directly overlook the Chesapeake Bay which is used for an active aquatics program.

=== Laurel Highlands Council ===
Laurel Highlands Council serves youth in the Pittsburgh and surrounding areas, Allegany and Garrett Counties in Maryland and Mineral, Hampshire, Hardy, and Grant Counties in West Virginia.

=== National Capital Area Council ===
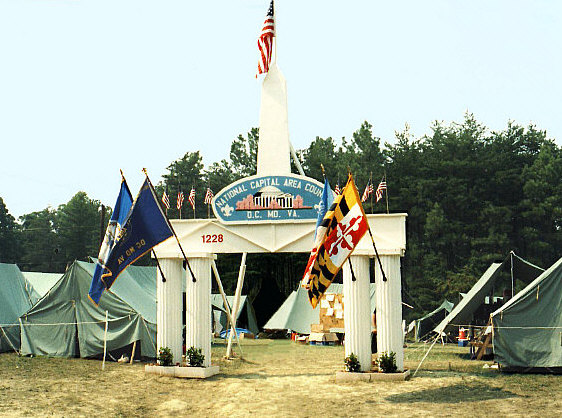
Council gateway during the 1993 National Scout Jamboree held at Fort A.P. Hill

The National Capital Area Council (NCAC) is a local council within the Northeast Region and serves Scouts in the Washington, D.C., Maryland, Virginia, and the United States Virgin Islands. The council offers extensive training, and administrative support to units. It is rated as a "Class 100" council by the National Council (headquarters office), which denotes that the NCAC is among the very largest in the country. Chartered in 1911, it is also one of the oldest. The council is divided into 23 districts serving ten counties in Northern Virginia, six counties in Maryland, the District of Columbia, and the US Virgin Islands. The council has a 2.5 to 1 ratio of youth members to adult leaders, which is among the highest of all the councils. The youth retention rate approaches 80%.

=== Chester County Council ===
The Chester County Council serves Chester County, Pennsylvania and part of Cecil County, Maryland in that state's northeast corner. It is one of the oldest councils in the nation. The council's Camp Horseshoe straddles the Mason–Dixon line between these two counties.

=== Mason-Dixon Council ===
Mason-Dixon Council #221
- Owner: Boy Scouts of America
- Headquarters: Hagerstown, MD
- Website mdcscouting.org

The Mason-Dixon Council served southern Franklin and Fulton Counties in Pennsylvania and neighboring Washington County in Maryland.

Sinoquipe Scout Reservation (Sinoquipe means Builder of Men) is a remote 500-acre (2.0 km^{2}) forested mountain facility with a 10-acre (40,000 m^{2}) lake located in the rural area two miles (3 km) from the village of Fort Littleton, Pennsylvania in Fulton County. It is located 120 miles (190 km) from Baltimore, 115 miles (185 km) from DC, and 65 miles (105 km) from Harrisburg, Pennsylvania.

On July 11, 2023, the Mason-Dixon Council voted to merge into the Shenandoah Area Council based in Winchester, Virginia.

==== Organization ====
The Mason Dixon Council is made up of three districts:

- Great Cove District - Fulton County, PA
- Washington County District - Washington County, MD
- Tuscarora District - Franklin County, PA

==== Order of the Arrow ====
The Order of the Arrow lodge for the Mason-Dixon Council is Guneukitschik Lodge No. 317.

== Girl Scouts of the USA ==
Girl Scouting in Maryland
- Map of Girl Scout Councils in Maryland

Four Girl Scout Councils serve Maryland but only one is headquartered in the state.

=== Girl Scouts of Black Diamond Council ===
Serves Maryland girls in Garrett County.

=== Girl Scouts of Central Maryland ===
Girl Scouts of Central Maryland
- Headquarters: Baltimore, Maryland
- Country: United States
- Website www.gscm.org

The only council with headquarters in Maryland, it serves over 30,000 girls in Baltimore City, Anne Arundel, Baltimore, Carroll, Harford and Howard Counties.

It originated the Girl Scouts Beyond Bars program that tries to maintain ties between female prisoners and their daughters by having them participate in Girl Scouts. The program has been replicated in some 25 other Girl Scout Councils.

=== Girl Scouts of the Chesapeake Bay Council ===
Serves Maryland girls on the Delmarva Peninsula.

=== Girl Scout Council of the Nation's Capital ===
This council supports girls in several Maryland counties: Calvert, Charles, Montgomery, Prince George's, Frederick, St. Mary's, Allegany, and Washington.

== International Scouting in Maryland ==
An international Polish Scout Jamboree with several thousand participants took place in Maryland in the summer of 2006, composed primarily of Scouts-in-Exile from Canada and the United States. It was held at Baltimore Area Council's camp at Broad Creek Scout Reservation in an area known as Camp Spencer.

== See also ==
- Scouting in the District of Columbia
- Scouting in Virginia
