= 1993 National Scout Jamboree =

- 1993 National Scout Jamboree patch
- Location: Fort A.P. Hill, Virginia
- Country: United States
- Date: August 4, 1993, to August 10, 1993
- Attendance: 34,449 Scouts

The 1993 National Scout Jamboree was the 13th national Scout jamboree of the Boy Scouts of America and was held from August 4-10, 1993, at Fort A.P. Hill, Virginia.

== Statistics ==
This event was attended by 34,449 scouts.

== List of sub-camps ==
The 1993 National Scout Jamboree was divided into four regional encampments which consisted of a total of 19 sub-camps. Each subcamp consisted of approximately 1300 participants each dispersed among 30-40 troops. Each troop occupied a campsite with dimensions of approximately 90 feet (27 m) X 90 feet. Each subcamp had a special patch depicting a historical flag.

=== Central region ===
Subcamp 1: Green Mountain
Subcamp 2: Rhode Island
Subcamp 3: Guilford Courthouse
Subcamp 4: French Fleur-de-lis

=== Western region ===
Subcamp 5: Union Jack
Subcamp 6: Grand Union
Subcamp 7: Fremont
Subcamp 8: Sons of Liberty
Subcamp 9: Gadsden

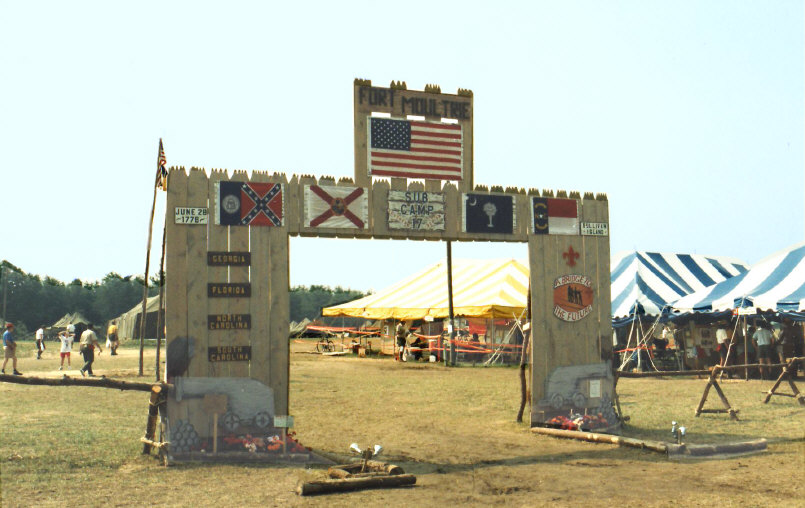
Southern region subcamp 17 gateway, portraying Fort Moultrie, South Carolina

=== Southern region ===
Subcamp 15: Navy Jack
Subcamp 16: Serapis
Subcamp 17: Fort Moultrie
Subcamp 18: Lions & Castles
Subcamp 19: Commodore Perry

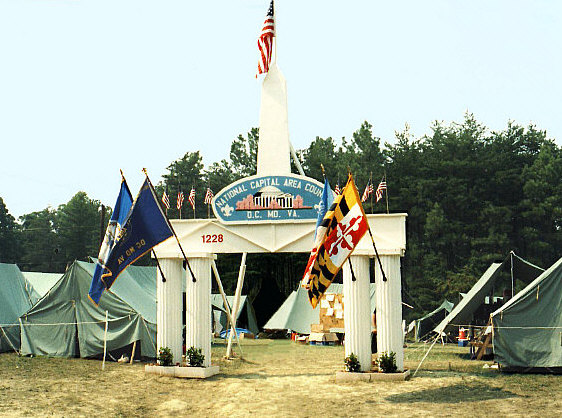
National Capital Area Council's gateway

=== Northeast region ===
Subcamp 10: Bunker Hill
Subcamp 11: Bennington
Subcamp 12: Washington Cruisers
Subcamp 13: Phila, Light Horse
Subcamp 14: Taunton

== Program ==
Jamboree attendees were able to participate in a number of activities. Singer Lee Greenwood and performance group Up With People performed at the opening ceremony, and singer Louise Mandrell performed at the closing ceremony. A list of the main activities is given below.

=== Action centers ===
- "Action Alley"
- Air-Rifle
- Archery
- "Bikathalon"
- "Buckskin Games"
- "Confidence Course"
- Motocross
- "Patrol Challenge"
- Pioneering
- Trap Shooting
- Rappelling

=== Remote centers ===
- Conservation
- Fishing - More than 20,000 bass, channel catfish, bluegill and other fish were stocked in Fishhook Lake.

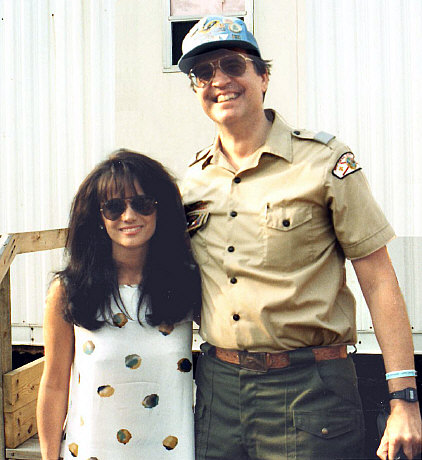
Singer Louise Mandrell at the 1993 Jamboree with a visiting National Council representative from the West Central Florida Council

=== Aquatics ===
- "Raft Encounter"
- Racing Shell Run
- Canoe Sprint
- "Kayak Fun"
- Canoe Slalom
- "Discover Scuba"
- "Snorkel Search"

=== Exhibits and displays ===
- National Exhibits
- Merit Badge Midway
- Arts and Science Expo
- Brownsea Island Camp
- Daily Stage Shows
- Amateur Radio Station

== Order of the Arrow Jamboree Rendezvous ==
The Order of the Arrow Jamboree Rendezvous was held on the evening of Monday, August 9.

== Severe weather ==
A major rainstorm occurred on Friday, August 6 which caused localized flooding and necessitated the cancellation of all Jamboree activities for the afternoon. This storm deposited over 3 inches (76 mm) of rain on the jamboree site in a 13-hour period.

== Newspaper ==
A daily newspaper entitled Jamboree Today was distributed to all jamboree participants to inform them of events at the jamboree.
