= Scouting in Washington, D.C. =

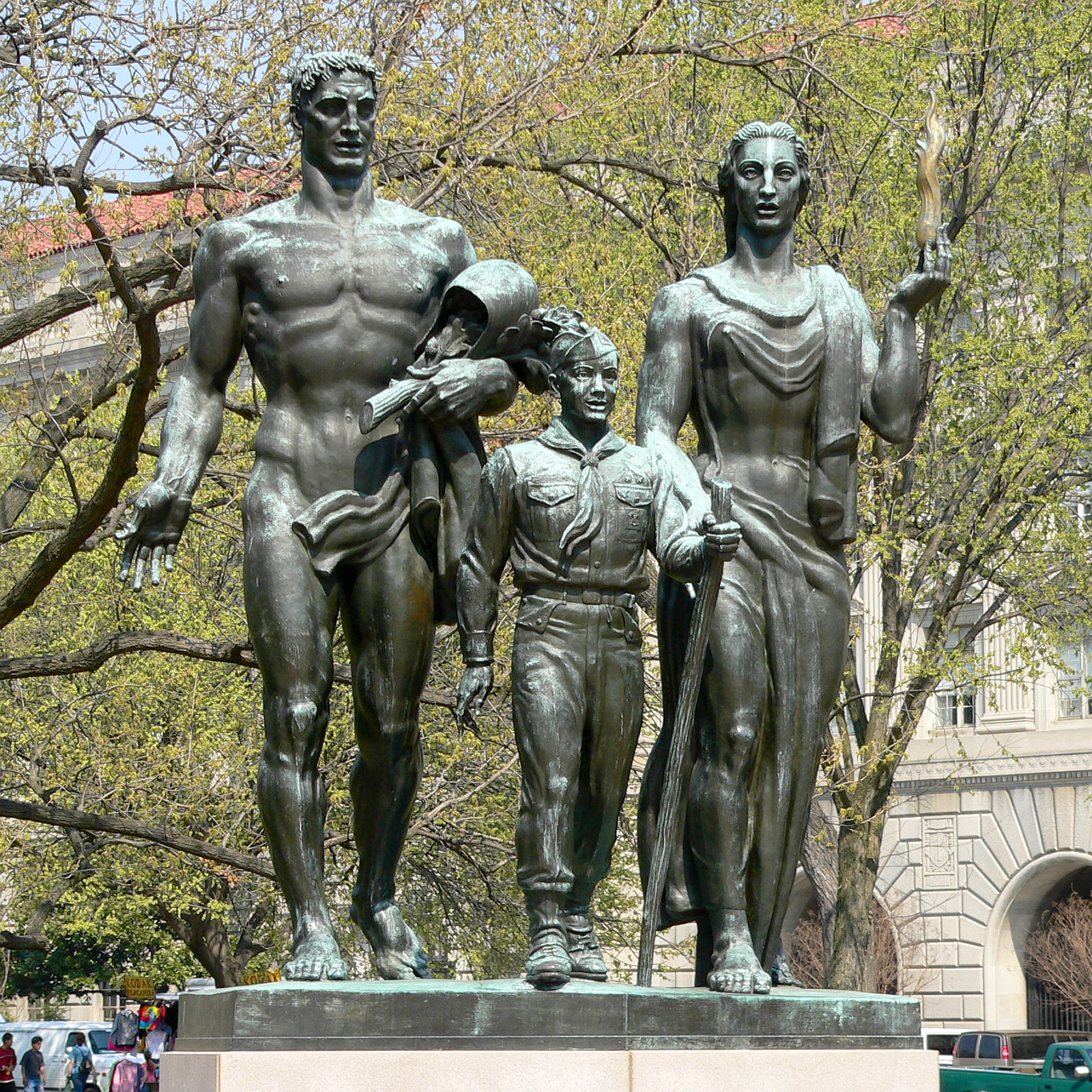
- Boy Scout Memorial in President's Park

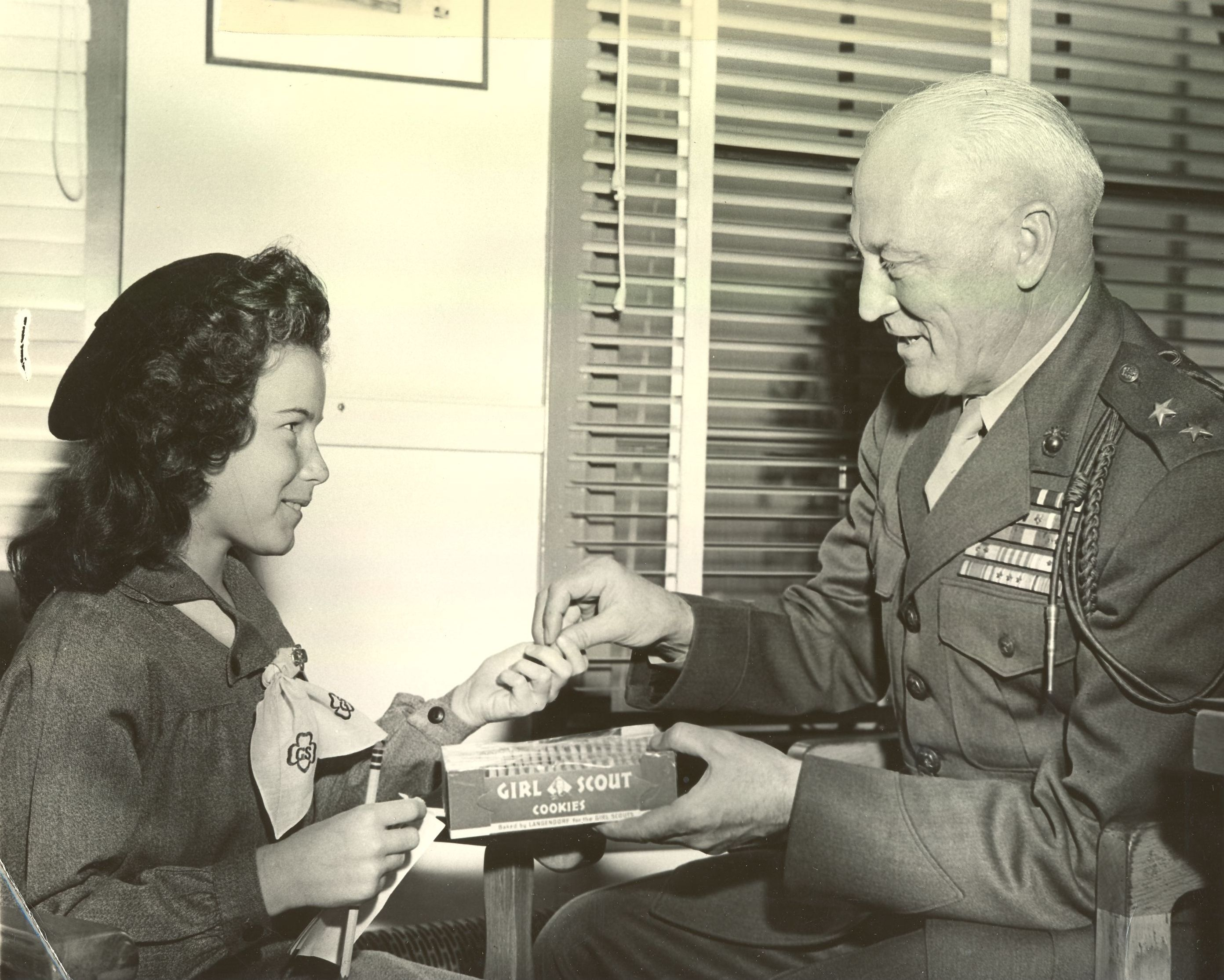

Scouting in Washington, D.C. (District of Columbia) has a long history, from the 1910s to the present day, serving thousands of youth in programs that suit the environment in which they live.

== History ==
Washington, D.C., was set to host the 1935 National Scout Jamboree, celebrating the 25th anniversary of the BSA, however it was canceled due to a polio epidemic, so the 1937 National Scout Jamboree became the first jamboree and was held there.

On March 11, 1962, then World Chief Guide Lady Olave Baden-Powell visited for the 50th anniversary of Girl Scouts.

== Scouting America ==
=== National Capital Area Council ===
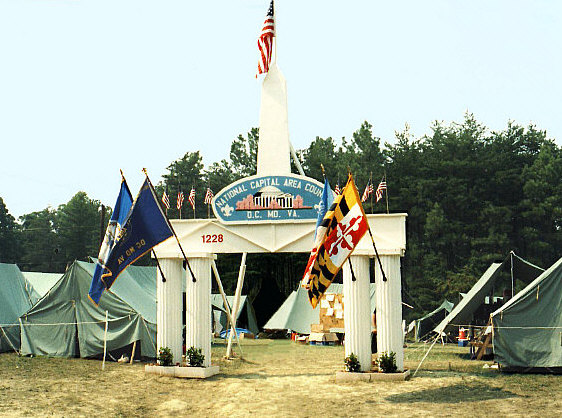
National Capital Area Council gateway at the 1993 National Scout Jamboree

The National Capital Area Council (NCAC) serves scouts in the Washington, D.C., Maryland, Virginia, and the United States Virgin Islands. The council offers extensive training, and administrative support to units. It is rated as a "Class 100" council by the National Council (headquarters office), which denotes that the NCAC is among the very largest in the country. Chartered in 1911, it is also one of the oldest. The council is divided into 23 districts serving ten counties in Northern Virginia, six counties in Maryland, the District of Columbia, and the US Virgin Islands. The council has a 2.5 to 1 ratio of youth members to adult leaders, which is among the highest of all the councils. The youth retention rate approaches 80%.

== Girl Scouting ==
From 1913 until 1916 Washington was the national headquarters of the Girl Scouts and it was here that the first National Council meeting was held in 1915. In 1916 the headquarters moved to New York City.

=== Girl Scout Council of the Nation's Capital ===
Girl Scout Council of the Nation's Capital serves girls in Washington, D.C., and large parts of Maryland, Virginia, and West Virginia.

== International Scouting units in the District of Columbia ==
Külföldi Magyar Cserkészszövetség Hungarian Scouting maintains a troop in Washington.

The First Canadian Embassy Scout Group is sponsored by the Canadian Embassy with permission of Scouts Canada and the Boy Scouts of America. Membership is restricted to non-US citizens and is open to both girls and boys.

== See also ==
- Boy Scout Memorial
