= Council Service Territories =

Boy Scouts of America by region

- Owner: Scouting America
- Headquarters: Irving, Texas
- Founded: 2021

Council Service Territories (CSTs) are the administrative regions of Scouting America. Previously, the term “region” was used until June 2021, when the organization moved to “National Service Territories”. The transition from four regions to sixteen National Service Territories was made as an effort to reduce staff plus save costs. At the territory level, there is minimal staff and no board or committee structure.

In 2024, NSTs were renamed to Council Service Territories and several CST boundaries were updated. Additionally, two territories were merged into adjacent ones, resulting in a total of 14 Council Service Territories.

== Background ==
Until 2021, operations of Scouting America were divided into four regions for administrative purposes - Central, Southern, Western, and Northeast. Each region was then subdivided into areas. Each region had a volunteer president, assisted by volunteer officers and board members, and the day-to-day work of Scouting was managed by the regional director, assistant and associate regional directors, and area directors. Regions and areas were subdivisions of the National Council and did not have a corporate status separate from Scouting America.

== NST ==
Churchill Plan Restructure of Councils by National Service Territories Council Name Listing
NST 1 14 councils	NST 2 14 councils	NST 3 20 councils	NST 4 15 councils	NST 5 12 councils	NST 6 14 councils	NST 7 16 councils	NST 8 15 councils
Great Alaska (C300/G3)	Great Southwest (C400/G2)	Southern Sierra (C500/G3)	Hawkeye Area (C400/G2)	Great Rivers (C400/G1)	Bay Lakes (C200/G2)	Texas Trails (C500/G2)	Golden Spread (C400/G2)
Mountain West (C400/G1)	Greater Wyoming (C500/G2)	Ventura County (C400/G3)	Illowa (C400/G2)	Santa Fe Trail (C500/G1)	Prairielands (C500/G2)	Capitol Area (C200/G2)	Arbuckle Area (C500/G1)
Crater Lake (C400/G2)	Pikes Peak (C300/G2)	Pacific Skyline (C300/G4)	Mid-Iowa (C300/G2)	Overland Trails (C500/G1)	Pathway to Adventure (C100/G3)	Istrouma Area (C400/G2)	Cherokee Area [OK] (C500/G1)
Oregon Trail (C400/G2)	Denver Area (C100/G2)	Sequoia (C300/G2)	Northeast Iowa (C500/G1)	Heart of America (C100/G2)	Rainbow (C400/G3)	Three Rivers (C500/G2)	Circle Ten (C100/G3)
Mount Baker (C400/G3)	Yucca (C500/G2)	Verdugo Hills (C500/G3)	Chippewa Valley (C400/G2)	Cornhusker (C400/G1)	Glacier's Edge (C400/G2)	South Texas (C400/G2)	De Soto Area (C500/G1)
Midnight Sun (C500/G3)	Montana (C300/G1)	Aloha (C300/G2)	Northern Lights (C300/G1)	Mid-America (C200/G2)	Three Harbors (C300/G2)	Bay Area (C400/G3)	Cimarron (C500/G1)
Grand Teton (C300/G1)	Longs Peak (C300/G2)	Long Beach Area (C400/G3)	Voyageurs Area (C500/G2)	Coronado Area (C400/G1)	W.D. Boyce (C300/G2)	Rio Grande (C500/G2)	Westark Area (C400/G1)
Blue Mountain (C500/G3)	Las Vegas Area (C300/G2)	Greater Los Angeles Area (C100/G3)	Gateway Area (C500/G1)	Ozark Trails (C400/G1)	Mississippi Valley (C400/G1)	Sam Houston Area (C100/G3)	Longhorn (C200/G2)
Far East (C500/G2)	Crossroads of the West (C300/G2)	Greater Yosemite (C400/G3)	Twin Valley (C400/G2)	Pony Express (C400/G1)	Blackhawk Area (C300/G2)	Evangeline Area (C400/G2)	Quapaw Area (C300/G1)
Cascade Pacific (C200/G2)	Rocky Mountain (C400/G2)	Piedmont [CA] (C500/G4)	Black Hills Area (C500/G1)	Greater St. Louis Area (C100/G2)	Abraham Lincoln (C400/G2)	Calcasieu Area (C500/G2)	South Plains (C500/G2)
Chief Seattle (C200/G3)	Nevada Area (C400/G2)	California Inland Empire (C300/G3)	Gamehaven (C500/G2)	Jayhawk Area (C400/G1)	Three Fires (C300/G3)	Buffalo Trail (C300/G2)	Last Frontier (C300/G1)
Inland Northwest (C300/G2)	Conquistador (C500/G1)	Golden Empire (C300/G3)	Central Minnesota (C400/G2)	Quivira (C300/G1)	Northeast Illinois (C300/G3)	Louisiana Purchase (C400/G1)	Caddo Area (C400/G1)
Pacific Harbors (C300/G3)	Grand Canyon (C200/G2)	San Diego-Imperial (C200/G3)	Sioux (C400/G2)		Potawatomi Area (C400/G2)	Southeast Louisiana (C300/G2)	Indian Nations (C200/G2)
Grand Columbia (C500/G2)	Catalina (C400/G2)	Silicon Valley Monterey Bay (C200/G4)	Northern Star (C100/G3)		Samoset (C300/G2)	Texas Southwest (C500/G1)	East Texas Area (C400/G2)
		Golden Gate Area (C100/G4)	Winnebago (C500/G1)			Alamo Area (C200/G2)	Northwest Texas (C500/G1)
		Marin (C400/G4)				Norwela (C500/G1)	
		Orange County (C100/G3)					
		Los Padres (C300/G3)					
		Redwood Empire (C500/G3)					
		Western Los Angeles County (C100/G3)					

Council Name Listing
NST 9 17 councils	NST 10 14 councils	NST 11 15 councils	NST 12 15 councils	NST 13 16 councils	NST 14 20 councils	NST 15 20 councils	NST 16 15 councils
Great Trail (C300/G2)	Twin Rivers (C300/G2)	Katahdin Area (C400/G1)	Baltimore Area (C200/G2)	Columbia-Montour (C500/G2)	Northeast Georgia (C200/G2)	Central North Carolina (C400/G2)	Alabama-Florida (C500/G2)
Hoosier Trails (C400/G2)	Iroquois Trail (C500/G2)	Transatlantic (C400/G2)	National Capital Area (C100/G3)	Patriots' Path (C200/G3)	Atlanta Area (C100/G2)	Daniel Boone (C300/G1)	Southwest Florida (C400/G2)
Buckeye (C300/G2)	Baden-Powell (C400/G2)	Housatonic (C500/G3)	Moraine Trails (C500/G2)	Washington Crossing (C300/G3)	Greater Alabama (C200/G2)	Georgia-Carolina (C500/G2)	Pine Burr Area (C400/G1)
Dan Beard (C200/G2)	Greater Niagara Frontier (C300/G3)	Connecticut Rivers (C200/G3)	Buckskin (C400/G1)	Chester County (C300/G2)	Cherokee Area [TN] (C400/G1)	Coastal Carolina (C400/G2)	Andrew Jackson (C400/G1)
Lake Erie (C200/G2)	Allegheny Highlands (C500/G2)	Greenwich (C400/G4)	Del-Mar-Va (C200/G3)	Pennsylvania Dutch (C300/G2)	Chattahoochee (C400/G2)	Mecklenburg County (C300/G2)	North Florida (C200/G2)
Simon Kenton (C200/G2)	Five Rivers (C400/G2)	Heart of New England (C400/G3)	Bucktail (C500/G1)	Minsi Trails (C300/G2)	Pushmataha Area (C500/G1)	Indian Waters (C400/G1)	Choctaw Area (C500/G1)
Miami Valley (C400/G2)	Rip Van Winkle (C500/G2)	Daniel Webster (C200/G2)	French Creek (C500/G2)	New Birth of Freedom (C300/G2)	Flint River (C400/G2)	Pee Dee Area (C500/G2)	South Florida (C300/G3)
Buffalo Trace (C400/G2)	Theodore Roosevelt (C400/G3)	Mayflower (C300/G3)	Mountaineer Area (C500/G1)	Northeastern PA (C400/G1)	West Tennessee Area (C400/G1)	Piedmont [NC] (C300/G2)	Mobile Area (C500/G2)
Black Swamp Area (C400/G2)	Suffolk County (C400/G3)	Connecticut Yankee (C300/G3)	Westmoreland-Fayette (C400/G2)	Monmouth (C400/G3)	Sequoyah (C400/G1)	Tuscarora (C500/G1)	Central Florida (C200/G2)
Anthony Wayne Area (C400/G2)	Greater New York (C100/G4)	Pine Tree (C400/G2)	Mason-Dixon (C500/G2)	Northern New Jersey (C300/G4)	Great Smoky Mountain (C300/G2)	Old North State (C300/G2)	Gulf Stream (C300/G2)
Crossroads of America (C100/G2)	Seneca Waterways (C200/G2)	Narragansett (C200/G3)	Laurel Highlands (C200/G2)	Cradle of Liberty (C200/G3)	Blue Grass (C400/G1)	Blue Ridge (C300/G2)	Gulf Coast (C500/G2)
Sagamore (C400/G2)	Greater Hudson Valley (C200/G4)	Green Mountain (C400/G3)	Chief Cornplanter (C500/G1)	Hawk Mountain (C300/G2)	Lincoln Heritage (C200/G2)	East Carolina (C300/G1)	Puerto Rico (C400/G1)
Michigan Crossroads (C100/G2)	Longhouse (C400/G2)	Western Massachusetts (C500/G3)	Virginia Headwaters (C400/G2)	Juniata Valley (C500/G2)	Central Georgia (C500/G2)	Colonial Virginia (C400/G2)	Suwannee River Area (C500/G2)
La Salle (C400/G2)	Leatherstocking (C400/G2)	Spirit of Adventure (C200/G3)	Ohio River Valley (C500/G1)	Jersey Shore (C400/G3)	Chickasaw (C300/G2)	Occoneechee (C200/G2)	Greater Tampa Bay Area (C300/G2)
Tecumseh (C500/G2)		Cape Cod and Islands (C500/G2)	Shenandoah Area (C500/G2)	Garden State (C300/G3)	Tukabatchee Area (C400/G2)	Heart of Virginia (C300/G2)	South Georgia (C500/G1)
Erie Shores (C300/G2)				Susquehanna (C500/G2)	Middle Tennessee (C200/G2)	Blue Ridge Mountains (C200/G2)	
Muskingum Valley (C500/G2)					Northwest Georgia (C500/G2)	Palmetto (C400/G2)	
					Coastal Georgia (C400/G2)	Tidewater (C400/G2)	
					Yocona Area (C500/G1)	Cape Fear (C400/G2)	
					Black Warrior (C400/G2)	Old Hickory (C300/G2)	

Key Factors of Restructuring
1. Respect of council cultures and its volunteers, communities, state boundaries and natural geographic territories
2. Business commerce, traffic/highway patterns, and future growth trends
3. Optimize the level of service and support to local councils
Legend
C#/G# = Council Class/Grade (Note: An explanation of class and grade may be found at Scout councils)

== Previous region-based system ==
Previous Boy Scouts of America regions as of 1992

Until 2021, the Boy Scouts of America was divided into four regions for administrative purposes — Central, Southern, Western, and Northeast. Each region was then subdivided into areas. Each region had a volunteer president, assisted by volunteer officers and board members, and the day-to-day work of Scouting was managed by the regional director, assistant and associate regional directors, and area directors. Regions and areas were subdivisions of the National Council and did not have a corporate status separate from the BSA.

Regions were replaced by National Service Territories in June 2021 which were later renamed to Council Service Territories.

- Central Region - covered the states of Iowa, Illinois, Kansas, Michigan, Minnesota, Missouri, North Dakota, Ohio, Wisconsin, and parts of Indiana, Kentucky, Montana, Nebraska, South Dakota, Virginia, and West Virginia.
- Northeast Region - covered the northeastern states of Connecticut, Delaware, Maine, Maryland, Massachusetts, New Hampshire, New Jersey, New York, Pennsylvania, Rhode Island, Vermont, and the northern portion of Virginia. It also covered the District of Columbia, Puerto Rico, the Virgin Islands, and the Transatlantic Council.
- Southern Region - covered all of Alabama, Arkansas, Florida, Georgia, Louisiana, Mississippi, North Carolina, Oklahoma, South Carolina, and Tennessee, and parts of Indiana, Kentucky, Maryland, Texas, Virginia, and West Virginia.
- Western Region - covered all of Alaska, Arizona, California, Colorado, Hawaii, Idaho, Nevada, New Mexico, Oregon, Utah, Washington, and Wyoming, and parts of Montana, Nebraska, South Dakota, and Texas, as well as the countries of Japan, the Philippines, South Korea, Taiwan, and Thailand.

== See also ==
- List of councils (Boy Scouts of America)
