= Valley Forge (disambiguation) =

Valley Forge was a Continental Army winter encampment during the American Revolutionary War.

Valley Forge may also refer to:

== Places ==
- Valley Forge National Historical Park, previously Valley Forge State Park
- Valley Forge, Pennsylvania, the small community in southeastern Pennsylvania that lent the encampment its name
- Valley Forge, York County, Pennsylvania, a small community in south-central Pennsylvania
- Valley Forge State Forest, now William Penn State Forest
- Valley Forge General Hospital, open from 1950 to 1975
- Valley Forge, Missouri, a ghost town

== Education ==
- Valley Forge Military Academy and College, in Wayne, Pennsylvania
- University of Valley Forge, in Phoenixville, Pennsylvania
- Valley Forge High School, in Parma Heights, Ohio
- Valley Forge Academy, a former private school in Amite, Louisiana

== Entertainment ==
- "Valley Forge" (song), by Iced Earth
- "Valley Forge (Demo)", a deleted song from the musical Hamilton, on the 2016 album The Hamilton Mixtape
- Valley Forge, a fictional spacecraft in the film Silent Running
- Valley Forge, a troop transporter in Robert Heinlein's novel Starship Troopers
- Valley Forge (play), by Maxwell Anderson
- Valley Forge (film), a 1975 TV movie
- Valley Forge, a novel by MacKinley Kantor

== Other uses ==
- USS Valley Forge, any of several ships of the US Navy
- Valley Forge Pilgrimage, an annual event of the Boy Scouts of America
- Camp Valley Forge, a Girl Scout camp in Valley Forge, Pennsylvania
- Valley Forge (train), a former Amtrak passenger train
