= Camp Archbald =

Coordinates: 41.7511882°N 75.8068585°W

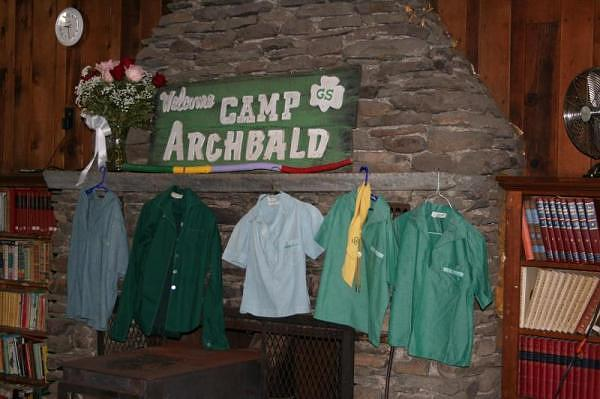
The Lodge fireplace, decorated for the 85th Anniversary of Camp in 2005.

Camp Archbald is a Girl Scout camp in Brooklyn Township, Susquehanna County, Pennsylvania. It encompasses 230 acres (0.93 km^{2}), including a 45-acre (180,000 m^{2}) lake (Lake Ely). Established in 1920, it is the second oldest Girl Scout camp in America. (Only Camp Bonnie Brae in Massachusetts has been serving girls longer.) Camp Archbald falls under the jurisdiction of Girl Scouts in the Heart of Pennsylvania, which operates 7 camp facilities in Northeastern and Central. Pennsylvania.

Activities at Camp Archbald include swimming and boating in Ely Lake, a low ropes course, a climbing tower, a zipline, gaga, and tetherball. Campers may stay in cabins, tents, or lodges.

== See also ==
- Scouting in Pennsylvania
