= Camp Anawanna =

Camp Anawanna may be:

- Camp Anawanna, fictional camp featured in the early-1990s Nickelodeon children's television series Salute Your Shorts
- Camp Anawanna (Pennsylvania), a Laurel Highlands Council Boy Scout camp in Western Pennsylvania
- Kutsher's Camp Anawana near Monticello, New York
- Camp Anawanna, a band from Denton, TX
