= Huntington Council =

Huntington Council may be:

- Huntington Council (New York)
- Huntington Council (West Virginia)
