= Appalachian Council =

Appalachian Council may be:

- Appalachian Council (Tennessee)
- Appalachian Council (Virginia)
