= Girl Scouts of Central and Western Massachusetts =

- Owner: Girl Scouts of the USA
- Headquarters: Holyoke (main); Worcester (secondary)
- Country: United States
- Website www.gscwm.org

Girl Scouts of Central and Western Massachusetts serves 15,000 girls in 186 communities. It was formed by a merger in early 2008 of three councils: Girl Scouts of Montachusett Council, Girl Scouts of Pioneer Valley, Girl Scouts of Western Massachusetts.

== History ==
The history of Girl Scouts in Central & Western Massachusetts began in 1916 when local councils were formed in Massachusetts. Just one year later, there were nearly 800 girl scouts in Massachusetts, with councils from Boston to Springfield. To fulfill the mission of Juliette Low for all girls to experience a healthy lifestyle including nature study and outdoor activities, this council searched for a location appropriate for a camp. This begins the history of Camp Bonnie Brae.

The founders were Miss Edith Sinnett and Mrs Edith G. Newell. Unlike other organizations, the Girl Scouts has always been run completely by women. The set vision of the camp experience is as follows: “The girls will always be cheerful, a friend to every Girl Scout, they will enjoy camp fires and singing; they will be responsible by doing their tasks without shirking or complaining, by sharing and having fun. They also will respect nature, appreciate and utilize without harming it. They also will be courteous to old and new friends.”

In 1911, William T. and Margaret L. Dakin sold their property to the Springfield Girl Scout Council (SGS) On March 12, 1914, William Dakin donated more land. During the year of 1919, the Springfield Girl Scouts established “a committee to look into the matter of summer camp.” In the same year, they choose the camp at East Otis after “microscopical examinations.”

To get to Camp Bonnie Brae, most of the campers travelled 20 miles on a trolley from Springfield, then would ride on the camp truck the other 15 miles to East Otis. Camp Bonnie Brae was the first camp to use the 'buddy system'. In 1919 the schedule was as follows: At 6:00 am you were awakened. Exercises began at 6:15 am, followed by swimming in the lake at 6:30 am. Breakfast was served at 7:00 am.

The program included nature study, sports, and an overnight hike. No silk stockings or high-heels allowed! Uniform was a middy blouse and bloomers. The second year schedule remains as today: wake-up at 7:00 am. Swimming in the lake used to be early in the morning, but now it is saved for later in the day. The camp had six buildings: A main house, shed, farm house, barn, and wonder house. In 1920, the mortgage was paid. In January 1925, the camp bought an unknown number of acres for $716.00. Traditional activities included Native American studies, dance, first aid, butterfly study, bugling, swimming, bird study, forestry, volleyball, obstacle golf, canoeing, signalling, and life-saving. Other work included astronomy, boating, child care, nursing, house-keeping, hiking, pioneering, and public health. The stated purpose of the camp experience was to provide a cheerful friend to every girl scout, to celebrate with campfires and singing, to learn responsibility by seeing through kapers without shirking or complaining, but by sharing and having fun; to experience and appreciate nature with respect, causing no harm; to be helpful and courteous; and to have both old and new friends.

Historical Note

Camp Bonnie Brae, located in East Otis, Massachusetts, is the oldest continuously operating Girl Scout camp in the United States. Begun in 1919, the camp is administered by the Girl Scouts of Pioneer Valley [Girl Scouts of Central and Western Massachusetts] in East Longmeadow, Massachusetts. The original building was an inn, also called Bonnie Brae, and was owned by Loring P. Lane. Edith Sinnett, first director of the Springfield Girl Scouts, and her friend, Edith G. Newell, wished to see the organization establish a summer camp, and in the summer of 1919 they rented Bonnie Brae from the Lane family and gave public notice that Girl Scouts could apply to attend. The fee was five dollars per week. The program for summer included nature study, as well as tennis, basketball, baseball, and volleyball.” “A bugler and a cook were hired for the summer, and two dietitians from Boston planned the menus for the camp. The success of the 1919 camp season made certain the continuation of the project, so accordingly the Girl Scout Council bought the 227 acres of land, the building, and the furniture from Mr. Lane for $10,000. Counselors served on a volunteer basis, and came from various occupations around the Springfield area. The camp maintained a 1:7 staff to camper ratio. In 1921, several troops of the Springfield Council donated money for scholarships so that girls who lacked the fees could attend. The camp has always accommodated persons of all races, creeds, and economic backgrounds. Also in 1921, the waterfront program at Camp Bonnie Brae was reorganized by an instructor from the American Red Cross. The campers were divided into three groups according to their swimming skills, and great emphasis was placed on graduating from one group to the next. The system of water buddies as a means of keep [sic] track of swimmers was instituted at Camp Bonnie Brae, the first camp in the country to do so. To enable Bonnie Brae to accommodate older girls, and to offer a better program for younger scouts, property was purchased a half-mile from Bonnie Brae and a Brownie Camp established there in 1941. Also in 1941, the Second Western Hemisphere Encampment was held at Camp Bonnie Brae. Girls from fourteen countries and from all over the United States attended. The guest of honor was Eleanor Roosevelt, and during her visit she spoke with the girls about democracy, proper nutrition, the bases of a post-war peace, and international cooperation. The camp has expanded its facilities over the years to include more campers and offer more activities. As of 2007, the summer program accommodated 140 girls from around the country and the world. There are also non-residential programs offered in spring, fall and winter.

In 1920 the Girl Scout rankings were: Tender Foot, Second Class, First Class, Corporal and Patrol Leader. In the 1920s Camp Bonnie Brae had Bonnie Brae Echoes, a newspaper. It cost 5 cents. A feast known as the Nature's Bouquet was the closing feature of the camp season, which was a great success. In 1921, some of the tents were substituted by cabins for the younger girls. Sunday worship happened at camp, and scholarships were established. During the year of 1922, the girls were taught to make their beds. If you went in the summer of 1923, you would have been taught how to weave on a loom. There were more athletics, and a Trail's End club for older girls. In 1924 and 25, the camp got electricity, and an archery program was developed. Sherwood, Camelot and the Jungle units were established. By 1926, the girl scout council system of self-government was recognized nationally. In 1927, Camp Bonnie Brae was run by the Massachusetts Girl Scouts. There were 800 campers that season. In 1929, the Romani Patrin 'gypsy' unit was formed. As time went by, the end of program ceremonies became an important tradition in which girls created a skit, decorations, formations, poems and songs that were sung and played on instruments. Music and creativity continue to be a traditional component of girl scout camping.

During the year of 1930, the counsellor training unit began. The girls there lived in white army tents. By 1930, many of the tents were replaced by cabins for the younger campers. This year, they had fewer campers (402) but they were still open the full 8 weeks. The rankings changed over the years. In 1931 it went from Brownies to Tawny Owl to Brown Owl to Girl Scout, Lieutenant and Captain. In 1933, the camp store held emblems, cards, stamps, flashlight batteries, bathing caps, films, knives, ink, kotex, ties, notebooks, belts, toothpaste, stationery, pins, and many other useful items. In 1935, Anchorage officially became a unit. There were 389 campers that year. In 1937, Miss Sinnett begins to develop a long range plans to meet the needs of both the younger and older girls at camp. The dining hall began to fail, and new construction began in 1938. Also in 1938, the boating program was instated which continued into 1956. A totem pole was built, and the girls would sing around it. Two other Girl Scout camps formed near Bonnie Brae, one called Dyerbrook and the other was Edith Sinnett; these were day camps for younger girls.

In July 1940 the camp got electricity from the Pittsfield Electric Company, most of the structures were built and a new artesian well was dug. The fee was $5.00 per week. A new unit, Enchanted Forest, was established, with its own base a mile hike from the camp. There were 397 campers that year. In 1941 the state granted the Peck Lumber Company access to the forests; this company logged 200 acres (the lumbering continued until 1962). Eleanor Roosevelt came and toured the camp this season, telling girls to “develop a seeing eye and an inquiring mind”, and she placed the camp on the International Girl Scout Camp list. During the 2nd Western Hemisphere Encampment in the same year, scouts from across the United States and more than 14 other countries exchanged recipes, camping ideas, customs and costumes. After her visit, Mrs. Roosevelt penned a special essay for her column “My Day”.

In 1945, there were 485 campers. A year later, the camp had a horse program from John Simpson of Hartford, with six horses, a truck and some grain and hay that cost $760. In 1948, the campers went on many biking trips. A camp improvement was the installation of an infirmary, which was dedicated with a special program. Included in the Infirmary dedication August 15, 1948 is the philosophical statement that "Loyalty and honor go hand in hand. One of these without the other would fade and our inner qualities would lose their fine touch, in many ways less tangible than games, these qualities are being put to practice when Girl Scouts honor foremost one's self, and then school, camp and ideas." In 1949, a new dishwashing system was developed with advice from the Cornell School of Home Economics. By this time, In the late 1940s, the original inn burned down and was replaced by a building called Big House. The Big House held the camp store, art area and offices.

During the year of 1950, the Enchanted Forest became a unit for the oldest regular campers. Other units included Tanglewood, Jungle, Camelot, Wahpeton, and Sherwood. The campers earned special camp letters and awards by doing activities and quests. Braids were established as the official camp hair-do, and if you did not behave, your supper would be destined to be prunes! Scouts would compete to see who would get the most clams out of Big pond. Since clams were only found in the deep end of the swimming area, you had to swim under the water and grab one. Their sport field program included: track, golf, tennis, basketball, volleyball and baseball. Even then, families were told not to send in radios with their campers. In 1953, there were 506 campers.

In the summer of 1955, the camp program included sail-boating, a brand new activity. Sailboats were purchased and were in use through 1956. This camp unit was Lochmar, a sailing unit for younger Girl Scouts. There were also Anchorage and Birnam Wood. Tyro was originally the counselor training unit, until Green Horizons took its place. Other continuing units were Sherwood, Viking Dalen and Enchanted Forest. The newspaper changed to The Bonnie Brae Bugle as well. Over time the Springfield Girl Scouts Became the Pioneer Valley Girl Scouts with Chicopee, Agawam, East Longmeadow, Longmeadow, Hampton, Monson, Wilberham, Palmer, Ware, Belchertown and Ludlow troops.

In 1960, the camp was run by the Pioneer Valley Girl Scout Council, Inc. Girls went on Quests and got special badges. Here is an example of a quest: 1. Find a spider's web. 2. Catch a fly and put it in the web. 3. Watch what the spider does, then tell about it. 4. Find which part of the web is sticky and which isn't. In 1968, the units changed back to age-based levels. In that year, Camp Bonnie Brae occupied 250 acres of land and had 120 campers. The oldest training unit is the counsellor training unit.

== Camps ==
- Bonnie Brae, East Otis, Massachusetts
- Green Eyrie, Harvard, Massachusetts
- Kinnebrook, Worthington, Massachusetts
- Laurel Wood, Spencer, Massachusetts
- Lewis Perkins, South Hadley, Massachusetts
- Marion White, Richmond, Massachusetts
- Neyati, Leicester, Massachusetts
