= French Creek Council =

Boy Scout council in Ohio and Pennsylvania, United States

French Creek Council (#532)
- Owner: Scouting America
- Headquarters: Erie, Pennsylvania
- Country: United States
- Founded: 1972
- Website www.fccscouting.org

The French Creek Council serves Boy Scouts in six counties in northwestern Pennsylvania and one township in Ohio. The council was organized in 1972 from a merger of the former Washington Trail Council of Erie, Custaloga Council of Sharon and Colonel Drake Council of Oil City, Pennsylvania. It has headquarters in Erie, Pennsylvania.

== Organization ==
- Chief Kiondashawa District serves Crawford and Mercer Counties (west of I-79; including Meadville, PA) and Brookfield Township, Ohio.
- Colonel Drake District serves Crawford and Mercer Counties (east of I-79), Venango County, Clarion County and Forest County.
- Oliver Perry District serves Erie County, Pennsylvania.

== Camps ==
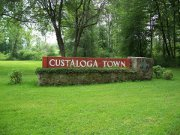
Sign at the front entrance of CTSR (Custaloga Town Scout Reservation )

The French Creek Council owns and operates a 525-acre (2.12 km^{2}) facility known as Custaloga Town Scout Reservation, located along French Creek in Mercer and Venango counties.

=== Native American history ===
Chief Custaloga of the Wolf Clan of Lenape arrived at the present site of Custaloga Town Scout Reservation in the mid 18th century and built a sizeable village here, which became his principal seat. Custaloga's name first appeared in western Pennsylvania's history in "George Washington's Journal of 1753". When Washington arrived at Fort Machault in the village of Venango (present Franklin, PA), Custaloga was in charge of the wampum of his nation.

Since Custaloga had aided Chief Pontiac in his rebellion, the Iroquois Confederacy sent the Seneca sachem Garistagee to live at Custaloga's Town, to maintain a watchful eye on Custaloga. The Seneca warrior Guyasuta is believed to have died at, and was buried at Custaloga's Town.

Late in life, Custaloga may have moved to Custalogas Town, Ohio, then perhaps returned to Kuskusky. In February 1778, Custaloga's sister (the mother of Captain Pipe) was killed at Kuskusky during the Squaw Campaign of General Edward Hand. On November 29 1778, Colonel James Smith led 400 troops on the French Creek Expedition from Fort Pitt to Custaloga's Town, but found it evacuated. After this date very little is recorded about Custaloga. Captain Pipe was Custaloga's successor as leader of the Wolf Clan of the Lenape.

=== European settlers ===
The first log cabin on site was built in 1794 and the Heydrick Homestead was started by Dr. Charles Heydrick in 1820. This over 200-year-old building is still in use by the French Creek Council. The Heydrick farm continued to be operated through 1946.

=== Camp history ===
In 1963, the Mercer County Council purchased the land for the development of a camp to replace Camp Kiondashawa. Jim Dunlop was president for four years during the fund drive and construction of the reservation. Carlton Hutchison was chairman of the camp fund drive. John Gross, the person who found this site, was the architect of buildings and camp layout. Vern Smith was camp development chairman for Mercer County Council.

Custaloga Town Scout Reservation opened to Scout camping in the summer of 1967. A year later, in 1968 the first Scout summer camp season was held, with Dr. Frederick J. Brenner serving as Camp Director. Custaloga Town Scout Reservation was officially dedicated on Saturday, July 19, 1969. In the summer of 2018, Custaloga Town celebrated its 50th anniversary with a camp-wide celebration. Concurrent with this was the official ribbon cutting ceremony for a newly remodeled bridge that crosses Deer Creek.

A Scout reservation refers to a camping facility that include more than one camp. As such, Custaloga Town includes Camp Hank Forker—which is and has always been the only camp. It is for this reason that the name Hank Forker is almost always ignored on promotional materials, patches, and programs. Plans for a second camp on the reservation have been in the making for many years. However, camp is always referred to as Custaloga Town.

Mercer County Council, which had been renamed the Custaloga Council, would later merge with Washington Trail and Colonel Drake councils to form the French Creek Council. After the closings of the other two former council camps, Sequoyah- on the shores of Lake Erie, and Coffman- now a YMCA camp in Venango and Clarion counties, Custaloga Town became the primary camping facility for the French Creek Council.

Each year Custaloga Town Scout Reservation hosts hundreds of Scouts from all over the United States, but mostly the Northeastern United States.

== Langundowi Lodge ==
Langundowi Lodge
- Founded: 1972
- Website http://frenchcreek-bsa.org/lodge.php

The Order of the Arrow Lodge for the French Creek Council is Langundowi Lodge #46. This Lodge came into existence in 1972 with the merger of the former Eriez Lodge #46 (Erie, PA), Hoh-Squa-Sa-Gah-Da Lodge #251 (Sharon, PA) and the Skanondo Inyan Lodge #256 (Oil City, PA). The name "Langundowi" means "Peaceful One" in Lenape. The Lodge totem is the Iroquois Great Tree of Peace. Langundowi Lodge has been a strong and integral part of the French Creek Council since the merger and continues to be a leader in the local, sectional and national levels.

== See also ==
- Scouting in Pennsylvania
