= Scouting in West Virginia =

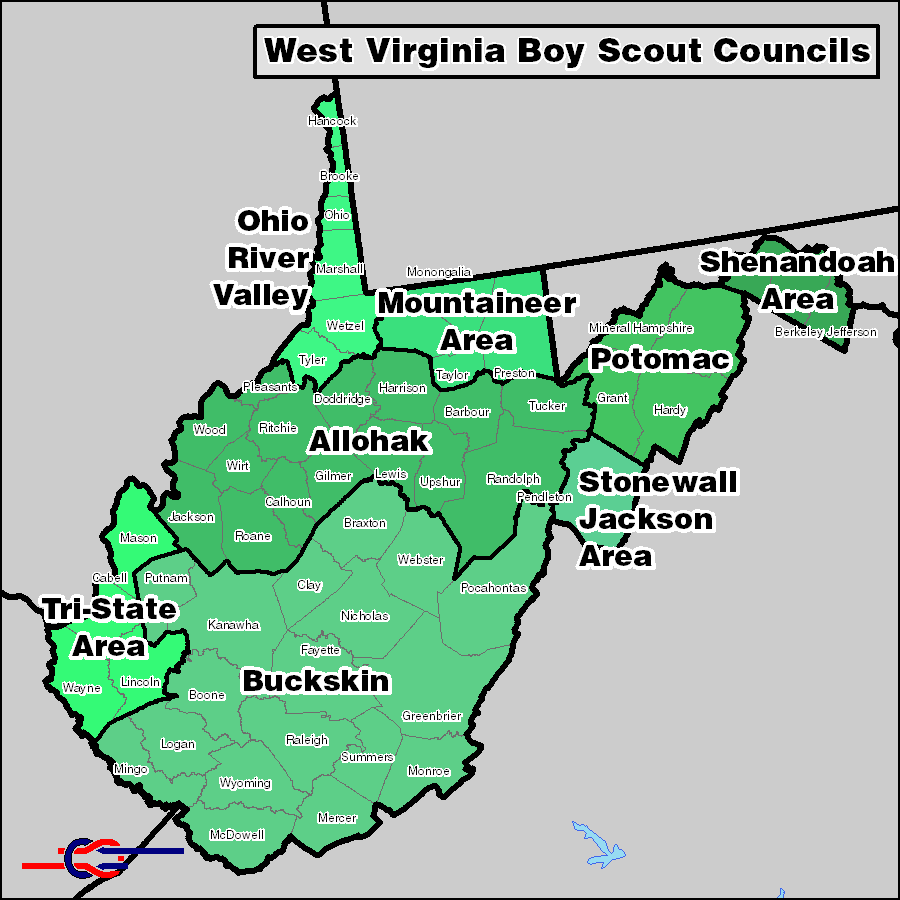
- BSA Councils Serving West Virginia

Scouting in West Virginia has a long history, from the 1910s to the present day, serving thousands of youth in programs that suit the environment in which they live.

== Early history (1909-1950) ==
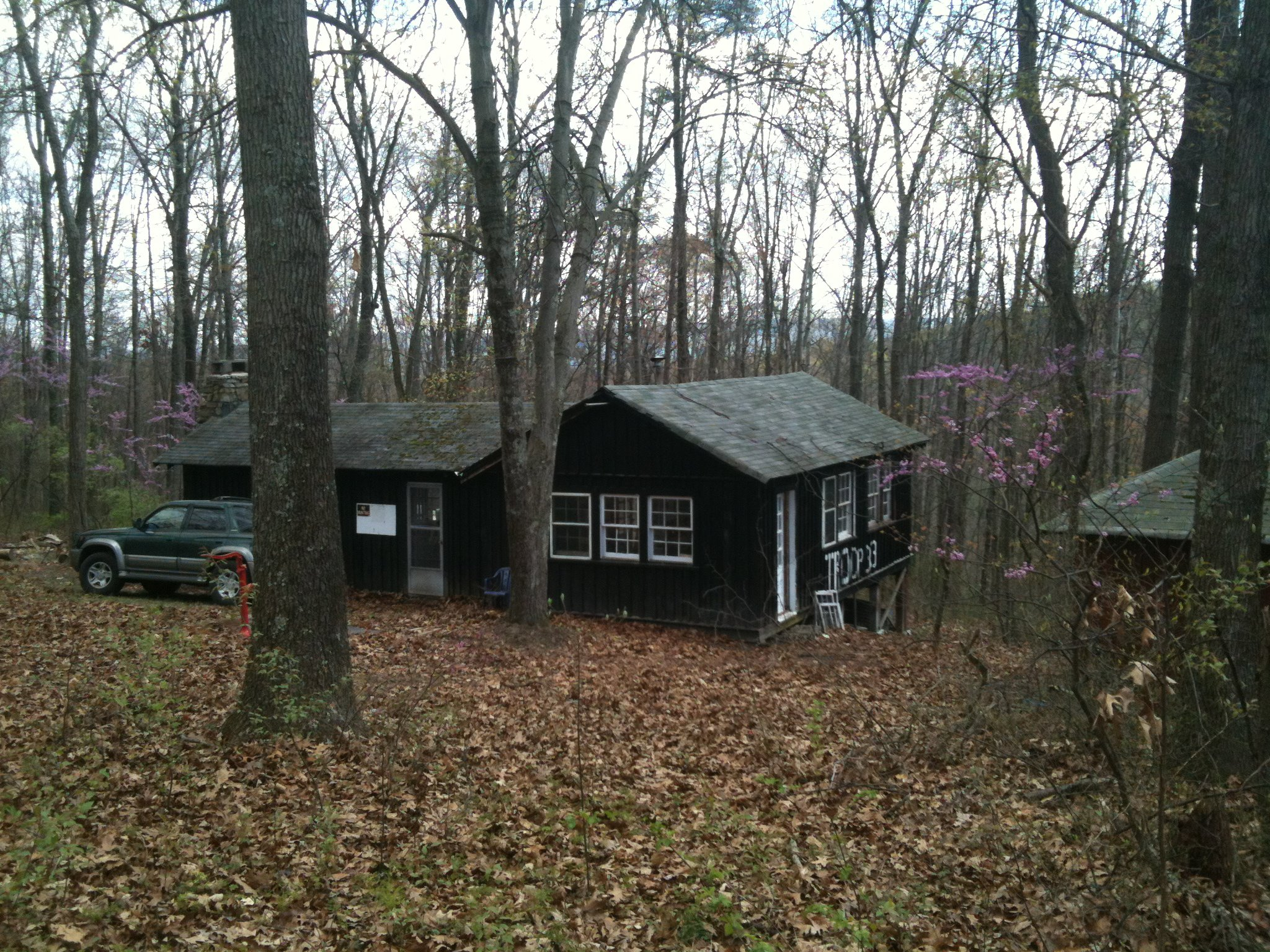
Camp Waldo Schmitt

In 1920, the Fairmont Council was founded. It closed in 1922.

In 1921, the Morgantown Council was founded. It closed in 1923.

In 1922, the Grafton Council was founded. It closed in 1923.

In 1923, the New River District Council (#615) was founded. It closed in 1923.

In 1928, the Mountaineer Area Council was founded.

In 1925, the McDowell County Council (#707) was founded. It changed its name to the Southern West Virginia Council (#707) in 1928.

In 1925, the Charleston Council (#617) was founded. It changed its name to the Charleston Area Council (#617) in 1929.

In 1926, the Logan County Council (#756) was founded. It changed its name to the Logan-Boone Area Council (#756) in 1930. It merged into the Logan-Boone-Mingo Area Council (#756) in 1935.

In 1930, the Kentucky-West Virginia Council (#626) was founded. It merged into the Logan-Boone-Mingo Area Council (#756) in 1934. It changed its name to the Cornstalk Council (#756) in 1953. It changed its name to the Chief Cornstalk Council (#756) in 1954. It merged into the Buckskin Council (#617) in 1990.

In 1929, the Charleston Area Council (#617) was founded. It changed its name to the Buckskin Council (#617) in 1949.

In 1946, the Appalachian Council (#673) was founded. It merged into the Southern West Virginia Council (#707) in 1955. It changed its name to the Appalachian Council (#707) in 1956. In 1991, the council merged into the Buckskin Council (#617).

In 1949, the Buckskin Council (#617) was founded.

In 1919, the Parkersburg Council (#618) was founded. It changed its name to the Kootaga Area Council (#618) in 1933. In 1990, it merged into the Allohak Council (#618).

In 1916, the Clarksburg Council (#616) was founded. It changed its name to the Clarksburg Area Council (#616) in 1936. It changed its name to the Central West Virginia Council (#616) in 1941. In 1990, it merged into the Allohak Council (#618).

In 1916, the Wheeling Council (#619) was founded. It changed its name to the Wheeling and Moundsville Council (#619) in 1923. It changed its name to the Wheeling Area Council (#619) in 1925. It changed its name to the Huroquois Council (#619) in 1926. It changed its name to the National Trail Council (#619) in 1966. It changed its name to the Ohio River Valley Council (#619) in 1991.

In 1919, the Huntington Council (#672) was founded. It changed its name to the Huntington Area Council (#672) in 1924. It changed its name to the Tri-State Area Council (#672) in 1935.

== Recent history (1950-present) ==
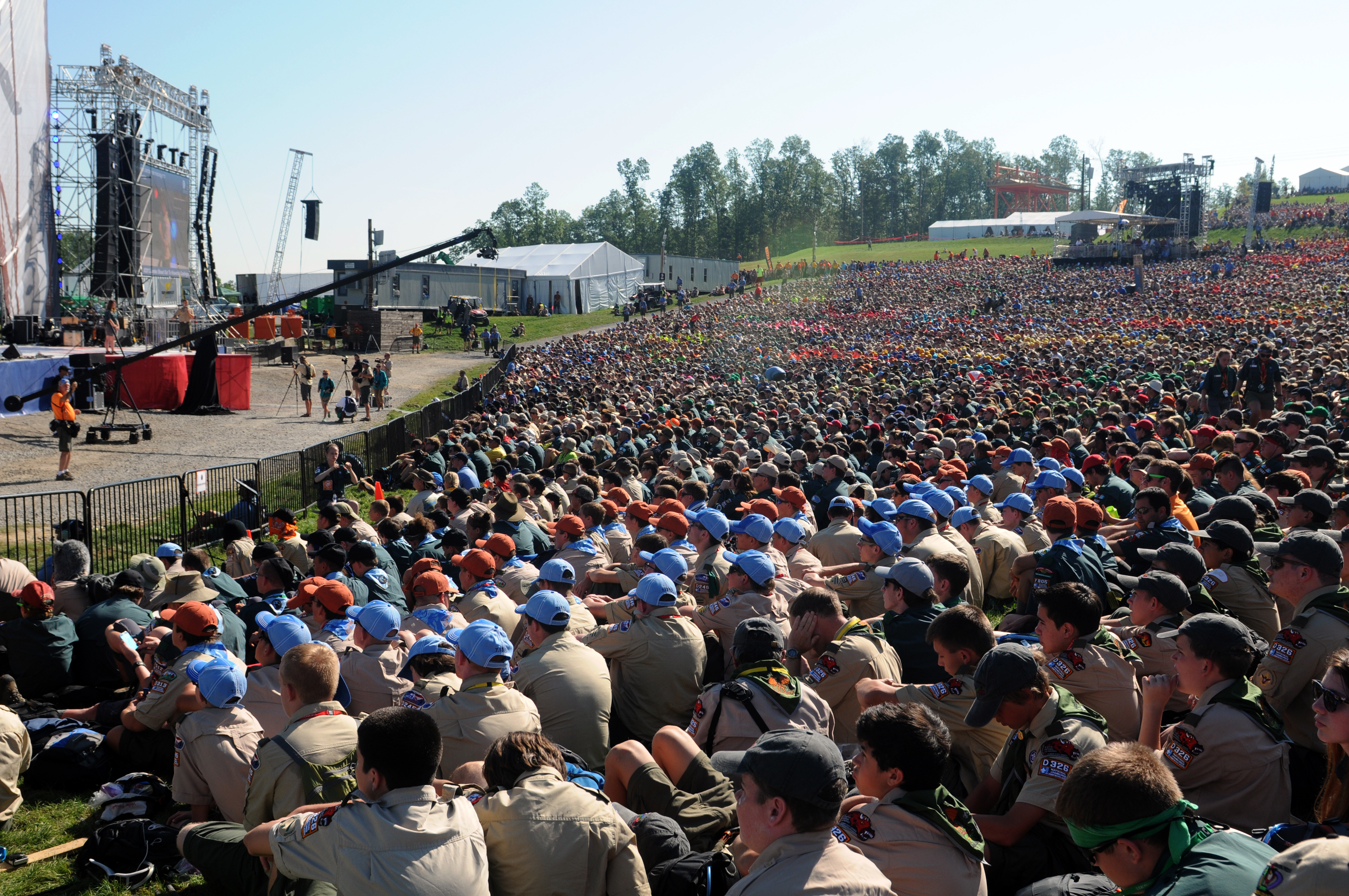
Opening Ceremony of the 2013 National Scout Jamboree at the Summit Bechtel Reserve.

In 1990, the Allohak Council (#618) was created from the merger of the Central West Virginia Council (#616) and the Kootaga Area Council (#618).

The Summit Bechtel Family National Scout Reserve, often shortened as Summit Bechtel Reserve (SBR) and The Summit, located in Mount Hope, West Virginia, near Beckley, is one of four facilities managed by the National Council of the Boy Scouts of America (BSA). The Summit is the home of the national Scout jamboree, The Paul R. Christen National High Adventure Base, The James C. Justice National Scout Camp, and the Thomas S. Monson Leadership Excellence Complex. The main site is 10,600 acres (43 km^{2}) in size, with additional properties along the New River Gorge totaling around 14,000 acres. The facility hosted the 2013 National Scout Jamboree.

== Boy Scouts of America in West Virginia today ==
There are nine Boy Scouts of America local (BSA) councils in West Virginia. Most of West Virginia lies within the BSA's Central Region, Mineral, Hardy, Hampshire, are part of the Northeast Region. Pendleton, Morgan, Berkeley and Jefferson counties, are part of the Southern Region.

=== Allohak Council ===
Allohak Council
- Owner: Boy Scouts of America
- Headquarters: Parkersburg, West Virginia
- Location: West Virginia and Ohio
- Founded: 1990
- Website allohak.org

The Allohak Council was created in 1990 but was disbanded on December 31, 2018.

It was composed of six districts and served West Virginia and Ohio. The council headquarters was in Parkersburg, West Virginia.

==== History ====
Parkersburg Council #618 founded 1919
Kootaga Area Council #618 renamed 1933
Kootaga Area Council #618 merged 1942
Allohak Council #618 merged 1990

Marietta Council #464 founded 1917
Washington County Council #464 renamed 1922
Southeastern Ohio Council #464 renamed 1923

Clarksburg Council #616 founded 1916
Clarksburg Area Council #616 renamed 1936
Central West Virginia Council #616 renamed 1941

==== Split of Council ====
Buckskin Council

- Blennerhassett District - Counties of Ritchie, Wood (except Williamstown), and Belpre, Ohio became part of the newly formed Kootaga District of the Buckskin Council
- Little Kanawha District - Counties of Calhoun, Jackson, Roane, and Wirt became part of the newly formed Kootaga District in the Buckskin Council

Mountaineer Council

- Highland District - Counties of Barbour, Upshur, Randolph, Tucker moved into the Mountaineer Council
- Stonewall Jackson District - Counties of Doddridge, Gilmer, Harrison, and Lewis moved into the Mountaineer Council.

Simon Kenton Council

- Hock Hocking District - Athens County, Ohio moved into the Simon Kenton Council

Muskingum Valley Council

- Washington District - Counties of Pleasants, Washington County, Ohio (except Belpre), and Williamstown moved into the Muskingum Valley Council.

==== Camps ====
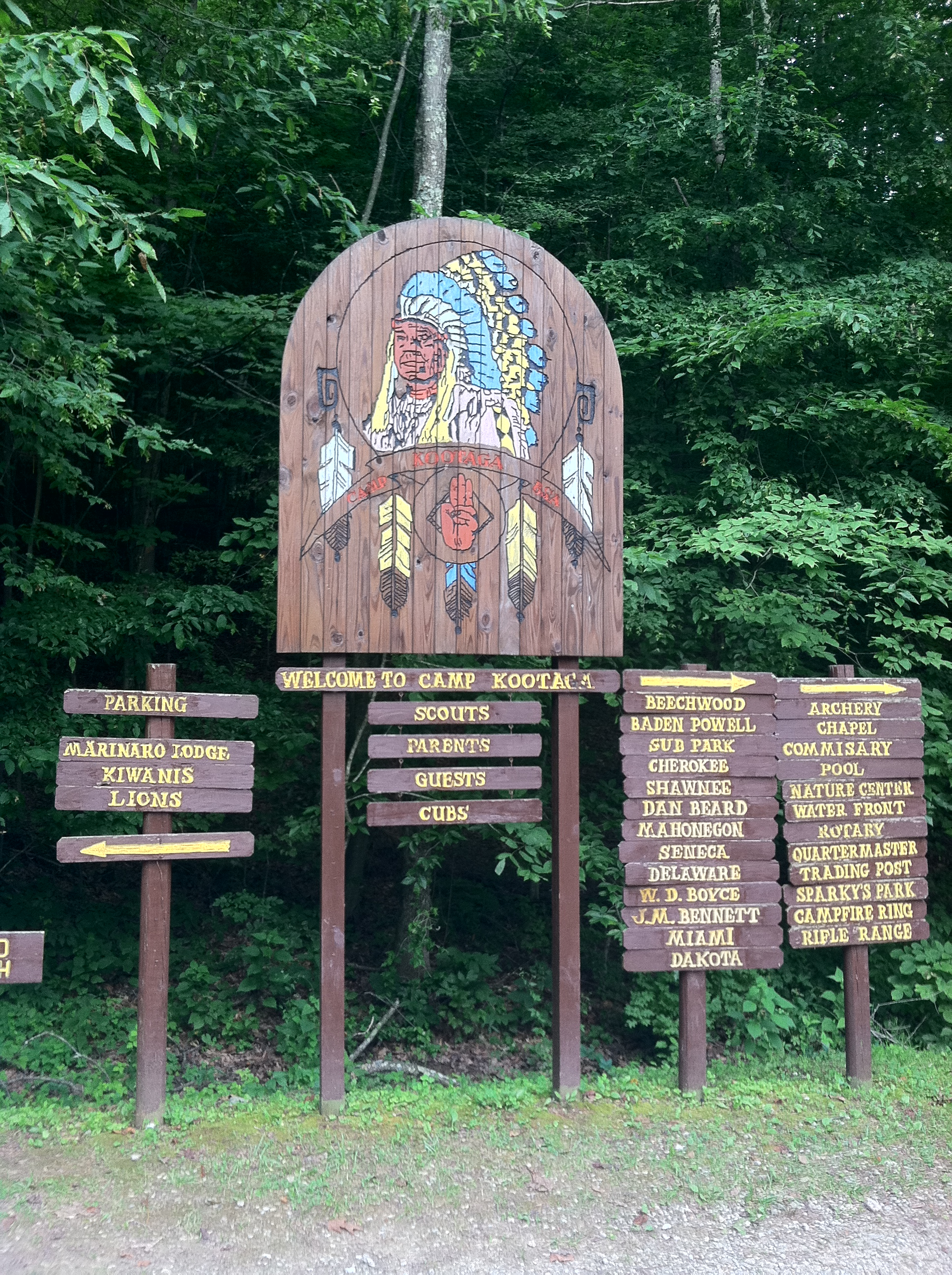
Camp Kootaga entrance sign.

Camp Kootaga is located in Wirt County, WV. It serves as the summer camp for the Allohak Council. The camp is located on approximately 600 acres of forest land along the Hughes River. Each year 5 weeks of summer camp are conducted at Camp Kootaga. Camp Kootaga has 14 campsites.

The property known as Camp Kootaga was purchased in 1922 by Don B. Lowe under the Gim-O-Gash tribe of the Boy Scouts of America. The first long-term summer camp was held that year on the banks of the Hughes River in the Kootaga region. This camp consisted of one or two Troops from the Parkersburg area with Don B. Lowe as the Camp Director during the early years. In 1929 Col. R. L. Cole brought a Kiowa Indian named J. Dougannah to help with the camp program. He gave Indian names to the Leaders and named the Boy Scout camp "Kootaga" which means "Good Friends." Through the years, Camp Kootaga has gone through many changes, but one thing has remained constant: helping develop young men into upstanding citizens and outstanding individuals.

Camp Mahonegon, sitting of approximately 500 acres in Upshur County, is the second camp in the Allohak Council. Though no longer used as an active summer camp, Mahonegon has remained an active part of the council. It is used for many council events yearly, and continues to be a focal point for scouting activity. The First Summer Camp was held in 1948. The last Summer Camp was held in 1980. Camp Mahonegon was put up for sale when the Allohak Council was dissolved.

=== Buckeye Council ===
Buckeye Council serves Scouts in Ohio and West Virginia.

=== Buckskin Council ===
Buckskin Council
- Owner: Boy Scouts of America
- Headquarters: Charleston, West Virginia
- Location: Kentucky, Ohio, Virginia, West Virginia
- Website http://www.buckskin.org

Buckskin Council serves Scouts in Scouts in Kentucky, Ohio, Virginia and West Virginia.

==== Organization ====
The council is divided into several districts:

- Adena District
- Chief Cornstalk District
- Kootaga District
- Mountain Dominion District
- Seneca District
- Shawnee District

=== Mountaineer Area Council ===
Mountaineer Area Council
- Owner: Boy Scouts of America
- Headquarters: Fairmont, West Virginia
- Location: West Virginia
- Founded: 1928
- Website macbsa.org

The Mountaineer Area Council serves Scouts of Monongalia, Marion, Preston, Taylor, Barbour, Tucker, Randolph, Upshur, Harrison, Doddridge, Gilmer, and Lewis counties in North Central West Virginia. It is the only council in the state to exclusively serve counties of West Virginia.

==== History ====
The Mountaineer Area Council (#615) was founded 1928.

January 1, 2019 included the acquisition of eight counties to the council's territory, to include twelve counties total. The former Stonewall Jackson and Highland Districts of the Allohak Council joined the Mountaineer Area Council after the dissolution of the Allohak Council.

==== Organization ====
- Heart of West Virginia District serving Harrison, Marion, Doddridge, Gilmer, Lewis, and Taylor Counties
- Cheat District serving Monongalia, Preston, Tucker, Barbour, Upshur, and Randolph Counties

==== Camps ====
- Camp Mountaineer is located in Morgantown, WV. It is the summer camp for the Mountaineer Area Council. Opening in 1956, Camp Mountaineer is a premiere year-round camping facility encompassing over 1,000 acres of West Virginia foliage and fauna. Hidden in the hills of Monongalia County, this serene camp has a variety of campsites and program areas near picturesque Strawn Lake. The Summer Camps include Scouts BSA Resident Camp, Cub Scout Resident Camp, Cub Scout Day Camp, and High Adventure Camp for Scouts 13 and up. From the youngest Scouts, there is the Mountain Man program, advanced leadership building skills of the C.O.P.E. and High Adventure Programs. The state of the art Shooting Sports facilities with specialized rifle, shotgun and archery ranges, and two climbing & rappelling towers.
- Camp Lynn is located at 39°30'22.8"N 79°52'21.0"W. It is 168 acres of rustic camping just 2.6 miles from Camp Mountaineer on Boy Scout Rd. Camp Lynn is remote with limited access by vehicle. With many natural streams, a large field, and hard wood and pine forests surrounding it, it is the perfect location for backpacking, trail excursions or primitive camping.

==== Order of the Arrow ====
Menawngihella Lodge #550

=== Ohio River Valley Council ===
Ohio River Valley Council
- Owner: Boy Scouts of America
- Headquarters: Wheeling, West Virginia
- Location: West Virginia and Ohio
- Founded: 1991
- Website orvc-bsa.org

Ohio River Valley Council serves Scouts in West Virginia and Ohio.

==== History ====
Wheeling Council #619 founded 1916
Wheeling and Moundsville Council #619 renamed 1923
Wheeling Area Council #619 renamed 1925
Huroquois Council #619 renamed 1926
Fort Steuben Area Council #459 founded 1929
National Trail Council #619 renamed 1966
Ohio River Valley Council #619 merged 1991

==== Districts ====
- Two Chiefs serves Harrison County, OH, Jefferson County, OH, Brooke County, WV Hancock County, WV
- National Trail serves Belmont County, OH, Ohio County, WV
- Mountaineer serves Monroe County, OH, Marshall County, WV, Wetzel County, WV, Tyler County, WV

==== Camps ====
- Fort Steuben Scout Reservation - Freeport, Ohio
- Sandscrest Scout Reservation - Wheeling, WV

==== Order of the Arrow ====
Onondaga Lodge 36

=== Laurel Highlands Council ===
Laurel Highlands Council served Scouts in Maryland, Pennsylvania, and West Virginia.

=== Shenandoah Area Council ===
Shenandoah Area Council serves Scouts in Virginia and West Virginia.

=== Virginia Headwaters Council ===
Virginia Headwaters Council (#763)
- Owner: Scouting America
- Headquarters: Waynesboro, Virginia
- Location: Virginia and West Virginia
- Founded: 1927
- Website https://www.virginiaheadwaters.org/

The Virginia Headwaters Council, known prior to 2019 at the Stonewall Jackson Area Council, serves Scouts in the Shenandoah Valley and Charlottesville areas of Virginia and Pendleton County, West Virginia.

==== Organization ====
The council is part of Area 7 of the Southern Region of the BSA. The council service center is in Waynesboro, Virginia and employs seven paid professional Scouters and an office staff. SJAC is divided into four districts:

- Massanutten District: Harrisonburg; Rockingham and Pendleton counties
- Monticello District: Charlottesville; Albemarle, Fluvanna, Greene, Louisa, Madison and Orange counties
- Southern District: Buena Vista, Covington, Clifton Forge, Lexington; Alleghany, Bath and Rockbridge counties
- Valley District: Staunton, Waynesboro; Augusta and Highland counties

== Girl Scouting in West Virginia ==
Girl Scouting in West Virginia
- Map of Girl Scout Councils in West Virginia

There are two Girl Scout councils in West Virginia.

=== Girl Scout Council of the Nation's Capital ===
In October 2009 the old Shawnee Council of West Virginia joined with the Girl Scout Council of the Nation's Capital as part of the nationwide reorganization.

West Virginia Service Center: Martinsburg, West Virginia

=== Girl Scouts of Black Diamond Council ===
Girl Scouts of Black Diamond Council
- Headquarters: Charleston, West Virginia
- Country: United States
- Website bdgsc.org

Girl Scouts of Black Diamond Council serves more than 20,000 girls in 61 counties in West Virginia, Ohio, Virginia, and Maryland.

==== Field Offices ====
- Athens, Ohio - Appalachian Field Office shared with Girl Scouts - Seal of Ohio
- Steubenville, Ohio
- Beckley, WV
- Bluefield, WV
- Chapmanville, WV
- Huntington, WV
- Fairmont, WV
- Lewisburg, WV
- Morgantown, WV
- Parkersburg, WV
- Walton, WV
- Weston, WV
- Wheeling, WV

==== Camps ====
- Camp Giscowheco in Triadelphia, West Virginia
- Camp Sandy Bend in Elizabeth, West Virginia
- Camp Mamie Flynn in Logan, West Virginia
- Camp Rocky Ledges in Milton, West Virginia

== See also ==
- Girl Scouts of Kentucky's Wilderness Road Council
