= Valley Forge, Missouri =

Extinct town in the US state of Missouri

Coordinates: 37.785329°N 90.373455°W

Valley Forge is an extinct town in St. Francois County, in the U.S. state of Missouri.

== History ==
A variant spelling was "Valle Forge." Valley Forge had its start in 1854 when one Mr. Valle built a blast furnace at the town site. A post office called Valley Forge was established in 1867, and remained in operation until 1900.
