= Scouting in Pennsylvania =

Coordinates: 39.959°N 75.17552°W

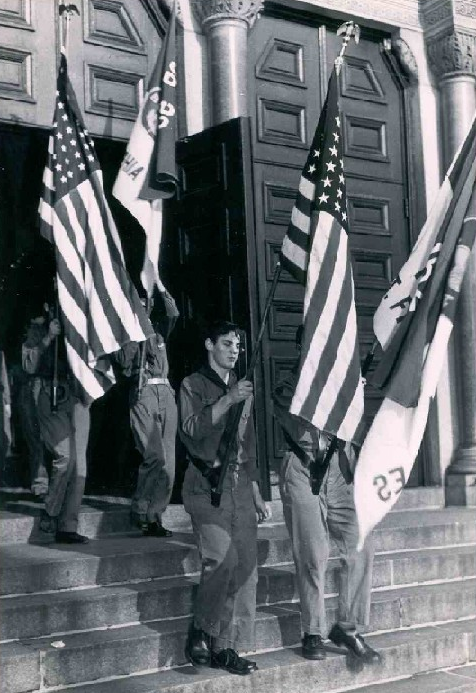
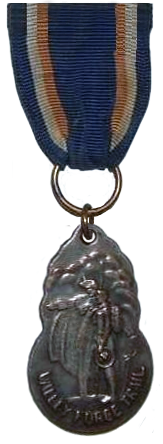
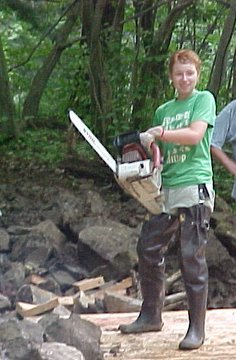
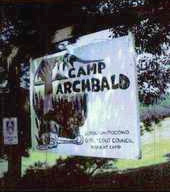
- Troop 152 Scouts, Philadelphia, at Scout Sunday Service at the St Francis de Sales church Valley Forge Trail Medal Girl Scout working on her Gold Award Project Camp Archbald Sign

Scouting in Pennsylvania has a tradition, starting from 1908 to the present day, serving thousands of youth in programs that suit the environment in which they live.

== History ==
=== Early history (1908–1950) ===
One of the earliest Scouting groups in Pennsylvania began in 1908 in Pottsville, when a Superintendent with the Pennsylvania State Police, Lynn G. Adams, formed a troop using Baden-Powell's handbook, Scouting for Boys. The troop was made up of two patrols, one sponsored by the Pottsville Mission and the other by the YMCA. Adams became the first Scoutmaster in Pennsylvania in 1910 soon after the BSA was incorporated. The oldest Pennsylvania Scout troop still in existence is "Troop Bala One" in Bala Cynwyd, which was founded in 1908 by Frank H. Sykes.

The first council in Pennsylvania was the Delaware & Montgomery County Council in 1911. This council eventually became the former Valley Forge Council, now part of the Cradle of Liberty Council.

Warren, Pennsylvania, Boy Scout basketball team, 1912

Sixteen councils were chartered in America between 1910 and 1913. The seventeenth was the Warren County Council headquartered in Warren, Pennsylvania. This council later changed its name to Chief Cornplanter Council and is still in operation. It is currently the oldest existing, continuously registered council in America. The other preceding 16 councils either went out of business or merged with another council at some point in their history. The information for this paragraph was provided by the Registration Department of the National Office of the BSA, Irving, Texas, in October 2007.

Also in 1913, the Philadelphia Council opened the first American scout camp, Treasure Island Scout Reservation, near Point Pleasant. Two years later, Dr. E. Urner Goodman and Carrol Edson founded the Order of the Arrow, which inducted its first members on July 16, 1915 at Treasure Island.

In 1914, the Allegheny County Council, forerunner of today's Laurel Highlands Council, was chartered. Also in 1914, the Philadelphia Council was chartered.

In 1915 charters were first granted to the councils headquartered in Erie, Wilkes-Barre, and Oil City.

In 1916, councils were chartered in Reading, Lancaster, Harrisburg, and Scranton, among others. The council in Harrisburg is now part of New Birth of Freedom Council.

In 1917 Meadville, State College and Bethlehem were granted charters by the National Office, along with nine other councils.

1919 saw the councils in Williamsport, Altoona and Chester County formed. Like Chief Cornplanter, the Chester County Council is still in operation, one of only a handful of small one-county councils left in America. The other one in Pennsylvania, Bucks County Council, received its first charter in 1927.

By 1920, forty-six councils had been chartered in Pennsylvania. Most of these were small councils no larger than the town they were named after. Some of these were known as "Second Class Councils". In the following years, other currently chartered councils were started: Juniata Valley in 1929; Bucktail in 1930; Columbia-Montour and Schuylkill County Area in 1931; and York-Adams in 1932.

1937 saw the formation of the current Westmoreland-Fayette Council in Greensburg.

All other current councils in Pennsylvania are the result of mergers which began to occur in the 1960s through the present day.

1941 saw the creation of Camp Ockanickon in Bucks County Council.

Among the claimants for First Boy Scout Troop in the United States is Troop 1 in Bala Cynwyd.

Pennsylvania is home to the oldest annual Scouting event in the nation, the Valley Forge Pilgrimage and Encampment.

In 1928, Eagle Scout (and Erie native) Paul Siple was one of the first Scouts to travel to Antarctica with Admiral Richard Byrd. Byrd had held a national contest to invite worthy Eagle Scouts onto the expedition. Paul Siple later went on to develop what is now known as the "Wind Chill Factor"

The 1921 and 1931 National Order of the Arrow Lodge Meetings were held at Philadelphia, the 1922 and 1927 National Lodge Meetings were held at Reading, and the 1940 National Lodge Meeting was held at Ligonier.

In 1924, the McKean County Council (#499) was formed, changing its name to the McKean-Potter Area Council (#499) in 1926. In 1936, the council changed its name to the McKean-Potter Area Council (#499) in 1936. In 1947, the council changed its name to the Elk Lick Council (#499).^{[a]}

=== Recent history (1950–1990) ===
The 1950 National Scout Jamboree was held at Valley Forge. That experience led to National Jamborees in 1957 and 1964 as well.

Outside of the few small councils mentioned above, the history of Pennsylvania councils over the past 50 years has been one of mergers.^{[a]}

Beginning in 1962, the Mid-Valley Council, headquartered in Peckville, merged with the former Dan Beard Council in Scranton to form the Forest Lakes Council. Meanwhile, in 1970, the former Anthracite Council (Hazleton) merged with the former Wyoming Valley Council (Wilkes-Barre) to form the Penn Mountains Council. In 1984, the area comprising the former Anthracite Council removed itself from the Penn Mountains Council and joined neighboring Minsi Trails Council. Forest Lakes Council and Penn Mountains Council merged in 1990 to form the current Northeastern Pennsylvania Council, in Moosic.

In 1967, the former Nemacolin Trails Council in Washington, Pennsylvania, merged with the Allegheny Council in Pittsburgh to become the Allegheny Trails Council. This council merged again in 1993 with East Valley Council to become the Greater Pittsburgh Council.

In 1969, the Lehigh County Council (Allentown), Bethlehem Area Council and Delaware Valley Area Council (Easton) merged to form the current Minsi Trails Council in Allentown.

In 1970, the former Appalachian Trail Council and Daniel Boone Council merged to form the current Hawk Mountain Council in Reading. 1970 also saw the merger of the Blair-Bedford Area Council (Altoona), William Penn Council (Indiana) and Admiral Robert E. Peary Council (Johnstown) into the Penns Woods Council in Ebensburg.

In 1971, the Lancaster County and Lebanon County councils merged to form the Lancaster-Lebanon Council. This council changed its name in 1995 to the Pennsylvania Dutch Council and is headquartered in Lancaster.

In 1972, the Washington Trail Council (Erie), Colonel Drake Council (Oil City) and Custaloga Council (Sharon) merged to form the current French Creek Council, headquartered in Erie.

1973 saw the merger of the former Lawrence County Council (New Castle) with the former Pioneer Trails Council (Butler), forming the current Moraine Trails Council, host to two National Jamborees (see below).

Also in 1973, the former Elk Lick Council, in Bradford, merged into the Allegheny Highlands Council headquartered in Falconer, New York.

In 1974, the former West Branch Council (Williamsport) and Susquehanna Valley Area Council (Sunbury) merged to form the current Susquehanna Council in Williamsport.

In 1973, the Allegheny Highlands Council (#382) was formed from a merger of the Seneca Council (#750) and the Elk Lick Council (#499).^{[a]}

Other notable happenings in Pennsylvania Scouting at this time include:

The 1950, 1957, and 1964 National Scout Jamborees were held at Valley Forge.

Half of the 1973 National Scout Jamboree ("Jamboree East") was held at Moraine State Park in Butler County, where the 1977 National Scout Jamboree and Campaganza 2010 were also held.

During 1975 and 1976, Scouts in the Philadelphia area could earn a "Colonial Philadelphia" merit badge. It could only be counted towards palms, not any rank, and came in a green border and a very yellow-green border. This was the only time BSA National approved a regional merit badge for any such use.

== Scouting America in Pennsylvania Today ==
=== Bucktail Council ===
The Bucktail Council of the Scouting America serves Cameron, Clearfield, Elk, Jefferson, and the western portions of Centre County. The Council was organized on July 24, 1930, and is headquartered in DuBois. It adopted its constitution and by-laws on April 28, 1931, thanks to the efforts of John Q. Groves of Dubois. The Council unified several independent Boy Scout troops from the surrounding areas, including Brockway, Brookville, Clearfield, DuBois, Johnsonburg, Mahaffey, Philipsburg, Reynoldsville, Ridgway, and St. Marys, under a single leadership.

The Council's name references the 13th Pennsylvania Reserve Regiment, also known as “Bucktails,” a volunteer infantry regiment that served in the Army of the Potomac during the American Civil War. When the regiment was first forming, one recruit —many of whom were woodsmen and lumbermen— decorated his hat with the tail of a white-tailed deer he had found in a butcher shop. Other men adopted the decoration, and the regiment came to be known as the “Bucktails.”

On July 23, 2025, the leadership of Bucktail Council held a public meeting titled “The Future of Bucktail Council” at Camp Mountain Run, to address the Council’s financial status and long-term viability, including the future of Camp Mountain Run. During the meeting, Council leadership cited declining participation, outstanding debts, recent staff turnover, and a conditionally approved charter from the Scouting America National Council. As a result, Council leadership announced the serious consideration of a merger with the Laurel Highlands Council, based in Pittsburgh, as well as the sale of the nearly 100-year-old Camp Mountain Run. However, no final decision has been made.

Bucktail Council #509
- Owner: Boy Scouts of America
- Headquarters: DuBois
- Location: Pennsylvania, United States
- Founded: 1931
- Scout Executive: Vacant
- President: Ryan P. Sayers, Esq.
- Commissioner: Jim Davis
- Camping Committee Chair: Scott Creighton
- OA Lodge Advisor: Andrew Klark
- Website bucktail.org

==== District ====
The Bucktail Council has a single district: PA Eastern Wilds. The district covers the following school districts: Cameron County, St. Mary’s, Bald Eagle, Clearfield, Curwensville, Moshannon Valley, West Branch, Philipsburg-Osceola, Johnsonburg, Ridgway, Brockway, DuBois, Brookville, Clarion-Limestone, and Punxsutawney.

==== Camps ====
- Camp Mountain Run

In 1931, the Council used Camp Coffman, then part of the Oil City Scout Council (now part of French Creek Council), for its first summer camp program. On May 1, 1932, the Bucktail Council Camp Committee reported that it had inspected two potential sites for a permanent Council camp: one near East Branch Clarion River in Elk County, and another near a beaver dam along Mountain Run Stream in Penfield, Clearfield County. The Council approved the leasing of the Mountain Run site, which would be developed into the 380+ acre Camp Mountain Run Scout Camp.

The land was initially leased from the Kersey Mining Company and the Commonwealth of Pennsylvania. In 1939, the Shawmut Mining Company, which had acquired Kersey's portion, sold its tract to the Council for one dollar. In 1962, through the efforts of J. Hall Stackpole (Seventh President, 1957–1960), his company, the Stackpole Carbon Company, arranged a land trade of 614 acres for the 307 acres still owned by the Commonwealth, which he then deeded to the Council.

The Stackpole Carbon Company’s generosity continued with the construction and funding of the original swimming pool in 1935, and additional funding in 1960 for the renovation of the pool's filtration system. In 1970, the Stackpole-Hall Foundation provided a substantial donation for the expansion and renovation of the Camp’s dining hall.

==== Order of the Arrow ====
- Ah'Tic Lodge #139

In the spring of 1937, leaders of Bucktail Council sought to recognize those Scouts and Scouters who were “Honor Campers,” those who best exemplified the ideals of the Scout Oath and Law, creating a Camp Honor Society for this purpose. In January 1938, the Council’s Executive Board voted to apply for a charter from the Order of the Arrow (OA).

This initiative, led by John H. Keller (Second Council Executive, 1937–1942), established the lodge’s charter membership from members of the original Honor Camper Society. On June 1, 1938, a ceremonial team from Camp Twin Echo visited Camp Mountain Run to induct the first members into the Council's OA Lodge.

The first official meeting of the Council's OA Lodge was held July 27, 1938. The name “Ah’Tic,” meaning “Standing Elk,” in the Chippewa language, was chosen in reference to the large elk population in the nearby area.

=== Chester County Council ===
Chester County Council (#539)
- Owner: Boy Scouts of America
- Location: West Chester
- Country: United States
- President: Steve Carroll
- Council Commissioner: Gus Sauerzopf
- Scout Executive: Jacob Segal
- Website http://www.cccbsa.org

The Chester County Council is a Boy Scouts of America service council that serves members of the Cub Scouts, Scouts BSA, and Venturing programs in Chester County, Pennsylvania and Northeastern Cecil County, Maryland.

==== Camps ====
Horseshoe Scout Reservation

- Camp Ware (Peach Bottom, Pennsylvania)
- Camp Horseshoe (Rising Sun, Maryland)

==== Order of the Arrow ====
Lodge 22

=== Chief Cornplanter Council ===
Chief Cornplanter Council #538
- Headquarters: Warren
- Country: United States
- Scout Executive: Raymond Tennent
- Website cornplanterbsa.org

Known as "America's Oldest Council," CCC is the oldest existing, continuously registered council in the United States. In 1910, members of the community of Warren first explored Scouting activities. In 1913, the Boy Scouts of America gave a charter to an organization known as the Warren County Council. Then in 1954 the council's official name was changed to Chief Cornplanter Council to honor the famous Seneca-Iroquois war chief and diplomat. In 2013, the council celebrated its 100th anniversary as the longest-tenured, unmerged Boy Scout Council in America.

==== Camps ====
- Camp Olmsted

==== Order of the Arrow ====
- Gyantwachia Lodge #255

=== Columbia-Montour Council ===
Columbia-Montour Council #504
- Headquarters: Bloomsburg
- President: Barry Lewis
- Commissioner: Rose Rhoads
- Scout Executive: Paul Knox
- Website columbiamontourbsa.org

Columbia-Mountour Council is headquartered in Bloomsburg. It serves Columbia and Montour counties. The council operates Camp Lavigne with an office at 35 Camp Lavigne Road, Benton. During the summer season Camp Lavigne conducts a Boy Scout summer camp program, Cub Scout and Webelos Scout resident program, as well as a Cub Day Camp program. During the non-summer season, Camp Lavigne hosts a Klondike Derby, Cub Winter Fun Day, Orienteering Competition, Cub Skill Weekend, and Haunted Harvest Fest. The council's Order of the Arrow lodge is Wyona Lodge #18.

=== Cradle of Liberty Council ===
Cradle of Liberty Council #525
- Owner: Boy Scouts of America
- Headquarters: Philadelphia
- Country: United States
- Founded: 1996
- President: T. Roderick Henkels
- Council Commissioner: Stephen Perrone
- Scout Executive: Daniel Templar
- Website http://www.colbsa.org/

The Cradle of Liberty Council (#525) is a Boy Scouts of America council created in 1996 with the merger of the former Philadelphia Council (covering the city and county of Philadelphia) and the former Valley Forge Council (covering Delaware and Montgomery counties).

==== Camps ====
- Resica Falls Scout Reservation (East Stroudsburg)
- Musser Scout Reservation (Marlborough Township)
- Treasure Island Scout Reservation (closed)

==== Order of the Arrow ====
- Unami Lodge #1

=== French Creek Council ===
French Creek Council (#532)
- Owner: Boy Scouts of America
- Headquarters: Erie
- Country: United States
- Founded: 1972
- President: Patty Meehan
- Scout Executive: Steven E. Dunn
- Website; Frenchcreek-BSA.org

The French Creek Council serves scouts in six counties in northwestern Pennsylvania and Brookfield Township in Ohio. The council was organized in 1972 from a merger of the former Washington Trail Council of Erie, Custaloga Council of Sharon, and Colonel Drake Council of Oil City. Its headquarters is located in Erie, PA. The council is divided into two districts: Lakes and Rivers, to effectively execute operations across Northwest Pennsylvania.

==== Camps ====
- Custaloga Town Scout Reservation (Carlton)

==== Order of the Arrow ====
- Langundowi Lodge #46

=== Hawk Mountain Council ===
Hawk Mountain Council #528
- Owner: Boy Scouts of America
- Headquarters: Reading
- Country: United States
- Founded: 1970
- President: Joseph Hartz
- Scout Executive: Davis Fox
- Website hmc-bsa.org

The Hawk Mountain Council serves Berks, Schuylkill, and Carbon counties in Pennsylvania. The council has headquarters near Reading, PA. The Council was formed in 1970 with the merger of the Appalachian Trail and Daniel Boone councils.

==== Camps ====
- Hawk Mountain Scout Reservation

==== Order of the Arrow ====
- Kittatinny Lodge #5

=== Juniata Valley Council ===
Juniata Valley Council CSP (#497)
- Owner: Boy Scouts of America
- Headquarters: Reedsville
- Country: United States
- Scout Executive: Jeffery Pickett
- Website jvcbsa.org

Blair, Huntingdon, Mifflin, Centre & Juniata Counties

==== Camps ====
- Seven Mountains Scout Camp

==== Order of the Arrow ====
- Monaken Lodge #103

=== Laurel Highlands Council ===
Laurel Highlands Council
- Owner: Boy Scouts of America
- Headquarters: Pittsburgh
- Country: United States
- Founded: July 1, 2011
- Scout Executive: Todd McGregor
- Website https://www.lhcscouting.org/

Laurel Highlands Council serves youth in Allegheny, Beaver, Bedford, Blair, Cambria, Greene, Indiana, Somerset, and Washington counties in Pennsylvania; Grant, Hampshire, Hardy, and Mineral counties in West Virginia; and Allegany and Garrett counties of Maryland. Laurel Highlands Council was formed when the Greater Pittsburgh and Penn's Woods Councils merged in 2011. Potomac Council was then added in 2014.

==== Camps ====
- Camp Anawanna
- Camp Baker
- Camp Guyasuta
- Heritage Reservation (containing camps Liberty, Freedom, Eagle Base, and Independence)
- Camp Potomac
- Camp Seph Mack
- Camp Twin Echo. (1928-2020) closed July 2020

==== Order of the Arrow ====
- Allohak Menewi Lodge 57

=== Minsi Trails Council ===
Minsi Trails Council #502
- Owner: Boy Scouts of America
- Headquarters: Allentown
- Founded: 1969
- President: Dave Zinkler
- Commissioner: Lew Dryfoos
- Scout Executive: Kevin McClelland
- Website minsitrails.com

Minsi Trails Council serves Scouts of eastern Pennsylvania's Lehigh Valley and Pocono regions as well as parts of western New Jersey. The council serves six counties: Lehigh, Northampton, Monroe, Carbon, Luzerne, and Warren.

The council was formed in 1969, after the merger of the Bethlehem Area, Delaware Valley Area, and Lehigh councils. The council consists of six districts and maintains two camping properties: Camp Minsi in Pocono Summit, and Trexler Scout Reservation in Jonas.

==== Districts ====
- Anthracite District
- Forks of Delaware District
- North Valley District
- Pocono District
- South Mountain District
- Trexler District

On January 1, 2021 Minsi Trails Council realigned its districts by counties to form Carbon-Luzerne District, Lehigh District, Monroe District, Northampton District, and Warren District.

==== Camps ====
- Camp Minsi (Pocono Summit, Pennsylvania)
- Trexler Scout Reservation (Jonas, Pennsylvania) Now no longer a Scout camp. Final season was 2023

==== Order of the Arrow ====
- Witauchsoman Lodge #44

=== Moraine Trails Council ===
Moraine Trails Council #500
- Owner: Boy Scouts of America
- Headquarters: Butler
- Location: Lawrence, Butler, Armstrong, and NW Westmoreland counties; Pennsylvania
- Country: United States
- Scout Executive: Ray Tennent
- Website morainetrails.org

==== Districts ====
- Glacier Ridge District (Butler)
- King Beaver District (Lawrence)
- River Valley District (Armstrong/NW Westmoreland Counties)

==== Camps ====
- Camp Bucoco

==== Order of the Arrow ====
- Kuskitannee Lodge #168

=== New Birth of Freedom Council ===
New Birth of Freedom Council #544
- Owner: Boy Scouts of America
- Headquarters: Mechanicsburg
- Country: United States
- Founded: April 1, 2010
- Scout Executive: Ron Gardner
- Website newbirthoffreedom.org

The New Birth of Freedom Council serves south-central Pennsylvania. The council was formed by a merger of the York-Adams Area Council and Keystone Area Council on April 1, 2010.

=== Northeastern Pennsylvania Council ===
Northeastern Pennsylvania Council #501
- Owner: Boy Scouts of America
- Headquarters: Moosic
- Country: United States
- Founded: 1990
- President: Marianne Gilmartin
- Commissioner: Rick Stritzinger
- Scout Executive: Kevin Bishop
- Website nepabsa.org

Northeastern Pennsylvania Council, with headquarters in Moosic, formed in 1990 from the merger of the Forest Lakes and Penn Mountains councils. The council serves units in Lackawanna, Luzerne, Pike, Wayne, and Wyoming counties. Its Order of the Arrow lodge is Lowwapaneu Lodge #191. It has two districts: Two Mountains and Dan Beard. The council operates two camps: Goose Pond Scout Reservation and Camp Acahela. Since its founding the council has conducted a biennial Traveling Camporee that takes Scouts to camp at locations that rotate among Williamsburg, Virginia, Baltimore Maryland, Boston, Massachusetts, Niagara Falls, New York, and Pittsburgh, Pennsylvania.

Camps

- Camp Acahela
- Goose Pond Scout Reservation

=== Pennsylvania Dutch Council ===
Pennsylvania Dutch Council #524
- Owner: Boy Scouts of America
- Headquarters: Lancaster
- Founded: 1971
- Scout Executive: Matthew Klutzaritz
- Website padutchbsa.org

Pennsylvania Dutch Council is in south-central Pennsylvania serving Lebanon and Lancaster counties. The council has two districts: Iron Forge and Susquehanna.

==== Camps- ====
- Bashore Scout Reservation
- J. Edward Mack Scout Reservation

==== Order of the Arrow ====
- Wunita Gokhos Lodge #39

=== Susquehanna Council ===
Susquehanna Council #533
- Owner: Boy Scouts of America
- Headquarters: Williamsport
- Country: United States
- President: Robert Dluge
- Council Commissioner: R. "Butch" McCusker
- Scout Executive: Dennis Dugan
- Website susquehannabsa.org

==== Camps ====
- Camp Karoondinha (Glen Iron)

==== Order of the Arrow ====
- Woapeu Sisilija Lodge #343

=== Washington Crossing Council ===
Washington Crossing Council(#777)
- Owner: Boy Scouts of America
- Headquarters: Doylestown
- Country: United States
- President: William Pfundt
- Scout Executive: Magne Gundersen
- Website wccscounting.org

The Washington Crossing Council (formerly Bucks County Council) serves Bucks County, PA, Hunterdon County, NJ, and Mercer County, NJ.

=== Westmoreland-Fayette Council ===
The Westmoreland Fayette Council was formed in 1937. The council is made up of three districts, Old Trails District based primarily out of Fayette County, Bushy Run District based primarily in Westmoreland County along with Laurel Hills District also based primarily in Westmoreland County. Throughout the time in which the council has been serving there have been 6 different districts. These districts were Braddock Trails, Bushy Run, Chestnut Ridge, Forbes, Laurel Hills, and Old Trails Districts.

Westmoreland-Fayette Council #512
- Owner: Boy Scouts of America
- Headquarters: Greensburg
- Scout Executive: Marcus Ragland
- Website wfbsa.org

==== Camps ====
- Camp Conestoga
- Camp Buck Run
- Camp Tenacharison

==== Past camps ====
- Camp Wesco
- Camp Wildwood
- Camp Pleasant
- Camp Paul Bunyan

==== Order of the Arrow ====
- Wagion Lodge #6

== Girl Scouting today ==
Girl Scouting in Pennsylvania
- Map of Girl Scout Councils in Pennsylvania

There are four Girl Scout councils serving girls in Pennsylvania. Three of them—Eastern Pennsylvania, Heart of Pennsylvania, and Western Pennsylvania—are headquartered in the state. The fourth council, NYPENN Pathways, is headquartered in New York.

=== Girl Scouts of Eastern Pennsylvania ===
Girl Scouts of Eastern Pennsylvania was created by a merger on April 28, 2007 between the Girl Scouts of Freedom Valley, Southeastern Pennsylvania, and Great Valley Councils. The merger became effective on May 1. Girl Scouts of Eastern Pennsylvania serves Berks, Bucks, Carbon, Chester, Delaware, Lehigh, Montgomery, Northampton, and Philadelphia counties. The current CEO is Kim E. Fraites-Dow.

Girl Scouts of Eastern Pennsylvania
- Owner: GSUSA
- Headquarters: Miquon
- Country: United States
- Chief Executive Officer: Kim E. Fraites-Dow
- Website gsep.org

==== Camps ====
During the summer, Eastern Pennsylvania camps are open for all registered Girl Scouts. The camp is operated by paid staff who work for the council. Campers sign up for a program session of their choice, which can be as short as two nights and as long as four weeks. Each program has its own themed activities. Campers are also asked at the start of the week what they would like to do (this is called Girl Planning,) and the activities they choose are worked into their schedule.

In the summer of 2025, camps Wood Haven and Mountain House adopted a "classic camp" model. This eliminated the themed programs for the two camps, and instead had campers sign up for themeless week-long sessions with more girl planning time. This model was discontinued for the summer 2026 season.

During the school year, the camps are open for anybody to rent. Troops are allowed to rent out the sites for their own events, and entire service units can rent out the sites for "Camporees." People outside of Girl Scouts are also allowed to rent the sites for events like weddings, field trips, and school dances. Girl Scouts are generally supervised by volunteers during off-season camping, but paid staff may be present to facilitate activities like swimming and ropes courses. The council also holds events at the camps throughout the year.

- Camp Laughing Waters is an overnight camp in Gilbertsville (Montgomery County). It is 400 acres (160 ha). Campers may stay in platform tents or cabins. Activities include horseback riding, a high ropes and low ropes course, a climbing wall, bouldering, disc golf, gaga, archery, and swimming in a pool. It is currently directed by Caroline "Smilez" Rahmlow.
- Camp Mosey Wood is an overnight camp in White Haven (Carbon County). The camp is 425 acres (172 ha) with a 13-acre (5.3 ha) lake. Campers may stay in platform tents or a lodge. Activities include dueling ziplines, two high ropes courses, a low ropes course, two climbing walls, a bouldering wall, archery, gaga, and swimming and boating in the lake. It is currently directed by April "Ape" Beattie.
- Camp Mountain House is a day camp in Allentown (Lehigh County). Activities include a low ropes course, a greenhouse, gaga, and archery.
- Camp Shelly Ridge is the only camp in the council to offer both day and overnight options. It is located in Miquon (Montgomery County) and also serves as the council headquarters. There is also a council shop onsite with a Build-A-Bear Workshop. Overnight campers may stay in platform tents or a lodge. Activities include a low ropes course, a climbing wall, bouldering, gaga, archery, and swimming in a pool. It is currently directed by Amanda "Perry" Hunsberger.
- Camp Valley Forge is a day camp in Valley Forge (Chester County). Alongside camp, it holds one of the council's shops and a museum of Girl Scout history. Activities include a low ropes course, archery, gaga, and swimming in a pool.
- Camp Wood Haven is an overnight camp in Pine Grove (Schuylkill County). Campers may stay in platform tents, Adirondack shelters, Conestoga wagons, or Birdsong, which is a treehouse. Activities include horseback riding, archery, a low ropes course, a climbing wall, a "tree element" (a high ropes element where participants propel themselves up a rope), gaga, and swimming in a pool.

==== Past camps ====
On June 16, 2011, the council decided to divest in Camp Tweedale, Camp Tohikanee, and Camp Hidden Falls.

- Camp Hidden Falls was an overnight camp in Dingmans Ferry (Pike County). It closed in 2012 and became a part of the National Park Service's Delaware Water Gap National Recreation Area.
- Camp Tohikanee was a day camp in Quakertown (Bucks County). It closed in 2015 and is now an independent campsite called Tohi.
- Camp Tweedale was an overnight camp in Oxford (Chester County). It closed in 2015 and was sold to the Chester Water Authority in 2016.
- Philly Camp was a low-cost day camp program for Girl Scouts who lived within a Philadelphia zip code. It ran for four weeks in roaming locations across the city. This program was discontinued for the summer 2026 season.

==== Other Properties ====
- Jane Seltzer is a shop and service center in Philadelphia.
- Luella is a mobile shop van that stops at locations around the council.

=== Girl Scouts in the Heart of Pennsylvania ===
Girl Scouts in the Heart of Pennsylvania was formed on May 1, 2007 through the merger of Hemlock (Harrisburg), Penn Laurel (York), Penn's Woods (Wilkes-Barre), and Scranton-Pocono (Scranton) Girl Scout councils.

Girl Scouts in the Heart of Pennsylvania
- Owner: GSUSA
- Headquarters: Camp Hill
- Country: United States
- President and CEO: Janet Donovan
- Website www.gshpa.org

==== Camps ====
- Camp Archbald is an overnight camp in Kingsley (Susquehanna County). It was established in 1920.
- Camp Furnace Hills is an troops-only camp in Denver (Lancaster County). Activities include gaga, archery, and events surrounding Foxfire House, a historical building onsite. Campers stay in houses or covered wagons. About 175 acres (71 ha) of the property was sold in late 2017, but about 50 acres (20 ha) of the property remain open to campers.
- Camp Happy Valley is an troops-only camp in Fairfield (Adams County). It has few activities and primarily serves as a place for troops to stay overnight. Campers may sleep in cabins, primitive tents, or lodges.
- Camp Small Valley is an overnight camp in Halifax (Dauphin County). At 762 acres (308 ha), it is the largest of the council's camps. Activities include a high ropes course, low ropes course, a climbing tower, a giant swing, a nature center, gaga, archery, volleyball, and swimming in a pool. Campers may sleep in cabins, tents, or yurts.

==== Past Camps ====
In late 2017, GSHPA announced that they would be selling Camp Echo Trail, Camp Golden Pond, Camp Louise, and 175 acres (71 ha) of Camp Furnace Hills, as maintaining all seven camps would have required 57% of their annual budget.

- Camp Echo Trail was a camp in Chanceford Township (York County). It was purchased in 2018 and is now River Hill Retreat, a camp for terminally ill and disabled children.
- Camp Golden Pond was a camp in Petersburg (Huntingdon County). A group of community members called the Friends of Golden Pond purchased the property in 2019, and it is now a campsite and wedding venue.
- Camp Louise was a camp in Shickshinny (Luzerne County). It was purchased in 2019 by Valley Preservation LLC, who leased it to the Friends of Camp Louise. In 2021, it opened for group camping rentals.

==== Other Locations ====
- GSHPA's headquarters is in Camp Hill (Cumberland County).
- The council holds a satellite office in Williamsport (Lycoming County).

=== Girl Scouts Western Pennsylvania ===
The Western Pennsylvania Council was formed through the merger of five regional councils: Keystone, Girl Scouts of Beaver and Lawrence Counties, Girl Scouts of Penn Lakes Council, Girl Scouts of Talus Rock Council, and Girl Scouts-Trillium Council.

Girl Scouts Western Pennsylvania
- Owner: GSUSA
- Headquarters: Pittsburgh
- Country: United States
- Scout Executive: Patricia A. Burkart
- Website gswpa.org

==== Camps ====
- Camp Conshatawba is an overnight camp in Ebensburg (Cambria County). Campers may stay in cabins or platform tents. Activities include a climbing tower, zipline, low ropes, swimming in a pool or creek, a nature center, a tomahawk range, and archery. It is currently directed by Alicia "Gilly" Reedy.
- Camp Hawthorne Ridge is an overnight camp in Fairview Township, Erie County. It is 207 acres (0.84 km^{2}). Campers may stay in cabins or platform tents. Activities include swimming in a pool, archery, and a slingshot range. It is currently directed by Mikayla "Daisy" Kirschner.
- Camp Skymeadow is an overnight camp in Avonmore (Westmoreland County). Campers may stay in cabins or platform tents. Activities include horseback riding, fishing and canoeing in ponds, swimming in a pool, archery, and hatchet throwing. It is currently directed by Rowan "Bug" Curry.

==== Past Camps ====
- Camp Redwing was a camp in Renfrew (Butler County). It closed on June 25, 2025 to evaluate necessary repairs to the pool and water systems, and to mitigate creek flooding. On October 30, 2025, the council announced that the costs of maintaining or moving the camp exceeded what it could sustain, and that they would be permanently closing and selling the camp.

==== Other Properties ====
- The Western Pennsylvania council has two retail stores: one in Pittsburgh and one in Edinboro. They had a store and office in Greensburg, which closed in 2025.
- Attached to the Edinboro store is the Edinboro Activity Center, featuring a STEM lab, fire circle, gaga pit, and life-sized board games.
- The council owns a three-story building in Johnstown for operations, but they are currently selling the building and plan to move into a smaller office.

== International Scouting units ==
- There are Homenetmen Armenian Scouts in Philadelphia.
- Külföldi Magyar Cserkészszövetség Hungarian Scouting maintains two troops in Philadelphia and one in Pittsburgh.
