= Valley Forge Pilgrimage =

Coordinates: 40.09691°N 75.44139°W

Valley Forge Pilgrimage and Encampment
- 2009 emblems
- Owner: Cradle of Liberty Council
- Date: February 22, 1913

The Valley Forge Pilgrimage and Encampment is the oldest annual scouting event in the world. It was first held on February 22, 1913 (George Washington's 181st birthday), and has been held every year since. The event is hosted by the Cradle of Liberty Council and commemorates the soldiers of the Continental Army who braved the winter of 1777-78 at Valley Forge. Each year more than 2,000 brave the winter chill of the Delaware Valley to participate.

== History ==
Boy Scouts of America (BSA) was only three years old, and was sweeping the country when approximately 300 Scouts from Philadelphia and suburban Delaware and Montgomery Counties took part in the first pilgrimage.

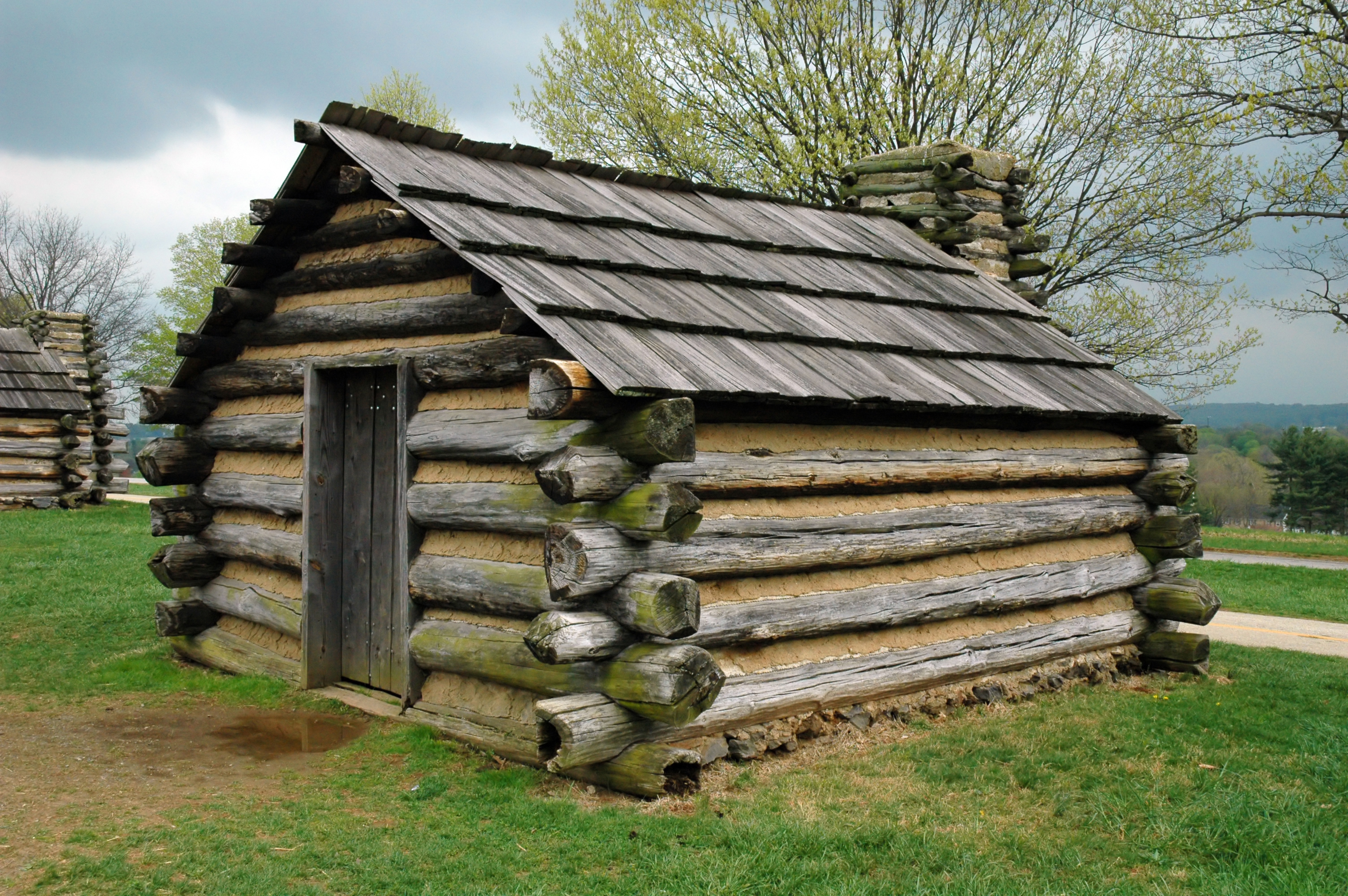
Valley Forge Cabin

Typical attendance ranged from 125 to 275 Scouts and leaders until the Great Depression. The event has been held every year, even during the Depression and World War II, though the event was then held at a reduced scale. In the early years, Scouts traveled to Valley Forge by train and foot, arriving at the Valley Forge Train Station.

The event was organized by an Episcopal priest, Rev. Dr. W. Herbert Burk of Norristown. Burk had also been instrumental in building the Washington Memorial Chapel at Valley Forge. Burk continued to be involved in the planning for the annual pilgrimage for the next two decades. The term "pilgrimage" was chosen because every participating troop lined up in formation with their flags and paraded to the chapel for the memorial service for George Washington.

The first official overnight Valley Forge Encampment in connection with a pilgrimage was in 1948. Prior to that there were many unofficial camp outs on the site, as the area was relatively rural and unpopulated. General John Pershing and Daniel Carter Beard have both been featured guests. The biggest crowd was at the 1932 pilgrimage, which marked Washington's 200th birthday. An estimated 9,000 Boy Scouts from Pennsylvania and neighboring states, plus 10,000 adults and children, were on hand.

== Events ==
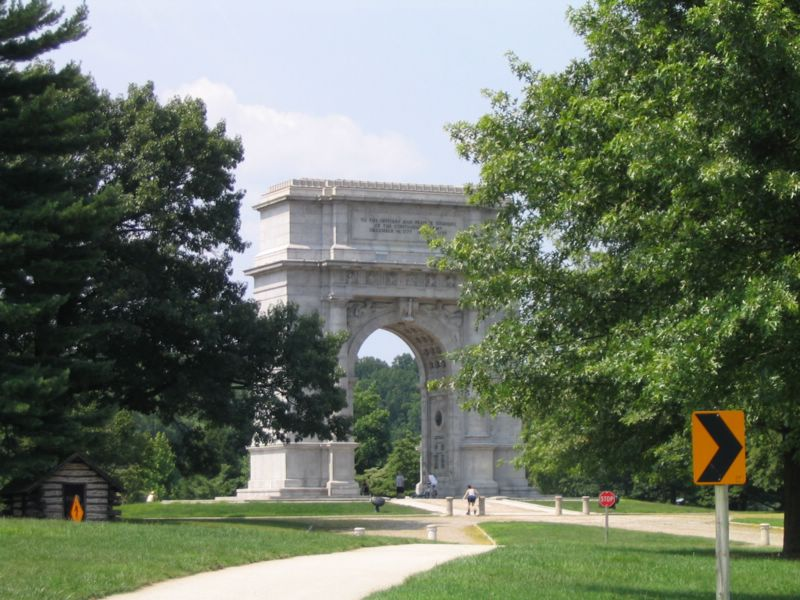
National Memorial Arch

The event itself is divided into two parts: the Encampment, in which Scouts camp from Friday through Sunday on the Presidents' Day weekend, and the Pilgrimage which is all day Saturday. During the Pilgrimage, participants move around the Valley Forge NHP to hear volunteer interpreters from the National Park Service tell how the Continentals lived. Replicas of the original huts provide a glimpse of daily life. Conditions during the winter were poor, so the stories are also told how more than 2,000 soldiers died from typhus, dysentery, typhoid and pneumonia.

== Themes ==
- 1950- log cabin appeared on pilgrimage patch
- 1951- Log cabin appeared on pilgrimage patch
- 1952- Log cabin appeared on pilgrimage patch
- 1953- Log cabin appeared on pilgrimage patch
- 1954-
- 1955- Log cabin appeared on pilgrimage patch
- 1956- Log cabin appeared on pilgrimage patch
- 1957- Log cabin appeared on pilgrimage patch
- 1958- Washington memorial appeared on pilgrimage patch
- 1959- Lincoln and Washington heads on pilgrimage patch
- 1960- Washington on horseback appeared on pilgrimage/encampment silk patch
- 1961- Washington memorial appeared on pilgrimage patch; soldier on watch on encampment patch.
- 1962- Sillouette of Washington appeared on pilgrimage patch; soldier by cook fire on encampment patch.
- 1963- Wake & Midway bells from chapel's carillon appeared on pilgrimage patch; soldier by fire on encampment patch.
- 1964- Canon and pickets appeared on pilgrimage patch; soldier cutting wood with axe on encampment patch.
- 1965- Star Redoubt appeared on pilgrimage patch; soldier using shovel appeared on encampment patch.
- 1966- Washington on horseback appeared on pilgrimage patch; soldier playing drum appeared on encampment patch.
- 1967- Soldier in snow with cabins in background appeared on pilgrimage patch; soldier working as blacksmith appeared on encampment patch.
- 1968- Duportail Designer of the Encampment appeared on pilgrimage patch; soldier next to cannon appeared on encampment patch.
- 1969- Valley Forge Memorial Arch appeared on pilgrimage patch; soldier walking with bucket appeared on encampment patch.
- 1970- House - Washington's HQ appeared on pilgrimage patch; soldier carrying firewood next to fire appeared on encampment patch.
- 1971- Soldier in snow with cabins in background appeared on pilgrimage patch
- 1972- Cabin in snow appeared on pilgrimage patch
- 1973- Statue of Mad Anthony Wayne appeared on pilgrimage patch
- 1974- Von Steuben appeared on pilgrimage patch
- 1975- Washington's tent appeared on pilgrimage patch
- 1976- Soldiers huddling around fire appeared on pilgrimage patch
- 1977- Washington kneeling in prayer appeared on pilgrimage patch
- 1978- Washington memorial appeared on pilgrimage patch
- 1979- Valley Forge Arch Memorial appeared on pilgrimage patch
- 1980- Watch tower appeared on pilgrimage patch
- 1981- Cabin in snow appeared on pilgrimage patch
- 1982- Continental soldier in the snow appeared on pilgrimage patch
- 1983- Soldiers' hut in snow appeared on pilgrimage patch
- 1984- Canon appeared on pilgrimage patch
- 1985- Major General Duportail appeared on pilgrimage patch
- 1986- Major General Greene appeared on pilgrimage patch
- 1987- Jubilee Pilgrimage Washington appeared on pilgrimage patch
- 1988- General Anthony Wayne appeared on pilgrimage patch
- 1989- General Henry Knox appeared on pilgrimage patch
- 1990- General Sullivan appeared on pilgrimage patch
- 1991- Brigadier General Varnum appeared on pilgrimage patch
- 1992- Colonel Daniel Morgan appeared on pilgrimage patch
- 1993- Centennial of Valley Forge Park - log cabin appeared on pilgrimage patch
- 1994- [Drum Corps?]Drum appeared on pilgrimage patch
- 1995- The common soldier
- 1996- Harry Lee - Light Horse appeared on pilgrimage patch
- 1997- Brigadier General Mulhenberg appeared on encampment patch
- 1998- Martha Washington appeared on Pilgrimage Patch, A Private in the 1st Rhode Island Regiment appeared on Encampment Patch
- 1999- Nathanial Green appeared on pilgrimage patch,
- 2000- Louis Le Beque Duportail - surveyors & engineers - appeared on pilgrimage patch
- 2001- Henry Knox - artillery - appeared on pilgrimage patch
- 2002- Christopher Ludwig - baker general - appeared on Pilgrimage Patch, Supply Wagon appears on Encampment Patch
- 2003- 225th anniversary of the American Revolution
- 2004- General William Alexander appeared on pilgrimage patch, encampment patch featured cannons.
- 2005- Alexander Hamilton Aide-De-Campappeared on pilgrimage patch
- 2006 - Benjamin Franklin appeared on the pilgrimage patch, Continental Artillery on the encampment patch
- 2007— Allan Mclane, Washington's right-hand man, who also played a large role in the Revolution's spies. McLane, known as the unknown hero, appeared on the Pilgrimage patch. Oneida Nation - Native American appeared on encampment patch.
- 2008— Lt. Col. John Laurens, aide-de-camp to General Washington and wounded three times, appeared on the Pilgrimage patch. He later died.
- 2009— Baron Johann de Kalb, major general in the Continental Army. Much beloved hero - many counties, towns and streets named for de Kalb. He appeared on the Pilgrimage patch.
- 2010- Captain Robert Kirkwood of the Delaware Militia is honored. The militia's flag appears on the encampment patch.
- 2011- The Marquis de Lafayette is honored. He appears on the Pilgrimage patch.
- 2012- George Washington to be honored. The 2012 event was the 100th anniversary of the Valley Forge Pilgrimage & Encampment. The Pilgrimage patch was a 100 featuring General George Washington and Dr. W Herbert Burk, a founder of the Encampment. The Encampment patch featured Polly Cooper.
- 2013- Camp-followers are honored. A "shadowed" image of the followers appears on the Encampment patch, and the Pilgrimage patch features a "shadowed" image of a woman. (Martha Washington, Abigail Adams, or "Molly Pitcher")
- 2014- The theme was Henry Lee III (Light Horse Harry) and the US Light Dragoons. The Encampment patch features a flag for the Light Dragoons and the Pilgrimage patch features a horse and Light Horse Harry.
- 2015 - Theme honored the common soldier. Image of Benjamin Franklin appears on both pilgrimage and encampment patches.
- 2016 - General Casimir Polanksi appears on the pilgrimage patch. The encampment was shut down on Saturday afternoon due to inclement weather.

== See also ==
- Scouting in Pennsylvania
