= Gaga (game) =

Variant of dodgeball

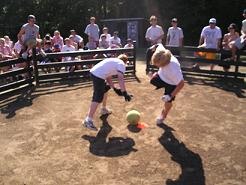
Octagonal Ga-ga court in Bennington, Indiana, at Camp Livingston

Gaga (Hebrew: גע גע; lit. 'touch touch') (also: ga-ga, gaga ball, or ga-ga ball) is a variant of dodgeball that is played in a gaga "pit". The game combines dodging, striking, running, and jumping, with the objective of being the last person standing. Players hit the ball at each other with their hands, and are eliminated if the ball strikes them on or below the knee. The game can be played by a group of individual players or with teams, as well as in one-on-one matches. Rules, ball types, pit surfaces, and pit sizes can vary widely at different venues.

== Gameplay ==
Gaga is played in a large fenced-in area (usually an octagon or hexagon) called a gaga pit. The gaga pit generally consists of flat walls atop a smooth dirt, turf, sand, or rubberized surface. The gaga ball can vary in size and form, generally ranging from a foam dodgeball to a rubber kickball. In some games, the ball may not actually take the shape of a sphere if the proper equipment is not available. The game begins when one player or a referee throws the gaga ball into the air; while the players' backs or hands are set against the wall, they shout "Ga” on each of the three bounces. After three bounces, the ball is in play, and the players may leave the wall and hit the ball at each other in the pit. A player who is hit by the ball or breaks a rule is eliminated and must leave the game. Players may not hit the ball twice in a row, and a player who causes the ball to leave the pit is out. When the ball is caught in the air on a fly, the last person to hit the ball is out.

== General rules ==
1. A player can hit the ball with their hands, but picking up the ball and throwing it at a player is not allowed. Some versions do not permit scooping, or curling one's fingers while hitting the ball, so as to project the ball into the air. In some games, only open hand hits are allowed to prevent striking injury to small children and also to enable greater control of the ball, keeping it low and inbounds.
2. A players knees or lower legs may not touch the ground as an act of defense. This is often referred to as turtling. If the player unintentionally touches the ground with their knee no penalty is assigned. However, players will often target a player who has done so numerous times as to avoid further explicit turtling.
3. If the ball touches a player anywhere on or below the knee (in some versions, below the ankle or waist), that player is eliminated from the game. If a player hits themself with the ball on or below their own knee they are out.
4. A player may not hit the ball out of the pit. The penalty for breaking this rule is assigned to the last player to touch the ball before leaving the pit, rather than to the original hitter. Because this provision can result in a strategy of hitting the ball upwards to eliminate another player, the rule prohibiting scooping attempts to discourage this. In some versions, an exception is made if the ball hits a wall or the ground before leaving the pit; in this scenario, the exit is deemed to be the result of a ricochet, and the player is not eliminated.
5. Holding or otherwise using the wall to assist a jump is termed "spidering" and is prohibited. However, some variations allow spidering.
6. No player may hit the ball twice in a row, unless the ball comes into contact with the wall or another player between touches. This rule is sometimes expanded to include "self-serving," which prevents the player that served the ball from being the first to touch the ball. Some sets of rules may allow double-hitting if enough players have been eliminated, usually when there are two players left.
7. In some variations, if a player pops the ball up into the air, another player may catch it and ground it. The other player is then out. However, most variations prohibit catching completely.
8. When a player gets out, that player must step out of the pit completely to show that they have been eliminated.
9. A player must start the game with one of their hands (or some versions feet) touching the wall of the pit; however, some versions do not make it a rule to touch the pit as the game starts. One player or a referee has to throw the ball in and have it bounce thrice and chant "ga-ga-ball" (Some versions use "ga-ga-go", "ga-ga", or "ga-ga-ga", among others). If a player removes their hand (or foot) off the wall before the third bounce, they are eliminated.
10. The winner of the last game has the right to serve to start the next game.

Other rules may be added as necessary, and some may choose to play without all of the above rules. Additional rules that vary in frequency of implementation include the prohibition of blocking (using one's hands as a barrier between the ball and one's feet, rather than jumping), crouching, playing on the ground, and rolling. In other variations, an additional ball may enter play towards the end of the game if the two or three remaining players are making slow progress. Commonly, there will be a 20-second count down when play is too slow and only 2 or 3 players remain. At the end of the countdown, a new game is started.

== Origin of the game ==
The origins of gaga have remained largely a mystery since its first appearance in the mid-20th century, though the predominant theory is that it was invented in Israel and exported to other countries around the world, usually as a game played by children at summer camps.

=== Australia ===
Competitive gaga was reportedly popular in the Australian Jewish communities of Perth, Western Australia, in the 1980s, primarily through the exchange of Israeli madrikhim (counselors) to Australia, or Australian madrikhim returning from Israel. Although those claims remain largely anecdotal, fans of the game often cite Australia as a country in which the gaga community was especially active.

=== North America ===
Gaga is most frequently said to have been brought to the United States by Israeli counselors working at Jewish summer camps, arriving in the northeastern region as early as the 1950s, then spreading nationwide over the ensuing decades.

Gaga in the modern day is frequently played at summer camps and on school playgrounds, as the means for a pit's construction are typically less expensive than other games requiring structures (e.g., steel soccer goals).

=== Mainstream gaga ===
In July 2012, The New York Times wrote that, "to the surprise of parents who recall the game from their youths, gaga is solidly mainstream." Among the things that contributed to gaga's expansion, the article credits children's love of the game. "They are teaching it to their parents and not vice versa. It's not like baseball or football or tennis, where they have to emulate someone else. Kids own it."

Gaga continued its U.S. expansion to Manhattan with the 2011 opening of The Gaga Center, New York's first facility dedicated to the sport.

=== Tablet magazine investigation ===
In 2016 and 2017, Tablet magazine reporter Stephen Silver wrote a two-part investigation of gaga's origins, sifting through the various theories and rumors that had circulated over the preceding 60 years. In the second of the two articles, titled "Is the Mystery of Ga-Ga, Everyone's Favorite Summer-Camp Game, Finally Solved?" Silver interviewed a 61-year-old native of Baltimore, Maryland, Steve Steinberg, who claimed to have invented gaga ball in 1975 as a teenage camp counselor to six-year-old boys at Camp Milldale, a Jewish Community Center camp in the Baltimore area. "[Steinberg] says he started the game for the same reason it’s still played today at countless summer camps," Silver wrote, "to keep campers busy on rainy days." Contrary to the theory that the game's name derives from the Hebrew word meaning "touch-touch," Steinberg explained to Silver that during a moment of frustration with his campers, he'd told them that they "all look like a bunch of babies," and that the children responded by chanting "goo-goo, ga-ga." Steinberg said that the game became very popular with his campers, and that he eventually shortened the name to "ga-ga" so that it would fit on the printed activity schedule. The Steinberg story has been repeated in many other magazines, journals and blogs across the country.

== In popular culture ==
- In the season 8 episode of Bob's Burgers, "Y Tu Ga-Ga Tambien", the students of Wagstaff become obsessed with gaga after it is introduced by guidance counsellor Mr. Frond. The game quickly takes over recess, becoming the only thing anyone wants to do or talk about. However, Gene feels that just because something is fun and popular doesn't mean it should be the only thing you want to do, and that others shouldn't be afraid to dislike it or want to do something else.

== See also ==
- Culture of Israel
- Israeli inventions and discoveries
- Sports in Israel
