= Laurel Highlands Council =

Scouting America council near Pittsburgh

- Owner: Scouting America
- Headquarters: Pittsburgh, Pennsylvania
- Country: United States
- Founded: July 1, 2011
- President: Scott Hardy
- Council Commissioner: Jack Boyde
- Scout Executive: Todd McGregor
- Website http://www.lhcscouting.org

The Laurel Highlands Council is the Scouting America council that serves youth in Allegheny, Beaver, Bedford, Blair, Cambria, Greene, Indiana, Somerset, and Washington counties in Pennsylvania; Grant, Hampshire, Hardy, and Mineral counties in West Virginia; and Allegany and Garrett counties in Maryland.

== History ==
In 1914, four years after the Scouting Movement was launched in the United States, the Allegheny County Council was chartered by the Boy Scouts of America. In 1921, the council was split into seven separate council units:

- Allegheny/Allegheny Valley Council
- Chartiers Council (McKees Rocks)
- East Boroughs Council (Wilkinsburg)
- Guyasuta Council (Aspinwall)
- Ohio Valley Council
- Pittsburgh Council
- South Hills Council (1928-merged with Pittsburgh Council to become Allegheny County Council, West).

In 1967, the former Nemacolin Trails Council in Washington, Pennsylvania, merged with the Allegheny Council in Pittsburgh to become the Allegheny Trails Council.

=== Allegheny Trails Council ===
Allegheny Trails Council existed from 1967 to 1992 and serviced half of Allegheny, Beaver, Greene and Washington counties. In 1993, Allegheny Trails Council merged with East Valley Area Council in Forest Hills to become the Greater Pittsburgh Council.

=== Greater Pittsburgh Council ===
Following the merger, the Council Office became flag plaza located near PPG Paint Arena. Greater Pittsburgh Council and Penn's Woods Council merged on July 1, 2011, to form Laurel Highlands Council.

=== Penn's Woods Council ===
In 1970, Blair-Bedford Area Council, William Penn Council, and Admiral Robert E. Peary Council, merged into Penn's Woods Council. Penn's Woods headquarters was in Ebensburg, PA and became a Council Service Center after the merger. In 2016, the Ebensburg office was closed and the Scout Store relocated to the Johnstown Galleria before moving to a nearby office park in 2024.

=== Potomac Council ===
Potomac Council was absorbed into Laurel Highlands Council in early 2014. The former Council office was sold in 2025 and a new Council Service Center and Scout Store was built at Camp Potomac and opened in September, 2026.

== Camps ==
=== Camp Anawanna ===
Camp Anawanna is a weekend camping site nestled on 350 acres in the foothills of rural Washington County, outside Amity. Camp Anawanna features several cabins, adirondack sites, and hiking trails.

=== Camp Baker ===
Camp Baker is a 164 acre weekend camping facility located next to Blackhawk High School in Chippewa, Beaver County. Camp Baker has several tent camping sites, adirondack shelters, hiking trails, and a large stone pavilion.

=== Camp Guyasuta ===
Camp Guyasuta was established in 1918 and is located in Allegheny County between Aspinwall and Sharpsburg near the banks of the Allegheny River. Currently, this former summer camp offers year-round merit badge classes and the McGinnis Conference Center.

Mary Darlington, great-granddaughter of James O'Hara, lived in a house (named "Guyasuta") on the land was forced to vacate the property during World War I when the Federal government took over the railroad lines as part of the war effort. While the government acquired the land it needed, Mary gave the Boy Scouts over 100 additional acres suitable for a camp. When she died in 1925, Mary bequeathed the land to the Scouting organization.

=== Heritage Reservation ===
Heritage Reservation
- Location: 300 Heritage Rd., Farmington, PA 15437
- Website https://www.lhcscouting.org/about-us/camping/heritage-reservation

Heritage Reservation opened in 1980 and is located on over 2000 acres in Farmington, Pennsylvania.

Heritage consists of four camps built around Lake Courage, a 270 acre manmade lake with over 6 miles of shoreline:

A view of the Heritage Reservation from Lake Courage.

- Camp Independence— Cub Scout camp
- Camp Liberty— Scouting America camp that utilizes the Patrol Cooking Method, where Scouts work with their patrols to cook meals.
- Camp Freedom— Scouting America camp that utilizes a dining hall for meals.
- Eagle Base— Scouting America and Venturing High Adventure camp

All four camps offer various activities and merit badge opportunities that vary based on age appropriateness, Scout Rank and weather.

=== Camp Potomac ===
Camp Potomac was founded in 1951 and is a former 114-acre Resident Camp located in Oldtown, Maryland. Camp Potomac is located central to Green Ridge State Forest, the C&O Canal Towpath, the Potomac River, other attractions in the area and features several cabins and campsites available for weekend camping.

=== Camp Seph Mack ===
Camp Seph Mack is located on Yellow Creek Lake near Penn Run, PA. Seph Mack encompasses approximately 200 acres within the boundaries of Yellow Creek State Park and lies along the north shore with almost 4,000 feet of lake frontage.

Camp Seph Mack takes its name from the late J. Sephus Mack of Indiana, the patriarch of the family that donated much of the land for youth activities in the 1930s. The William Penn Council, a predecessor to Laurel Highlands, first operated Seph Mack as a Boy Scout Camp in the late 1940s. The camp ceased operation in the late 1960s and was sold to the Commonwealth of Pennsylvania as part of the development of Yellow Creek State Park.

In 1980, Penn's Woods Council reacquired the camp through a long-term lease agreement with the state of Pennsylvania. During the winter of 2000, the waterfront and aquatic area were regraded and improved when the State drew down the lake's water level.

Seph Mack ceased operating as a summer camp after the 2019 season but remains open for weekend camping opportunities.

=== Camp Twin Echo ===
Camp Twin Echo was a scout camp near Ligoner, PA and was owned by the Laurel Highlands Council. It was sold in late 2020 and is no longer being used as a scout camp.

== Order of the Arrow ==
Allohak Menewi Lodge
- Website http://www.lodge57.org

The Order of the Arrow is represented by the Allohak Menewi Lodge. It supports the Scouting programs of the council through leadership, camping, and service.
