= Buckskin Council =

Boy Scouts of America local council

- Owner: Boy Scouts of America
- Headquarters: Charleston, West Virginia
- Location: Kentucky, Ohio, Virginia, West Virginia
- Country: United States
- Website https://www.buckskin.org

The Buckskin Council is the local council of the Scouting America that serves Scouts in Kentucky, Ohio, Virginia and West Virginia.

== Organization ==
The council is divided into several districts:

- Adena District
- Chief Cornstalk District
- Kootaga District
- Mountain Dominion District
- Seneca District
- Shawnee District

== History ==
Buckskin Council (#617)

In 1919, the Charleston Council was formed and operated for around 10 years before being renamed the Charleston Area Council as it began to grow. It kept this name until 1949. In 1949, the council name was changed to Buckskin Council.

In 1990, Chief Cornstalk Council (#756) was forced to merge with Buckskin due to financial issues. Chief Cornstalk Council had been created from many name changes and mergers. Starting as the Logan County Council (1926 - 1930), then renamed Logan-Boone Area Council (1930-1935). In 1934, the Kentucky-West Virginia Council (#626 - 1930 -1934) merged with the Logan-Boone Area Council. After the merger in 1935, the council renamed itself Logan-Boone-Mingo Area Council keeping that name until 1953. In 1953, they again renamed the Cornstalk Council. In 1954, they tweaked the name of the council to become Chief Cornstalk Council which lasted until the merger with Buckskin. However, in 1979, the Lonesome Pine Council (#203) was split and part of it came into the Chief Cornstalk Council.

In early 1991, Appalachian Council (#707), which was made up of 9 counties in West Virginia and Virginia, merged with Buckskin Council in a unique form called a division. The Appalachian Division operated a semi-as-a-separate council inside Buckskin for about two years before they fully merged. It was made up of Tazewell County, Bland County and Giles County in Virginia along with Mercer County, McDowell County, Monroe County, Summers County, Raleigh County and Wyoming County in West Virginia. Merger occurred due to the downturn of coal in the coal counties, which limited the revenue from donations for the council. The roots of the Appalachian Council were much like the Chief Cornstalk Council. Council #707 was originally known as the McDowell County Council (1925–1928). In 1928, it was renamed the Southern West Virginia Council which held until 1956. The original Appalachian Council (#673) served the Beckley, WV area from 1946 until 1955. In 1956, the Southern West Virginia Council (#707) and Appalachian Council (#673) merged, keeping the council number 707 but changing the name to the Appalachian Council, as it was known when it merged with Buckskin.

Tri-State Area Council (#672) merged with Buckskin Council on July 1, 2014. Tri-State started off as the Huntington Council (1919–1924). In 1924, it was renamed to Huntington Area Council until 1935. In 1928, the Ashland Council (#200 - 1918–1928) merged with the Huntington Area Council. In 1935, they renamed themselves as the Tri-State Area Council as they were serving parts of West Virginia, Kentucky, and Ohio.

Allohak Council (#616) dissolved on December 31, 2018, and merged into surrounding councils including Buckskin Council. Allohak started as Parkersburg Council (1919–1933). In 1933, it was renamed to Kootaga Area Council until 1990. In 1942, Kootaga Area Council merged with Southeastern Ohio Council (#464). When Kootaga Area Council merged with Central West Virginia Council (#616) and renamed itself to Allohak Council. During the 2019 merge with Buckskin Council, Wood (excluding Williamstown), Jackson, Ritchie, Calhoun, Roane, and Wirt counties of West Virginia and the communities of Belpre and Coolville joined Buckskin Council.

Today Buckskin Council serves areas in West Virginia (28 counties), Virginia (3 counties), Kentucky (3.5 counties), and Ohio (3.5 counties). The Summit Bechtel Reserve resides inside the Council's territory.

History

Charleston Council #617 founded 1919	Logan County Council #756 founded 1926	McDowell County Council #707 founded 1925
Charleston Area Council #617 renamed 1929	Logan-Boone Area Council #756 renamed 1930	Kentucky-West Virginia Council #626 founded 1930	Southern West Virginia Council #707 renamed 1928
Logan-Boone-Mingo Area Council #756 merged 1934	Lonesome Pine Council #203 founded 1934
Buckskin Council #617 renamed 1949	Appalachian Council #673 founded 1946
Cornstalk Council #756 renamed 1953
Chief Cornstalk Council #756 renamed 1954	Southern West Virginia Council #707 merged 1955
Appalachian Council #707 renamed 1956
Chief Cornstalk Council #756 merged 1979
Buckskin Council #617 merged 1990
Buckskin Council #617 merged 1991

Notes:

Family of Buckskin Council

Huntington Council #672 founded 1919
Huntington Area Council #672 renamed 1924
Huntington Area Council #672 merged 1928
Tri-State Area Council #672 renamed 1935

Ashland Council #200 founded 1918

== Camps ==
The Buckskin Council operates two camps: Camp Arrowhead located in Ona, West Virginia, and Camp Cherokee in Louisa, Kentucky. Camp Arrowhead hosts the council's Summer Camp Program. Additionally, national high adventure base Summit Bechtel Reserve is within the council's footprint.

== Previous Camps ==
As a consequence of the merge with Appalachian Council in 1991, Buckskin Council acquired Camp Minter in the Beckley area. Camp Minter is the first sale of camp properties in Buckskin Council's recent history.

Camp Kiashuta (also spelled Kiachuta), in Chester, Ohio, was sold by Buckskin Council in 2018 to Meigs County Park District with the Friends of Camp Kiashuta operating the camp.

Buckskin Scout Reservation, also referred to as Dilly's Mill, located in Dunmore, WV, in Pocahontas County, WV, was once a property owned by Buckskin Council. In 2017, a 1,200 acre portion of the camp was bought and donated to The Conservation Fund by the Dominion Conservation Fund (a subsidiary of Dominion Energy). It serves as a replacement for a portion of Seneca State Forest, that will be used for a natural gas transport line. The portion sold consisted of approximately 1200 acres located on the west side of state route 28 all the way to the Greenbrier River, but had no buildings or camp facilities located on it. In 2022, the remaining portion of the camp was sold for $1.7 million according to records on file at the Pocahontas County courthouse.

Originating from Chief Cornstalk council, Camp Chief Cornstalk was purchased by the Logan County Commission in 2023.

In 2023, Buckskin Council also sold Camp Roland in Bland County, VA.

Camp Kootaga (in Walker, WV) was previously owned and operated by Buckskin Council after the acquisition of the Kootaga District in 2019. In August, 2025, Buckskin Council sold Camp Kootaga to a nonprofit organization, the Camp Kootaga Foundation. The camp remains available for use by scout units, families, youth organizations, and businesses.

== See also ==
- Scouting in West Virginia
