= Lone Star Area Council =

Lone Star Area Council may be:

- Lone Star Area Council (#569) now the Circle Ten Council
- Lone Star Area Council (#580) now the NeTseO Trails Council
