= Red River Valley Council =

Red River Valley Council may be:

- Red River Valley Council (North Dakota)
- Red River Valley Council (Texas)
- Red River Area Council (Oklahoma)
