= Cherokee Area Council =

The Boy Scouts of America has two councils named Cherokee Area Council:

- Cherokee Area Council (Oklahoma)
- Cherokee Area Council (Tennessee)
