= Shawnee Council =

Shawnee Council may be:

- Shawnee Council (Ohio)
- Shawnee Council (Oklahoma)
