= Scouting in Texas =

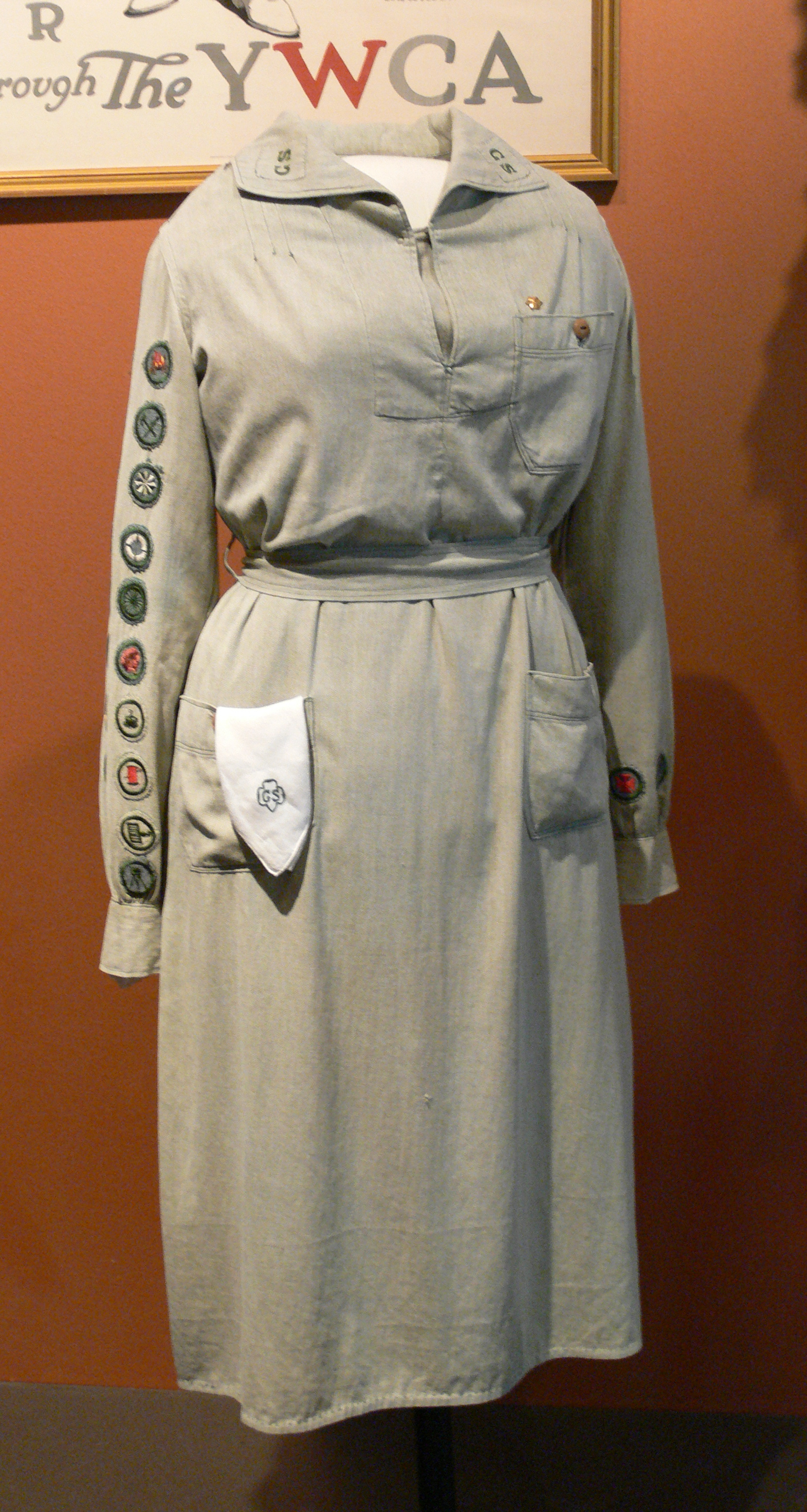
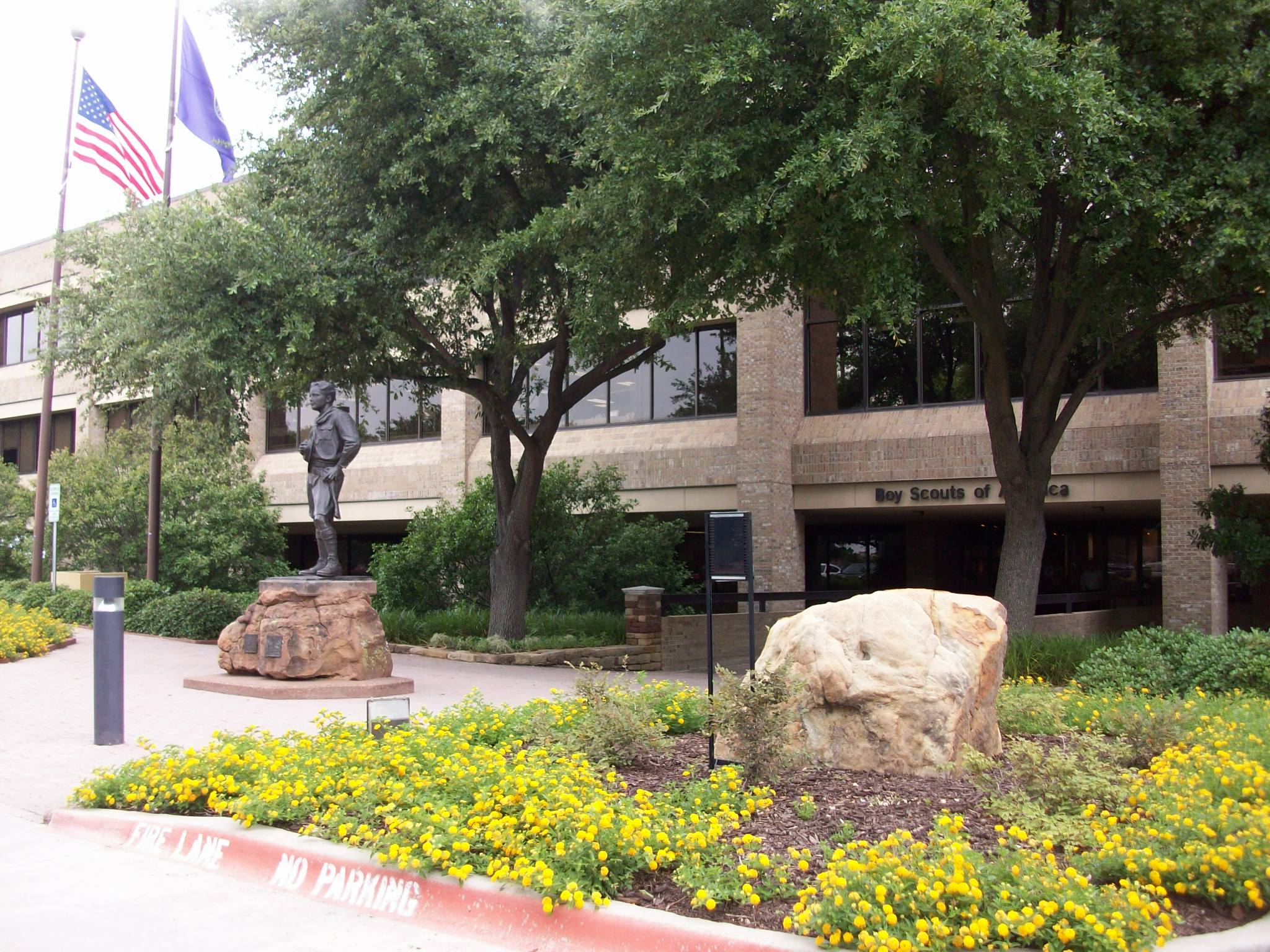
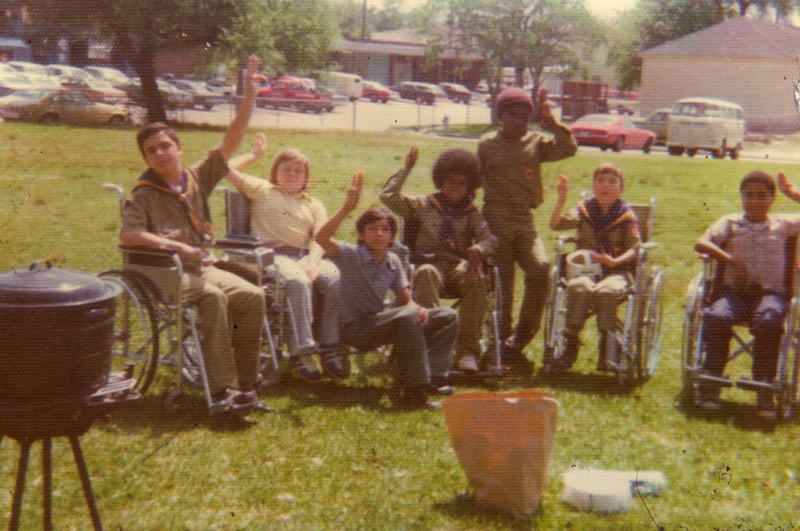
- Comanche Trail Council Indian Camp at the 1937 National Scout Jamboree Girl Scout uniform, 1927 at The Women's Museum Boy Scouts of America National Headquarters Boy Scout Cookout

Scouting in Texas has a long history, from the 1910s to the present day, serving thousands of youth in programs that suit the environment in which they live. Scouting, also known as the Scout Movement, is a worldwide youth movement with the stated aim of supporting young people in their physical, mental and spiritual development, so that they may play constructive roles in society.

Girl Scouts of the USA, organized into eight local councils, serving girls - with a focus on courage, character & confidence.

Scouting America provides Scouting for boys and girls in all programs. Texas is home to the BSA national headquarters, in Irving, Texas. The Boy Scouts of America in Texas are organized into 20 local councils.

== History ==
Scouting in Texas unofficially dates to the publication of British lieutenant general Robert Baden-Powell's popular book, Scouting for Boys, in 1908. Even before a national organization had been started, groups of boys began Scout activities in troops and small groups in 1908, 1909, and 1910. The claims of several troops to be the first organized in Texas, whether before or after the incorporation of the Boy Scouts of America on February 8, 1910, are difficult to verify. BSA archives do show that the thirty-seventh registered scoutmaster in the country was a Texan, Rev. George W. Sheafor, of Comanche, in 1910.

In February 1910, just days after the Boy Scouts of America was organized, Boy Scout Troop 114 was established in Floresville, Texas by Professor W.H. Butler. A reference to the Floresville Boy Scout Troop can be found in the edition of April 2, 1911 of The Galveston Daily News when they published a picture of the Floresville troop. An article in the Victoria, Weekly Advocate (probably January 10, 1911 edition) refers to the Floresville Boy Scout troop as the second oldest in Texas. A short break in the troop's charter occurred in 1974. They no longer appear to be an active Troop.

Austin, TX Troop 5 was formed in 1911 and has been in continuous operation since that time. In 2011, Austin Troop 5 celebrated its 100th anniversary centennial at Camp Mabry. Troop 5 is believed to be the oldest continuously chartered scout troop in Texas.

In 1913 Troop 7 was established in Grapevine, Texas. The troop has been chartered every year since starting except 1979.

In 1916 Troop 1 was established in Wichita Falls, Texas. Troop 1 in Wichita Falls has been continuously chartered since 1916.

In 1918 Troop 65 was established in Denton, Texas. Troop 65 has been continuously chartered since 1918.

In 1925 Troop 30 was established in Houston, Texas. The troop has been continuously chartered since 1925.

An African American troop was formed in Port Arthur as early as 1916. The BSA report to Congress for 1930 named Dallas as one of the southern cities in which Scouting was growing in the black community. Hispanic boys were also active in Scouting, often in units with non-Hispanic boys. Jewish youth had been active in Scouting in San Antonio for many years before a synagogue sponsored a troop for them in 1924.

By 1918, unofficial Wolf Cub packs appeared in Paris, Texas.

The BSA national office was moved to Irving in 1979.

The Girl Scouts of San Jacinto Council traces its roots back to the 1920s when Frances Mann Law and Corrinne Fonde organized a Girl Scout Council in Houston. The council office was in a three roomed cottage.

Most Girl Scouts of the USA units were originally segregated by race according to state and local laws and customs. The first troop for Mexican Americans was formed in Houston in 1922. In 1936, the first African American Girl Scout troop west of the Mississippi was formed in Texas.

The Girl Scouts' Camp Texlake was dedicated in 1949.

Early history (1910–1950)
In 1912, the Alamo Council formed (#583), changing its name in 1918 to the San Antonio Council (#583). In 1925, the council changed its name to the Alamo Area Council (#583).

In 1912, the Austin Council (#564) was founded and changed its name to the Austin-Travis County Council (#564) in 1924. It changed its name again in 1928 to the Austin Area Council. In 1934, the council changed its name to the Capitol Area Council (#564).

In 1913, the Houston Council (#576) formed, changing its name in 1923 to Harris County Council (#574). It changed to Houston Area Council (#576) in 1927, changing again to Sam Houston Area Council in 1936.

In 1913, the Midland Council was founded and closed in 1914.

In 1913, the Rosenberg Council was founded and closed.

In 1915, the Dallas County Council (#571) was formed as the Dallas Council (#571). It changed its name to the Circle Ten Council (#571) in 1928.

In 1915, the El Paso Council (#573) was formed. In 1924 it changed its name to the El Paso County Council (#573). In 1928, it changed its name again to the El Paso Area Council (#573). EPAC changed its name to the Yucca Council (#573) in 1937

In 1915, the Waco Council was founded and closed in 1919.

In 1917, the Corpus Christi Council was founded and closed in 1923.

In 1918, the Bay City Council was founded and closed in 1920.

In 1918, the Kingsville Council (#575) was founded and closed in 1924.

In 1918, the Paris Council (#580) was formed, changing its name to the Lamar County Council (#580) in 1925. In 1928, the council renamed itself again to the Lone Star Area Council (#580). In 1955, the council became the NeTseO Trails Council.

In 1919, the Beaumont Council (#565) was founded and changed its name to the Beaumont Area Council (#565) in 1934. In 1942 the council changed its name to the Trinity-Neches Council (#565). In 1970, Trinity-Neches merged into the Three Rivers Council (#578) with the Sabine Area Council.

In 1919, the Port Arthur Council (#578) was founded and was merged into Sabine Area Council (#578) in 1929.

In 1919, the Galveston Council (#574) formed, changing its name in 1925 to Galveston County Council (#574). It changed to Bay Area Council (#574).

In 1919, the Nacogdoches Council was founded and closed in 1920.

In 1919, the Texarkana Council (#584) was formed, changing its name to the Texas-Arkansas Council (#584) in 1928. In 1936, the council changed its name to the Caddo Area Council (#584).

In 1920, the Brazos Valley Council (#566) was founded and closed in 1926.

In 1920, the Fort Worth Council (#582) was formed, changing its name to the Tarrant County Council (#582) in 1922. In 1927, the council changed its name to the Fort Worth Area Council (#582), and again to the Longhorn Council in 1949.

In 1920, the Laredo Council was formed, merging into the Webb County Council (#700).

In 1920, the Mount Pleasant Council (#577) was founded and closed in 1924.

In 1920, the Waxahachie Council (#586) was founded and closed in 1927.

In 1920, the Webb County Council (#700) formed. In 1924, the Laredo Council formed, merging into Webb County Council in 1922. In 1925, Webb County Council changed its name to the Aztec Council (#700) in 1927. In 1933, the Aztec Council (#700) merged into Gulf Coast Council.

In 1920, the Wichita Falls Council (#587) was formed, changing its name to the Wichita Area Council (#587) in 1927. It changed its name again in 1937 to the Northwest Texas Council (#587).

In 1921, the Orange County Council (#578) was founded and was merged into Sabine Area Council (#578) in 1929. In 1970, Sabine Area merged into the Three Rivers Council (#578) with the Trinity-Neches Council.

In 1921, the Amarillo Council (#562) was founded and changed its name to Panhandle Area Council in 1924. In 1928, it changed its name to Amarillo Area Council. In 1939, the council changed its name to Llano Estacado Council (#562). In 1986 it merged with Adobe Walls to form the Golden Spread Council (#562).

In 1921, the Brownwood Council was founded and closed in 1924.

In 1921, the Cleburne Council was founded and closed in 1921.

In 1921, the Cooke County Council (#570) formed. In 1921, the Denton Council formed, merging with Cooke County to become Mo-Co-Wi-De Council (#572) in 1924. In 1927 to council changed its name to the Cooke and Denton Area Council. It merged into the Fort Worth Area Council (#582) in 1928.

In 1921, the Terrell Council was founded and closed in 1921.

In 1922, the Abilene Council (#561) was founded and changed its name to the Chisholm Trail Council (#568) in 1926. The Chisholm Trail Council merged with the Comanche Trail Council in 2003 to form the Texas Trails Council (#561).

In 1922, the Guadalupe Valley Area Council (#547) was founded and changed its name to Tonqua Area Council in 1924. The Tonqua Area Council folded in 1932.

In 1922, the Tyler Council (#585) was founded and changed its name to Kickapoo Council in 1924. The Kickapoo Council folded in 1926.

In 1922, the Webb County Council (#700) was formed. In 1927, the Webb County Council changed its name to the Aztec Council (#700). In 1933, the council merged into the Alamo Area Council (#583).

In 1922, the Wellington Council (#579) was founded and closed in 1924.

In 1923, the Buffalo Trail Council (#567) was founded.

In 1923, the Collin County Council (#569) was formed, splitting between the Lone Star Area Council (#580) and the Circle Ten Council in 1927.

In 1924 the Arrowhead formed. In 1928 half of the council merged into the Alamo Area Council (#583).

In 1924, the Arrowhead Council (#563) was founded and merged into the Austin Area Council (#564) in 1928.

In 1924, the Falls-Milam-Robertson Area Council (#673) formed, merging into Harris County Council and McLennan County Council in 1926.

In 1924, the Grayson County Council (#568) was founded, changing its name to the T-O Council (#568) in 1930. It dissolved in 1936.

In 1924, the McLennan County Council (#662) was formed, changing its name to the Heart O' Texas Council (#662) in 1929.

In 1924, the Navarro County Council (#676) was formed. It merged into the Circle Ten Council (#571) in 1927.

In 1924, the Red River Valley Council (#563) was formed. It merged into the Circle Ten Council (#571) in 1947.

In 1925, the Limestone County Council (#698) was formed, changing its name to the Limestone & Freestone Area Council (#698) in 1929, and merging into the Davy Crockett Council (#586) in 1930.

In 1925, the South Plains Council (#694) was formed.

In 1925, the Tr-An-Le-Ho Council (#586) was formed, merging into the Davy Crockett Council (#586) in 1930.

In 1926, the Concho Valley Council (#741) was founded.

In 1926, the Central Plains Council (#482) was formed, merging into the South Plains Council (#694) in 1929.

In 1926, the Southwest Texas Council (#745) was formed, merging into the Concho Valley Council (#741) in 1929.

In 1927, the Brownwood Council (#479) was founded and changed its name to Pecan Valley Council in 1928. In 1932, Pecan Valley merged into the Comanche Trail Council (#479) in 1932.

In 1927, the Eastland County Council (#774) was founded and changed its name to Oil Belt Council in 1929. In 1932, Oil Belt merged into the Comanche Trail Council (#479).

In 1927, the Lone Star Area Council (#569) was formed. It merged into the Circle Ten Council (#571) in 1928.

In 1927, the Lone Star Area Council (#569) was founded and merged into the Grayson County Council (#568) in 1928.

In 1927, the Rio Grande Council (#775) was formed as the Lower Rio Grande Valley Council (#775). It changed its name in 1947 to the current name.

In 1928, the Adobe Walls Council (#569) was founded and changed its name to Adobe Walls Area Council in 1934. In 1986 it merged with lano Estacado Council to form the Golden Spread Council (#562).

In 1928, the Pine Tree Area Council (#585) was formed, merging into the East Texas Area Council (#586) in 1931.

In 1928, the Quanah Parker Council (#559) was formed. In 1931 one half of the council merged into the Wichita Falls Council (#587).

In 1928, the Tejas Council (#472) was formed, merging into the East Texas Area Council (#586) in 1931.

In 1928, the Tex-Okla Council (#489) was founded and merged into the Adobe Walls Council (#569) in 1931. In 1928, the Southeast Panhandle Council (#563) was founded and merged into the Adobe Walls Council (#569) in 1931.

In 1929, the Gulf Coast Council (#577) formed. In 1924, the Nueces Valley Council formed, merging into Gulf Coast Council in 1929.

In 1929, the Lone Star Council (#580) was founded and closed in 1954.

In 1930, the Davy Crockett Council (#586) was formed, merging into the East Texas Area Council (#586) in 1930.

In 1933, the Sherman Council (#569) was formed. It changed its name to the Sherman Area Council (#566) in 1941. In 1966, the council changed its name again to the Texoma Valley Council (#566). It merged into the Circle Ten Council (#571) in 1947.

== Scouting America in Texas ==
Boy Scouts of America in Texas
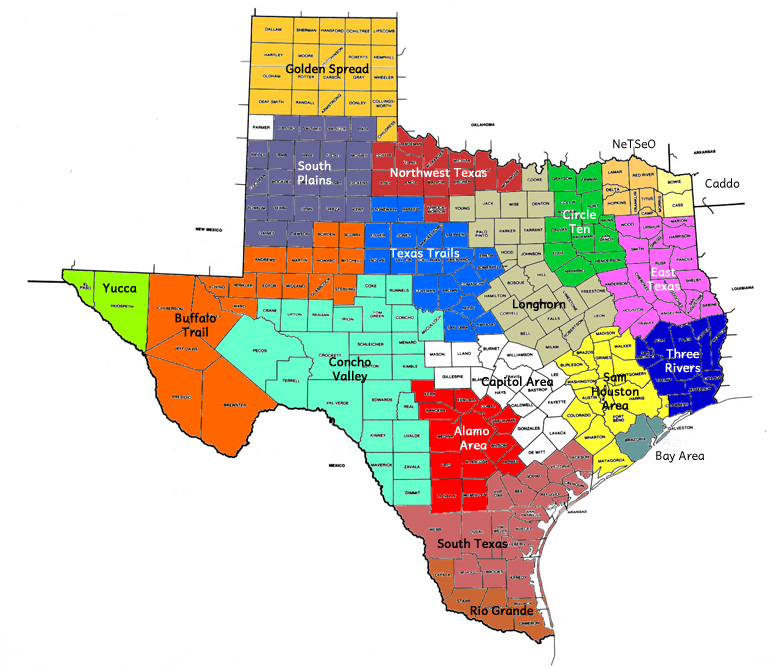
- Map of approximate council boundaries
- Owner: Boy Scouts of America

Texas is home to the Scouting America National Headquarters in Irving, Texas. The National Scouting Museum was located in Irving from October 2002 until September 2017 when it was moved to Philmont Scout Ranch in Cimarron, New Mexico.

There are twenty Scouting America local councils in Texas. All of Texas lies within the Southern Region, except for El Paso, Hudspeth and Parmer Counties, which are part of Western Region.

=== Alamo Area Council ===
Alamo Area Council (#583)
- Owner: Scouting America
- Headquarters: San Antonio, Texas
- Country: United States
- President: Jim Montgomery
- Council Commissioner: Patrick Walther
- Scout Executive: Ryan M Harris
- Website www.alamoareabsa.org

The Alamo Area Council, headquartered in San Antonio, Texas, serves a 13 county area in Texas. The counties served by the Council include Bexar, Atascosa, Bandera, Comal, Frio, Guadalupe, Karnes, Kendall, Kerr, La Salle, McMullen, Medina, and Wilson.

==== Organization ====
Structure

Instead of districts led by district executives (professional staff) and volunteer district commissioners, the council's structure unites all its members and functions as a single district. Professional staff offer support in specific areas of membership, engagement, and retention to commissioners and unit leadership.

==== Camps ====
Alamo Area Council operates three camps: McGimsey Scout Park, where Cub Scout Day Camp is held during the summer, as well as other events throughout the year, Bear Creek Scout CCamp, where Scout resident camp and Webelos resident camp are held during the summer. Mays Family Scout Ranch located south of downtown San Antonio.

==== Order of the Arrow ====
- Aina Topa Hutsi #60

=== Bay Area Council ===
Bay Area Council (#574)
- Owner: Scouting America
- Headquarters: Galveston, Texas
- Country: United States
- Website www.bacbsa.org

==== Organization ====
- Coastal District
- Cradle of Texas District
- Thunderbird District
- Northern Star District

==== Camps ====
- Camp Karankawa
- Sea Star Base Galveston

==== Order of the Arrow ====
- Wihinipa Hinsa Lodge

=== Buffalo Trail Council ===
Buffalo Trail Council (#567)
- Owner: Boy Scouts of America
- Headquarters: Midland, Texas
- Country: United States
- Website www.buffalotrailbsa.org

The Buffalo Trail Council comprises five Districts serving West Texas.

==== Organization ====
- Chaparral District - Martin and Midland counties
- Comanche Trails District - Andrews, Ector, Loving, Ward, and Winkler counties
- Big Bend District - Brewster, Culberson, Jeff Davis, Presidio, and Reeves counties
- Lone Star District - Borden, Glasscock, Howard, Mitchell, Scurry and Sterling counties
- Scoutreach District

==== Camps ====
- Buffalo Trail Scout Ranch

=== Caddo Area Council ===
Headquartered in Texarkana, Texas, the Caddo Area Council (#584) serves Scouts in Northeast Texas and Arkansas.

The Longhorn District serves Bowie and Cass counties in Northeast Texas.

=== Capitol Area Council ===
Capitol Area Council (#564)
- Owner: Scouting America
- Headquarters: 12500 North I-35; Austin, Texas 78753
- Location: Texas
- Country: United States
- Founded: 1912
- Membership: 24,000 youth
- President: Marietta Scott
- Council Commissioner: Mani Kuruvila
- Scout Executive: Jon Yates
- Website www.bsacac.org

The Capitol Area Council serves Scouts and Scouting volunteers in 15 Central Texas counties surrounding Austin. The council currently (when?) serves 24,000 young people, and is led by the current Scout Executive, Jon Yates.

==== Organization ====
- Armadillo District
- Bee Cave District
- Blackland Prairie District
- Chisholm Trail District
- Colorado River District
- Hill Country District
- Live Oak District
- North Shore District
- Sacred Springs District
- San Gabriel District
- Thunderbird District
- Waterloo District

==== Camps ====
- Lost Pines Scout Reservation - Bastrop County, Texas
- Griffith League Scout Ranch - Bastrop County, Texas
- Camp Alma McHenry - near Giddings, Texas
- Camp Green Dickson - near Gonzales, Texas
- Smilin V -- Liberty Hill (Williamson County), Texas
- Roy D. Rivers Wilderness Camp - Near Smithville, Texas

==== Order of the Arrow ====
- Tonkawa #99

First chartered by the National Council on January 20, 1937, by Joe Lindsay Jr. and Joe Lindsay Sr., Tonkawa Lodge #99 started as Tejas Lodge but was later changed to Tonkawa in 1938 with lodge 72 already having the name. Tonkawa Lodge #99 was proudly had one of its members become the Order of the Arrow National Chief in 2011, Jonathan "Bunker" Hillis. Currently Tonkawa Lodge #99 has 12 Chapters that are aligned and named with the above-mentioned Districts.

=== Circle Ten Council ===
Circle Ten Council (#571)
- Owner: Scouting America
- Headquarters: Dallas, Texas
- Country: United States
- Founded: 1913
- Website circleten.org

The Circle Ten Council serves BSA units in 24 counties across North Texas and portions of Oklahoma.

==== Organization ====
North Central Service Area

- Northern Trail District
- Rising Sun District
- Tejas Caddo District
- West Park District

North Metro Service Area

- Chisholm Trail District
- Eagle Trail District
- Iron Horse District
- Lone Star District
- Texoma Valley District

Northeastern Service Area

- Duck Creek District
- East Trinity Trails District
- Eastern Lakes District
- Post Oak District
- Two Rivers District

Southwestern Service Area

- Elm Fork District
- Soaring Eagle District
- Southern Star District
- Western Horizion District

==== Camps ====
- Camp Constantin - Graford, TX
- Clements Scout Ranch - Athens, TX
- Camp James Ray - Pottsboro, TX
- Camp Wisdom - Dallas, TX

==== Order of the Arrow ====
- Mikanakawa Lodge #101

=== Conquistador Council ===
The Conquistador Council (No. 413), with its office in Roswell, New Mexico, primarily oversees BSA units in southeast New Mexico. However, Parmer County, Texas is included in the council territory because of its proximity to Clovis, New Mexico. There are no units chartered in Parmer County. The area is part of El Llano Grande District. The Kwahadi Lodge #78 of the Order of the Arrow serves local Arrowmen.

=== East Texas Area Council ===
East Texas Area Council (#585)
- Owner: Scouting America
- Headquarters: Tyler, Texas
- Country: United States
- Founded: 1930
- Website www.etexscouts.org

The East Texas Area Council was formed in 1930 through the merger of the Davey Crockett Council, the Pine Tree Area Council, and the Tejas Council. It serves 17 counties in Texas.

==== Organization ====
- Five Rivers District
- Golden Eagle District
- Tomahawk District
- Wo Ha Li District

==== Camps ====
- George W. Pirtle Scout Reservation (Camp Pirtle)

==== Order of the Arrow ====
- Tejas Lodge 72

=== Golden Spread Council ===
Golden Spread Council (#562)
- Owner: Scouting America
- Headquarters: Amarillo, Texas
- Country: United States
- Founded: 1987
- Defunct: 2026
- Website goldenspread.org

The Golden Spread Council (#562) served Scouts in the Panhandles of Texas and Oklahoma. Its service area included all or part of 23 counties in Texas and three counties in Oklahoma. The council merged with South Plains Council on June 1, 2026, becoming the Prairie Sky Council.

Organization

- Adobe Walls District
- Golden Eagle District
- Lone Wolf District
- Quanah Parker District

Camps

- Camp Don Harrington
- Camp M.K. Brown

Order of the Arrow

- Nischa Achowalogen

=== High Desert Council ===
Based in Albuquerque, New Mexico, the High Desert Council primarily serves most of the state of New Mexico, but also serves a portion of southwestern Colorado and El Paso and Hudspeth counties in Texas. The council formed in 2025 following the merger of the Great Southwest and Yucca councils.

=== Longhorn Council ===
Longhorn Council (#662)
- Owner: Scouting America
- Headquarters: Hurst, Texas
- Country: United States
- Scout Executive: Wendy Shaw
- Website www.longhorncouncil.org

The Longhorn Council serves Scouts in a 23 county area of North Texas and Central Texas. Its headquarters is in Hurst (near Fort Worth), with an additional service center in Waco.

==== Organization ====
The council is organized into 12 districts:

- Arrowhead District
- "Brazos Valley District".
- "Chisholm Trail District".
- "Frontier Trails District".
- Heart O' Texas District
- "Leon Valley District".
- Lone Star District
- "Mustang District".
- Orion District
- Pathfinder District
- Santa Fe District
- "Trinity Trails District".

==== Camps ====
- Worth Ranch (Palo Pinto, Texas)
- Sid Richardson Scout Ranch (Bridgeport, Texas)
- Camp Tahuaya (Belton, Texas)
- Hills and Hollows (Denton, Texas)

==== Order of the Arrow ====
- Netopalis Sipo Schipinahck Lodge #209

=== NeTseO Trails Council ===
NeTseO Trails Council (#580)
- Owner: Scouting America
- Headquarters: Paris, Texas
- Country: United States
- Defunct: 2017
- Website none - merged with Circle Ten Council

NeTseO Trails Council served Scouts in northeastern Texas (neT) and southeastern Oklahoma (seO) and had the Council Office in Paris, Texas on the west side of Loop 286. The council merged with Circle Ten March 1, 2017.

==== Organization ====
- Two Rivers District
- Northern Star District
- White Oak District

==== Camps ====
- Camp Frederick H. Dierks, Wright City, Oklahoma (sold 2017)
- Lynwood Hogue Scout Camp a.k.a. "Hogue's Landing", Paris, TX

==== Order of the Arrow ====
- Loquanne Allangwh Lodge #428

=== Northwest Texas Council ===
Northwest Texas Council (#587)
- Owner: Scouting America
- Headquarters: Wichita Falls, Texas
- Country: United States
- Founded: 1920
- Scout Executive/CEO: Greg Brownfield
- Website www.nwtcbsa.org

The Northwest Texas Council (#587) was founded in 1920. Based in Wichita Falls, the Northwest Texas Council serves almost 100 units in 12 Texas counties (Archer, Baylor, Clay, Cottle, Foard, Hardeman, King, Knox, Montague, Throckmorton, Wichita, and Wilbarger).

Organization

The Northwest Texas Council has two districts:

- Green Belt District
- Red River District

==== Camps ====
- Camp Perkins - a gift in 1941 from Mr. & Mrs. J. J. Perkins, is the primary camp for the council. It is about 400 acres (160 ha) located along the Red River.

==== Order of the Arrow ====
- Wichita Lodge 35

=== Rio Grande Council ===
Rio Grande Council (#775)
- Owner: Scouting America
- Headquarters: Harlingen, Texas
- Country: United States
- Founded: 1926
- President: Dr. Jake Margo
- Council Commissioner: Paty Garcia
- Scout Executive: Luis Rodriguez
- Website www.riograndecouncil.org

The Rio Grande Council (#775) was formed in 1927 as the Lower Rio Grande Valley Council (#775). It changed its name in 1947 to the current name. It covers 5 counties, including Cameron, Hidalgo, Willacy, Starr & Zapata and it serves a membership of approximately, 4,000 youth and 1,500 adult leaders in the southernmost parts of Texas.

==== Organization ====
The Rio Grande Council has two districts:

- East
- West

==== Camps ====
- Laguna Station High Adventure Sea Base is located on South Padre Island. Campers can gain SCUBA certification.
- Camp Perry was established in 1927 and has continuously operated as a Boy Scout Camp longer than any other such camp in Texas. Situated on the banks of the Arroyo Colorado, it covers over 260 acres (1.1 km^{2}). There are twelve campsites at Camp Perry.

==== Order of the Arrow ====
- Wewanoma Lodge

=== Sam Houston Area Council ===
Sam Houston Area Council (#576)
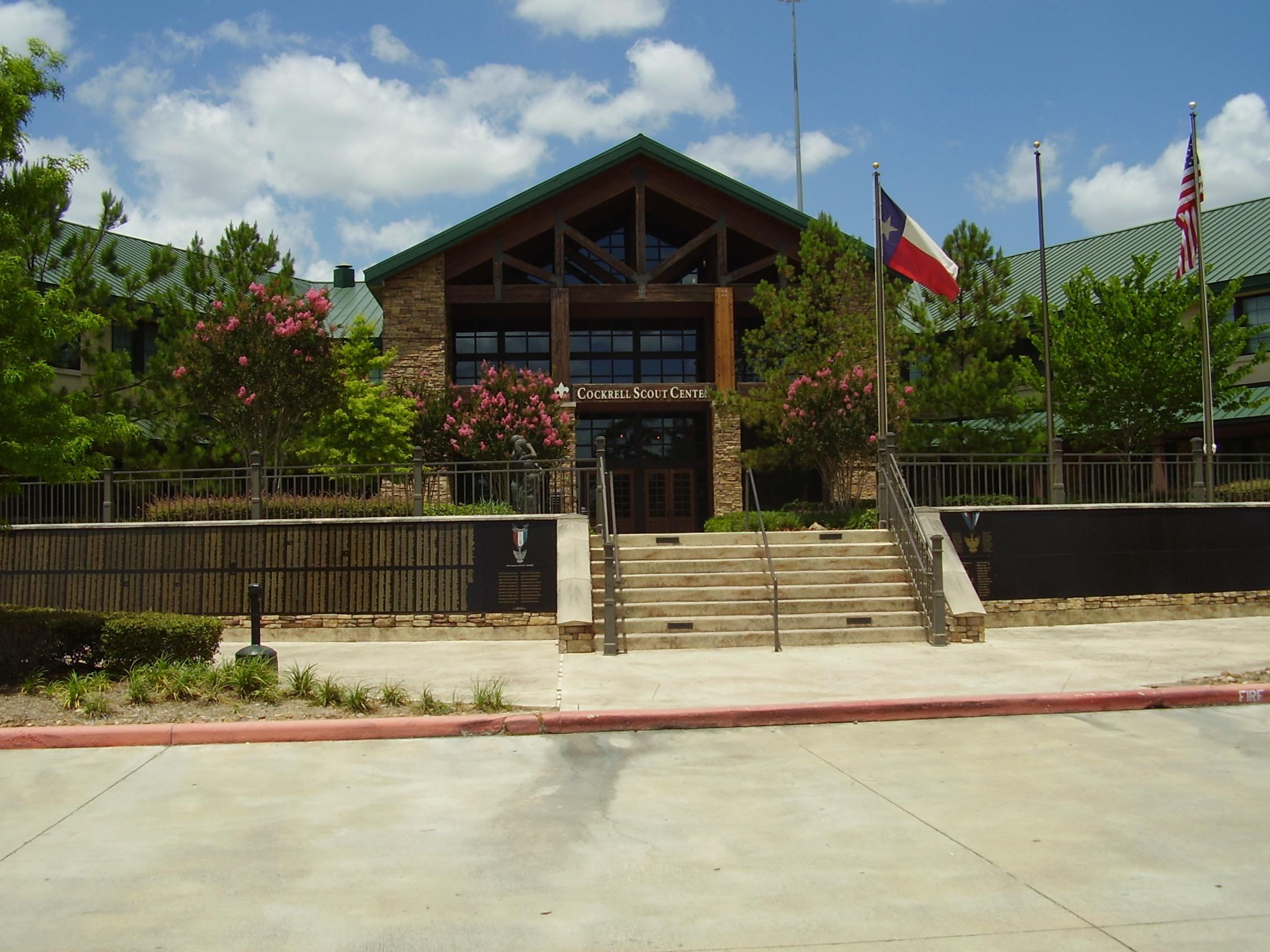
- Owner: Scouting America
- Headquarters: Houston, Texas
- Location: 2225 N Loop W, Houston, Texas 77008-1311
- Country: United States
- Founded: 1914
- Scout Executive / CEO: Marvin Smith
- Chief Operating Officer: Thomas Franklin
- Chief Development Officer: Travis Briner
- Website www.samhoustonbsa.org

The Sam Houston Area Council serves youth in 16 counties in southeast Texas. The council headquarters is in Houston.

==== Organization ====
Central Division

- Aldine Pathfinder District
- Tatanka District
- Antares District
- W.L. Davis District

East Division

- San Jacinto District
- Flaming Arrow District
- Raven District
- Skyline District

Frontier Division

- Arrowmoon District
- Brahman District
- David Crockett District
- George Strake District

North Division

- Iron Horse District
- Phoenix District
- Soaring Eagle District
- Tall Timbers District
- Orion District

South Division

- Aquila District
- Brazos District
- North Star District
- Thunder Wolf District
- Twin Bayou District

West Division

- Copperhead District
- Big Cypress District
- Mustang District
- Texas Skies District

Learning for Life Division

- Exploring - North District
- Exploring - South District
- Learning for Life - Curriculum
- STEM Scouts

==== Camps ====
- Camp Strake was a Boy Scout Camp in Southern Montgomery County, Texas off of I-45. The camp closed in December 2014. Camp Strake is moving to a rural site in the Sam Houston National Forest, between New Waverly and Coldspring near the community of Evergreen in order to create a 21st-century Scouting experience for Scouts and their leaders.
- (Sold in 2016) El Rancho Cima Scout Reservation, a 2,680 acre mountain ranch purchased in 1953. It is located on the Blanco River near Wimberley, Texas in the Devil's Backbone of the Texas Hill Country. El Rancho Cima contains three main areas. -
  - Due to devastating flooding at El Rancho Cima's River Camp on Memorial Day 2015, El Rancho Cima was closed as a scout camp. Hays County purchased a portion of the land from SHAC in November 2019.
- Camp Brosig is located seven miles north of Sealy, Texas. This camp is used primarily for weekend camping at district/council activities.
- Bovay Scout Ranch is located off SH 6, just south of Navasota, Texas. Bovay Scout Ranch contains the McNair Cub Adventure Camp and the Tellepsen Scout Camp.

==== OA Lodges ====
- Colonneh Lodge #137
- 2026 Lodge Chief: Wren Havens - first female lodge chief for Sam Houston Area Council

==== International exchanges ====
Houston Scouts have an international relationship with Scouts in Chiba, Japan.

=== South Plains Council ===
The South Plains Council (#694) served the area around Lubbock. The council merged with the Golden Spread Council in 2026 to form the Prairie Sky Council.

=== South Texas Council ===
South Texas Council (#577)
- Owner: Scouting America
- Headquarters: Corpus Christi, Texas
- Country: United States
- Website www.southtexasbsa.org

The South Texas Council of Corpus Christi, Texas, was renamed from the Gulf Coast Council in 2003.

==== Organization ====
- Aztec District
- Brush Country District
- Coastal Plains District
- LaSalle District
- Pawnee District
- Venado District

==== Camps ====
- Camp Karankawa
- Camp Huisache

==== Order of the Arrow ====
- Karankawa Lodge 307

=== Texas Southwest Council ===
Texas Southwest Council (#741)
- Owner: Scouting America
- Headquarters: San Angelo, Texas
- Country: United States
- Scout Executive: Devin Koehler
- Website tswcbsa.org

The Texas Southwest Council serves Scouts in Southwest Central Texas through the jurisdiction of two districts and 26 Boy Scout troops.

==== Organization ====
- Concho Valley District
- Amistad District

==== Camps ====
- Camp Sol Mayer
- Camp Fawcett
- Baden Powell Park

==== Order of the Arrow ====
- Wahinkto Lodge 199

2025 Lodge Chief-Santiago Guerra

=== Texas Trails Council ===
Texas Trails Council (#561)
- Owner: Scouting America
- Headquarters: Abilene, Texas
- Country: United States
- Founded: 2003
- Scout Executive: Gwangi Shipp
- Website www.texastrailsbsa.com

The Texas Trails Council was formed in 2003 by the consolidation of the Chisholm Trail Council (all of Taylor, Shackelford, Haskell, Jones, Callahan, and Coleman counties, and part of Runnels County) and the Comanche Trail Council (Brown, Comanche, Erath, Mills, San Saba, and Lampasas counties).

==== Organization ====
- Old Comanche Trails District (Stephens, Erath, Eastland, and Comanche counties, along with Moran ISD and Cross Plains ISD)
- Pecan Valley District (Lampasas, San Saba, Brown, Mills, and Coleman counties)
- Buffalo Mountain District (Stonewall, Fisher, Haskell, Jones, Nolan, and Taylor counties, along with Albany ISD, Baird ISD, Clyde ISD, and Winters ISD)

==== Camps ====
- Camp Billy Gibbons
- Camp Tonkawa

==== Order of the Arrow ====
- Penateka Lodge

=== Three Rivers Council ===
Three Rivers Council (#578)
- Owner: Scouting America
- Headquarters: Beaumont, Texas
- Country: United States
- Website www.3riversbsa.org

==== Organization ====
- Big Thicket District
- Sabine District
- Spindletop District
- Trinity District

==== Camps ====
Scott Scout Ranch formerly Camp Urland

- Camp Urland Scout Reservation

==== Order of the Arrow ====
- Hasinai Lodge

Neche Lodge 36, Second Oldest in the South until 1970 when the merger of Trinity Neches and Sabine Area required a combine lodge name change to Hasinai.

== Girl Scouts of the USA in Texas ==
Girl Scouting in Texas
- Map of Girl Scout Councils in Texas

There are 8 Girl Scout councils in Texas.

=== Girl Scouts of Central Texas ===
Girl Scouts of Central Texas
- Headquarters: Austin, TX
- Country: United States
- Website www.gsctx.org

Girl Scouts of Central Texas (GSCTX) serves 46 counties and includes the former councils of: Girl Scouts — Bluebonnet Council, Girl Scouts — El Camino Council, Girl Scouts — Heart of Texas Council, Girl Scouts — Lone Star Council. In 2017, the Girl Scouts of Central Texas served 17,000 girls, ages 5–17 years, and over 12,000 adult volunteers in 46 counties. The council runs two residential camps: Camp Texlake and Camp Kachina.

==== Camps ====
Camp Texlake comprises 455 acres (1.84 km^{2}) on Lake Travis. It was assigned to the former Girl Scouts — Lone Star Council by the Lower Colorado River Authority, and was dedicated on July 17, 1949. That summer nearly 400 girls attended camp. The dining facility overlooks Lake Travis itself. The council houses ten horses at this site as well as encouraging watersports. The camp can accommodate 335 overnight guests in a variety of situations.

Camp Kachina is on the shores of Lake Belton. It covers a total of 244 acres (0.99 km^{2}). Activities include archery, sailing, and water sports.

Program areas include STEM, Financial Literacy, Bullying Prevention, Outdoors, Travel, and many special interest troops such as Outdoor Adventure, Robotics, Harp Ensemble, and Mariners.

=== Girl Scouts of the Desert Southwest – Southern New Mexico & West Texas ===
Girl Scouts of the Desert Southwest – Southern New Mexico & West Texas
- Headquarters: El Paso, Texas
- Country: United States
- Website www.gsdsw.org

Girl Scouts of the Desert Southwest brings together Girl Scouts of the Permian Basin, Girl Scouts of the Rio Grande and Girl Scouts - Zia Council. The merger on May 1, 2009, is part of the realignment of Girl Scout councils nationwide.(see Scouting in New Mexico).

==== Organization ====
Service Centers: Midland, TX; Odessa, TX; Alamogordo, NM; Artesia, NM; Carlsbad, NM; Deming, NM; Hobbs, NM; Las Cruces, NM; Roswell, NM; Silver City, NM;

==== Camps ====
Camp Mitre Peak is located in the Davis Mountains between Alpine and Fort Davis. There are three cabins, known as Kickapoo, Apache, and Seminole, located in Fern Canyon. There are also three tent units: Mescalero, Tonkawa, and Chippewa. These have views of Mitre Peak. The Janice Hill Mathews Amphitheater seats over 200 people and campfires are held here. The Pamela Catherine Haas Horseback Riding Arena, nicknamed Rebel Arena, gives girls the opportunity to participate in western riding and trail riding programs. The Laura Van Pelt Complex supports indoor activities. The complex consists of a pavilion and an educational building. The latter includes a kitchen and a darkroom. Alumni and supporters of the camp can join Troop Mitre.

Camps:

- Camp Pioneer in Sunland Park, NM
- Camp Mitre Peak in Fort Davis, TX

=== Girl Scouts - Diamonds of Arkansas, Oklahoma and Texas ===
Headquarters: North Little Rock, Arkansas

=== Girl Scouts of Greater South Texas ===
Girl Scouts of Greater South Texas
- Headquarters: Harlingen, Texas
- Country: United States
- Website www.gsgst.org

Formed by the merger of Girl Scouts Paisano Council and Girl Scouts — Tip of Texas Council in 2007.

==== Organization ====
Council Offices:

- Corpus Christi, TX
- McAllen, TX

Program Centers:

- Laredo, TX
- Victoria, TX

==== Camps ====
- Camp Bayview is 18 acres (73,000 m^{2}) near Bayview, TX along the Resaca de los Cuates. There are cabins and bungalows to accommodate campers. There is a swimming pool, amphitheater and a covered pavilion.
- Camp Green Hill is spread over almost 50 acres (200,000 m^{2}) and is located near Mathis, TX on Lake Corpus Christi. The site is mostly wooded. Small craft can be launched from the waterfront.

=== Girl Scouts of Northeast Texas ===
Girl Scouts of Northeast Texas
- Headquarters: Dallas, Texas
- Country: United States
- Website www.gsnetx.org

The Dallas Girl Scouts were established in December 1920 through the joint efforts of Mr. Elmer Scott and members of the Business and Professional Women's Club. In 1963, the Dallas Girl Scouts merged with the Chisholm Trail Girl Scout Council and began serving 11 counties as the Tejas Girl Scout Council. In 2007, Girl Scouts of Northeast Texas was born through the merger of Cross Timbers, Red River Valley, and Tejas Councils.

Girl Scouts of Northeast Texas serves 19,000 girls and 8,000 adults in 32 northeast Texas counties.

==== Council ====
Spanning 23,000 square miles, Girl Scouts of Northeast Texas serves 19,000 girls and 8,000 adults in 32 northeast Texas counties: Anderson, Camp, Cherokee, Collin, Dallas, Delta, Denton, Ellis, Fannin, Franklin, Freestone, Grayson, Gregg, Harrison, Henderson, Hopkins, Hunt, Kaufman, Lamar, Marion, Morris, Navarro, Panola, Rains, Red River, Rockwall, Rusk, Smith, Titus, Upshur, Van Zandt and Wood.

==== Offices and Locations ====
There are a total of 5 locations: Jo Ann Fogg (Headquarters), Denton County Girl Scout DreamLab, Southern Dallas Girl Scout DreamLab (coming in 2026,) Girl Scouts Tyler Office.

==== Camps ====
- Camp Bette Perot - A resident summer camp near Palestine, Texas, known for its equestrian program.
- Camp Whispering Cedars - 20 minutes from downtown Dallas
- Camp Gambill - 54 acres (220,000 m^{2}) near Paris, Texas. Initial bit donated in 1947 by John C. Gambill
- Camp Kadohadacho - on Lake Texoma

=== Girl Scouts of San Jacinto Council ===
Girl Scouts of San Jacinto Council
- Headquarters: Houston, Texas
- Country: United States
- Website www.gssjc.org

Girl Scouts of San Jacinto Council was founded by Mrs. F. M. Law and Miss Corinne Fonde in 1922 in Houston.

Girl Scouts of San Jacinto Council serves 26 counties in Southeast Texas, including Angelina, Brazoria, Chambers, Fort Bend, Galveston, Hardin, Harris, Houston, Jasper, Jefferson, Liberty, Matagorda, Montgomery, Nacogdoches, Newton, Orange, Polk, Sabine, San Augustine, San Jacinto, Shelby, Trinity, Tyler, Walker, Waller, and Wharton.

==== Program Place and Goodykoontz Museum of Girl Scout History ====
The Program Place and Goodykoontz Museum of Girl Scout History opened in 2007. It is situated next to the headquarters building and is intended to function in harmony with the headquarters on the shared site. The Program Place includes a library, theater, Girl Scout shop, stage, café and a lounge for older girls, as well as a park with fire pit. The Goodykoontz Museum of Girl Scout History, in the same building, features a timeline from the start of the council in the 1920s until the present, and interactive displays. The building acquisition and renovation cost $5.6 million. The entrance canopy of the Program Place was designed and built by University of Houston graduate architecture students. The pavilion was represents a Girl Scout sash.

==== Camps ====
There are ten camps run by the council. Three of these form the Treelake Complex, a series of connected camps. Trails allow Girl Scouts to hike from Camp Misty Meadows to Camp Silver Springs via Camp Agnes Arnold.

Camp Agnes Arnold is a 479-acre (1.94 km^{2}) camp near Conroe. Campers can be accommodated in tents, yurts, tree houses or cabin units. The camp offers canoeing and fishing on Shadow Lake. A nature trail encircles the lake. In total, there are 7 miles (11 km) of hiking and cycling trails on the site. The Ann Temple Allen Lodge is air-conditioned. The Nature Center was opened on 2008-04-12. The center has over 4,000 square feet (370 m^{2}) of space and includes a workroom, classroom and exhibit hall, as well as overnight accommodations for two naturalists. A glass wall makes an indoor observation deck. There is also a pillared observation deck. Wood from around the site was used to build the center. The council received the 2008 Excellence in Wood Design Award from the Texas Forestry Association (TFA) for the Nature Center. In total, there are 7 miles (11 km) of hiking and cycling trails on the site. The Ann Temple Allen Lodge is air-conditioned.

Camp Camwood covers 100 acres (0.40 km^{2}) in Hockley. It is only operational during the daytime.

Camp Casa Mare is a year-round camping facility for Girl Scouts ages 8–17 years old. It is located on Galveston Bay in Seabrook, Texas and under ownership of the Girl Scouts San Jacinto Council. Camp Casa Mare was founded in 1958 and has offered sailing programs, aquatics, and sporting activities, not to mention performing arts and academic classes. Fencing is also offered to campers at this site.

The Galveston Boat Club (GBC) is a two-storey building on Galveston Island. Visitors sleep on the floor on the second storey. Adult leaders can be accommodated in a separate small building. The GBC is in a residential area. Visitors primarily use the GBC to visit the island's attractions.

Camp Misty Meadows is a 328-acre (1.33 km^{2}) wooded camp located in Conroe. The main attraction of this camp is its horse riding facilities. In 2007, there was a herd of forty horses. Visitors sleep in cabins or dormitories.

Camp Myra S. Pryor includes air-conditioned cabins and a camping area. The activity center is also air-conditioned.

Camp Robinwood is a 206-acre (0.83 km^{2}) camp in Willis. Campers are accommodated in platform tents, cabins or dorms. Swimming and canoeing is conducted on Lake Ann, a man-made reservoir donated to the camp by a family whose daughter, a Brownie Scout named Ann Winchell, died at age nine. There is also an outdoor swimming pool.

Camp Silver Springs is a wooded 131-acre (0.53 km^{2}) camp located in Conroe.

Camp Whispering Pines is a 93-acre (380,000 m^{2}) site located in Garrison. Swimming, canoeing and rope assisted hill climbing are all on offer at this site.

Camp Wind-A-Mere is located in Alvin. The Tejas unit had two teepees. These were destroyed in Hurricane Ike, but will be replaced. The Caddo unit has platform tents. Pine Meadows and the Chickasaw site are camping areas. During Hurricane Ike, a great oak tree fell on the lodge and half the building was declared unsafe and unrepairable.

=== Girl Scouts of Southwest Texas ===
Girl Scouts of Southwest Texas
- Headquarters: Sally Cheever Girl Leadership Center
- Location: San Antonio, Texas
- Country: United States
- Website www.girlscouts-swtx.org

Girl Scouts of Southwest Texas serves more than 19,000 girls and was established in 2007 from the San Antonio Area council plus a large section of the old El Camino council.

==== Organization ====
Counties served: Atascosa, Bandera, Bexar, Frio, Kendall, Kerr, Medina, and Wilson from the San Antonio Area jurisdiction, Edwards, Dimmit, Kimble, Kinney, Maverick, Real, Uvalde, Val Verde, and Zavala from El Camino Council jurisdiction, Comal, Gonzales, and Guadalupe from Lone Star Council jurisdiction, and Karnes from Tip of Texas Council, now Girl Scouts of Greater South Texas jurisdiction.

Service Centers:

- Avenida Guadalupe Girl Scout Center in San Antonio, TX

==== Camps ====
- Camp La Jita is 236 acres (96 ha) on the Sabinai River near Utopia, TX. The land for it was donated in 1946 by the John F. Camp family. Campers sleep in cabins. An equestrian program is offered at this camp. La Jita means precious possession.
- Camp Mira Sol is 47 acres (19 ha) overlooking the Guadalupe River and is near Waring, TX.

Houses:

- Del Ro Girl Scout House in Val Verde county.
- Eagle Pass Girl Scout Educational Center in Maverick county
- Kerrville Girl Scout House in Kerr county
- New Braunfels Girl Scout Hous in Comal county
- Seguin Girl Scout House in Guadalupe county
- Uvalde Girl Scout House in Uvalde county

=== Girl Scouts of Texas Oklahoma Plains ===
Girl Scouts of Texas Oklahoma Plains
- Headquarters: Fort Worth, Texas
- Country: United States
- Website www.gs-top.org

Girl Scouts of Texas Oklahoma Plains serves over 24,000 girls and 9,000 adult volunteers. It was formed by the merger in January 2008 of Girl Scouts of Caprock Council, Girl Scouts-Five Star Council, Girl Scouts Norcentex Council, and Girl Scouts Circle T Council. The first Girl Scout troop in Fort Worth was formed in 1924.

==== Organization ====
Regional Offices:

- Abilene, TX
- Amarillo, TX
- Lubbock, TX
- Wichita Falls, TX
- Southlake, TX

Service Centers:

- Plainview, TX

==== Camps ====
- Camp Kiwanis
- Camp Rio Blanco
- Camp Timberlake
- Stevens Ranch
- Camp Mel Davis
- Camp Boothe Oaks

== Scouting museums in Texas ==
- Fred H. Poppe Museum, Amarillo, Texas
- Goodykoontz Museum of Girl Scout History, Houston, Texas
- National Scouting Museum, Irving, Texas
- Worth Ranch Museum, Palo Pinto, Texas
- Harbin Scouting Museum at Camp Wisdom, Dallas, Texas

== See also ==
- Alfred Michael "Chief" Venne
- Asociación de Scouts de México, A.C.
- Roy Williams (Scouting)
