= Yustaga (disambiguation) =

The Yustaga were a Timucua people of northwest Florida in the 16th and 17th centuries

Yustaga may also refer to:

- USS Yustaga (ATF-165), a fleet tug laid down for the United States Navy in 1945, but converted into a submarine rescue vessel prior to completion and commissioned as USS Skylark (ASR-20) in 1951.
- Yustaga Lodge, #385, is the Order of the Arrow group of boy scouts elected as honor campers in the Gulf Coast Council of the Boy Scouts of America
