= Oklahoma City Council (disambiguation) =

Oklahoma City Council may refer to:

- The city council of Oklahoma City, part of the Government of Oklahoma City
- Oklahoma County Council, a division of the Boy Scouts of America found 1928, renamed Central Oklahoma Council in 1930, merged out of existence in 1939
- Oklahoma City Council (BSA), a 1917–1928 division of the Boy Scouts of America
