= Scouting in New Mexico =

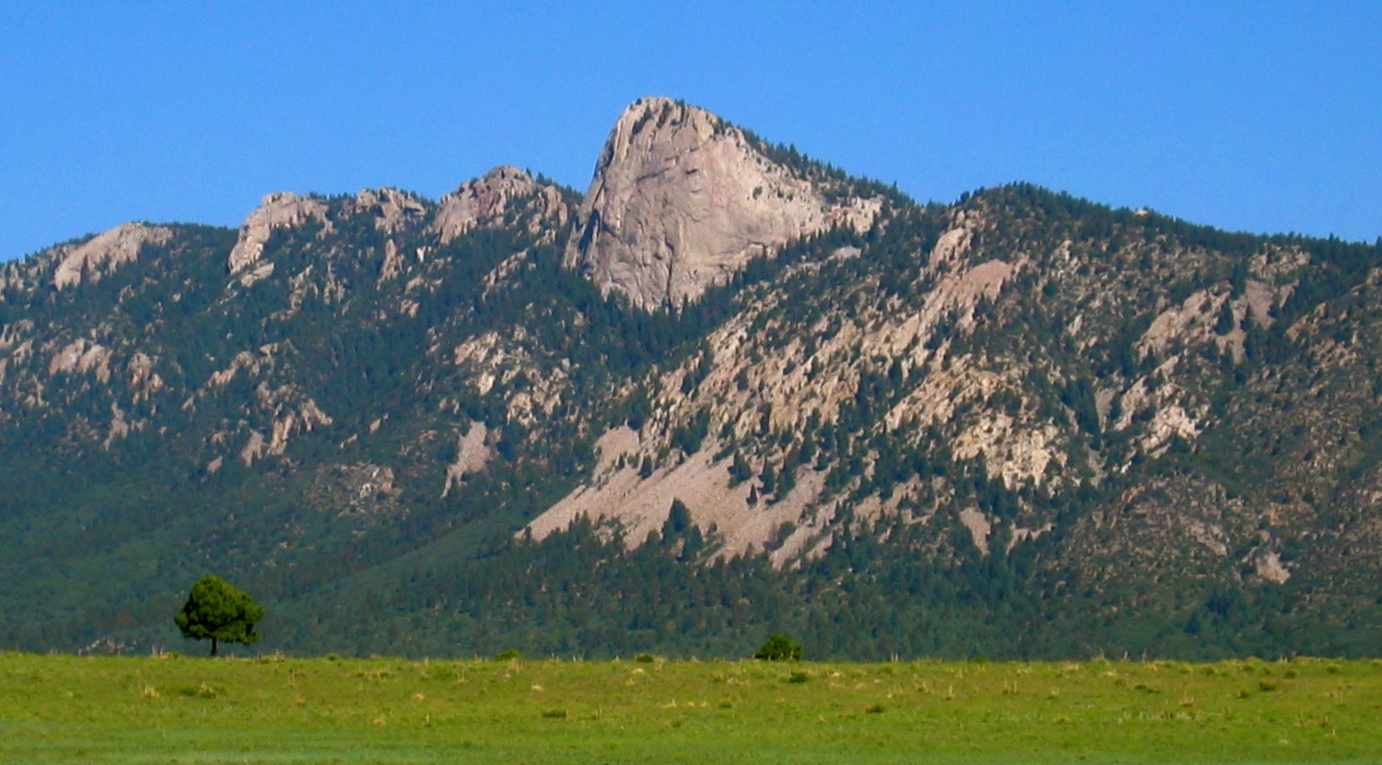
- The Tooth of Time, an icon of Philmont Scout Ranch

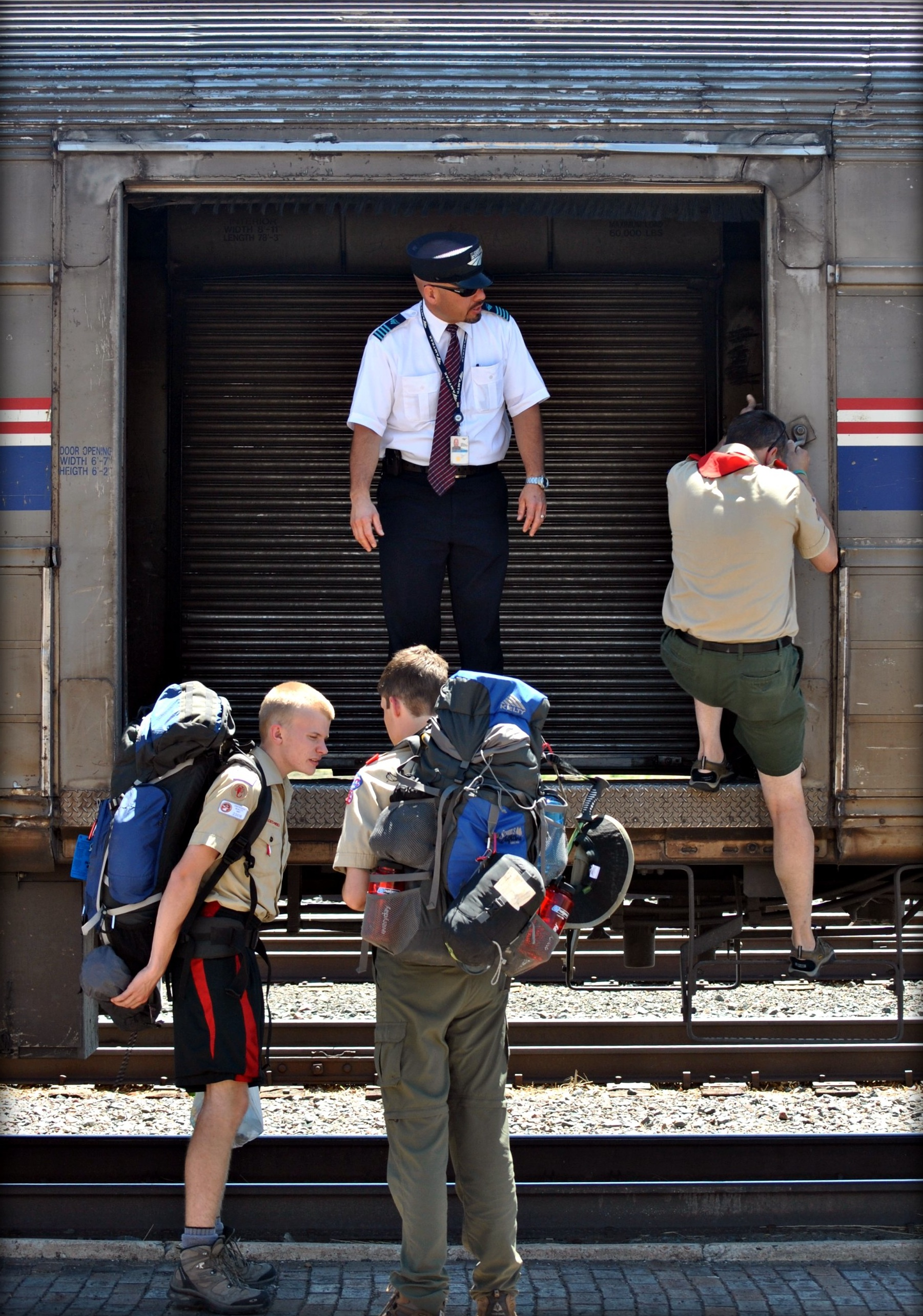
- Scouts arriving in Raton

Scouting in New Mexico began in the 1910s and continues to the present, with programs for youth in the region. The state is the location of the Philmont Scout Ranch.

== Early history (1910–1950) ==
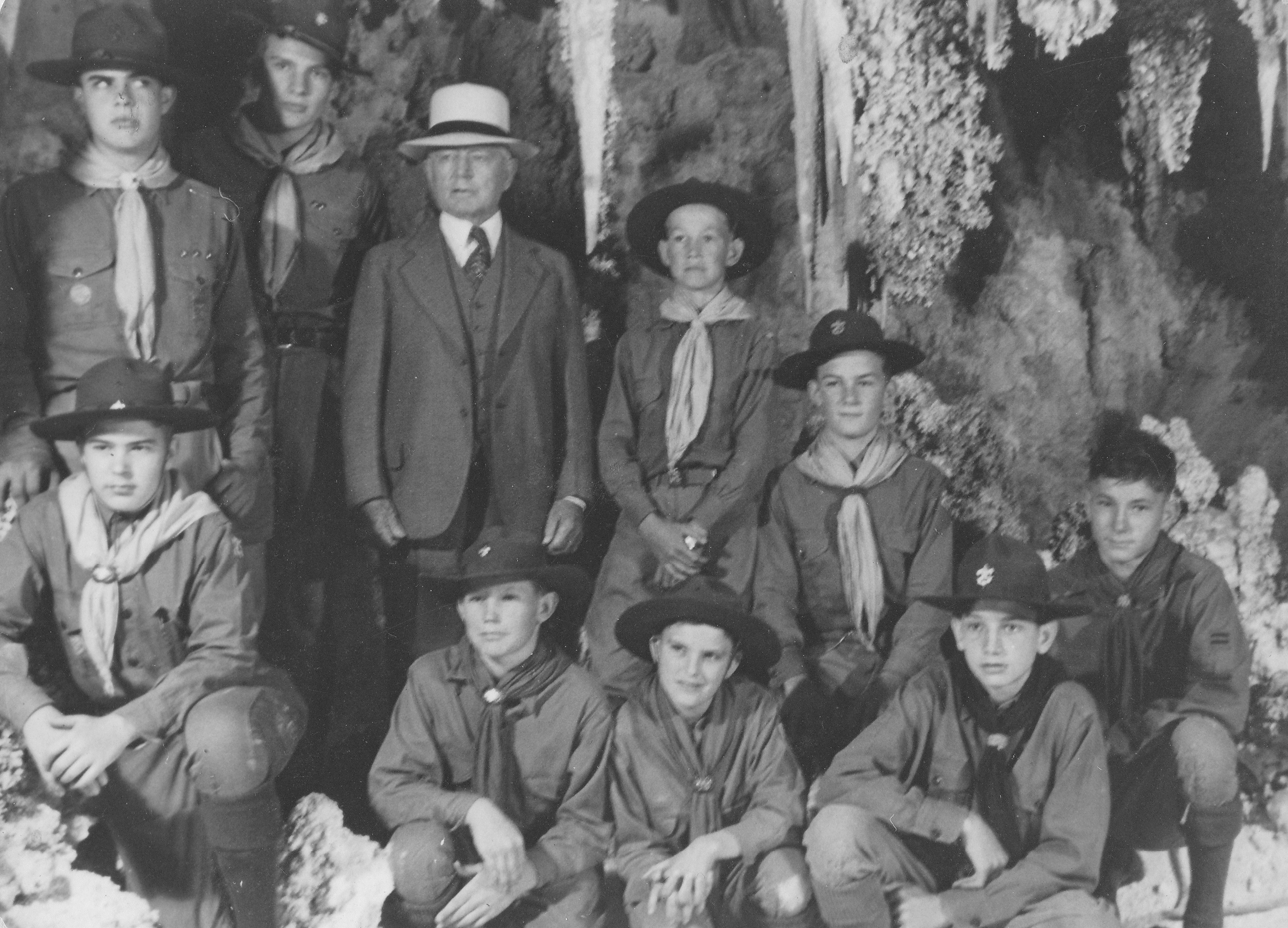
Burnham with BSA Troop, Carlsbad Caverns, 1941

On May 11, 1941, the Boy Scouts of America honored Major Frederick Russell Burnham on his eightieth birthday, at Carlsbad Caverns, New Mexico. Burnham had only recently returned from Cabeza Prieta National Wildlife Refuge which he had dedicated with the Boy Scouts in Arizona after a long campaign to save the Desert Bighorn Sheep.

In 1918, the Albuquerque Council (#412) was founded. It changed its name to the Bemalillo County Council (#412) in 1926. The council changed its name again in 1927 to the Rio Grand Area Council (#412). In 1934, the Rio Grande Area Council became the Northern New Mexico Council (#412).

In 1920, the Carlsbad Council and the Roswell Council (#413) were founded. They merged in 1924 to become the Pecos Valley Council (#413). In 1925, the Pecos Valley Council became the Eastern New Mexico Council (#413).

In 1927, the Gila Grande Council (#579) was formed, merging with the El Paso Area Council (#573) in 1930.

In 1927, the Kit Carson Council (#574) was formed, merging with the Rio Grande Council (#412) in 1929.

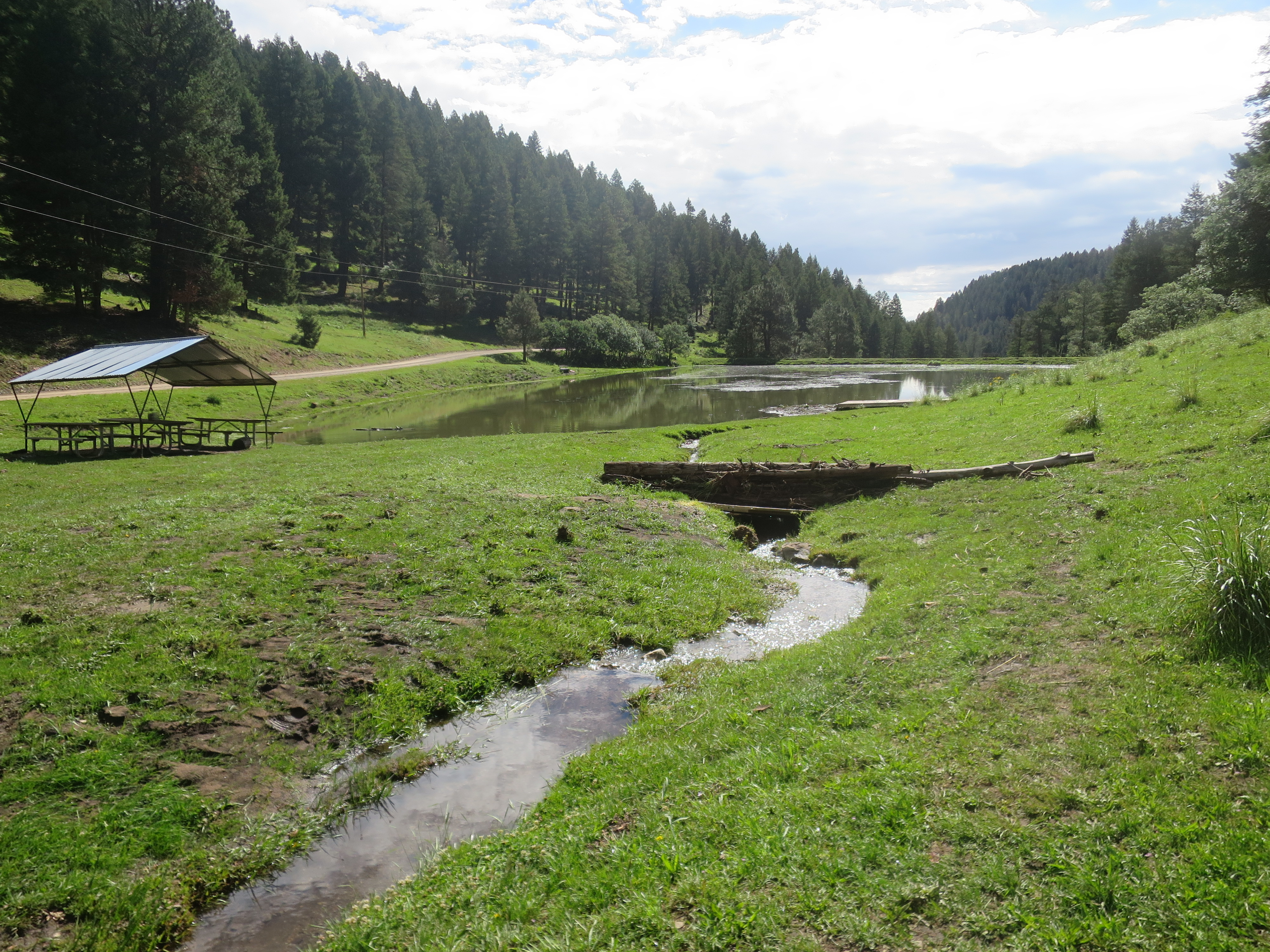
Lake in Camp Wehinahpay

== Recent history (1950–2024) ==
In 1955, the Northern New Mexico Council (#412) became the Kit Carson Council (#412). The council changed its name in 1976 to the Great Southwest Area Council, and again in 1982 to the Great Southwest Council (#412).

In 2024, the Great Southwest Council and the Yucca council merged to form the High Desert Council

=== Great Southwest Council ===
High Desert Council (#573)
- Owner: Boy Scouts of America
- Headquarters: Albuquerque, New Mexico
- Country: United States
- Website scoutingamericahighdesertcouncil.org

The Great Southwest Council was a council that was headquartered in Albuquerque, New Mexico, which provided Scouting to youth in northern New Mexico, northeast Arizona, Utah south of the San Juan River, and the Durango and Mesa Verde areas of Colorado. The council was merged with the Yucca council in 2024, to form the High Desert Council.

=== Yucca Council ===
Yucca Council was a council that served Scouts in Texas and New Mexico, until it was merged to form the High Desert Council in 2024.

== Scouting in New Mexico today ==
There are five Boy Scouts of America (BSA) local councils in New Mexico.

=== Conquistador Council ===
Conquistador Council (#413)
- Owner: Boy Scouts of America
- Headquarters: Roswell, New Mexico
- Country: United States
- President: Chris Lauderman
- Council Commissioner: Michael Hunter
- Scout Executive: Karl Shelton
- Website www.conquistador-bsa.net

Located in southeast New Mexico, the Conquistador Council office is in Roswell, New Mexico.

==== Organization ====
- Chisum Trail District - Eddy County
- El Llano Grande District - Curry, De Baca & Roosevelt Counties
- Oil Patch District - Lea County
- Rio Hondo District - Chaves County
- Sierra Blanca District - Lincoln County

==== Camps ====
- Camp Wehinahpay, Wehinahpay Mountain Camp
- Dowling Aquatic Base
- Camp Jim Murray

==== Order of the Arrow ====
The Kwahadi Lodge #78 of the Order of the Arrow serves local Arrowmen.

=== Grand Canyon Council ===
Grand Canyon Council serves Scouts in Arizona and New Mexico.

==== Organization ====
- Rio Grande District
- San Juan Mountains District
- Sangre de Cristo District
- Sandia District

==== Camps ====
The Great Southwest Council's summer camp program is based at the Gorham Scout Ranch, located near Chimayo, New Mexico northwest of Pojoaque, New Mexico.

Great Southwest Council is home to Cimarron, New Mexico's Philmont Scout Ranch, the oldest of the national high-adventure bases operated by the Boy Scouts of America.

Although the Mesa Verde District of the Great Southwest Council includes San Juan County, Colorado, the council no longer owns or operate the Cascade Scout Camp located in the San Juan National Forest, north of Durango, Colorado, and listed on the National Register of Historic Places.

=== South Plains Council ===
South Plains Council serves Scouts in Texas and New Mexico.

== Girl Scouting in New Mexico ==
Girl Scouting in New Mexico
- Map of Girl Scout Councils in New Mexico

Three Girl Scout Councils serve New Mexico.

=== Girl Scouts Arizona Cactus-Pine Council ===
Most of this district is in Arizona but as the Navajo Nation straddles the border the portion of it in northwestern New Mexico is also included in this district.

=== Girl Scouts of New Mexico Trails ===
Girl Scouts of New Mexico Trails
- Headquarters: Albuquerque, New Mexico
- Country: United States
- Website nmgirlscouts.org

Girl Scouts of New Mexico Trails serves some 5,000 girls in 23 counties in northern and central New Mexico. It was formed in November 2007 by the merger of the two previous councils of Sangre de Cristo and Chaparral.

==== Camps ====
- Camp Elliott Barker located near Angel Fire, NM
- Rancho del Chaparral located in the Jemez Mountains

=== Girl Scouts of the Desert Southwest ===
Formed from the May 1, 2009 merger of Zia, Permian Basin and Rio Grande Councils. Serving Southern New Mexico & West Texas.

==== Organization ====
Service Centers in New Mexico

- Deming, NM
- Artesia, NM
- Las Cruces, NM
- Silver City, NM

==== Camps ====
- Camp Pioneer

== Scouting museums in New Mexico ==
The Scouting Museum of New Mexico, formerly run by Dennis Downing was located at 400 South First Street in Raton, New Mexico, is permanently closed. The museum was privately owned at a private facility, displays included Wood Badge, Philmont, Order of the Arrow, National Jamboree, international Scouting, Scout books and magazines, videos, reference library, and also rotated loaned exhibits.

The National Scouting Museum is located at Philmont Scout Ranch, 4 miles south of Cimarron, NM on NM-21. The National Scouting Museum is also home to the Ernest Thompson Seton Memorial Library.

== See also ==
- Theodore Roosevelt
- Asociación de Scouts de México, A.C.
