= Meztitla Scout Camp School =

Camp in the Mexican central highlands

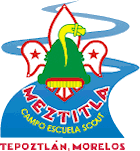
- Owner: Asociación de Scouts de México, A.C.
- Location: Tepoztlán, Morelos
- Country: Mexico
- Coordinates: 18.9941°N 99.0864°W
- Founded: 1956
- Founder: Paul E. Loewe
- Director: Francisco Banda García
- Website www.scoutsmexico.org/meztitla

The Meztitla Scout Camp School (Campo Escuela Scout Meztitla) is the national Scout camp and school owned by the Asociación de Scouts de México, A.C., located in the Central Highlands of Mexico, northeast of the municipality of Tepoztlán, in the state of Morelos. Nestled under the rocky slopes of the 3,430 metres (11,250 ft) Sierra de Ajusco-Chichinauhtzin, in the Yautepec River watershed. It is located 30 miles (48 km) south of Mexico City and 9 miles (14 km) northeast of Cuernavaca.

== Background ==
The Meztitla Scout Camp School was founded through the generosity of Paul E. Loewe, who in 1956 donated the first lands to later become the campsite. Later more lands were acquired to become the modern Scout Camp School of Mexico.

The name Meztitla is derived from the original concept "Place of the Moon" or "Place near the Moon" in the Nahuatl language, due to nearby cave paintings in one of cliffs in the hills that surround the camp.

Several worldwide Scout events have been held at Meztitla, including Rover Moots and Indabas.

The Meztitla Scout Camp School is frequented by Scouts from around the world, and is also open to the public in general.

== Important events ==
Event	Year	Date	Theme/Name
II EEAS	1981		
III EEAS	1982	September 18–19	
Canditropa	1983		
IV EEAS	1983		
V EEAS	1984		
IX National Indaba	1987		1907 Browsea, "80 years later"
XV Central American Scout Camporee	1990		
X National Indaba	1990		Nature, our beginning and end (La Naturaleza nuestro origen y fin)
XII EEAS	1991	September 14–16	
XI National Indaba	1992		
XIII EEAS	1992		
Nacional de Manadas	199		You and I are of the same blood (tú y yo somos de la misma sangre)
XIV EEAS	1993	November 19–21	
XII National Indaba	1994		
XVI EEAS	1995		
XVII EEAS	1996		
XVIII EEAS	1997		
XX EEAS	1999		20th anniversary
11th World Scout Moot	2000	July	Tradition for Tomorrow (Tradición para el mañana)
Canditropa	2000		
XXI EEAS	2000	November	
XXII EEAS	2001	November	
XXIII EEAS	2002	November	
XXVI EEAS	2005	November 18–20	
