= Juan Lainé Desombres =

- Born: July 4, 1884; Puebla
- Died: May 21, 1977 (aged 92)
- Occupation: Real estate agent
- Known for: Served on the World Scout Committee of the World Organization of the Scout Movement

Juan Antonio Lainé Desombres (4 July 1884, in Puebla – 21 May 1977) was a real estate agent in Mexico City, served on the World Scout Committee of the World Organization of the Scout Movement from 1947 to 1949 and again from 1951 to 1957.

Lainé invested himself in the Knights of Columbus, and joined the Mexican Scout movement when he reorganized it in 1931.

In 1942 he was elected National Chief Scout and President of the National Council until 1949. He resigned for six months to organize the Inter-American Scout Conference in Mexico City. In 1949, the office of President of the Council and Chief Scout were separated. With the office of President on his shoulders and as International Secretary, he made numerous trips throughout the Americas to promote the creation of the Inter-American Scout Council. He participated in a preparatory meeting in 1945 at the Schiff Scout Reservation in the United States, at the first Scout conference in Bogotá where the Inter-American Scout Council was constituted. He became president of the council in May 1948. He was re-elected at the second conference held in Mexico City. He was elected a member of the World Scout Committee for a term from 1947 to 1949 at the World Scout Conference in Salzburg and from 1951 to 1957.

He received high awards from several Scout associations and received from Pope Pius XII the Order of the Holy Sepulchre and the Order of St. George. He received the Silver Antelope, the highest decoration of Mexican Scouting, in 1942. In 1966, Lainé was awarded the Bronze Wolf, the only distinction of the World Organization of the Scout Movement, awarded by the World Scout Committee for exceptional services to world Scouting, the first Mexican to receive the award.

He died in 1977 after being president of the Mexican Red Cross.
