= Jorge Toral Azuela =

Jorge Toral Azuela served as the International Commissioner of the Asociación de Scouts de México, Asociación Civil.

In 1975, he was awarded the Bronze Wolf, the only distinction of the World Organization of the Scout Movement, by the World Scout Committee for exceptional services to world Scouting at the 25th World Scout Conference. He was also a recipient of the Silver World Award.
