= South Plains Council =

Texas council of Scouting America

Coordinates: 33.1667°N 101.4147°W

South Plains Council (#694)
- Headquarters: 30 Briercroft Office Park; Lubbock, Texas 79412
- Location: Texas
- Country: United States
- Founded: January 1925
- Defunct: June 1, 2026
- Founders: Kennedy N. Clapp; DR. J. C. Loveless; L. S. Harkey; Marshall Mason; Sam A. Henry; Joe N. Spikes; Dr. Pail V. Horn; H. B. Palmer
- Website southplainscouncil.org

South Plains Council was a former Scouting America council based in Lubbock, Texas. In 2026, the council merged with the Amarillo-based Golden Spread Council, with the merger becoming official on June 1. The new council name, Prairie Sky Council, was revealed on June 26.

== Organization ==
- Chaparral District (Including Tasiwoo chapter)
- Comanche Trail District
- George White District
- Haynes District
- Quanah Parker District

== Camps ==
C. W. Post Memorial Camp (Camp Post), established in 1926, is a Boy Scout camp located in Garza County, Texas, about 4 miles (6 km) southwest of Post, Texas, off Farm to Market Road 669. It was named in honor of cereal magnate, C.W. Post, who founded the nearby town. The camp is located along the Caprock Escarpment of the Llano Estacado in the area formerly occupied by the headquarters of the Llano Ranch, also known as the Curry Comb Ranch. Camp Post utilizes the Curry Comb brand in its insignia, a capital T with two horizontal bars above it.

=== History ===
Around 1879 the Llano Cattle Company acquired approximately 120 square miles (310 km^{2}) in Garza County, including the land on which Camp Post is now situated. In 1883 they moved their ranch headquarters to the current site of Camp Post. A two-story frame house was built and a well was dug, this being the first hand-dug well in Garza County. The old well site is still visible today, and is located just south of Pioneer road, about halfway between the trading post and the swimming pool. The original wooden curb burned in 1937 and has been replaced by a replica.

The first recorded birth and death in Garza County took place here in February 1884, when Kate McCommis was born, daughter of Jim and Della Browning McCommis. She died the same day. Her grave is located about 150 feet southeast of the present-day dining hall.

C. W. Post purchased the land from the Llano Cattle Company in 1907 to pursue his dream of building a city. He built the town of Post about 4 miles (6 km) northwest and sold most of the arable farmland to settlers.

In 1926, the Post estate gave 400 acres (160 ha), encompassing the former ranch headquarters, to the South Plains Council of the Boy Scouts of America for use as a camp.

=== Facilities ===
Camp Post's facilities include 12 camping areas, a dining hall, a ropes course, a rifle range, an archery range, an equestrian center, swimming pool, campfire ring, trading post, the OA Lodge, and the Mallet training center, used for leathercraft. A rustic outdoor chapel was built in 1959 by Phi Delta Theta fraternity.

=== Activities ===
Activities include shooting sports (BB guns, pellet guns, .22 rifle, and shotgun), archery, astronomy, horseshoes, fishing, fire-building, storytelling, first aid, geocaching, roping, hiking, leathercraft, knot-tying, canoeing, and outdoor cookery. Weekend campouts for area scouts are regularly scheduled including Cowboy Camp, Cub Camp, and Webelos Woods.

=== Natural resources ===
Water resources include Cottonwood Creek, Bobcat Creek, Dove Canyon Creek, Falls Canyon Creek, and Lake Marjorie. Common birds include American robin, cardinal, and mockingbird. Mammal species include bobcat and coyote. Some of the common trees are cottonwood, mesquite, and juniper. Common grasses include blue grama, buffalograss, hooded windmillgrass, perennial three-awn, plains bristlegrass, sideoats grama, and silver bluestem. Other plant life commonly seen include feather dalea, yucca, prickly-pear cactus, and cholla.

== Order of the Arrow ==
South Plains Council is served by Nakona Lodge 150 of the Order of the Arrow.
