= Francisco Macías Valadéz =

International Commissioner of the Asociación de Scouts de México, Asociación Civil

Francisco Macías Valadéz served as the International Commissioner of the Asociación de Scouts de México, Asociación Civil.

In 1971, he was awarded the 69th Bronze Wolf, the only distinction of the World Organization of the Scout Movement, awarded by the World Scout Committee for exceptional services to world Scouting.
