= Paul E. Loewe =

- Known for: Early Mexican Scouting notable

Dr. Paul E. Loewe was an early Mexican Scouting notable, who in 1956 donated the first lands which would become the Meztitla Scout Camp School, the largest Scout camp in Mexico.

Meztitla was originally property of Dr. Loewe, who in 1956 donated the first lands for the campsite to the Asociación de Scouts de México, Asociación Civil.
