= Golden Spread Council =

Boy Scout Council of western TX and OK

Golden Spread Council (#562)
- Owner: Golden Spread Council
- Headquarters: 401 Tascosa Rd, Amarillo, Texas
- Country: United States
- Founded: 1987
- Defunct: June 1, 2026
- President: Dr. Brian Weis
- Commissioner: Rebecca Holcomb
- Scout Executive: Brian Tobler
- Website www.goldenspread.org

The Golden Spread Council was a local council of Scouting America that served youth in the panhandles of Texas and Oklahoma. Its service area included all or part of 23 counties in Texas and three counties in Oklahoma. Through 2010, the council served approximately 5,300 youth members and 1,700 adult leaders.

== History ==
The council was formed in 1987 from the consolidation of the Llano Estacado Council (#562) (based in Amarillo, Texas) and the Adobe Walls Council (#569) (based in Pampa, Texas). In 2026, the council merged with the Lubbock-based South Plains Council, with the merger becoming official on June 1 and the new name of Prairie Sky Council (#562) being revealed on June 23, 2026.

== Organization ==
- Golden Eagle District
- Lone Wolf District
- Quanah Parker District
- Adobe Walls District
- Chaparral District
- Comanche Trails District
- George White District

== Camps ==
The Golden Spread (Now Prairie Sky) Council owns and operates four camp properties, Camp Don Harrington in Canyon, Texas; Camp M.K. Brown by Wheeler, Texas, Camp C.W. Post in Post, Texas and Tres Ritos Scout Camp in Vadito, NM.

These facilities offer a wide range of camping, hiking and outdoor opportunities, including: miles of hiking trails, ponds, lakes and rivers, open fields, rustic camp sites, sheltered camp sites, tent camping sites, and a dining hall with restroom facilities.

=== Camp Don Harrington ===
Camp Don Harrington, commonly referred to as Camp Don, is an 1,600-acre (6.5 km^{2}) Boy Scout camp in Randall County near Canyon, Texas. The original 640 acres (2.6 km^{2}) were donated by oil man and investor Don Harrington on December 25, 1945. In 1994, Sybil Harrington, Don Harrington's wife, donated the money to refurbish the camp with repaving the roads, refurbishing the health lodge, a new quartermaster building, and building the new Cub Scout World.

==== Geography ====
Camp Don Harrington is located in the western Palo Duro Canyon system on the Prairie Dog Town Fork Red River, 10 miles (16 km) south of Amarillo, Texas and 8 miles (13 km) northeast of Canyon, Texas with an elevation of 3,590 feet (1,090 m) above sea level. It has a semi-arid temperate steppe climate, with the average summer high temperature in the high 90s and average winter low temperature in the low 20s. The average yearly rainfall is 19.6 inches.

The majority of camp sites and facilities are located inside the canyon. It is more rugged and forested than the surrounding prairie, creating a more desirable camping experience. A variety of plant and wildlife exist in the camp. The canyon floor is spotted with yucca, mesquite, cactus, and other prairie grasses and shrubs. Closer to the river, one can find larger trees and even a bamboo stand. Wildlife in the camp include coyotes, deer, prairie dogs, rattlesnakes (no bites reported in many years), and a wide array of insects.

==== Facilities and Programs ====
Camp Don Harrington has 18 permanent campsites available year-round, each with a cleared area, a fire ring, running water (except during winter months) and a latrine. An earth-fill dam has been erected on the river forming a small pond suitable for fishing, boating and canoeing. Permanent structures include a dining hall with kitchen, swimming pools, first aid station, administrative building, quartermasters shed, trading post, Campmaster's quarters (with 2 bedrooms, kitchen, full bath, and living room) and ranger's house. The camp has an archery range, rifle range, shotgun range, and a council ring. A COPE area includes a ropes course and a climbing wall with a zip line. A newer addition is a four element "Cub World" with a pirate ship, fort, castle, and tee-pee.

The Camp is used for weekend camping by nearby units. It also holds annual merit badge summer camps and winter camps and Cub Scout day camp. Order of the Arrow activities take place there along with Wood Badge training.

=== Camp M.K. Brown ===
Camp M.K. Brown covers a section of land near Wheeler, TX, and contains a 65-acre lake. It was built in 1968 with the generous donations from Montagu Kingsmill Brown, for which the camp is named.

==== Geography ====
Camp M.K. Brown is located 35 miles East of Pampa, Texas and 5 miles Northwest of Wheeler, Texas on Highway 152 in Wheeler County with an elevation of 2,526 feet above sea level. Sweetwater Creek runs South through the camp with multiple dams creating one large reservoir and four smaller ponds collectively known as Valley Springs Lakes. It has a semi-arid temperate steppe climate, with the average summer high temperature in the 90s and an average winter low temperature in the low 20s. The average yearly rainfall is 22 inches.

The camp is heavily wooded with huge, old cottonwood trees. There are pear trees, wild plum shrubs, mulberry trees, and blackberry bushes located around the camp closer to the creek. Plant life away from the water is the usual yucca, mesquite, cactus, and prairie grasses local to the area. Wildlife includes turtle, rabbit, prairie dogs, coyotes, bobcat, deer, and pit vipers like rattlesnakes and water moccasins.

==== Programs and Facilities ====
Camp M.K. Brown has 11 permanent campsites and 3 semi-permanent campsites available year-round, each with cleared areas and a fire ring. Most have running water (except during winter months) and a latrine nearby. The main lake is suitable for fishing, canoeing, row boating, and swimming. The swimming area is marked off from the end of the main dock to the shoreline. The ponds are suitable for fishing only. Permanent structures include a dining hall with kitchen, nature and crafts building, administrative building, Trading Post, adult showers, and a ranger's house. The camp has an archery range, rifle range, shotgun range, and a council ring.

The camp is used for weekend camping by nearby units. It also holds annual merit badge summer camps, camporees, and Cub Scout day camp. Order of the Arrow activities take place there along with Wood Badge and other youth training events.

== Order of the Arrow ==
Nischa Achowalogen Lodge #486

=== Chapters ===
- Busy Beaver
- Cherokee
- Iron Horse
- Zulu

== See also ==
- Scouting in Texas
