= Asociación de Scouts de México, Asociación Civil =

Scouting association in Mexico

Scouts de Mexico
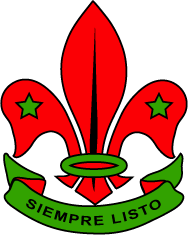
- Headquarters: Mexico City
- Country: Mexico
- Founded: 1920
- Membership: 45,785
- National Chief Scout: Pedro Díaz Maya
- National Scout President: Francisco Macías Valadez Treviño
- Affiliation: World Organization of the Scout Movement
- Website http://www.scouts.org.mx

The Asociación de Scouts de México, Asociación Civil (ASMAC) is a Scouting association in Mexico. ASMAC was formed in 1920 and became a member of the World Organization of the Scout Movement on August 26, 1926. It was registered as a Civil Association by the Mexican government on 24 February 1943. ASMAC claimed 33,509 members (as of 2011). The ASMAC headquarters are located in Mexico City.

== Overview ==
Corporate logo of the Asociación de Scouts de México

Juan Lainé served on the Boy Scouts International Committee of the Boy Scouts International Conference from 1947 to 1949 and again from 1951 to 1957. In 1961, Lainé was awarded the Bronze Wolf, the only distinction of the Boy Scouts International Conference, awarded by the Boy Scouts International Committee for exceptional services to world Scouting. Other ASMAC recipients include Macias Valadez in 1971, and Jorge Toral A. in 1975.

== Program ==
Caballero Aguila badge

Groups registered at ASMAC follow a development program called ENPE (Esquema Nacional de Programa Educativo). The highest rank is the Caballero Aguila, literally Eagle Knight. The name comes from the ancient Aztec army. This program divides Scouts, depending on their ages, into the following sections:

Name	Ages (Years)	Uniform color
Cub (Manada)	6-10	Yellow
Troop (Tropa)	11-14	Green
Pioneers (Caminantes)	15-17	Blue
Rover Clan (Clan de Rovers)	18-22	Red
Scouter (Scouter or Dirigente)	22+	Grey

== Structure ==
The highest authority of the ASMAC lies in the General Assembly of Associates' which is called the National Assembly, which meets in an ordinary manner, once a year and in extraordinary sessions as many times as necessary.

=== The National Assembly ===
It is composed of the following 'Associates' : the members of the National Council, the National Honor Court, the Surveillance Commission, the provincial presidents, the National Scout Chief (only if he is a volunteer), the elected by the provinces and those elected by the National Council. The sessions of the National Assembly are chaired by the National President.

=== National Scout Chief ===
The National Scout Chief is elected every three years by the National Council and can be re-elected. The Chief Scout can be executive or volunteer.

==== Recent Nationals Chief ====
- Raúl Arturo Sánchez Vaca (2002-2010): Elected National Scout Chief in a voluntary position, in 2005 CEN promoted him as National Executive Scout Chief, a position he held until 2010, taking office as Regional Director of the WOSM of the offices of the Interamerican Scout Region in Panama on April 1, 2010.
- José Adolfo López Sampsom Félix (2010-2011): Having held the position of National Scout Chief years ago, he was elected to the position in 2010, resigning on October 22, 2011.
- Ana Lorena Gudiño Valdez (2011-2015): Elected on October 22, 2011 by the National Council, she was the first woman to hold the position of National Executive Scout Chief. On February 7, 2015, she submitted her resignation under protest before the National Council. In a statement issued by the National Council on February 21, 2015, the termination of her employment contract and the dismissal of the position of National Scout Chief were announced as of February 17, 2015.
- José Luis Cárdenas Cortés (2015-2017): Appointed National Scout Head on a voluntary basis by the National Council on February 7, 2015.
- Currently Pedro Díaz Maya, holds the position of National Scout Chief.

== Largest fleur de lis in the world ==
A Scout event held each year since 2000, originally organized to promote the 11th World Scout Moot that was held that year in Mexico. More than 10,000 Scouts from all Mexico come to the main square of Mexico City and draw a gigantic fleur de lis, the emblem of the WOSM. It is drawn on a 10,000 m^{2} area, and filled up with aluminum cans.

In 2007, the year of the World Scouting Centenary, a dove was incorporated into the original design as a symbol of Scouting as a universal movement of peace. In 2007 the Flor de Liz más Grande del Mundo was one of Mexico's gifts of peace.

== Meztitla Scout Camp School ==
Owned by the ASMAC and located in Tepoztlán, Morelos, Meztitla is a scout camp school frequently visited by Scouts of Mexico and from all around the world as well by camping enthusiasts.

Meztitla was originally property of Dr. Paul E. Loewe, but in 1956 he donated the first lands for the campsite. The name Meztitla is a word derived from Náhuatl, which literally means "place near the Moon", due to ancient Aztec cave painting which depicts the Moon, inside a cave on a hill in the surroundings.

== See also ==
- Scouting in Mexico
- WOSM-Interamerican Region
