= Gulf Coast Council =

Council of the Boy Scouts of America

Gulf Coast Council (Florida)
- Owner: Boy Scouts of America
- Headquarters: Pensacola, Florida
- Country: United States
- Website http://www.gulfcoastcouncil.org/

Gulf Coast Council of the Boy Scouts of America serves over 5,000 youth in traditional Scouting and in Learning for Life programs in 11 counties of the Florida panhandle and three counties in Alabama. The council service center is located in Pensacola, Florida. The council's name refers to the Gulf Coast of the United States.

== History ==
Scouting was active in the area as early as 1909 through the YMCA, but the first council to serve a portion of the current council territory was the Pensacola Council chartered as a second class council in Pensacola in 1914. The council only lasted until 1916 and afterwards area troops were served by the BSA's Direct Service. In 1926 the Choctawhatchee Council (#726) out of Dothan, Alabama added Panama City, Florida Scouts. In 1927 the Satsumaland Council (#773) was formed and included three Florida and two Alabama counties. In 1930 the Alabama counties became part of the Mobile Area Council. In July 1934 seven additional Florida counties were moved the Satsumaland Council. In 1935 the Alabama counties were added back into the council's service area and the name was changed to the Gulf Coast Council. On January 30, 1935, a corporate charter was filed with the State of Florida.

== Organization ==
The council is administratively divided into 4 districts:

- Long Leaf Pine District - serving the Conecuh, Escambia, and Monroe Counties in Alabama.
- Choctawhatchee District - serving the Okaloosa and Walton Counties in Florida.
- Pensacola Bay District - serving the Escambia and Santa Rosa Counties in Florida.
- Lake Sands District - serving the Bay, Gulf, Holmes, and Washington Counties in Florida.

== Camps ==
In 1961, the Spanish Trail Scout Reservation (STSR) was founded in the Gulf Coast Council. STSR is one of the largest Scout reservations in the southeast. It offers a full range of facilities including: a 40-acre (160,000 m^{2}) lake for swimming, canoeing, and fishing; a dining hall; and many places to camp. There are two camps on the STSR, Camp Euchee and Camp Jambo, each with full camping facilities.

== Order of the Arrow ==
Yustaga Lodge was founded in 1948 thanks to the foresight and efforts of Ted Childress and Norman Savelle, Field Scout Executives of the Gulf Coast Council. That year, a chief and eleven braves from Alibamu Lodge #179 of the Tukabatchee Area Council of Montgomery, Alabama visited the Gulf Coast Council's Camp Big Heart on May 21–22, 1948, where they bestowed the title of Honor Camper and Order of the Arrow member upon 24 Scouts and Scouters.

Charter members of Yustaga Lodge include

- Thurston A. Shell
- Jack Shreve
- Fred Polhemus
- Glen Ivey
- Ray Kelly
- Wallace King
- Bo Sharpless - Elected as Scribe
- Bill Stewart
- Oswald Geiger
- Cecil Sewell
- Ed Nowak
- DeWitt Thompson
- Albert Pledger - Elected as Treasurer
- Lamar Henderson
- Tiller Phillips
- Charles Dial
- Captain Wayne Sage
- Robert Smith
- Ed Crowe
- Melvin Hatcher
- Harry Sampley
- Cdr. H.M. McDowell
- Norman Savelle
- Ted Childress - Elected as First Chief

The first Order of the Arrow business meeting was called to order by Netami Sakima (Chief) T.A. Shell at Camp Big Heart on September 11, 1948. The first item of business was to select a lodge name. “Yustaga” was chosen and was unanimously accepted by the lodge. The Osprey (fish hawk) was selected as lodge totem, and green and white as the lodge colors (this was later changed to gold and white).

The name Yustaga comes from a small but powerful Florida tribe that was a part of the Creek nation. Translated, the words mean “Drinkers of the Fire Water”.

The Yustaga Lodge also is known for having a wide variety of patches.

Yustaga Lodge is the Order of The Arrow associated with the Gulf Coast Council. As of May 2025, Yustaga Lodge host 4 Chapters.

- Appalachee Chapter - Serving Arrowmen in Washington, Holmes, Bay, and Gulf Counties.
- Choctaw Chapter - Serving Arrowman of Walton and Okaloosa Counties.
- Oschambos Chapter - Serving Arrowmen in Conecuh, Monroe, and Escambia (AL) Counties.
- Woapalanne Chapter - Serving Arrowmen in Santa Rosa and Escambia (FL) Counties.
