= Scouting in Oklahoma =

- Life size Boy Scout bronze statue located at the entrance of the Osage County Historical Museum

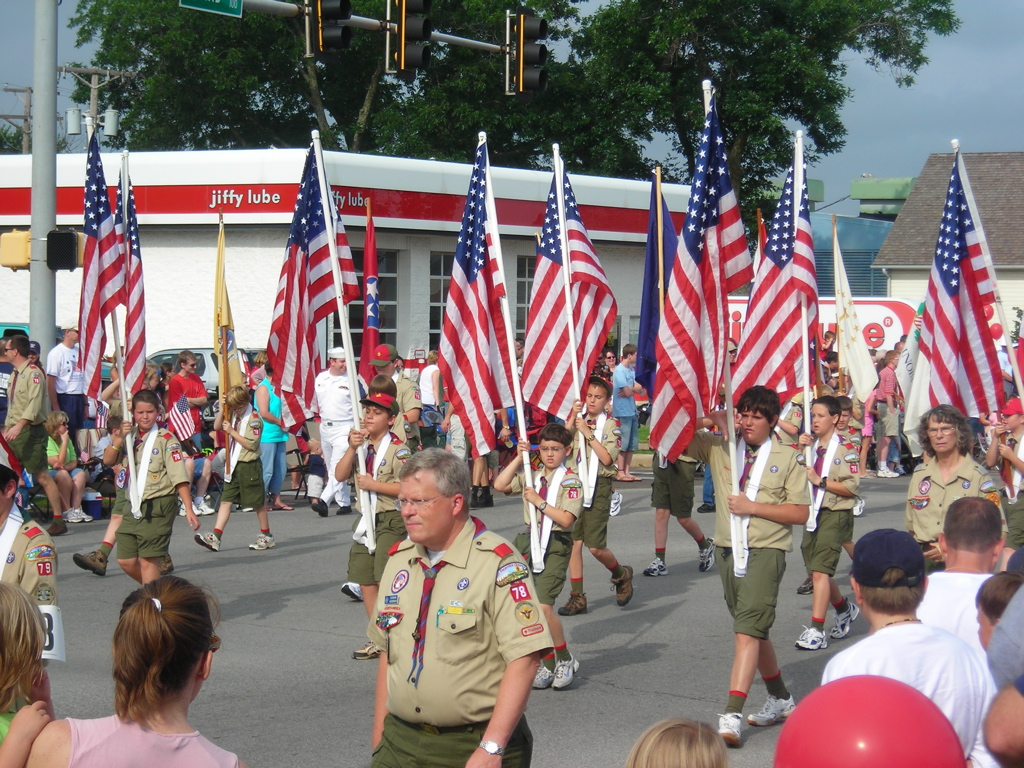
- LibertyFest Parade

Scouting in Oklahoma has a long history, from the 1910s to the present day, serving thousands of youth in programs that suit the environment in which they live.

== Early history (1909–1950) ==
The first Boy Scout troop in America is claimed to have been organized in Pawhuska, in May 1909 by John F. Mitchell. Pawhuska is in the Cherokee Area Council.

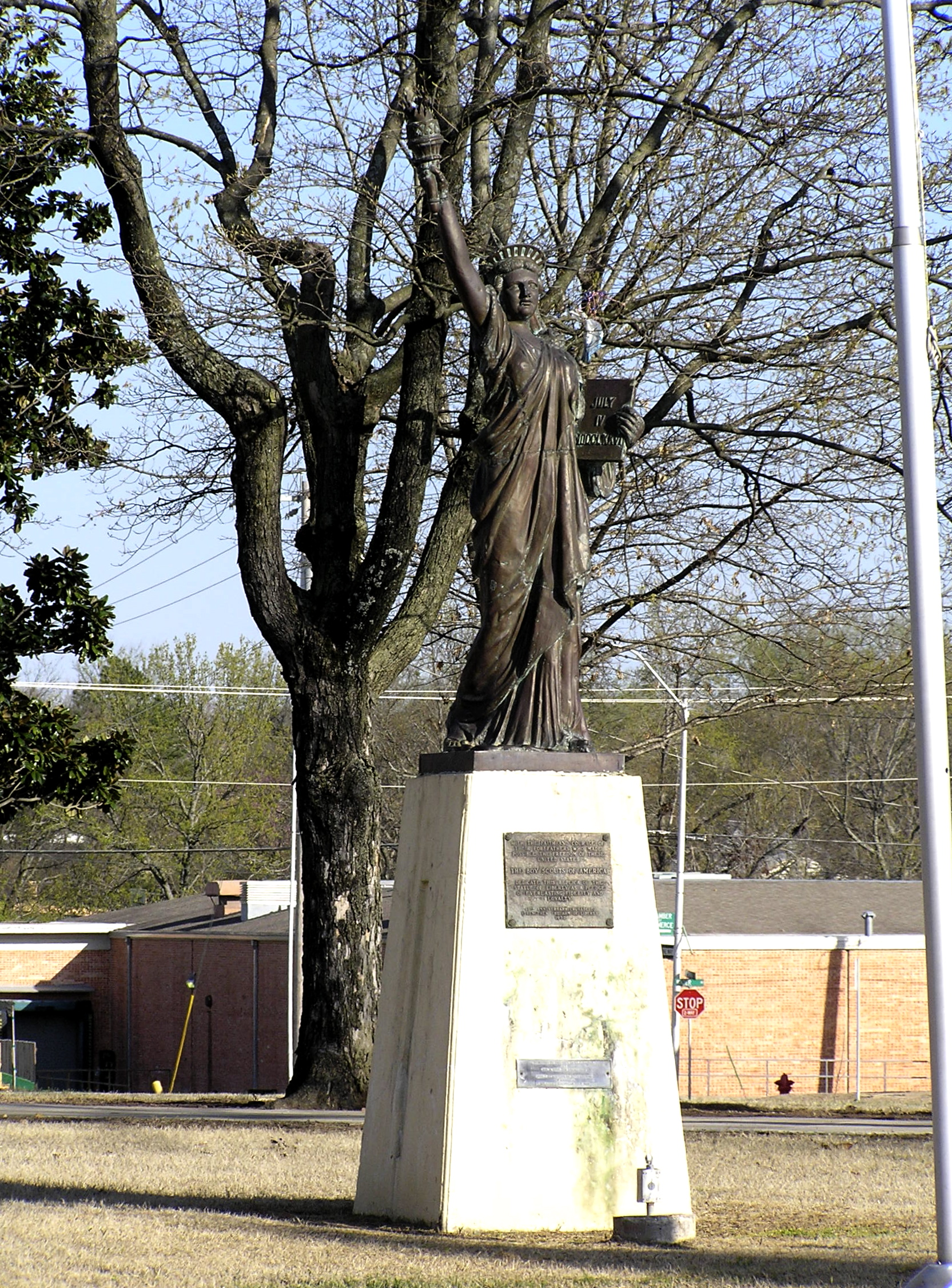
Lady Liberty of Tahlequah, part of Strengthen the Arm of Liberty

In 1917, the Guthrie Council was formed. It closed in 1918.

In 1921, the Miami Council was formed. It closed that same year.

The Hobart Council (#476) was founded in 1922. It closed in 1925.

The Durant Council was founded in 1921 and changed its name in 1923 to the Kiamichi Area Council (#736).

In 1930, the Kiamichi Area Council (#736) dissolved with parts going to T-O Council, Lamar County Council, Red River Area Council and the Pontotoc County Council.

In 1918, the Ardmore Council (#468) was founded. It merged into the Red River Area Council (#468) in 1925.

In 1922, the Garvin and McClain Area Council (#475) was founded. It merged into the Red River Area Council (#468) in 1925.

In 1925, the Red River Area Council (#468) was founded. It changed its name to the Chickasaw Council (#468) in 1930.

In 1930, the Chickasaw Council (#468) was founded. It merged into the Arbuckle Area Council in 1946.

In 1920, the Pontotoc County Council (#484) was founded. It merged into the Arbuckle Area Council in 1946.

In 1917, the Bartlesville Council (#469) was founded. It changed its name to the Cherokee Area Council (#469) in 1925.

In 1922, the Pawhuska Council (#462) was founded. It changed its name to the Osage County Council in 1923.

In 1923, the Osage County Council (#482) was founded. It changed its name to the Osage and Pawnee Counties Area Council (#469) in 1925. In 1926, the council changes its name to the Pawhuska Council (#482), which merged with the Cherokee Area Council (#469) in 1928.

In 1927, the Northeastern Oklahoma Council (#566) was founded. It merged with the Cherokee Area Council (#469) in 1929.

The Cherokee Area Council (#469) was founded in 1925.

The Stillwater Council was founded in 1916. It merged into Cimarron Valley Council (#473) in 1922.

The Creek County Council was founded in 1922. It merged into Cimarron Valley Council (#473) in 1922.

The Cimarron Valley Area Council (#473) was founded in 1922. It merged in to the Will Rogers Council (#473) in 1948.

The Ponca City Council (#483) was founded in 1921, changing its name to the Noble-Kay Counties Council (#483) in 1926. Noble-Kay Counties changed its name to the Northern Oklahoma Council (#483) in 1929. Northern Oklahoma changed its name to the Ponca Area Council (#483) in 1931. Ponca Area changed its name to the Northern Oklahoma Council (#483) in 1936. The Northern Oklahoma Council (#483) merged into the Will Rogers Council (#473) in 1948.

The Will Rogers Council (#473) was founded in 1948. It merged in to the Cimarron Council (#473) in 2000.

The Northwest Oklahoma Council (#570) was founded in 1927. It merged in to the Great Salt Plains Council (#474) in 1928.

The Great Salt Plains Council (#474) was founded in 1927. It merged in to the Cimarron Council (#473) in 2000.

The Enid Council was founded in 1921. It changed its name to the Garfield County Council (#474) in 1923.

The Shawnee Council (#485) was founded in 1919. It changed its name to the Pottawatomie Rogers Council (#485) in 1922. It changed its name to the Canadian Valley Council (#485) in 1927.

The Jackson County Council was founded in 1920. It changed its name to the Navajo Mountain Area Council (#476) in 1925.

The Chickasha Council (#471) was founded in 1918. It changed its name to the Grady County Area Council (#471) in 1926. The Grady County Council (#471) merged into the Black Beaver Council (#471) in 1930.

The Stephens County Council (#487) was founded in 1921. It changed its name to the Jefferson-Stephens Area Council (#487) in 1924. Jefferson-Stephens Area changed its name in 1930 to the Je-Ste-Co Council (#487). Je-Ste-Co merged into Black Beaver Council (#472) in 1932.

The Comanche County Council (#472) was founded in 1922. It changed its name to the Black Beaver Area Council (#472) in 1925. The Black Beaver Area Council (#472) merged into the Navajo Mountain Area Council (#476) in 1927.

In 1925, the Navajo Mountain Area Council (#476) was founded. It merged into the Black Beaver Council (#471) in 1930.

In 1917, the Oklahoma City Council (#480) was founded.

In 1920, the Norman Council (#479) was founded. It merged into the Oklahoma City Council (#480) in 1927.

In 1928, the Oklahoma City Council (#480) merged into the Oklahoma County Council (#480).

In 1927, the Ca-Bla-Ki Council (#475) was founded. It merged into the Oklahoma County Council (#480) in 1928.

In 1927, the Washita Valley Council (#470) was founded. It merged into the Oklahoma County Council (#480) in 1933.

In 1927, the Canadian Valley Council (#485) was founded. It merged into the Last Frontier Council (#480) in 1947.

In 1930, the Oklahoma County Council (#480) changed its name to Central Oklahoma Council (#480). It merged into the Last Frontier Council (#480) in 1939.

In 1939, the Last Frontier Council (#480) was founded.

In 1911, the Tulsa Council (#488) was founded. It changed its name to the Tulsa County Council (#488) in 1922 after adding the remainder of Tulsa County. It changed its name to the Tulsa Area Council (#488) in 1936 after adding Rogers and Mayes Counties. It changed its name to the Indian Nations Council (#488) in 1957 after merging with the Creek Nations Council.

In 1920, the Pittsburg County Council (#477) was founded. It changed its name to the McAlester Council (#477) in 1921.

In 1920, the Sapulpa Council (#486) was founded. It changed its name to the Creek County Council (#486) in 1925.

In 1920, the Drumright Council was founded. It merged into the Creek County Council (#486) in 1922.

In 1927, the Creek County Council (#486) was founded. It merged into Creek Nation Area Council (#481) in 1928.

The Creek Nation Council (#481) was founded in 1928. It merged with the Indian Nations Council (#488) in 1957.

In 1922, the South Creek County Council (#470) was founded. It changed its name to the Bristow Council (#488) in 1923. It merged into the Okmulgee Council (#481) in 1927.

In 1919, the Okmulgee Council (#481) was founded. It changed its name to the Okmulgee County Council (#481) in 1927.

In 1921, the McAlester Council (#477) was founded. It changed its name to the Choctaw Area Council (#486) in 1926.

In 1917, the Muskogee Council (#478) was founded. It changed its name to the Muskogee Area Council (#478) in 1927. It changed its name to the Eastern Oklahoma Area Council (#478) in 1949.

The Choctaw Area Council (#477) was founded in 1926. It merged with the Indian Nations Council (#488) in 1971.

In 1928, the Tex-Okla Council (#489) was founded and merged into the Adobe Walls Council (#569) in 1931.

== Recent history (1950–present) ==
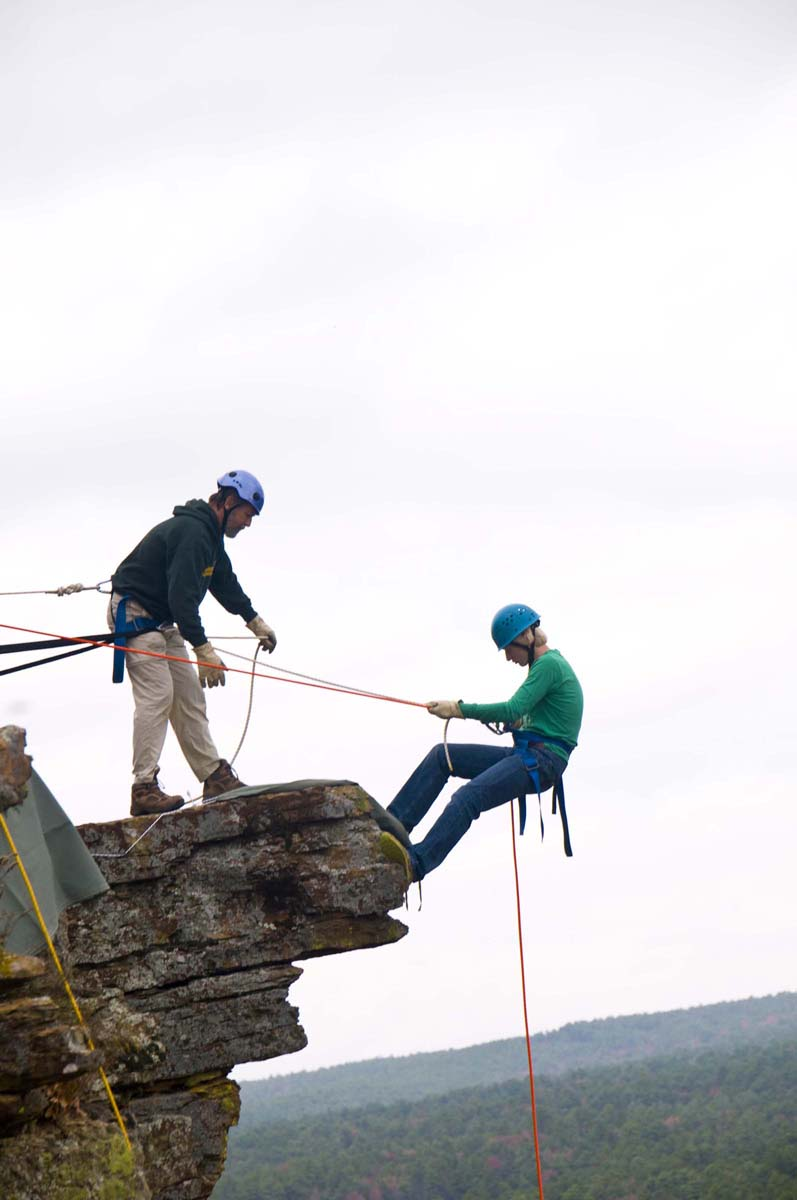
Scouts at Robber's Cave State Park

The Eastern Oklahoma Area Council (#478) was founded in 1949. It merged with the Indian Nations Council (#488) in 1983.

The Indian Nations Council (#488) was founded in 1957.

The Cimarron Council (#473) was founded in 2000 from the merger of the Will Rogers Council (#473) and the Great Salt Plains Council (#474).

The Black Beaver Council, founded in 1930, merged into the Last Frontier Council (#480) in 1996.

The Cimarron Council (#473), founded in 2000, merged into the Last Frontier Council (#480) operationally on February 1st, 2025, and legally and formally on May 1st, 2025.

== Scouting in Oklahoma today ==
=== Boy Scouts of America ===
There are six Boy Scouts of America (BSA) local councils based in, or providing services within, the state of Oklahoma. All councils in Oklahoma are part of Council Service Territory 8.

==== Arbuckle Area Council #468 ====
Arbuckle Area Council
- Owner: Boy Scouts of America
- Headquarters: Ardmore, Oklahoma
- Country: United States
- Founded: 2005
- Website arbucklebsa.org

The Boy Scouts of America Arbuckle Area Council maintains offices in Ardmore, Oklahoma, and serves youth and their families in Pontotoc, Murray, Johnston, Garvin, Coal, Atoka, Carter, Love and Marshall counties in southern Oklahoma and the city of Ringling. The Arbuckle Area Council provides a web presence for its membership and other interested persons.

===== Districts =====
- Chickasaw District covers Carter, Love, Marshall, Johnston counties and the city of Ringling
- Harry Miller District covers Pontotoc, Atoka, and Coal counties.
- Washita District covers Murray and Garvin counties.

===== Camps =====
Camp Simpson, southern Oklahoma's "slice of heaven." Home to Summer Camp and Winter Camp activities. Also available for year-round reservations. Motel room rentals, proms, weddings, family reunions, youth camps, church retreats, school outings.

===== Order of the Arrow =====
- Wisawanik Lodge #190

==== Cherokee Area Council #469 ====
Cherokee Area Council (#469)
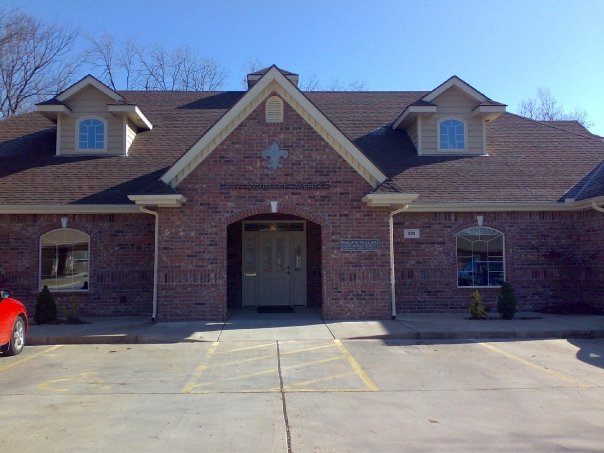
- Cherokee Area Council Headquarters
- Owner: Boy Scouts of America
- Headquarters: Bartlesville, Oklahoma
- Country: United States
- Founded: 1925
- Website cherokeebsa.org

The Boy Scouts of America Cherokee Area Council maintains an office in Bartlesville, Oklahoma, and serves youth and their families in northeastern Oklahoma. The Council provides a web presence for its membership and other interested persons. Communities served by the council include Pawhuska, Bartlesville, Nowata, Vinita, Grove, Miami, and many others in six northeastern counties of Oklahoma.

===== Districts =====
- Grand Lake District
- Osage Hills District

===== Camps =====
- Camp McClintock - Outside of Bartlesville, Oklahoma

===== Order of the Arrow =====
- Washita Lodge #288

==== Circle Ten Council #571 ====
The Circle Ten Council serves youth in North Central Texas and the Southeast Oklahoma counties of Bryan, McCurtain, Choctaw, and the southern three quarters of Pushmataha. Bryan County falls under the Texoma Valley District of the Council.

==== Golden Spread Council #562 ====
The Golden Spread Council serves Scouts in Texas and the Oklahoma Panhandle counties of Cimarron, Texas, and western half of Beaver. The Oklahoma counties fall in the Lone Wolf District.

==== Indian Nations Council #488 ====
Indian Nations Council
- Owner: Boy Scouts of America
- Headquarters: Tulsa, Oklahoma
- Country: United States
- Founded: 1911
- Website okscouts.org

The Indian Nations Council maintains offices in Tulsa and serves most of eastern Oklahoma. The Indian Nations Council provides a web presence for its membership and other interested persons.

The Council Scout Executive is Art Hawkins, who has held the position since 1 November 2021.

===== Districts =====
- Redbud District
- Scissortail District
- Will Rogers District

===== Camp Properties =====
- Mabee Scout Reservation, Locust Grove
- Jack Graves Scout Reservation, Broken Arrow
- Hale Scout Reservation, Talihina
- Zink Scout Ranch (ZBASE + Cubworld), Sand Springs
- Cherokee Nation Scout Ranch (Camp Fred Darby), Welling

===== Order of the Arrow =====
Ta Tsu Hwa Lodge
- Owner: Indian Nations Council
- Headquarters: Tulsa, Oklahoma
- Country: United States
- Founded: 1938
- Website tatsuhwa.org

The Ta Tsu Hwa Lodge (#138) was formed in 1938 under the name of "Yaqui". In 1957 Yaqui Lodge merged with the Checote Lodge (#154) due to the merger of the Tulsa Area Council and the Creek Nation Council, creating the Indian Nations Council. The new lodge was named the "Daw Zu" Lodge (#138). In 1959 the lodge was renamed "Ta Tsu Hwa," meaning "Red Bird". Between 1959 and the present day, the Lodge absorbed the "Oskihoma" Lodge (#320) and the "Ni-U-Kon-Ska" Lodge (#328) as the Indian Nations Council absorbed the Choctaw Area Council and the Eastern Oklahoma Council.

The distinctive "Red Bird" lodge flap of the Ta Tsu Hwa Lodge is shaped differently than the standard pocket flap.

==== Last Frontier Council #480 ====
Last Frontier Council
- Owner: Boy Scouts of America
- Headquarters: Oklahoma City, Oklahoma
- Location: Central, Western, and Southwestern Oklahoma
- Country: United States
- Founded: 1913
- Membership: 11,000
- Scout Executive: Jeff Woolsey
- Council President: Bob Spinks
- Council Commissioner: Rory Barneche
- Website scoutingrocks.tv

The Last Frontier Council operates ten camps and is based in three service centers which are located in Enid, Lawton and Oklahoma City. Last Frontier Council supports its volunteer leaders, who deliver Scouting in all or parts of 42 counties in central, north-central, western and southwestern Oklahoma.

===== Districts =====
The 101 District geographic territory covers the northern Oklahoma counties of Grant and Kay as well as a portion of Osage County.

Big Tepee District serves Scouts in Midwest City, Del City, Tinker AFB, Choctaw, Nicoma Park, Harrah, and South Oklahoma City.

Black Beaver District serves Scouts in Comanche, Cotton, Caddo, Grady, Stephens, Jefferson, Jackson, Tillman, Kiowa, Greer, and Harmon Counties.

The Black Kettle District serves Scouts in the Northwestern Oklahoma counties of Grant, Alfalfa, Major, Blaine, Dewey, Ellis, Woodward, Harper, Woods Counties.

Canadian Valley District serves Scouts in Pottawatomie, Seminole, Hughes, and Southern Lincoln Counties.

Chisholm Trail District serves Scouts in Kingfisher and Garfield Counties.

Eagle District serves Scouts in the communities of Edmond, Deer Creek, Luther, Jones, Wellston, and Logan County.

The Pawnee Bill District geographic territory covers the north-central Oklahoma counties of Noble, Payne, Pawnee, and Lincoln, as well as a portion of Creek County. The district is named in honor of Pawnee Bill and has retained its name through the mergers of the Will Rogers Council into the Cimarron Council and subsequently into the Last Frontier Council. Before Will Rogers Council, the areas the district serves were originally a council of its own, known as the Cimarron Valley Council until 1948. The Pawnee Bill District contains the historic 340-acre Will Rogers Scout Reservation within its boundaries.

Scissortail District serves Scouts across the North, South, and Northeast regions, including Spencer, Downtown OKC, Forest Park, Bethany, Warr Acres, Putnam City, and West OKC.

The Sooner District serves Scouts in Cleveland & McClain counties in southern Oklahoma.

The Western Plains District serves Scouts in Roger Mills, Beckham, Washita & Custer Counties along with the communities of Hydro, Hinton & Binger in Caddo County.

The Will Rogers District serves Scouts in Canadian County as well as the Geary, Minco, Tuttle, and Bridge Creek communities.

===== Camps =====
- Diamond H Scout Ranch 35.677936°N 94.913721°W

Located near Lake Tenkiller, the Diamond H Scout Ranch is located in eastern Oklahoma. Diamond H is the largest property in the Last Frontier Council. The camp property is currently undeveloped and restricted in use. Only primitive, weekend camping is presently available. Advanced reservations are required to visit the property.

- Dripping Springs 35.6869°N 98.9075°W

Camp Dripping Springs is an 80-acre (320,000 m^{2}) property in western Oklahoma. The camp setting offers the opportunity for Scouts to practice tracking, track casting, star study, compass work, fishing, or tree identification.

- George Thomas 34.90028°N 98.49917°W

Camp George Thomas is located at the foot of the Wichita Mountains in Caddo County off State Highway 19. The camp is used for general unit camping by packs, troops, teams, crews and ships, for training courses, numerous district and council events, Cub — Webelos Scout Resident Camp, and the council's Cub-Webelos Fall Family Adventure (family weekend camping) opportunities each fall.

- John Nichols Scout Ranch 35.3501°N 97.6724°W

John Nichols Scout Ranch, John Nichols Scout Ranch maintained since 1932, is the oldest camp property within the council. Located on the southwest edge of Oklahoma City at SW 119th and County Line Road, John Nichols Scout Ranch is available year-round to Scout groups for overnight campouts, weekend campouts, and various training opportunities. Kickapoo serves as the host location for several day camp weeks each summer and for the Kickapoo Kampers Family Overnight Adventures each fall. The council voted to sell JNSR in January 2026, and will cease operations there in September 2026. Verna

- Kerr Scout Ranch at Slippery Falls 34.3108°N 96.7223°W

Kerr Scout Ranch at Slippery Falls (KSR@SF) is located near Tishomingo, Oklahoma. 'Slip' is the most developed of the six camping properties in the council. KSR@SF is the summer camp facility in the council for Boy Scouts and Venturers.

- Sasakwa 34.9275°N 96.4514°W

Camp Sasakwa is situated near Holdenville, Oklahoma. The property is used for primitive, short-term camping only, offering a low-impact, high adventure setting. Advance reservations are required and all supplies and water must be carried in and all refuse must be carried out.

- Will Rogers Scout Reservation 36.29056°N 96.53750°W

The Will Rogers Scout Reservation has been a Scouting property since the 1930s when it was called Camp Cee Vee Cee. Named for Will Rogers, one of Oklahoma's favorite sons, it consists of approximately 340 acres (1.4 km^{2}) of small hills of oak and hickory forest with its northern boundary being bluffs. The camp features a centralized dining hall with regional shower facilities and program areas. There are archery, shotgun, and rifle ranges, a boat dock and pond, swimming pool, a central bath house, and several camping areas. It is located near Cleveland, Oklahoma.

- Williams Scout Reservation 36.33805556°N 98.40472222°W

Camp Williams consists of 145 acres (59 ha) with a small lake, a swimming pool, a southwestern adobe style mess hall, a trading post, a water front for boating activities, camp office, ranger cabin, and 11 well shaded camp sites. It is located near Cleo Springs and Fairview.

===== Order of the Arrow =====
Southern Prairie Lodge No. 14
- Location: Oklahoma City, Oklahoma
- Membership: about 700
- Lodge Chief: Daeten Snelson and Saxon Shepard
- Lodge Adviser: E.Z. Parnell
- Staff Adviser: Chip Armishaw
- Website http://www.southernprairie.org

Southern Prairie Lodge No. 14 is the Order of the Arrow lodge corresponding to Last Frontier Council. It was formed on August 2, 2025 as the result of a merger between Ma-Nu Lodge No. 133 and Ema 'O Mahpe Lodge No. 14.

Ma-Nu Lodge No. 133 was originally chartered to the Central Oklahoma Area Council, Region 9 on August 20, 1938. One year later the Central Oklahoma Area Council rechartered as Last Frontier Council. This makes Ma-Nu Lodge one year older than Last Frontier Council. Over the next few decades there would be several mergers and reorganizations within the structure of both the Lodge and the Council.

As the area of the lodge expanded, the lodge began to need another form of organization. In 1963, Ma-Nu lodge set up Chapters with borders corresponding to the districts established by the Council. In 1950, Canadian Valley Council merged with Last Frontier Council and Shawnee Lodge 192 became part of Ma-Nu Lodge 133. Again in 1996 Black Beaver Council merged with Last Frontier Council and two years later Sekettummaqua Lodge 281 completed its merger with Ma-Nu bringing the number of members to near 1700 and the total number of Chapters to ten.

Although the literal translation of Ma-Nu is White Buffalo, the Osage word for white also meant Spirit, so Ma-Nu means Spirit Buffalo.

Today, Ma-Nu Lodge has experienced a myriad of growth and development and continues to tweak its organizational structure to better meet the demands of today's program. There are currently seven Lodge Officers: The Lodge Chief; The Lodge Vice Chief of Program; The Lodge Vice Chief of Activities; The Lodge Vice Chief of Chapters; The Lodge Vice Chief of Inductions, The Lodge Vice Chief of Finance, The Lodge Vice Chief of Administration. There are also numerous Associate Lodge Advisers.

Ema 'O Mahpe Lodge No. 14 was founded on April 1, 2001, from the merger of Ah-Ska Lodge No. 213 (the White Elk) and Inola Lodge No. 148 (the Thunderbird). Ema 'O Mahpe is said to mean "Red Water" or "Red River", in reference to the Cimarron River which flows through the former Lodge and served as the namesake of Ema 'O Mahpe's council, Cimarron Council. The lodge totem of Ema 'O Mahpe was the coyote. Today, Ema 'O Mahpe is led by its Lodge Chief, with a Lodge Vice Chief, Lodge Secretary, Lodge Treasurer, and seven Lodge Chief–appointed committee chairs all helping run the Lodge's operations. The Lodge officers are assisted by the Lodge Adviser, two Associate Lodge Advisers, and other position-specific advisers. As of August 2025, the Lodge had 103 registered members across three active chapters.

Location: Oklahoma City, Oklahoma Lodge Totem: the American Bison Founding Date: August 2, 2025 Current Active Membership: approximately 700

=== Girl Scouting in Oklahoma ===
Girl Scouting in Oklahoma
- Map of Girl Scout Councils in Oklahoma

There are five Girl Scout councils in Oklahoma.

==== Girl Scouts - Diamonds of Arkansas, Oklahoma and Texas ====
In Oklahoma serves girls in Adair, LeFlore, and Sequoyah counties.

==== Girl Scouts Missouri Heartland ====
Serves girls in two northeastern Oklahoma counties.

==== Girl Scouts of Texas Oklahoma Plains ====
Serves girls in the Oklahoma panhandle.

==== Girl Scouts of Eastern Oklahoma ====
Girl Scouts of Eastern Oklahoma
- Owner: Girl Scouts of the United States of America
- Headquarters: Tulsa, Oklahoma
- Country: United States
- Founded: 1911
- Website www.gseok.org

Girl Scouts of Eastern Oklahoma serves 15,000 girls and adult volunteers in thirty eastern Oklahoma counties. The first troop in Tulsa was in 1917 and the first council in 1923. The earliest known sale of cookies by an individual Girl Scouts unit in the United States was by the Mistletoe Troop in Muskogee, Oklahoma in December 1917 at their local high school. The current council was formed on June 1, 2008 with the merger of Bluestem, Tiak, and Magic Empire councils.

===== Service centers =====
- Bartlesville, OK
- McAlester, OK
- Muskogee, OK
- Stillwater, OK
- Ada, OK

===== Camps =====
- Camp Tallchief is north of Sand Springs, OK and on the John Zink Scout Ranch
- Camp Swannie is north of Sand Springs, OK and next to Camp Tallchief
- Camp Wah-Shah-She is 524 acres (2.12 km^{2}) west of Bartlesville, OK.

===== Scout houses =====
- Eaton Lodge is in Cushing, OK
- The Troop House in Tulsa

==== Girl Scouts - Western Oklahoma ====
Girl Scouts - Western Oklahoma
- Owner: Girl Scouts of the United States of America
- Headquarters: Oklahoma City, Oklahoma
- Country: United States
- Founded: 1911
- Website gswestok.org

Girl Scouts-Western Oklahoma serves girls in 39 western Oklahoma counties. It was formed by the merger of Red Lands and Sooner Councils in March 2008.

===== Camps =====
- Camp E-Ko-Wah near Marlow, OK
- Camp Trivera in Oklahoma City, OK

== Scouting museums in Oklahoma ==
- Osage County Historical Museum
