= Circle Ten Council =

Boy Scouts of America chartered council

- Owner: Scouting America
- Headquarters: 8605 Harry Hines Boulevard; Dallas, Texas 75247
- Location: Texas, Oklahoma
- Country: United States
- Founded: 1913
- Membership: 32,000 youth (2024); 8,600 adults (2024)
- President: Joe Stallard
- Council Commissioner: Gary Scott
- Scout Executive: Dr. Scotty Landry
- Website http://www.CircleTen.org/

Circle Ten Council is a Scouting America chartered council in central north Texas and a portion of Oklahoma. It encompasses all or parts of: Camp, Collin, Dallas, Delta, Ellis, Fannin, Franklin, Grayson, Henderson, Hopkins, Hunt, Kaufman, Lamar, Morris, Navarro, Rains, Red River, Rockwall, Titus, and Van Zandt counties in Texas as well as Bryan, Choctaw, McCurtain, and Pushmataha counties in Oklahoma. Founded in 1913 and based in Dallas, approximately 25,000 youth and 7,000 adults (as of 2026) participate in Scouting through the council each year. The council has four camps - Camp Wisdom, Camp James Ray, Clements Scout Ranch/Trevor Rees-Jones Scout Camp and Camp Constantin/Jack D. Furst Aquatics Base. The Order of the Arrow is represented by Mikanakawa Lodge.

== History ==
The Scouting movement came to Dallas in 1910, the same year the BSA was created in the United States, and by 1913 several troops were already in existence. In 1923 the council came into possession of its first camp. Donated by John S. Wisdom, also known as "Daddy Wisdom", to support the council he gave his farm as a permanent campsite. Since Wisdom's generous act, Circle Ten has acquired three more major camps: Constantin, James Ray, and Cherokee. J.L. Tarr, the Scout Executive of Circle Ten became Chief Scout Executive in 1979. In 1996 Circle 10 moved into its new home, The John D. Murchison Service Center, named after the National BSA President and Dallas area businessman/philanthropist who died in 1979 during the first year of his term.

== Organization ==
The council is administratively organized into districts:

Central Service Area

Northern Trail – Richardson, Lake Highlands

Heart of Dallas – East Dallas, Highland Park, University Park, West Dallas, Fair Park, Lindsey Park

Duck Creek – Garland, Sachse, Rowlett

East Trinity Trails – Wylie ISD, Rockwall County, Community ISD

Rising Sun – Mesquite, Sunnyvale, Balch Springs, Seagoville, Pleasant Grove & South East Dallas

North Service Area

Chisholm Trail – Plano

Eagle Trail – Allen, Fairview, Lucas

Iron Horse – Frisco, Prosper, Celina

Lone Star – McKinney, Anna, Farmersville, Melissa, Princeton

Eastern Lakes - Hunt, Rains, Hopkins, Delta, Red River, Titus, Camp, Morris, Franklin Counties

Texoma Valley - Grayson & Bryan Counties

Two Rivers – Fannin, Lamar, Pushmataha, Choctaw, McCurtain

South Service Area

Post Oak - Kaufman, Van Zandt, Navarro, Henderson Counties (not including Forney ISD)

Elm Fork – Carrollton, Southern Lewisville, East Coppell, Northwest Dallas, Irving, Addison, North Dallas

Soaring Eagle – Duncanville, DeSoto, Lancaster, Cedar Hill, Wilmer, Hutchins, Oak Cliff

Southern Star – Ellis County

Western Horizon – Irving, Coppell, Grand Prairie

Scout Reach Service Area

Program Specialist Units

== Camps ==
=== Camp Constantin ===
Camp Constantin
- Location: 3003 Park Road 36; Graford, TX 76449
- Coordinates: 32.866667°N 98.433333°W
- Founded: 1946
- Ranger: Collin Anderson

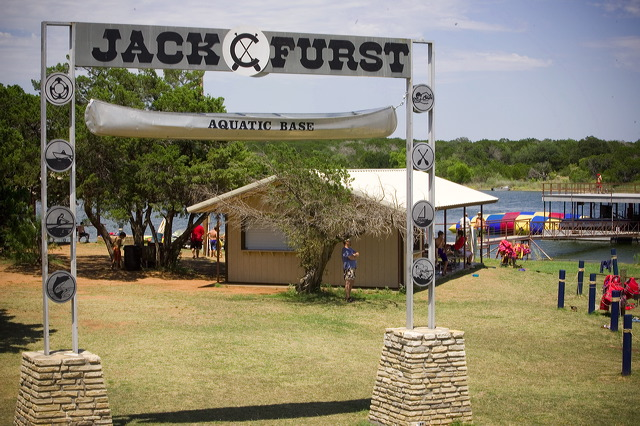
Constantin Aquatics area

Camp Constantin is the flagship campground for Circle Ten. Located on 385 acres (1.6 km^{2}) on the shores of Possum Kingdom Lake near Graford, Texas and containing 15 campsites, Constantin acts as both a regular camp open to Scouts from all areas and as Circle Ten's largest and longest-running summer camp hosting roughly 2,800 Scouts during the 5 weeks it is open during the summer. Constantin was acquired by the Boy Scouts in 1946 when Eugene Constantin donated it, after the death of his son in World War II, to the group that he decided best served the needs, morals, and values of young men. The camp recently celebrated its 80th birthday.

==== Jack D. Furst Aquatics Base ====
Within Camp Constantin is an Aquatics Base that was established by a generous donation from Circle Ten board member and former Constantin staff member Jack D. Furst. The Aquatics area is the best maintained and most used Aquatics area within Circle Ten Council and one of the best in Texas. The Aquatics Base features a fleet of sailboats (consisting mainly of Sunfish and Hobie Cats), dozens of newly donated canoes, 5 ski boats, a two-year-old state-of-the-art swim dock, and a boat dock. Another popular feature are the "Blob" set out every summer. Because of Fursts' generosity and the area upkeep by staff members, it is able to offer the Swimming, Rowing & Canoeing, Motorboating, Lifesaving, Kayaking, Sailing & Advanced Sailing, and Waterskiing merit badges as well as Lifeguard training. Its Water Odyssey program is unique to the camp and is designed solely for Eagle Scouts.

=== James Ray Scout Reservation ===
James Ray Scout Reservation
- Location: 2026 Mill Creek Road; Pottsboro, TX 75076
- Founded: 1926 (as Camp Texoma); 2000 (current name)
- Lead Ranger: Heath Spindle

James Ray Scout Reservation, formerly known as Camp Grayson (1930–1999), is located on the Texas side of Lake Texoma, near Pottsboro, occupying 540 acres (2.2 km^{2}). Like Constantin, James Ray is a year-round camp and a summer camp. During the summer months, James Ray utilizes its 11 campsites and is in operation for 4 weeks for Webelos resident camp. During the 2005 summer, James Ray suffered a setback when a refrigerator fire damaged its electrical system. Some dedicated Circle Ten volunteers repaired the electrical system, which was back in operation within 48 hours. James Ray is home to the Sanford Aquatics Area which contains a 180,000 gallon, one-of-a-kind swimming pool. In and surrounding the pool is a beach-front entrance, two aqua jet systems, and a 141-foot (43 m) water slide.

=== Camp Wisdom ===
Camp Wisdom
- Location: 6400 W. Red Bird Lane; Dallas, TX 75236
- Founded: 1923
- Lead Ranger: Jay Hummel
- Ranger: Nicholas Kinney

Camp Wisdom is Circle Ten Council's original camp. Donated in 1923 by farmer John S. Wisdom, still known by his nickname "Daddy Wisdom", Camp Wisdom started at about 300 acres (1.2 km^{2}). At one point, the camp grew to almost 1,000 acres (4.0 km^{2}) through land donations.

Some of the original camp was purchased by Texas for the construction of Interstate 20. Since then, Wisdom has returned to much of its original size.

Wisdom is known for Cub World, Circle Ten's primary Cub leader training site and Cub Scout campground. In addition to its 40 campsites, Wisdom also hosts leadership training for adults and youth owing, in part, to the easy access from the Dallas metropolitan area. The camp lends its name to Camp Wisdom Road, a major east–west road near the camp.

Gill Clements Shooting Sports Complex (opened May 2017) is the premier shooting range in Circle Ten and includes: 50-yard rifle range 5-stand shotgun range, 5 position shotgun game with multiple targets 2-stand shotgun range for merit badge instructional range Shooting sports building with air-conditioned/heated classroom and secure storage Onsite bathrooms

Camp Wisdom has an unfortunate reputation of being noisy at all times due to proximity to two highways: Interstate 20 and Texas Spur 408. Also, lighted highway billboards shine into some campsites.

=== Clements Scout Ranch ===
Clements Scout Ranch
- Location: 11217 FM 2970; Athens, TX 75751
- Lead Ranger: █████
- Ranger: █████
- Seasonal Ranger Emeritus: A. Truax

Clements Scout Ranch houses two Boy Scout camps, Trevor Rees-Jones Scout Camp and Camp Meisenbach. Named after former Texas Governor Bill Clements, a lifelong supporter of the BSA, the ranch comprises 3,300 acres (13 km^{2}) of towering pines and four well-stocked fishing lakes.

==== Trevor Rees-Jones Scout Camp ====
Trevor Rees-Jones Scout Camp (formerly Camp Cherokee), located near Athens, Texas, has sixteen campsites for weekend and week-long summer camp visitors. TRJ hosts one of two COPE courses in the council, features a 48 ft (15 m) climbing tower and has Circle 10's only ATV course. The summer program also offers more than 60 merit badges, programs, and activities for Scouts and Scouters alike. TRJ's biggest draw is the horsemanship program, the only place within the Circle Ten Council to obtain the Horsemanship merit badge. In June 2008, Camp Cherokee opened the Jim Tarr Dining Hall, a 14,000 sq ft (1,300 m^{2}) air-conditioned facility that also features a state-of-the-art kitchen and a Scoutmaster's lounge.

Another unique offering is the annual Winter Camp held there every winter from December 27 to 31. Like a summer camp, campers have the chance to earn merit badges, but unlike Summer Camp, campers must provide their own food. Mikanakawa Lodge staffs Winter Camp every year, presenting various Native American themed events such as Pow wow's to campers and visitors in addition to performing the normal duties of camp staffers.

==== Camp Meisenbach ====
Camp Meisenbach (formerly Camp Comanche) is the smaller of the two camps located on Clements Scout Ranch and is used exclusively for year-round primitive camping. Meisenbach features six campsites with two pavilions. Located on Murchison Lake, Meisenbach offers great fishing and canoeing programs. Camp Meisenbach currently has 13 miles (21 km) of hiking trails and three additional Philmont style campsites. Clements Scout Ranch is also very proud to host the "Governor's Trail", which has recently been renovated with a service grant from the National Order of the Arrow lodge along with the Ft. Bridger Trail.

== Order of the Arrow ==
Mikanakawa Lodge
- Founded: 1937
- Founder: L. L.Hotchkiss
- Membership: over 3,000
- Lodge Chief: Gabriel K.
- Lodge Adviser: Chuck Ashby
- Staff Adviser: Ryan Downey
- Lodge Number: 101
- Website http://www.miki.org Mikanakawa Lodge

Mikanakawa Lodge is the local extension of the Order of the Arrow within Circle Ten. It was founded in 1937 by L. L. Hotchkiss after Scouts from Circle Ten Council returned from the 1937 National Scout Jamboree. On April 26 Hotchkiss, himself a distinguished Arrowman, mailed a letter to the National OA Secretary about starting a Lodge. On June 22, final approval for the lodge was given and within seven days of the letter, the first Ordeal was held at Camp Wisdom. The lodge gained its name when the Mikanakawa Tribe, a group of Scouts acting outside of the Order of the Arrow but with similar activities, was merged by Circle Ten into the official Order of the Arrow lodge and allowed to keep the name Mikanakawa. The Lodge lacked the traditional "patch flap" until 1950 when it was designed by Bill Jordan in preparation for a trip to a National meeting. In 1994 the Mikanakawa Lodge welcomed the Okiciyapi Lodge upon the Texoma Valley Council merging with Circle Ten Council. Okiciyapi became a chapter as Texoma Valley Council became a district, Mikanakawa elected to adopt the Okiciyapi Thunderowl totem alongside its Owl in a show of unity. This made Mikanakawa one of the few OA Lodges in the country to have two totems: the owl and the thunderbird.

The lodge holds many events, including five annual ordeals, a Native American Pow-Wow, a Fall Fellowship, an Annual Dinner, a leadership development conference, and is charged each year with organizing and staffing the council's winter camp at Camp Trevor Rees-Jones (formerly known as Camp Cherokee). The lodge also sends delegates to the annual Southern Region Section 2 Conclave and regularly sends at least 100 delegates to National Order of the Arrow Conference (NOAC)

=== Chapters ===
The lodge is administratively divided into chapters matching each district: Southwestern Service Area 1. Elm Fork - Pechan Ozate 2. Soaring Eagle - Takoda 3. Southern Star District - Alankw Shaoneyunk 4. Western Horizon - Ah-Shu-Ko

Southeastern Service Area 1. East Trinity Trails District - N'wingi 2. Duck Creek District - Atoskata 3. Texas Skies District - Soquili 4. Trinity Wood District - Cayuga

North Central Service Area 1. Rising Sun - Tlanuwa 2. Northern Trail District - Arapaho 3. Tejas Caddo District - Piscke 4. West Park District - Shawnee

North Metro Service Area 1. Chisholm Trail District - Cha’wat 2. Eagle Trail District - Haokah 3. Iron Horse District - Adanvdo Ditlihi 4. Lone Star District - Wicahpi

Northeastern Service Area 1. Texoma Valley District - Okiciyapi 2. Tonkawa District - Sachapiwak 3. Two Rivers District - Nisha Sipu 4. White Oak District - Wipunkokw

== See also ==
- Scouting in Texas
