= List of Eagle Scouts =

Eagle Scout
- Created: 1911
- Recipients: Eagle Scouts; 27,718 (2026); 2.8 million (total) Distinguished Eagle Scouts; 2,150 (total 2015)

Eagle Scout is the highest rank attainable in the Scouts BSA program of Scouting America. Since it was first awarded to Arthur Rose Eldred on August 21, 1912, Eagle Scout has been earned by more than two million youth. The list below includes notable recipients.

As of 2014, requirements include earning at least 21 merit badges and demonstrating Scout Spirit, leadership, and service. The requirements include an Eagle Scout Service Project where the Scout must further demonstrate service and leadership. Eagle Scouts are recognized with a medal and a cloth badge that visibly recognizes the accomplishments of the Scout. Eagle Palms are a further recognition, awarded for completing additional tenure, leadership, and merit badge requirements. Typically adult volunteers who have received the Eagle award as a youth wear a smaller patch depicting a square knot.

The Distinguished Eagle Scout Award (DESA) is bestowed to Eagle Scouts for nationally renowned distinguished service in their profession and to the community for a period of at least 25 years after earning the Eagle Scout rank. Since its introduction in 1969 by the National Eagle Scout Association, the DESA has been awarded to over 2,000 Eagle Scouts.^{[a]}

The NESA Outstanding Eagle Scout Award (NOESA) is bestowed to Eagle Scouts who have distinguished themselves at a local-to-regional level or who have not yet met the 25-year tenure requirement to be considered for a DESA. This award was introduced in 2011.

== Eagle Scouts ==
- Indicates recipients of the Distinguished Eagle Scout Award (DESA)
- Indicates recipients of the NESA Outstanding Eagle Scout Award (NOESA)
- † indicates deceased

=== A ===
| Name | Eagle Scout | Awards | Notability | References |
|---|---|---|---|---|
| Bruce Ableson | 1980 | | American computer programmer and website developer | |
| Gary Ackerman | 1960 c. | | Representative from New York (1983–2013) | ^{[a]} |
| James C. Adamson | 1961 | | Army colonel and astronaut who flew on shuttle missions STS-28 and STS-43 | ^{[c]} |
| Peter Aduja † | 1936 c. | | First Filipino American elected to public office in the United States. Elected as a State Representative in the Hawaii Legislature in 1954. | |
| Peter Agre | 1964 | Distinguished Eagle Scout Award | Medical doctor, professor, and molecular biologist who was awarded the 2003 Nobel Prize in Chemistry for his discovery of aquaporin; president of the American Association for the Advancement of Science | ^{[a]} |
| William Vollie Alexander Jr. | 1950 c. | | Representative from Arkansas (1969–1993) | |
| Lamar Alexander | 1954 | Distinguished Eagle Scout Award | 45th Governor of Tennessee (1979–1987); Secretary of Education (1991–1993); Senator from Tennessee (2003–2021) | ^{[a]} |
| Dana Altman | 1973 | Distinguished Eagle Scout Award | College men's basketball coach at Creighton, Kansas State, Marshall and Oregon | |
| Bill Amend | 1968 c. | | Cartoonist, best known for his comic strip FoxTrot | |
| John Edward Anderson † | 1931 | Distinguished Eagle Scout Award | Founder of Topa Equities, namesake of UCLA Anderson School of Management | ^{[a]} |
| Rudolf Anderson † | 1945 c. | | Air Force officer; first recipient of the Air Force Cross; the only person killed by enemy fire during the Cuban Missile Crisis when his U-2 spy aircraft was shot down over Cuba | |
| Phillip Andrew "Pip" Arnold | 2009 | | Singer; semi-finalist on The Glee Project; competitor on The Voice | |
| David Archuleta | 2010 | | Singer-songwriter; actor | |
| Carlos Arguelles † | 1932 | Distinguished Eagle Scout Award | Prominent Filipino architect known for being a leading proponent of the International Style of architecture in the Philippines in the 1960s | |
| Neil Armstrong † | 1947 | Distinguished Eagle Scout Award | Astronaut who flew on the Gemini 8 and Apollo 11 missions; test pilot and naval aviator; first human to set foot on the Moon | ^{[a]}^{[c]}^{[e]} |
| Gary Arndt | 1987 | | Award winning travel photographer and writer. | |
| Kenneth A. Arnold † | 1929 c. | | Aviator and businessman, known especially for early UFO sightings | |
| Alan C. Ashton | 1957 | Distinguished Eagle Scout Award | Co-founder of WordPerfect; professor at Brigham Young University | ^{[a]} |
| Marvin J. Ashton † | 1963 | Distinguished Eagle Scout Award | Member of the Quorum of the Twelve of the Church of Jesus Christ of Latter-day Saints; businessman; Utah State Senator | ^{[a]} |
| Brent F. Ashworth | 1963 | NESA Outstanding Eagle Scout Award | American-history document dealer and autograph collector | |
| Norman R. Augustine | 1952 | Distinguished Eagle Scout Award | Aerospace businessman; CEO of Martin Marietta Aerospace | ^{[a]} |
| Leslie Aulds † | 1936 c. | | Professional baseball player (Boston Red Sox 1947) and collegiate umpire. | |
| Brad Avakian | 1975 | | Commissioner of the Oregon Bureau of Labor and Industries; Oregon State Representative and Senator | |

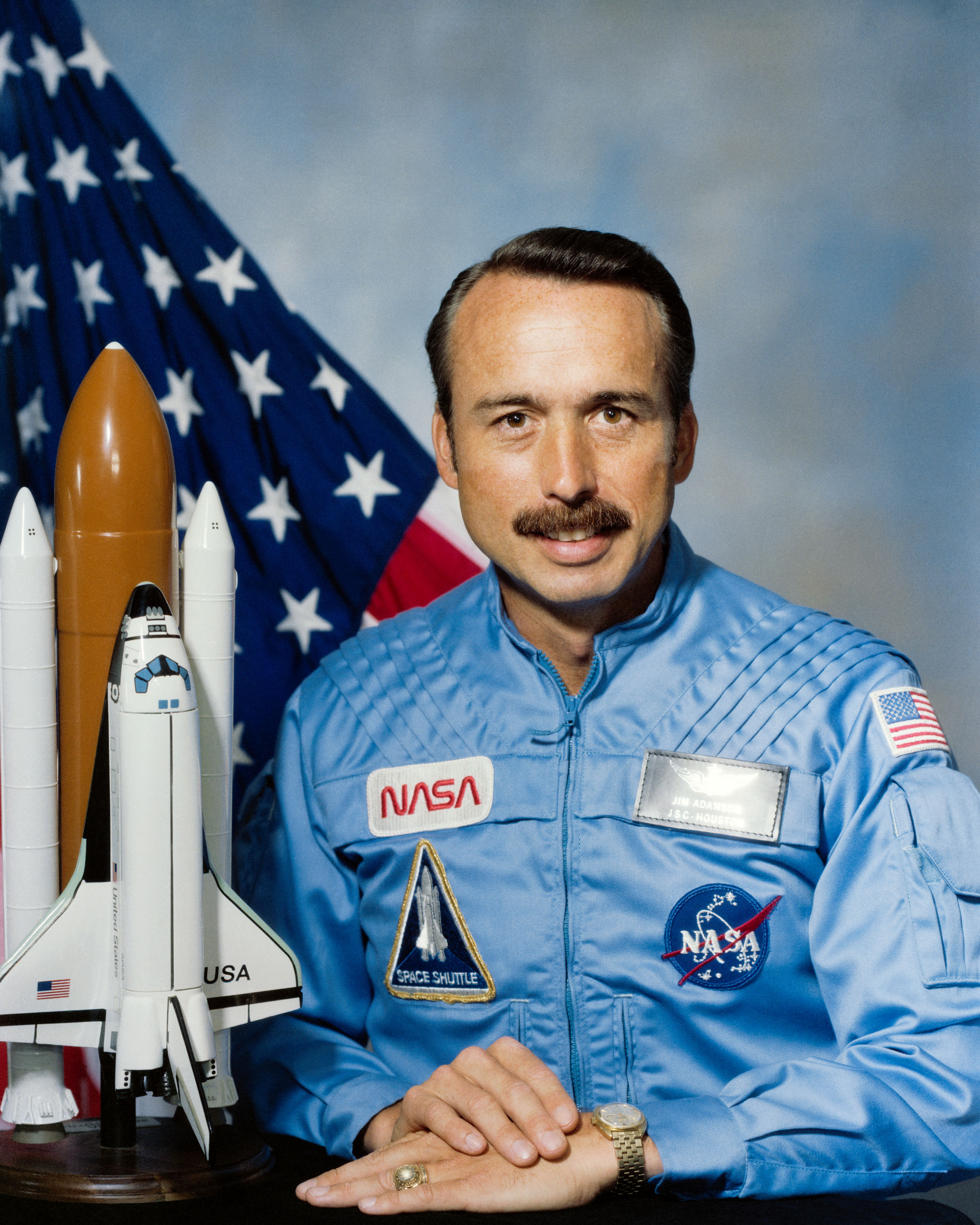
James Adamson

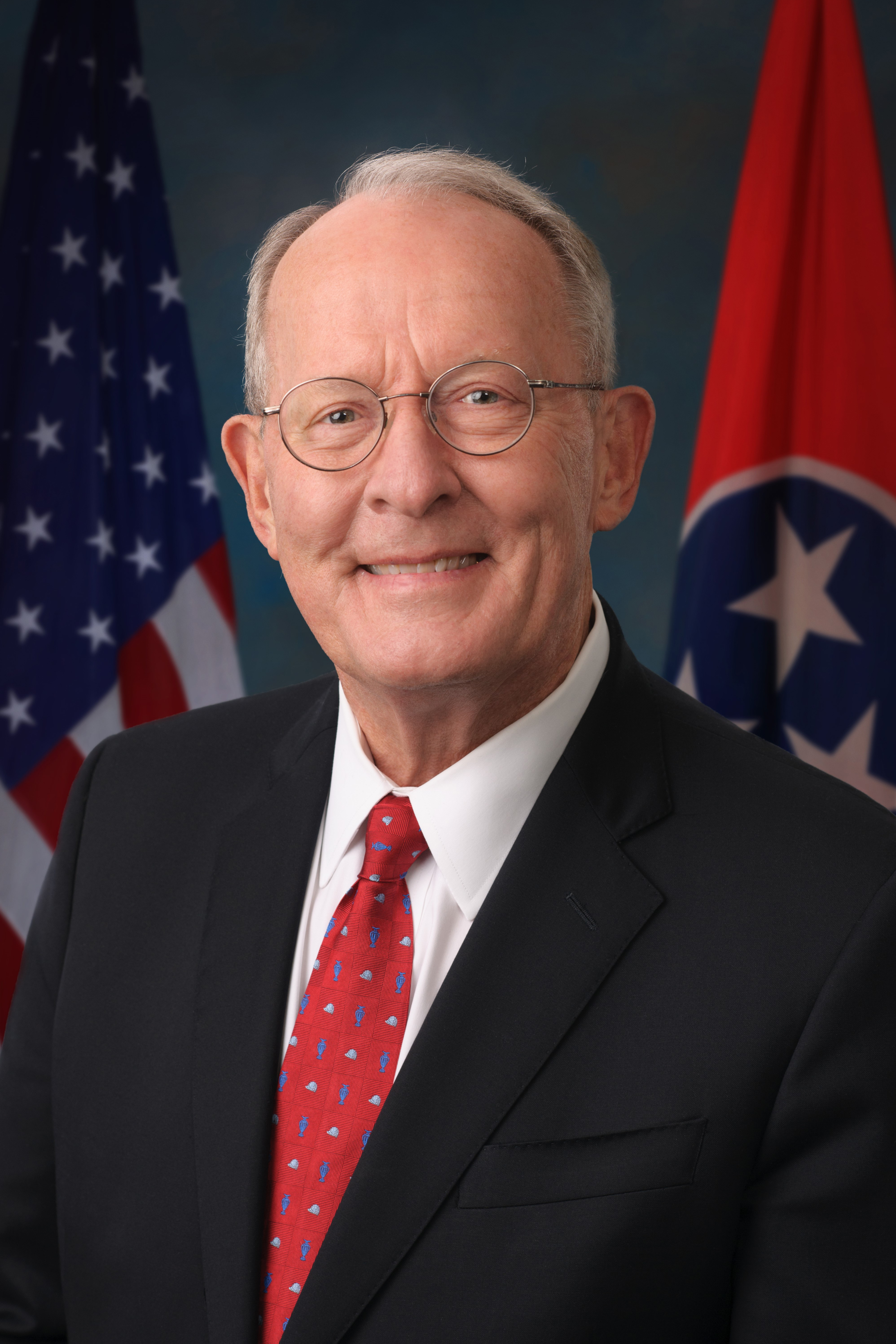
Lamar Alexander

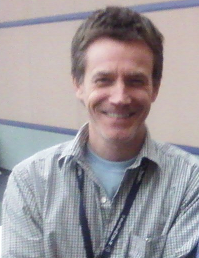
Bill Amend

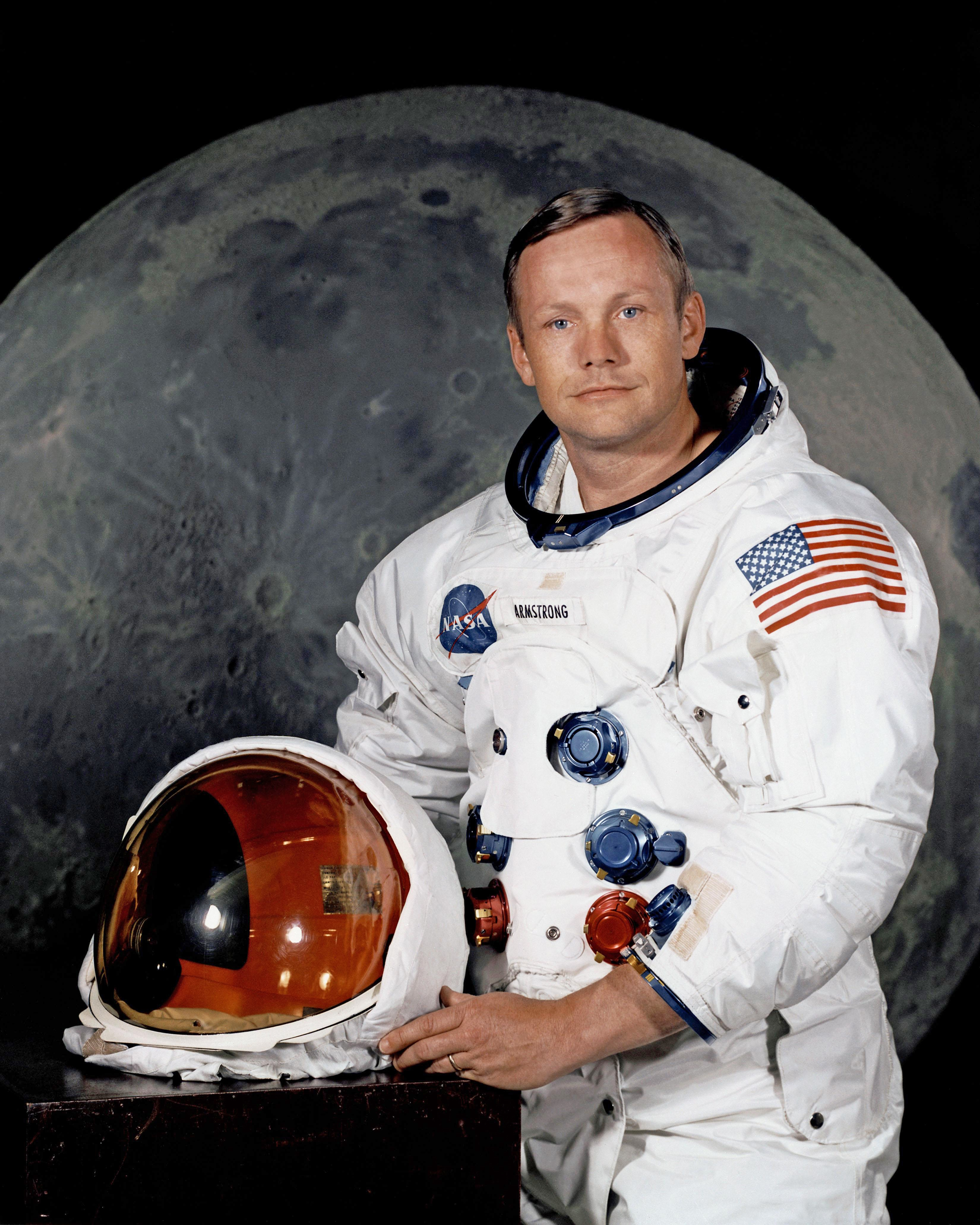
Neil Armstrong

=== B ===
| Name | Eagle Scout | Awards | Notability | References |
|---|---|---|---|---|
| Lawrence S. Bacow | 1966 | Distinguished Eagle Scout Award | President of Harvard University, President of Tufts University and Chancellor of Massachusetts Institute of Technology | ^{[a]}^{[e]} |
| David Bader | 1985 | | Georgia Tech professor | |
| James P. Bagian | 1967 | Distinguished Eagle Scout Award | Physician and astronaut who flew on shuttle missions STS-29 and STS-40 | ^{[c]} |
| Willie Banks | 1971 | | Olympic competitor and world-record-holding track star | ^{[d]} |
| Alden G. Barber † | 1933 | Distinguished Eagle Scout Award | Professional Scouter, fifth Chief Scout Executive (1967–1976) | ^{[a]} |
| Ray Barnhart † | 1944 c. | | Texas State Representative; Chairman of the Republican Party of Texas; Director of Federal Highway Administration | |
| Marion Barry † | 1954 | | Mayor of Washington, D.C. (1979–1991 and 1995–1999); Member of the Council of the District of Columbia (2000–2014) | |
| Maxie Baughan † | 1952 | NESA Outstanding Eagle Scout Award | Retired football linebacker in the National Football League for the Philadelphia Eagles, Los Angeles Rams, and the Washington Redskins | |
| Harry Brinkley Bass † | 1930 | | Navy fighter pilot killed in action over France during World War II; awarded the Navy Cross twice and the Silver Star; USS Brinkley Bass (DD-887) was named in his honor | |
| Charles E. Bayless | 1958 | Distinguished Eagle Scout Award | President of West Virginia University Institute of Technology; regional vice-president of West Virginia University | ^{[a]} |
| Daniel Carter Beard † | 1915 | | Author, illustrator, founding pioneer of the Boy Scouts of America | |
| Stephen Bechtel Jr. † | 1940 | Distinguished Eagle Scout Award | Chairman Emeritus and Director of Bechtel | ^{[a]} |
| John Beck | 1997 c. | | National Football League quarterback for the Miami Dolphins and Baltimore Ravens | |
| Emory Bellard † | 1943 c. | | Head coach at Texas A&M University from 1972 to 1978 and at Mississippi State University from 1979 until 1985 | |
| Albert Belle | 1981 | | Major League Baseball outfielder for the Cleveland Indians, Chicago White Sox, and Baltimore Orioles; first player to hit 50 doubles and 50 home runs in a single season | |
| Charles Edward Bennett † | 1925 | Distinguished Eagle Scout Award | Representative from Florida (1949–1993) | ^{[a]} |
| Steve Benson † | 1970 | | U.S. editorial cartoonist for The Arizona Republic | |
| Lloyd Bentsen † | 1938 | Distinguished Eagle Scout Award | Representative from Texas (1948–1955); Senator from Texas (1971–1993); Democratic nominee for Vice President of the United States (1988); Secretary of the Treasury (1993–1994) | ^{[a]}^{[d]} |
| Lee Rogers Berger | 1983 | Distinguished Eagle Scout Award | Internationally renowned paleoanthropologist, physical anthropologist and archeologist | |
| Sam Berns † | 2014 | | Suffered from progeria; helped raise awareness of the disease | |
| Richard J. Berry | 1978 c. | | Member of the New Mexico House of Representatives (2007–2009); Mayor of Albuquerque, New Mexico (2009–2017) | |
| Dick Beyer † | 1946 | | Professional wrestler; schoolteacher; coach | |
| James Bidlack | 1978 | | Professor of Biology at University of Central Oklahoma; textbook author; founder of Metabolism Foundation | |
| Jeff Bingaman | 1958 | Distinguished Eagle Scout Award | Senator from New Mexico (1983–2013); Attorney General of New Mexico (1979–1983) | ^{[a]} |
| Robert Birkby | 1966 | | Adventure guide, author, photographer, speaker and trail designer; wrote the 10th, 11th and 12th editions of the Boy Scout Handbook and the 4th edition of the Fieldbook | |
| Arthur Gary Bishop † | 1967 | | Serial killer | |
| Sanford Bishop | 1962 | Distinguished Eagle Scout Award | Representative from Georgia (1993–) | ^{[a]} |
| Frank S. Blair † | 1930 | Distinguished Eagle Scout Award | News Anchor for NBC's Today Show 1953 to 1975 | ^{[a]}^{[e]} |
| Michael Bloomberg | 1954 | | Mayor of the City of New York (2002–2014); businessman and the founder of Bloomberg L.P. | ^{[e]} |
| Guion Bluford | 1958 c. | | Air Force colonel; astronaut who participated in four flights of the Space Shuttle–STS-8, STS-39, STS-53, and STS-61-A; first African American in space; designated as the emissary to return the Challenger flag to a Boy Scout troop | ^{[c]} |
| Matthew Bogusz | 2004 | | Mayor of Des Plaines, Illinois | |
| Charles H. Bonesteel III † | 1925 | Distinguished Eagle Scout Award | Army general who commanded the US forces in Korea (1966–1969) | ^{[a]} |
| Ken Bowersox | 1972 c. | | Navy captain; astronaut; test pilot; veteran of seven space flights-STS-50, STS-61, STS-73, STS-82, STS-113, Expedition 6, and Soyuz TMA-1 | ^{[c]} |
| Alpha L. Bowser † | 1925 | Distinguished Eagle Scout Award | United States Marine Corps lieutenant general, combat veteran of World War II and the Korean War, decorated for his actions during the Battle of Iwo Jima and in the Battle of Chosin Reservoir | ^{[a]} |
| Pat Boyd | 1998 | NESA Outstanding Eagle Scout Award | Member of the Connecticut House of Representatives | |
| David Boyer | 1977 c. | | Member of the Maine House of Representatives | |
| William W. Bradley | 1957 | Distinguished Eagle Scout Award | Rhodes Scholar; National Basketball Association basketball player with the New York Knicks (1967–1977); Senator from New Jersey (1979–1997); US presidential candidate (2000) | ^{[a]}^{[e]}^{[d]} |
| Charles E. Brady Jr. † | 1966 | Distinguished Eagle Scout Award | Astronaut who flew on shuttle mission STS-78 | ^{[a]}^{[c]} |
| James Brady † | 1955 | Distinguished Eagle Scout Award | Gun control advocate; White House Press Secretary under President Ronald Reagan; shot and became permanently disabled during the attempted assassination of Ronald Reagan | ^{[a]} |
| Mike Braun | 1975 | | 52nd Governor of Indiana; Senator from Indiana | |
| Aaron Brewer | 2008 | | Long snapper for the Arizona Cardinals; Super Bowl 50 champion | |
| Stephen Breyer | 1952 | Distinguished Eagle Scout Award | Associate Justice of the Supreme Court of the United States (1994–2022) | ^{[a]}^{[e]} |
| James Bridenstine | 1991 c. | | Representative from Oklahoma's 1st congressional district (2013–2018), Administrator of the National Aeronautics and Space Administration (2018–2021) | |
| Beverly Briley † | 1926 c. | | Attorney, politician, mayor of Nashville, Tennessee | |
| Wayne Brock | 1965 | Distinguished Eagle Scout Award | Chief Scout Executive of the Boy Scouts of America | ^{[a]} |
| Jeff Brown | 1976 c. | NESA Outstanding Eagle Scout Award | Judge of the United States District Court for the Southern District of Texas | |
| Rex Brown | 1980 c. | | Musician and author | |
| Sherrod Brown | 1968 | | Representative (1993–2007) and Senator from Ohio (2007–2025) | |
| William O. Burch † | 1922 | | Triple WWII Navy Cross recipient and Rear Admiral | |
| Russell Adam Burnham | 1995 | | Great-grandson of Frederick Russell Burnham; U.S. Army's Soldier of the Year in 2003 and Medical Corps Non-commissioned officer of the Year in 2007 | |
| M. Caldwell Butler † | 1941 | Distinguished Eagle Scout Award | U.S. Representative from Virginia | ^{[a]} |
| Jay Bybee | 1969 c. | | Federal judge on United States Court of Appeals for the Ninth Circuit | |

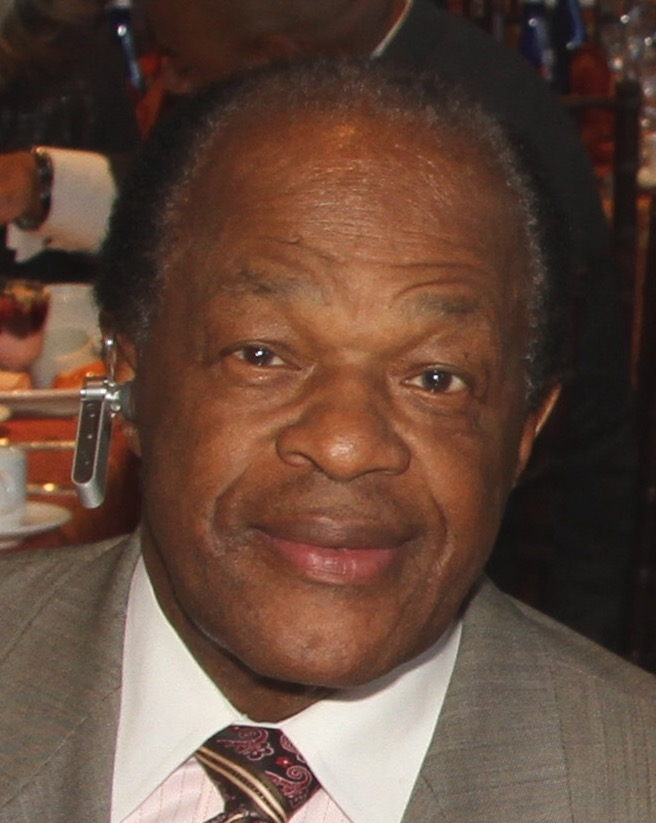
Marion Barry

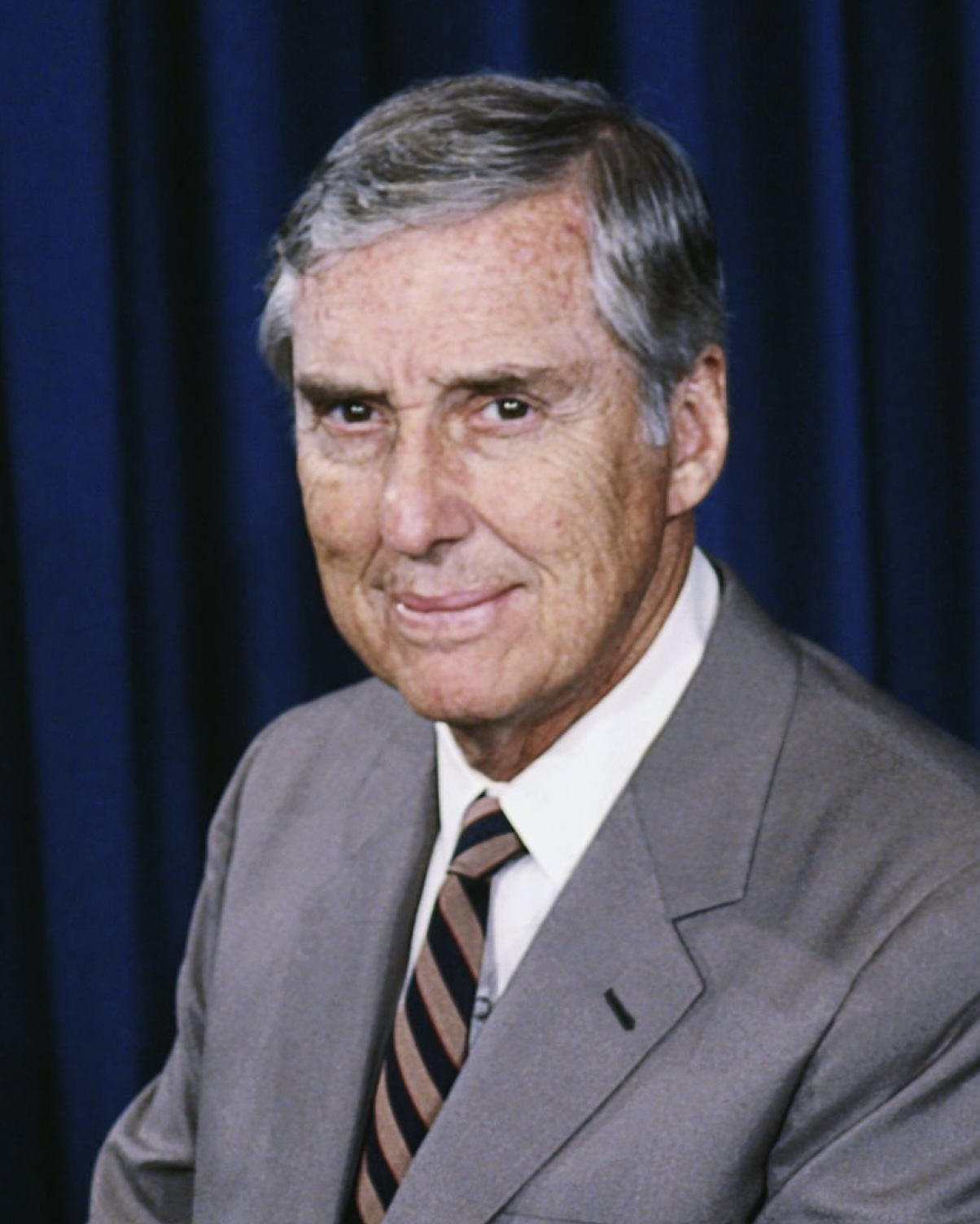
Lloyd Bentsen

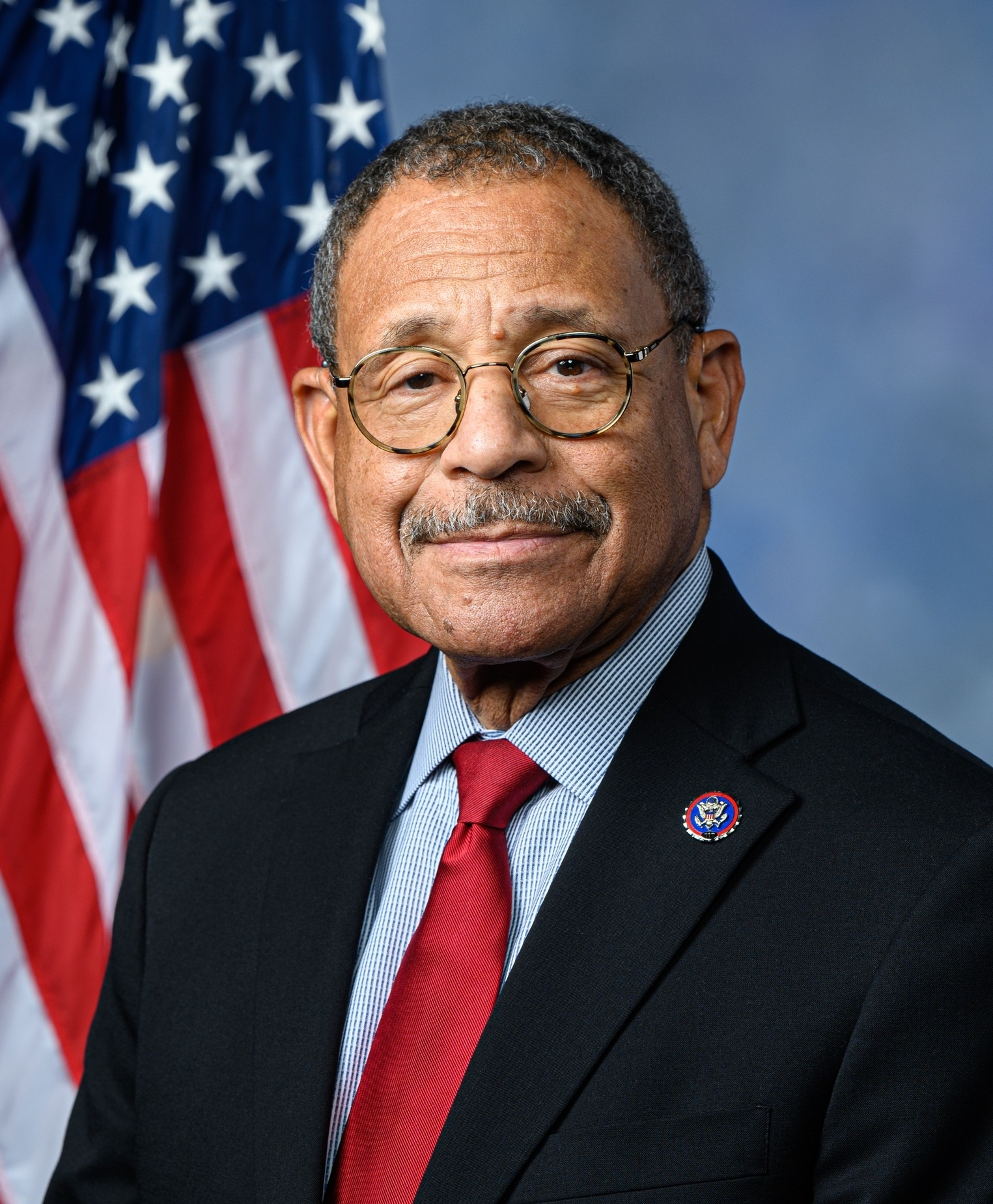
Sanford Bishop

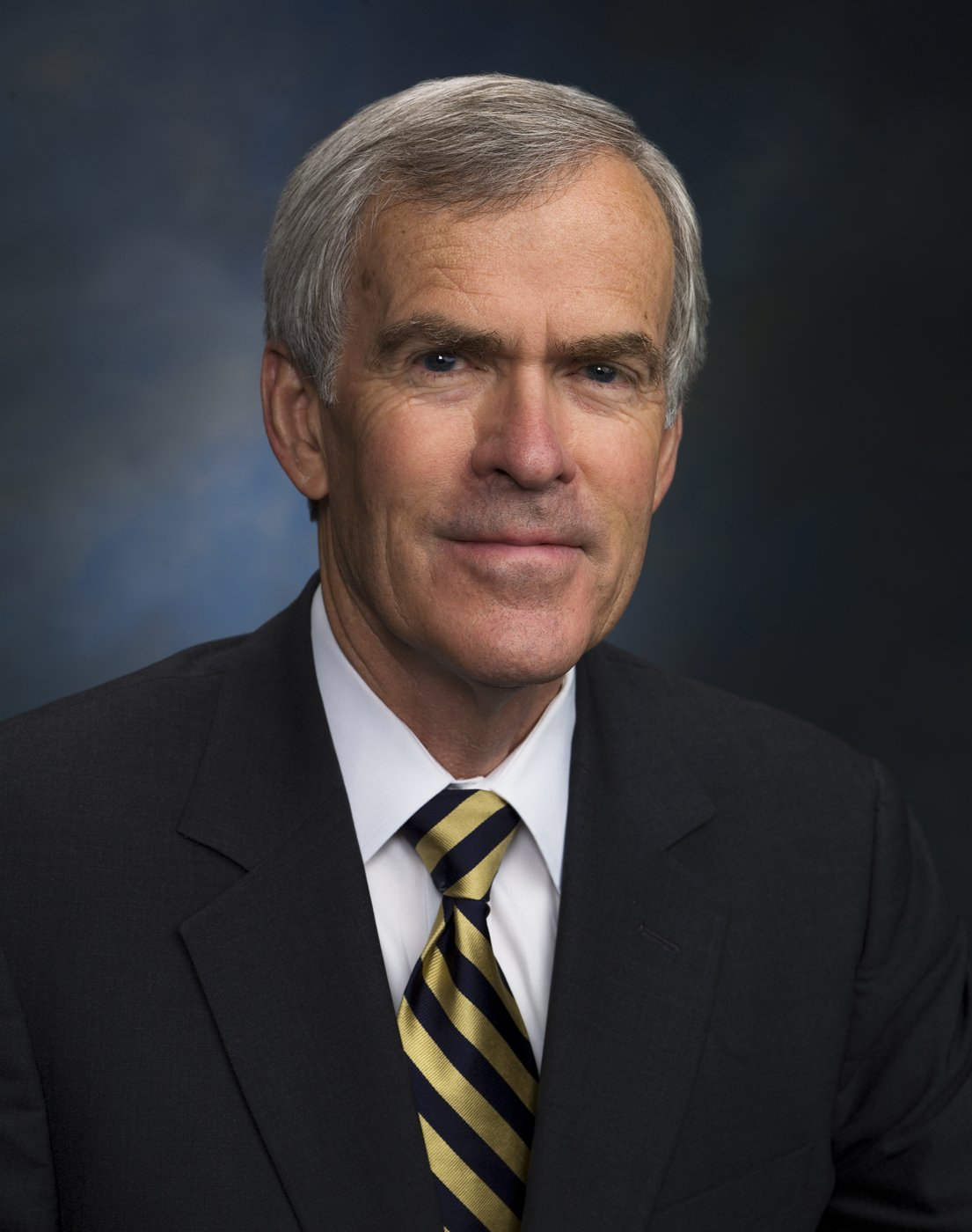
Jeff Bingaman

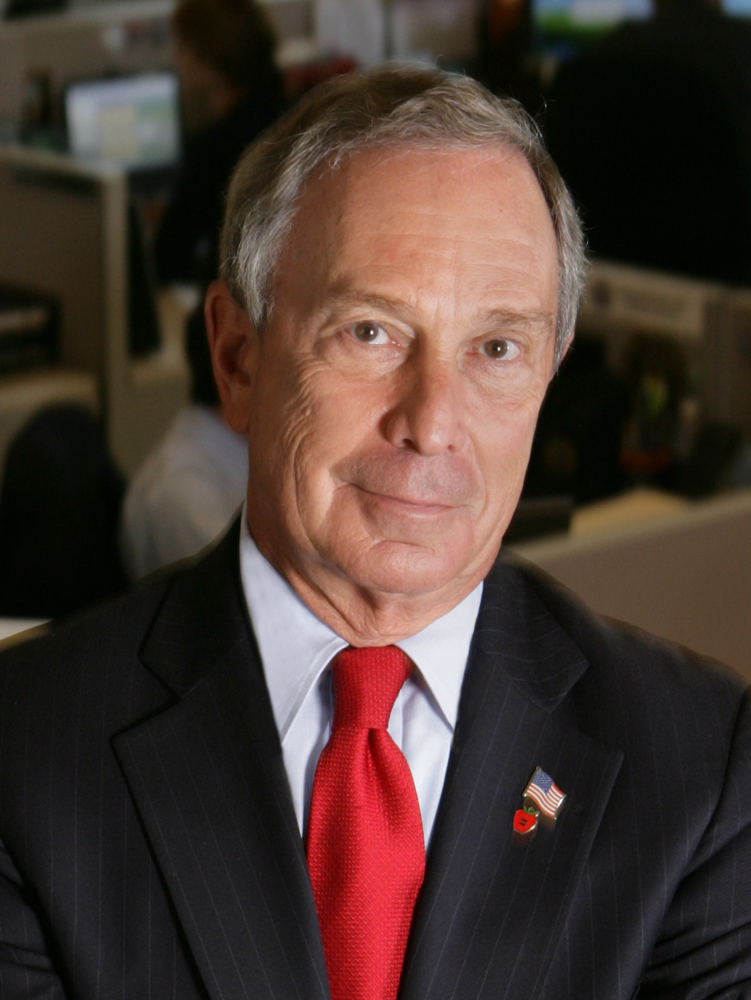
Michael Bloomberg

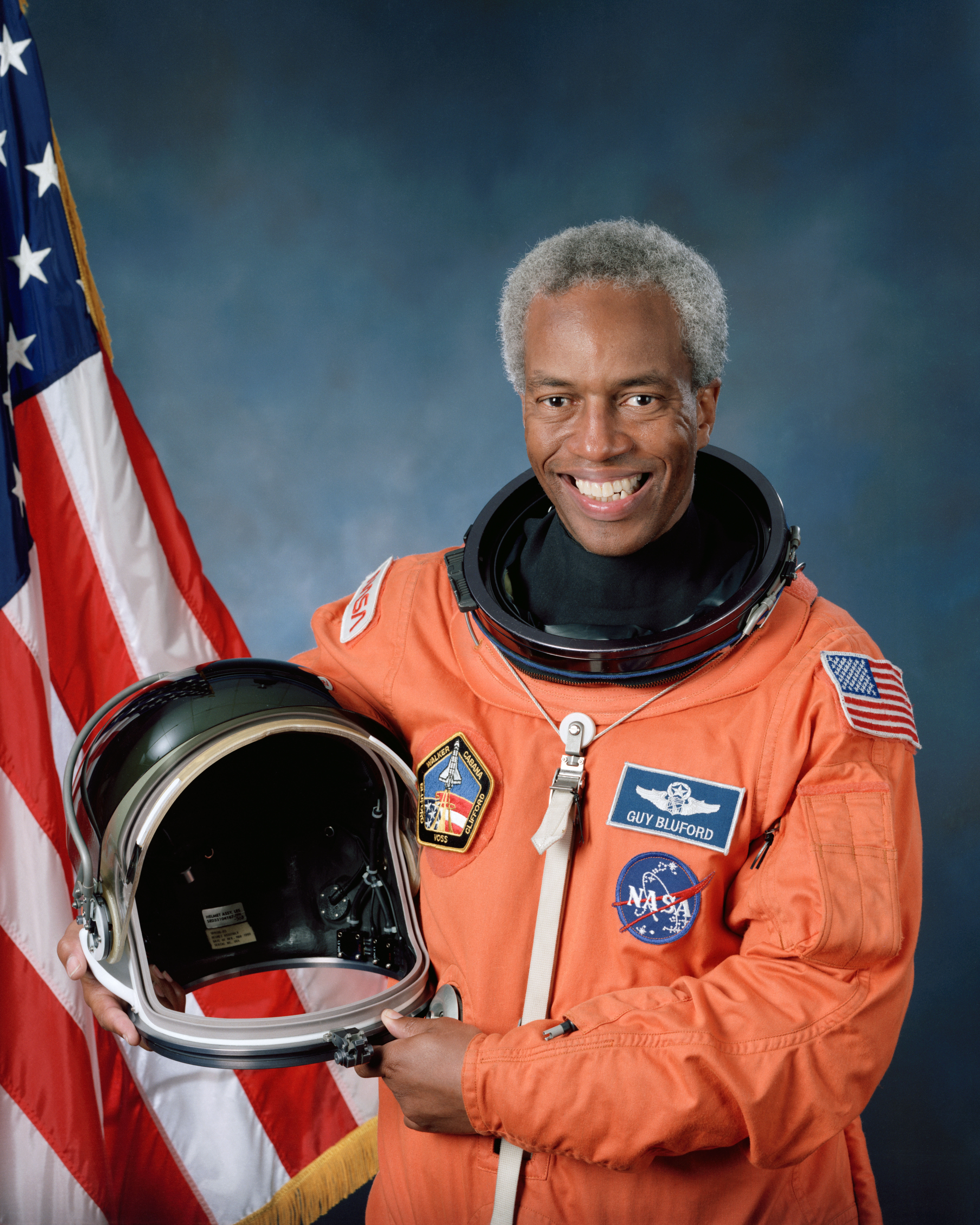
Guy Bluford

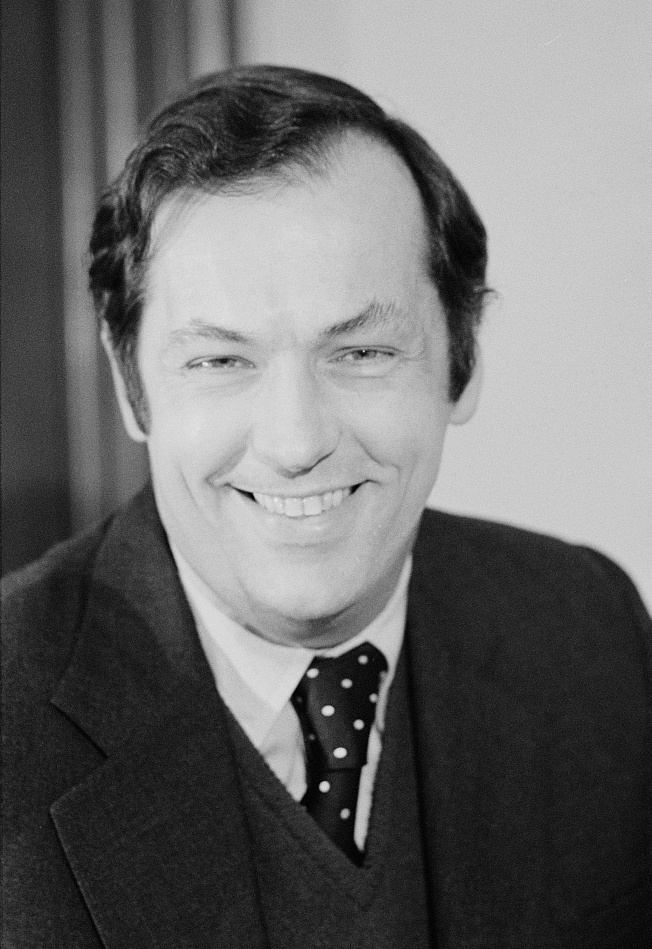
Bill Bradley

=== C ===
| Name | Eagle Scout | Awards | Notability | References |
|---|---|---|---|---|
| Patrick T. Caffery † | 1950 | | Representative from Louisiana (1969–1973) | |
| John Tyler Caldwell † | 1926 | Distinguished Eagle Scout Award | Chancellor of North Carolina State University (1959–1975) | ^{[a]} |
| John F. Campbell | 1975 c. | NESA Outstanding Eagle Scout Award | Army general; last commander of the International Security Assistance Force | |
| William Durant Campbell † | 1922 | Distinguished Eagle Scout Award | Founder of the World Scout Foundation, member of World Scout Committee | ^{[a]} |
| Milton Caniff † | 1923 | Distinguished Eagle Scout Award | Cartoonist for the Terry and the Pirates and Steve Canyon comic strips | ^{[a]}^{[d]} |
| James J. Carey | 1955 | NESA Outstanding Eagle Scout Award | Rear Admiral of the United States Navy | |
| Russ Carnahan | 1971 | | Representative from Missouri (2005–2013) | ^{[a]} |
| Gerald P. Carr † | 1947 | Distinguished Eagle Scout Award | Marine Corps colonel; astronaut who commanded Skylab 4 | ^{[a]} |
| Terrance Carroll | 1985 c. | | Speaker of the Colorado House of Representatives (2009–2011) | |
| Sonny Carter † | 1962 | Distinguished Eagle Scout Award | Astronaut who flew on shuttle mission including STS-33; medical doctor; Navy officer; test pilot; professional soccer player | ^{[a]} |
| Thomas Cech | 1962 | Distinguished Eagle Scout Award | Chemist and 1989 Nobel Laureate in Chemistry | ^{[a]} |
| Roger B. Chaffee † | 1951 | | Navy lieutenant commander; pilot and astronaut; killed in the Apollo 1 training exercise | ^{[c]} |
| Kirk Chambers | 1997 | | National Football League offensive tackle for the Cleveland Browns (2004–2005) and Buffalo Bills (2007–) | |
| Gregory Chamitoff | 1980 | | Astronaut who flew on missions STS-124, Expedition 17, Expedition 18, STS-126 | ^{[c]} |
| Jake Chapman | 2003 c. | | Member of the Iowa Senate | |
| Eugene Calvin Cheatham Jr. † | 1931 | | Air Force lieutenant colonel; fighter pilot with the Tuskegee Airmen during World War II; then flew over 100 missions during the Korean War | |
| Kim B. Clark | 1964 | Distinguished Eagle Scout Award | Dean of the Faculty at Harvard Business School (1995–2005); president of Brigham Young University–Idaho (2005–2015) | ^{[a]} |
| Marcus R. Clark † | 1970 c. | | Louisiana Supreme Court justice | |
| Preston Cloud † | 1929 c. | | Earth scientist, biogeologist, cosmologist, and paleontologist | |
| Tom C. Clark † | 1914 | Distinguished Eagle Scout Award | Associate justice of the Supreme Court (1949–1967) | ^{[a]} |
| Daniel L. Coberly | 1973 | Distinguished Eagle Scout Award | Army officer, civil servant, author, recipient of the Silver Buffalo | |
| Thad Cochran † | 1952 | Distinguished Eagle Scout Award | Senator from Mississippi (1978–2018) | ^{[a]} |
| George Thomas Coker | 1959 | Distinguished Eagle Scout Award | Navy commander; honored with the Navy Cross for his leadership as a prisoner of war during the Vietnam War | ^{[a]}^{[e]} |
| Austin Collie | 2004 | | Wide receiver for the National Football League's Indianapolis Colts | |
| Chris Collins | 1964 | NESA Outstanding Eagle Scout Award | Representative from New York's 27th congressional district | ^{[a]} |
| Barber Conable † | 1937 | Distinguished Eagle Scout Award | Representative from New York (1965–1985); president of the World Bank (1986–1991) | ^{[a]} |
| Jim Cooper | 1970 c. | | Representative from Tennessee (2003–2023) | ^{[a]} |
| Dr. Kenneth H. Cooper | 1946 | Distinguished Eagle Scout Award | Father of modern aerobics; U.S. Air Force lieutenant colonel | ^{[a]} |
| Rob Corddry | 1988 | | Actor | |
| Tom Cotter | 1989 | | American environmentalist, renewable energy advocate, social entrepreneur, clergyman | |
| Britain Covey | 2015 | | Football wide receiver and return man for the Philadelphia Eagles | |
| Richard O. Covey | 1960 | Distinguished Eagle Scout Award | Astronaut who was the pilot for the first Return to Space flight and flew shuttle missions STS-26, STS-38, STS-51-I, STS-61 | ^{[a]} |
| Steven Cozza | 2000 | | Co-founder of the advocacy group Scouting for All, professional road bicycle racer | |
| Mike Crapo | 1966 | Distinguished Eagle Scout Award | Senator from Idaho (1999–) | ^{[a]} |
| Edward F. Crawley | 1972 | Distinguished Eagle Scout Award | Professor of Aeronautics and Astronautics and of Engineering Systems at Massachusetts Institute of Technology; Ford Professor of Engineering | ^{[a]} |
| John Oliver Creighton | 1958 | | Navy captain; fighter pilot veteran of the Vietnam War; test pilot; astronaut who flew shuttle missions STS-51-G, STS-36 and STS-48 | ^{[c]} |
| John W. Creighton Jr. † | 1946 | Distinguished Eagle Scout Award | Civilian aide to the Secretary of the Army; CEO of Weyerhaeuser and United Airlines; National President of the BSA | ^{[a]} |
| Bobby Crespino † | 1957 | | Football tight end who played for the Cleveland Browns and New York Giants | |
| Roger K. Crouch | 1956 c. | | Astronaut who flew on missions STS-83 and STS-94 | |
| Michael M. Crow | 1969 | | President of Arizona State University | |
| Joe Cunningham | 2000 c. | | U.S. Representative for South Carolina's 1st congressional district. | |
| Ben Curtis | 1996 c. | | Actor best known for his Dell ads | |
| Clive Cussler † | 1946 | | Adventure novelist and successful amateur marine archaeologist, founder of National Underwater and Marine Agency (NUMA) | |

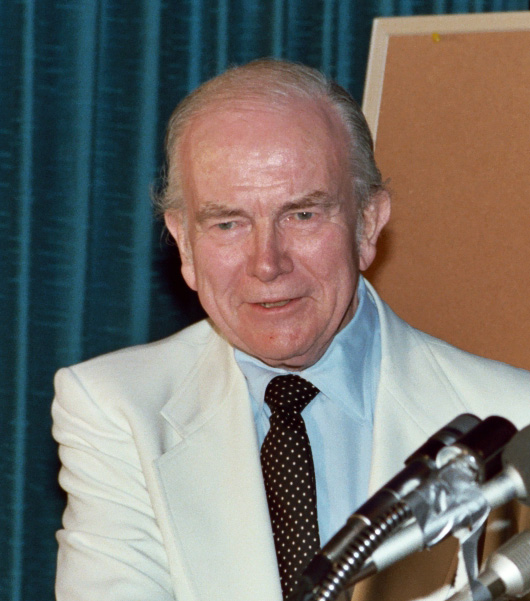
Milton Caniff

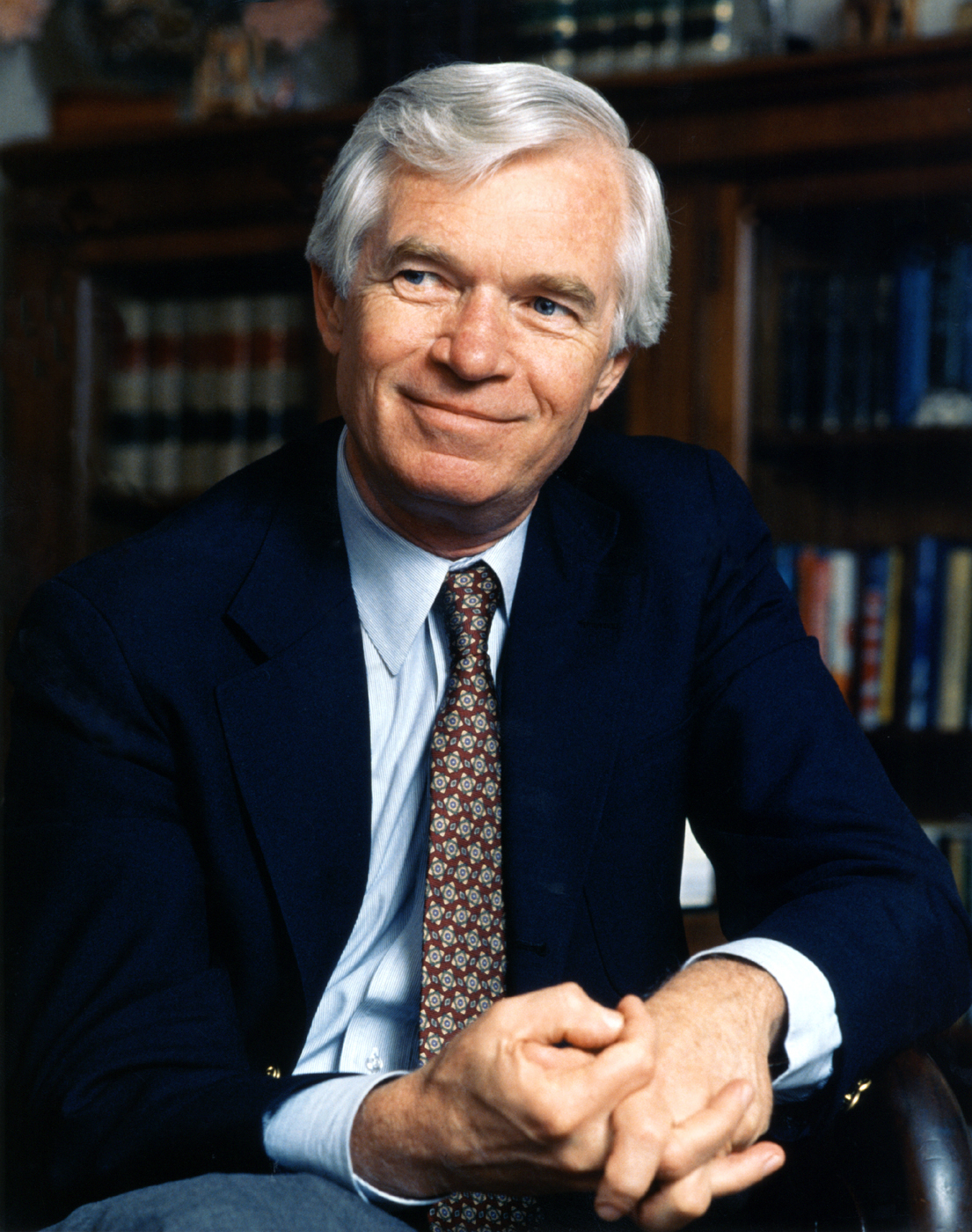
Thad Cochran

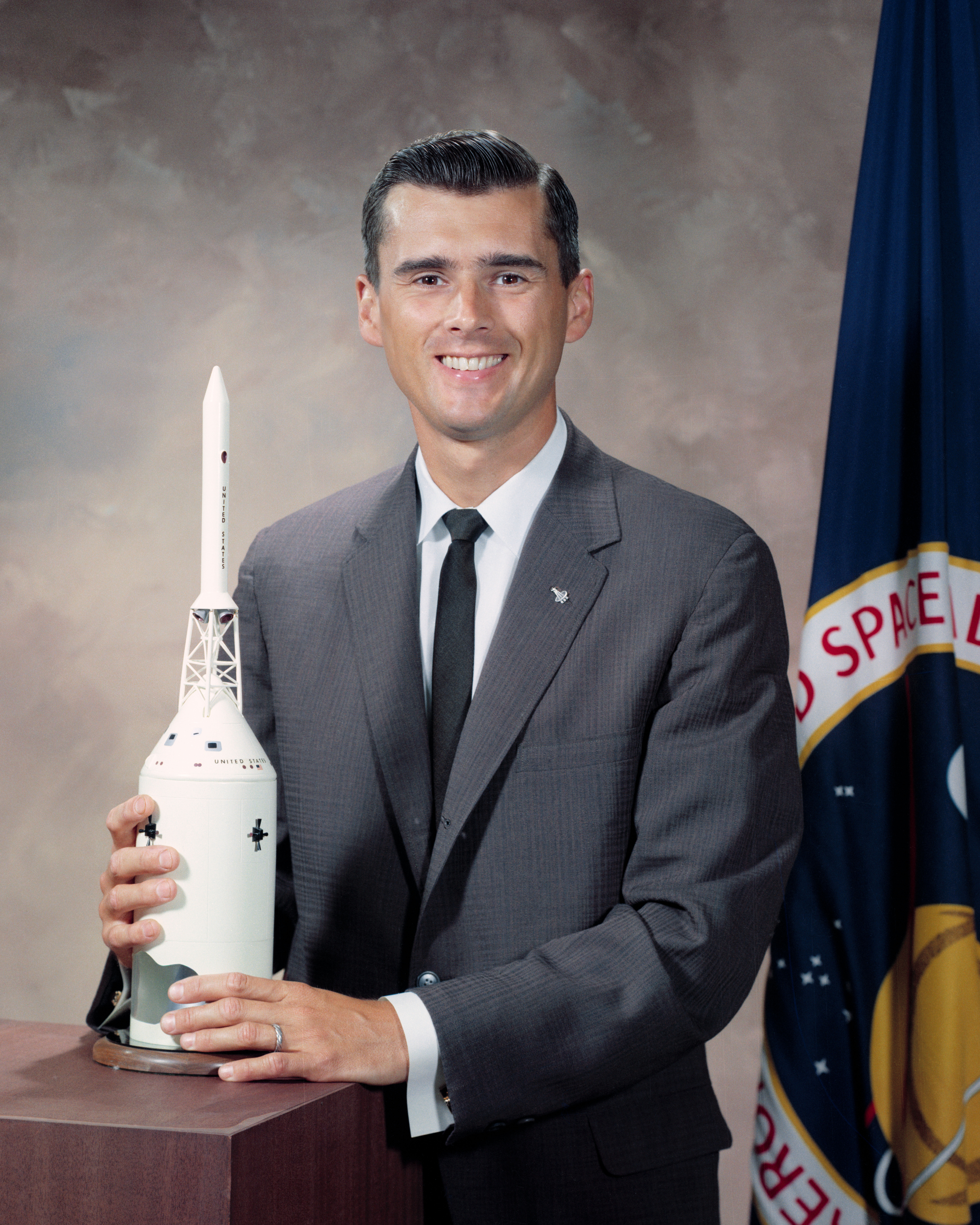
Roger Chaffee

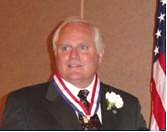
George Coker, receiving his DESA

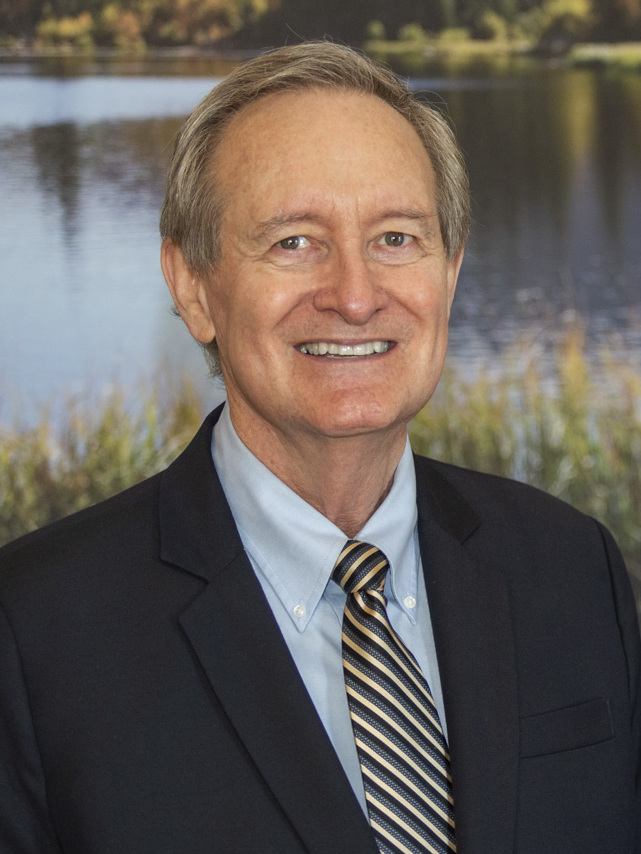
Mike Crapo

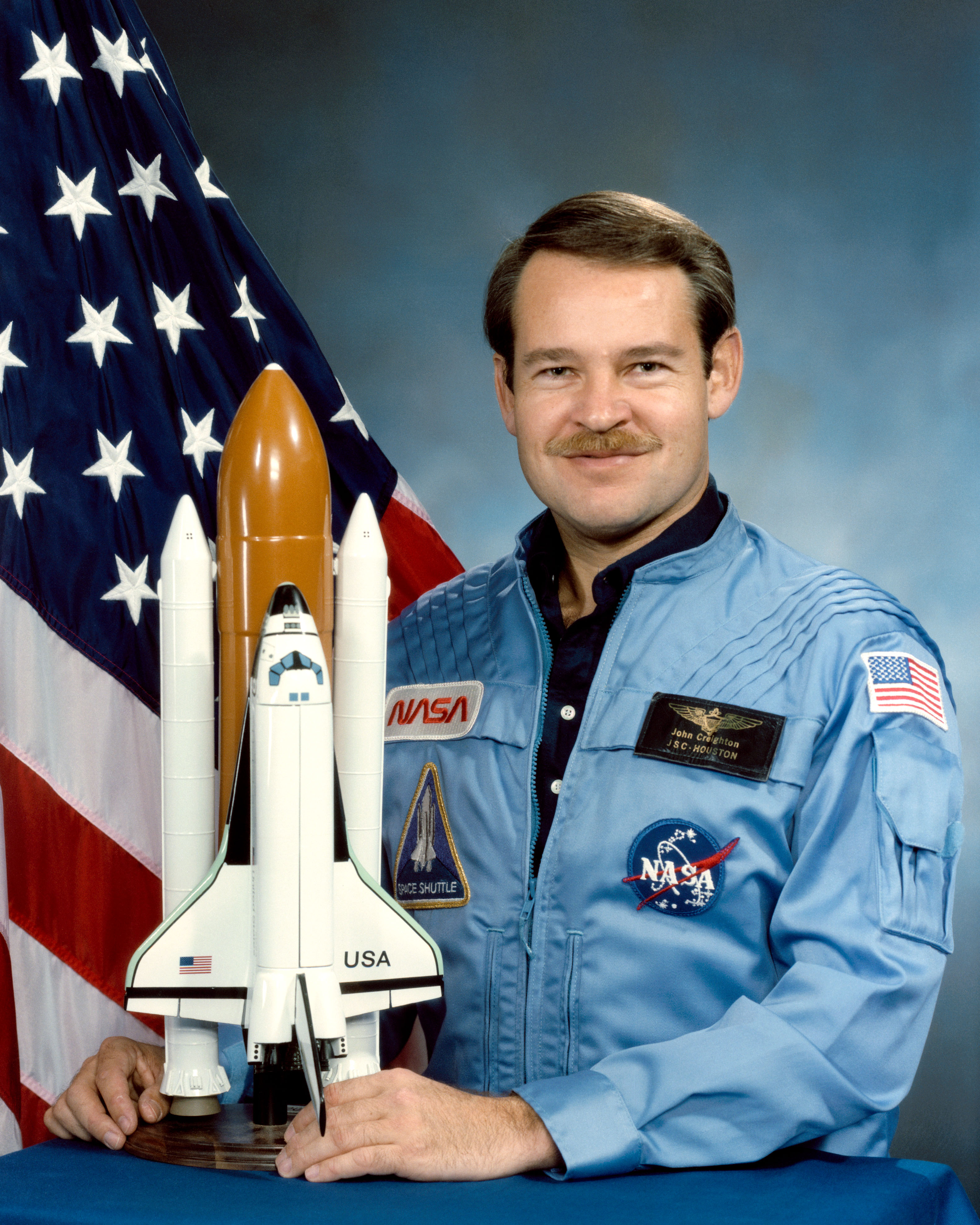
John Creighton

=== D ===
| Name | Eagle Scout | Awards | Notability | References |
|---|---|---|---|---|
| Richard F. Daines † | 1967 c. | | New York State Health Commissioner | |
| James Dale | 1986 c. | | Litigant in Boy Scouts of America v. Dale, a landmark case decision by the Supreme Court of the United States on the rights of private organizations | |
| William E. Dannemeyer † | 1944 | Distinguished Eagle Scout Award | Honorary National Chairman of Citizens for a Better America; Representative from California (1979–1993) | ^{[a]} |
| Hal Daub | 1955 | Distinguished Eagle Scout Award | Representative from Nebraska (1981–1989); lawyer; Mayor of Omaha (1995–2001) | ^{[a]} |
| James H. Daughdrill Jr. † | 1947 | Distinguished Eagle Scout Award | President of Rhodes College (1973–1999) | ^{[a]} |
| John Denney | 1994 c. | | Collegiate (BYU) and professional (Miami Dolphins) American football player | |
| William Derrough | 1980 | | Treasurer of the U.S. Democratic National Committee (DNC); investment banker and Co-Head of the Recapitalization and Restructuring Group at Moelis & Company | ^{[a]} |
| Patrick Deuel † | 1976 | | One of the heaviest people in the world | |
| William DeVries | 1959 c. | | Cardiothoracic surgeon who performed the first successful permanent artificial heart implant | ^{[d]} |
| Jordan Devey | 2006 | | Football offensive lineman for the New England Patriots | |
| Landon Dickerson | 2016 | | Football offensive lineman for the Philadelphia Eagles | |
| Geoff Diehl | 1986 c. | | State Representative from Massachusetts (2011-2019) | |
| David Dillon | 1967 c. | | CEO and chairman of the board of Kroger | |
| George Hall Dixon † | 1936 c. | | Served as president of First National Bank of Minnesota and First Bank Systems (now US Bank), and Deputy Secretary of the Treasury under Gerald Ford. | |
| Robert Dold | 1986 | NESA Outstanding Eagle Scout Award | Representative from Illinois (2011–2013) | ^{[a]} |
| Ivan Dorschner | 2007 c. | | Filipino-American actor, television host and model based in the Philippines. | |
| Paul Douglas | 1975 | Distinguished Eagle Scout Award | Meteorologist, author, speaker | |
| Gentner Drummond | 1979 c. | NESA Outstanding Eagle Scout Award | U.S. Air Force pilot, businessman, rancher, attorney | |
| Michael Dukakis | 1949 | Distinguished Eagle Scout Award | 65th and 67th Governor of Massachusetts; US presidential candidate (1988) | ^{[a]}^{[e]} |
| Charles Duke | 1949 c. | Distinguished Eagle Scout Award | Air Force brigadier general; astronaut, as a member of Apollo 16 he became one of only twelve men who have walked on the Moon | ^{[a]}^{[e]} |
| James "Red" Duke † | 1951 | Distinguished Eagle Scout Award | Renowned surgeon; host of his own medical TV series and Texan icon who founded Houston's Life Flight using a model that was adopted nationally | ^{[a]} |
| Mike Dunne † | 1962 | | Award-winning newspaper reporter at The Baton Rouge Morning Advocaste; author; adjunct professor at Louisiana State University | |
| Aquilla J. Dyess † | 1925 c. | | Lieutenant colonel in the Marine Corps during World War II who was awarded the Medal of Honor posthumously for "conspicuous gallantry and intrepidity at the risk of his life" during the Battle of Kwajalein | ^{[e]} |

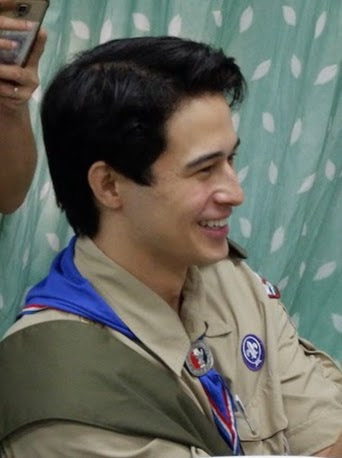
Ivan Dorschner

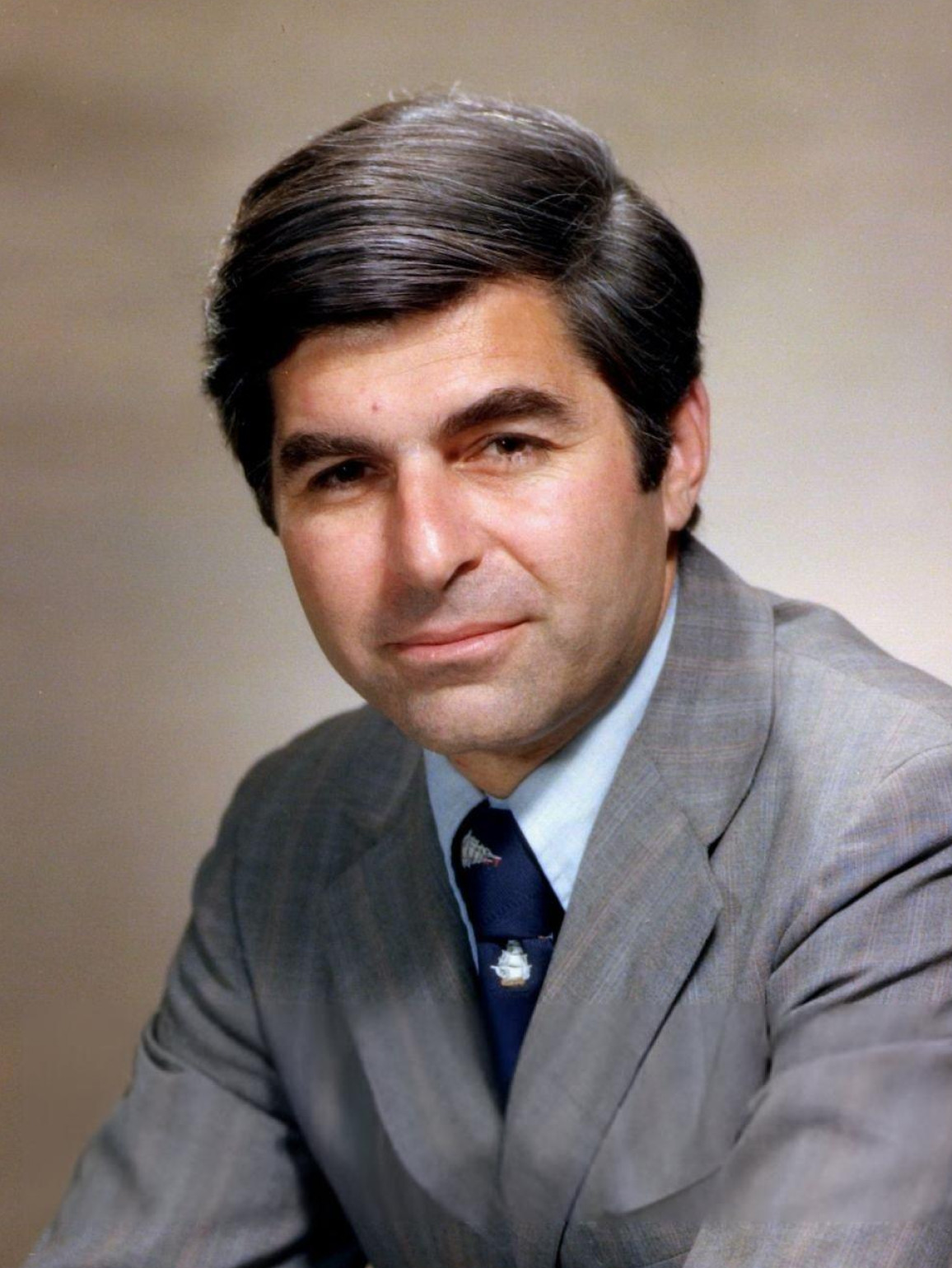
Michael Dukakis

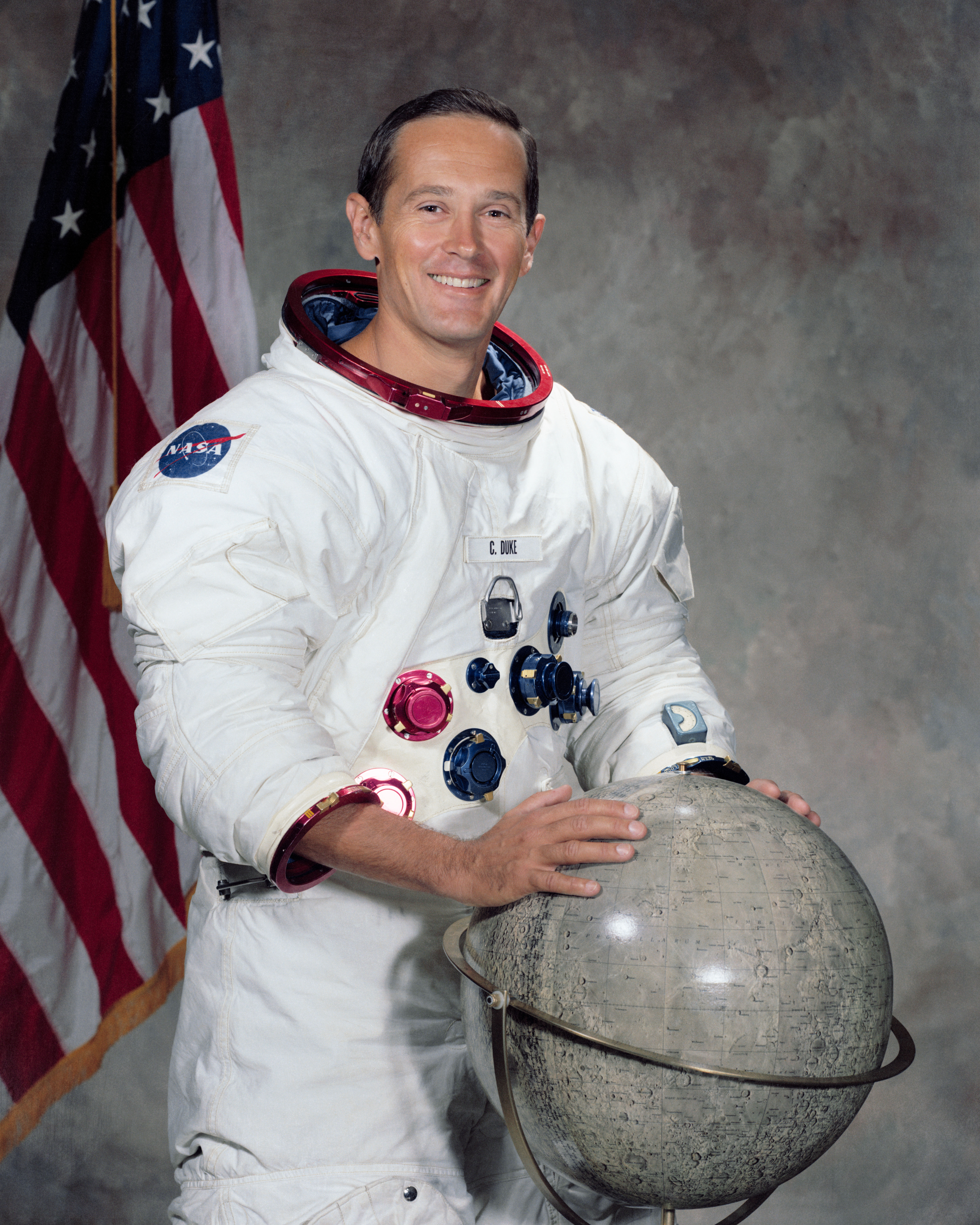
Charles Duke

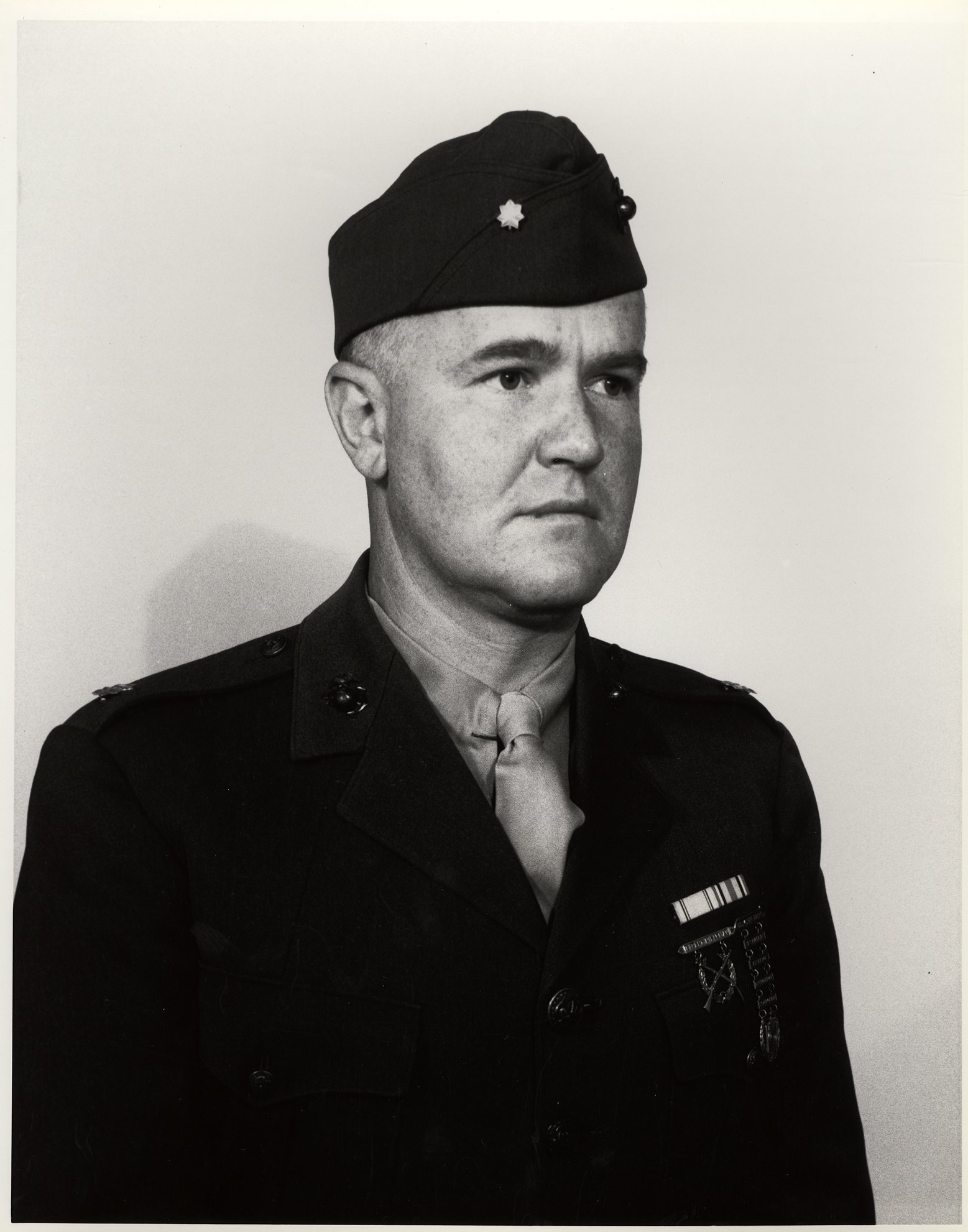
Aquilla J. Dyess

=== E ===
| Name | Eagle Scout | Awards | Notability | References |
|---|---|---|---|---|
| Ronnie Earle † | 1957 | | District attorney for Travis County, Texas; known for bringing to light the Jack Abramoff scandals and for filing charges against House majority leader Tom DeLay | |
| Richard H. Ebright | 1975 | | Molecular biologist, researcher, and professor | |
| John Ehrlichman † | 1942 | Distinguished Eagle Scout Award | Assistant to President Richard Nixon (1969–1973) | ^{[a]} |
| Donn F. Eisele † | 1945 | | Air Force colonel; Apollo 7 astronaut | ^{[c]} |
| Arthur Rose Eldred † | 1912 | | First Eagle Scout; agricultural official and executive; Navy veteran of World War I; received BSA's Bronze Honor Medal for lifesaving; first of four generations of Eagle Scouts | |
| Mike Enzi † | 1957 | Distinguished Eagle Scout Award | Senator from Wyoming (1997–2021) | ^{[a]}^{[e]} |
| John Erickson | 1958 | Distinguished Eagle Scout Award | Founder, CEO, and Executive Chairman of Retirement Living TV and served for 28 years as CEO of Erickson Living, formerly Erickson Retirement Communities | ^{[a]} |
| Roy Estess † | 1953 | Distinguished Eagle Scout Award | Director of John C. Stennis Space Center (1989–2002) | ^{[a]} |
| Daniel J. Evans † | 1941 | Distinguished Eagle Scout Award | 16th Governor of Washington; Senator from Washington (1983–1989) | ^{[a]} |

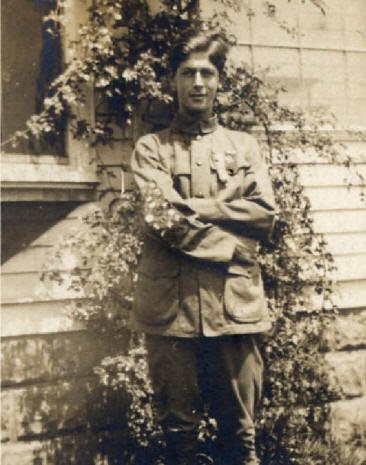
Arthur Eldred

=== F ===
| Name | Eagle Scout | Awards | Notability | References |
|---|---|---|---|---|
| David Farabee | 1982 c. | | Insurance agent and vice-president; Representative from Texas (1998–2011) | |
| Philo Farnsworth † | 1932 | | Inventor, holder of first patent for an electronic television; Eagle award presented to his wife in 2006 as it had been earned but not presented | |
| Robert Edward Femoyer † | 1937 | | Army Air Forces navigator during World War II who was awarded the Medal of Honor | |
| Lawrence Ferlinghetti † | 1935 c. | | Poet best known as the co-owner of the City Lights Bookstore and publishing house, which published early literary works of the Beat Generation | |
| Alva R. Fitch † | 1923 | | Army lieutenant general; survivor of the Bataan Death March; deputy director of the Defense Intelligence Agency (1961–1964) | |
| James P. Fitch † | 1914 c. | | First Region Scout Executive, Region Nine (Texas, Oklahoma and New Mexico), B.S.A. (1919–1945); Silver Antelope Award recipient; General Manager of Philmont Scout Ranch and Phillips Properties, B.S.A. (1945–1949); Assistant to the Chief Scout Executive (1949–1952). | |
| Mike Fitzpatrick † | 1979 c. | | Congressman from Bucks County, Pennsylvania (2005–2007, 2011–2017); Silver Beaver Award recipient | |
| Charles Fleming | 1971 | | Author, reporter and teacher | |
| Woodie Flowers † | 1957 c. | | Emeritus professor of mechanical engineering at the Massachusetts Institute of Technology | |
| Eugene B. Fluckey † | 1948 | | Navy submarine commander during World War II who received the Medal of Honor | |
| Tom Foley † | 1945 c. | | Representative from Washington (1965–1995); Speaker of the United States House of Representatives (1989–1995); Ambassador to Japan (1998–2001) | ^{[d]} |
| Christopher Fogt | 2000 | | Olympic bobsledder | |
| Gerald Ford † | 1927 | Distinguished Eagle Scout Award | Representative from Michigan (1949–1973); 40th Vice President of the United States; 38th President of the United States | ^{[a]}^{[e]}^{[d]} |
| David Foreman † | 1963 c. | | Co-founder of environmental activist group Earth First! | |
| Patrick G. Forrester | 1971 | | Army colonel; astronaut who flew on STS-105, STS-117, and STS-128. | ^{[c]} |
| Steve Fossett † | 1957 | Distinguished Eagle Scout Award | Aviator and adventurer known for his five world record non-stop circumnavigations of the Earth: as a long-distance solo balloonist, as a sailor, and as a solo airplane pilot; president of the National Eagle Scout Association; Silver Buffalo Award recipient | ^{[a]}^{[d]} |
| Michael E. Fossum | 1975 | Distinguished Eagle Scout Award | Air Force Reserve colonel; astronaut who flew on STS-121 as a mission specialist | ^{[a]}^{[c]} |
| Murphy J. Foster Jr. † | 1946 | Distinguished Eagle Scout Award | 53rd Governor of Louisiana | ^{[a]} |
| Joe S. Frank † | 1956 | Distinguished Eagle Scout Award | Mayor of Newport News, Virginia | ^{[a]} |
| Louis Freeh | 1963 | Distinguished Eagle Scout Award | Attorney; 10th director of the Federal Bureau of Investigation | ^{[a]} |
| Daniel Frisa | 1969 | | Journalist; Representative from New York (1995–1997) | |
| Phyllis Frye | 1962 | | First transgender woman to be appointed as a judge in Texas | |
| Brandon Fugal | 1987 | NESA Outstanding Eagle Scout Award | Businessman, venture capitalist, philanthropist, owner of Skinwalker Ranch | |
| C. Gordon Fullerton † | 1952 | | Research pilot; Air Force colonel; astronaut who flew STS-3 and STS-51-F | ^{[c]} |

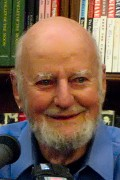
Lawrence Ferlinghetti

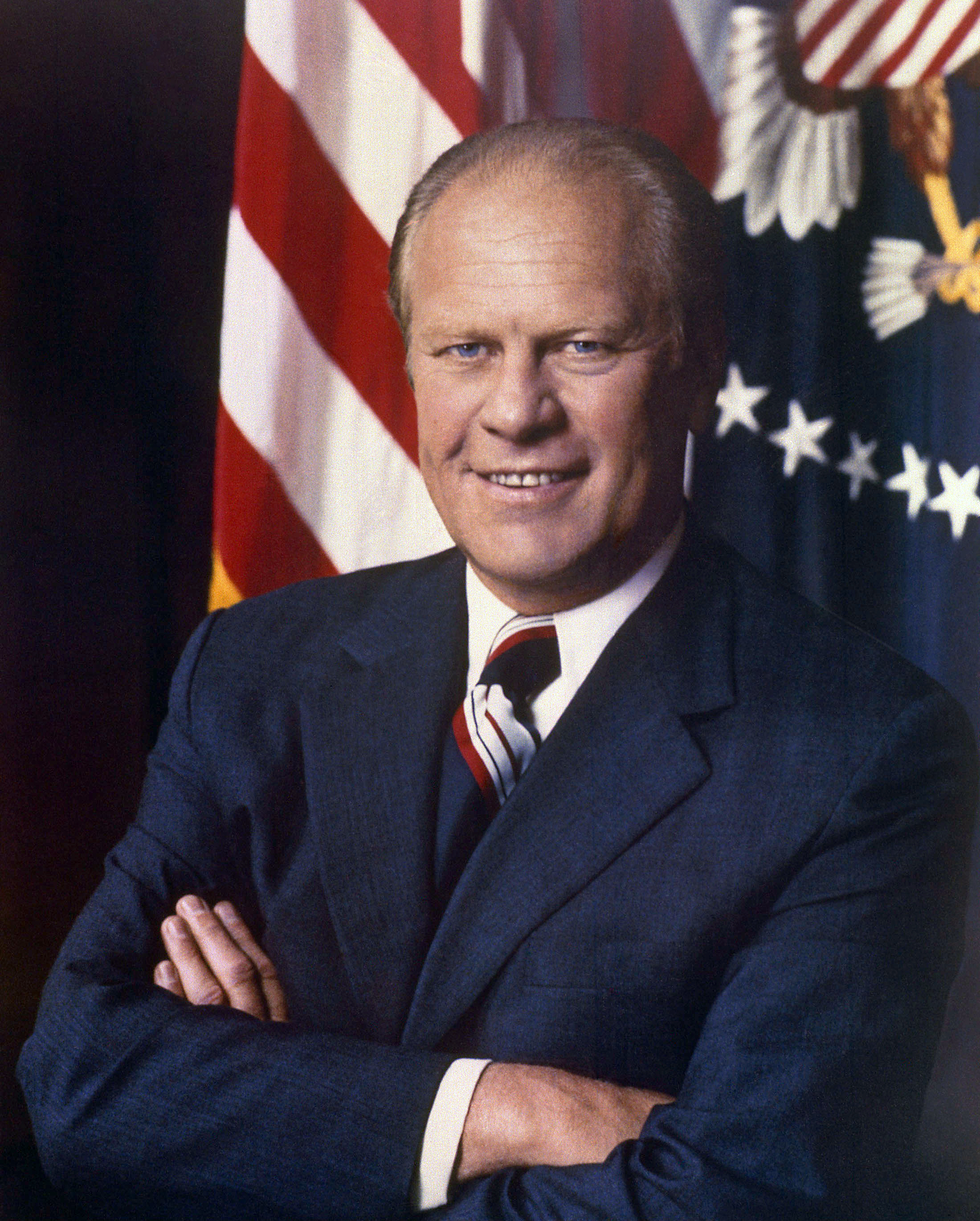
Gerald Ford

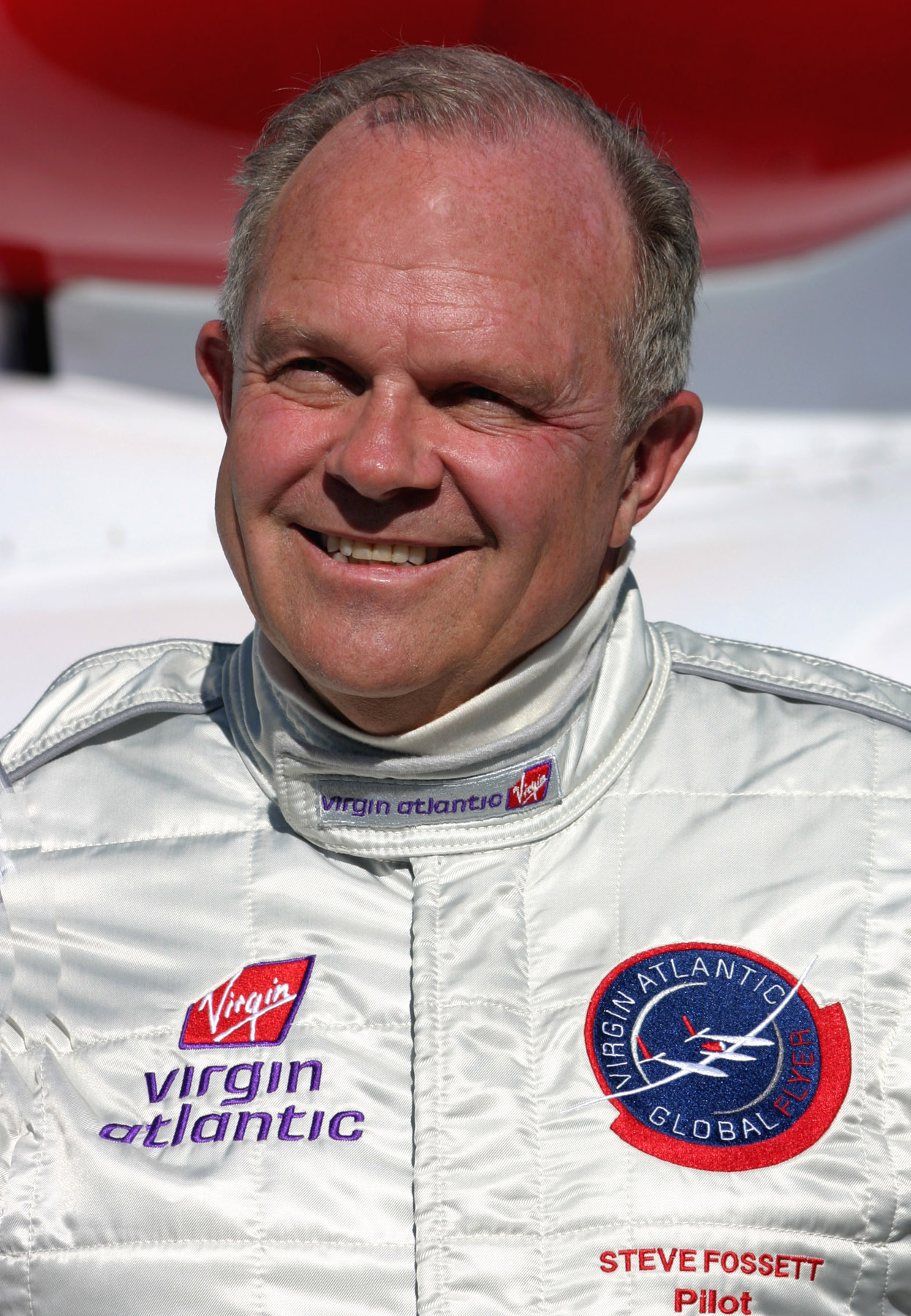
Steve Fossett

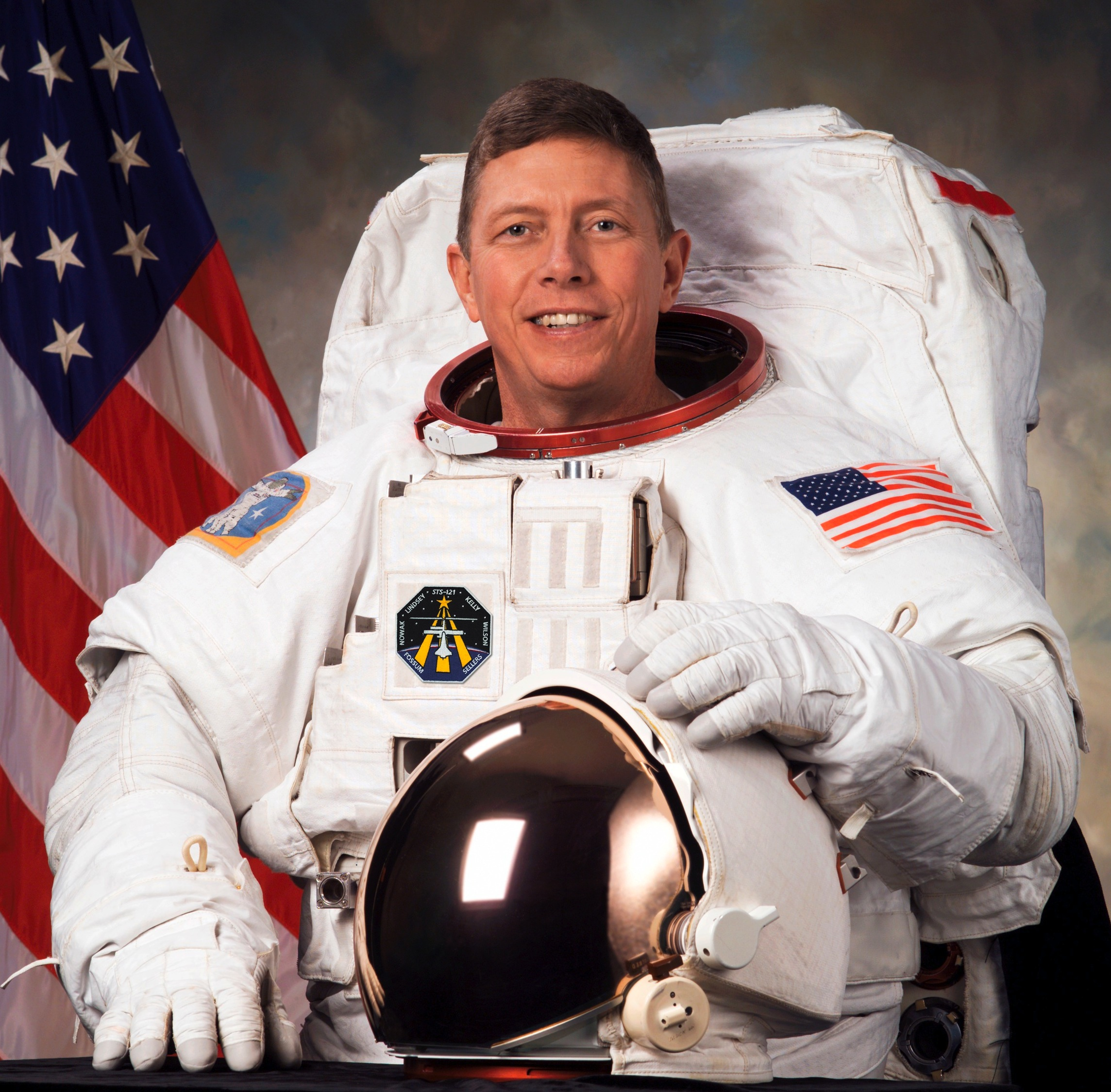
Michael Fossum

=== G ===
| Name | Eagle Scout | Awards | Notability | References |
|---|---|---|---|---|
| Chan Gailey | 1966 | | Offensive coordinator for the New York Jets; head coach of the Buffalo Bills (2010–2012), Dallas Cowboys (1998–1999) and Georgia Tech Yellow Jackets (2002–2007) | ^{[e]} |
| Zach Galifianakis | 1986 | | Primetime Emmy Award-winning stand-up comedian and actor. | |
| John Garamendi | 1960 | Distinguished Eagle Scout Award | Deputy United States Secretary of the Interior (1995–1998); California Insurance Commissioner (2003–2007); 46th lieutenant governor of California | ^{[a]} |
| Don Garlits | 1946 | | Considered to be the "Father of Drag Racing", created first successful rear-engined Top Fuel dragster. | |
| J. Joseph Garrahy † | 1947 | Distinguished Eagle Scout Award | 69th governor of Rhode Island | |
| Robert Gates | 1958 | Distinguished Eagle Scout Award | CIA director (1991–1993); President of Texas A&M University (2002–2007); President of the National Eagle Scout Association; Secretary of Defense (2006–2011); National President of the Boy Scouts of America (2014-2016) | ^{[a]}^{[d]} |
| William H. Gates Sr. † | 1941 | Distinguished Eagle Scout Award | Lawyer and CEO of Bill & Melinda Gates Foundation; father of Bill Gates | ^{[a]}^{[e]} |
| Gordon Gee | 1960 | Distinguished Eagle Scout Award | President of several universities and law professor | ^{[a]} |
| Dick Gephardt | 1955 | Distinguished Eagle Scout Award | Majority Leader of the United States House of Representatives (1989–1995); Representative from Missouri (1977–2005); 2004 presidential candidate | ^{[a]} |
| Gil Gerard † | 1959 c. | | Actor best known for his portrayal of Buck Rogers in the 1979–1981 television series Buck Rogers in the 25th Century | |
| Pat Gillick | 1951 | Distinguished Eagle Scout Award | Retired professional baseball executive; general manager of four Major League Baseball teams with three World Series championships; inducted into the National Baseball Hall of Fame in 2011. | |
| Tyler Glaiel | 2008 | | Video game designer & programmer, known for his work on Aether, Closure, Bombernauts, The End Is Nigh and Mewgenics. | |
| Stanton Glantz | 1960 | | Professor of Medicine in the Division of Cardiology, the American Legacy Foundation Distinguished Professor of Tobacco Control, and director of the Center for Tobacco Control Research and Education at the University of California, San Francisco (UCSF) School of Medicine | |
| Louie Gohmert | 1969 | | Representative from Texas (2005–2023) | |
| David Goldfein | 1976 c. | Distinguished Eagle Scout Award | 21st Chief of Staff of the United States Air Force | |
| Stephen Goldsmith | 1959 | Distinguished Eagle Scout Award | Author, politician, professor, and educator; mayor of Indianapolis (1992–2000) | ^{[a]} |
| Matt Gonzalez | 1981 c. | | Politician, attorney, and editorial writer; member and president of the San Francisco Board of Supervisors from the Green Party (2001–2005) | |
| T. Michael Goodrich | 1961 c. | Distinguished Eagle Scout Award | CEO and chairman of BE&K | |
| Bernard Marshall Gordon | 1941 | Distinguished Eagle Scout Award | Inventor and philanthropist | ^{[a]} |
| Ronald M. Gould | 1962 | Distinguished Eagle Scout Award | Professor at the University of Washington; judge on the Ninth Circuit Court of Appeals (1999–) | ^{[a]} |
| Sam Graves | 1981 c. | | Representative from Missouri (2001–2027) | ^{[a]} |
| Ernest Green | 1956 | Distinguished Eagle Scout Award | Civil rights activist; one of the Little Rock Nine | ^{[a]} |
| William G. Gregory | 1974 c. | | Air Force lieutenant colonel; astronaut who served on shuttle mission STS-67 | ^{[c]} |
| S. David Griggs † | 1953 | | Navy Reserve rear admiral; astronaut who served on shuttle mission STS-51-D | ^{[c]} |
| John H. Groberg | 1948 | Distinguished Eagle Scout Award | Emeritus member of the Seventy for the Church of Jesus Christ of Latter-day Saints | ^{[a]} |
| Jeremy Guthrie | 1994 | | Major League Baseball pitcher, Baltimore Orioles, Kansas City Royals | |

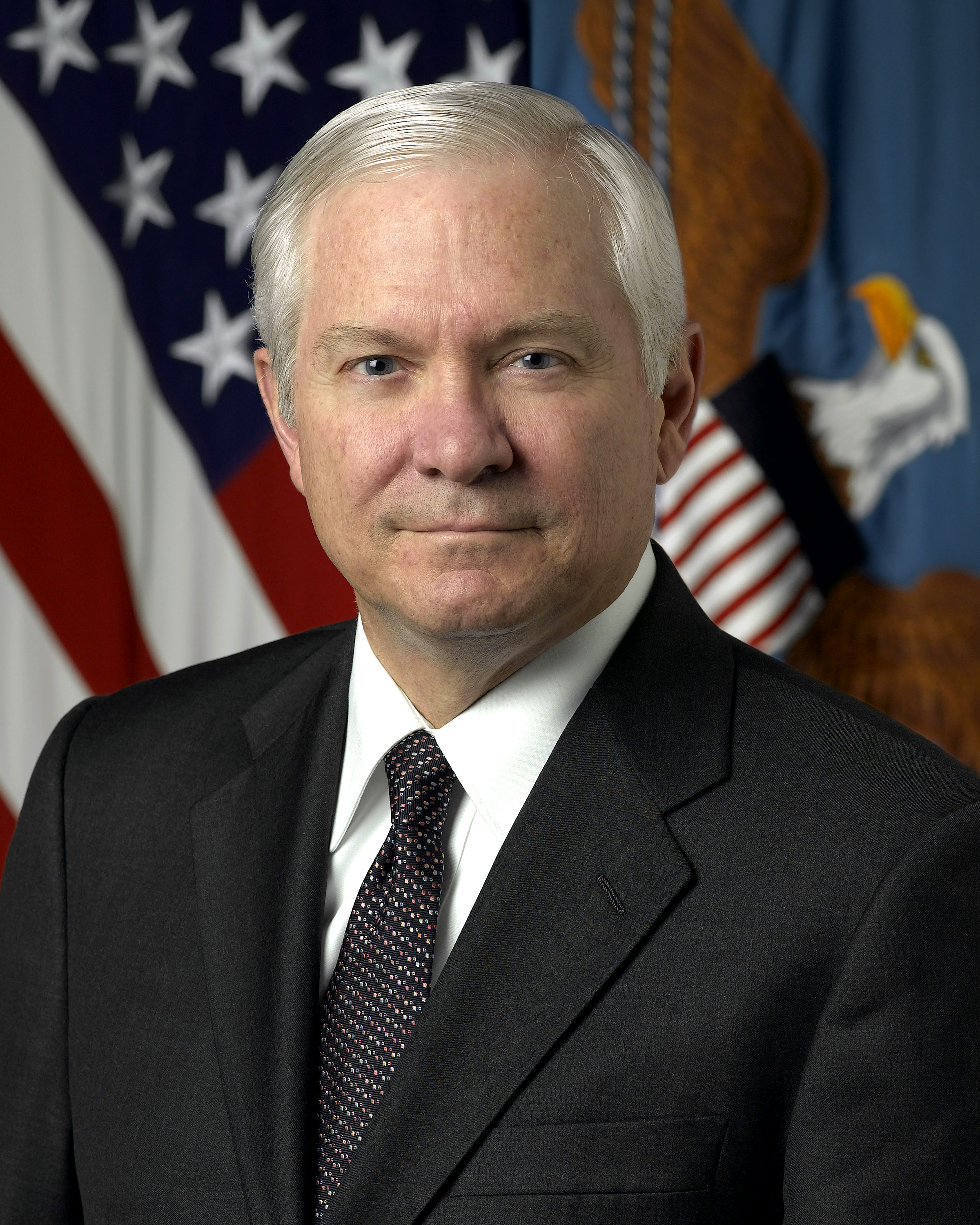
Robert Gates

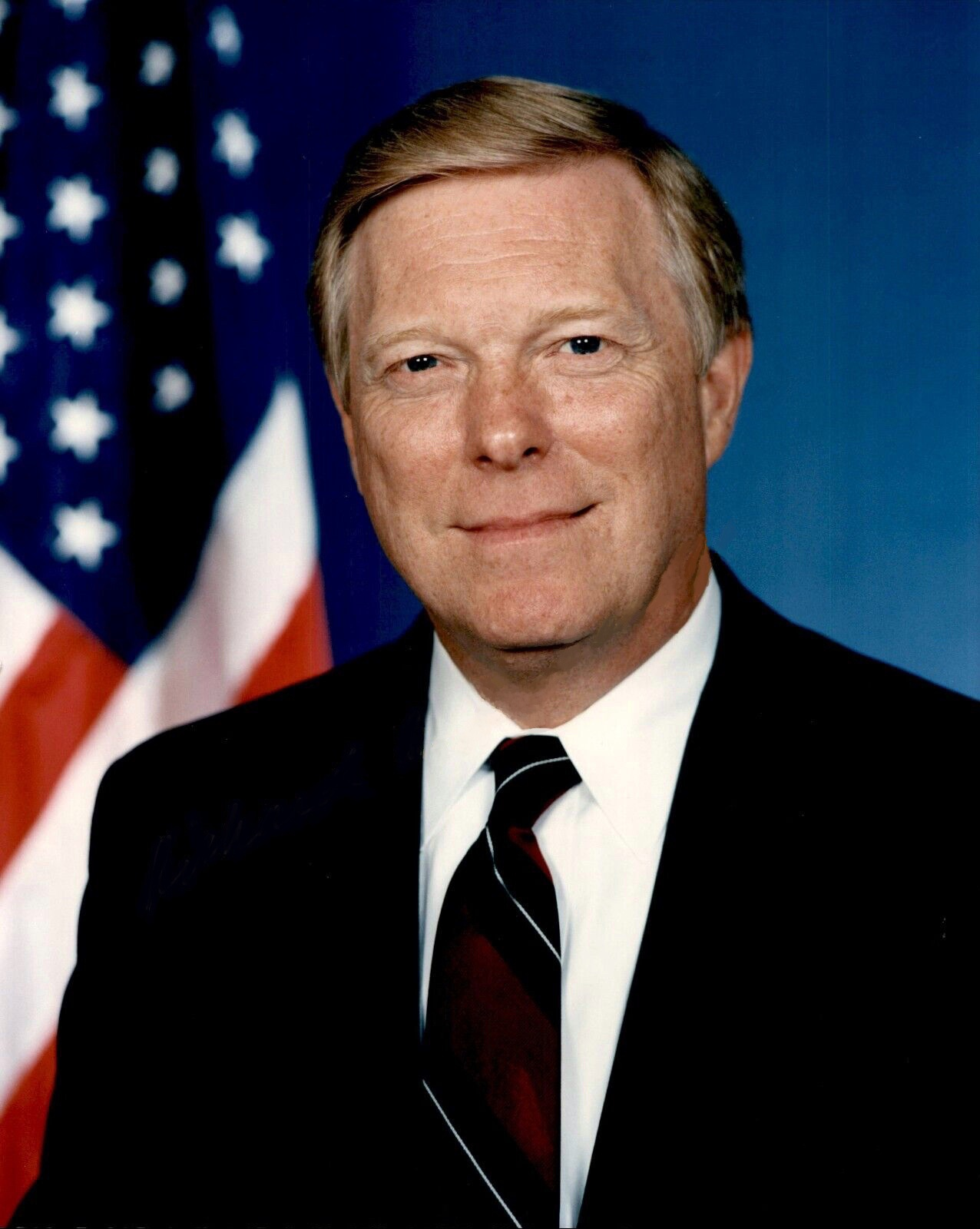
Dick Gephardt

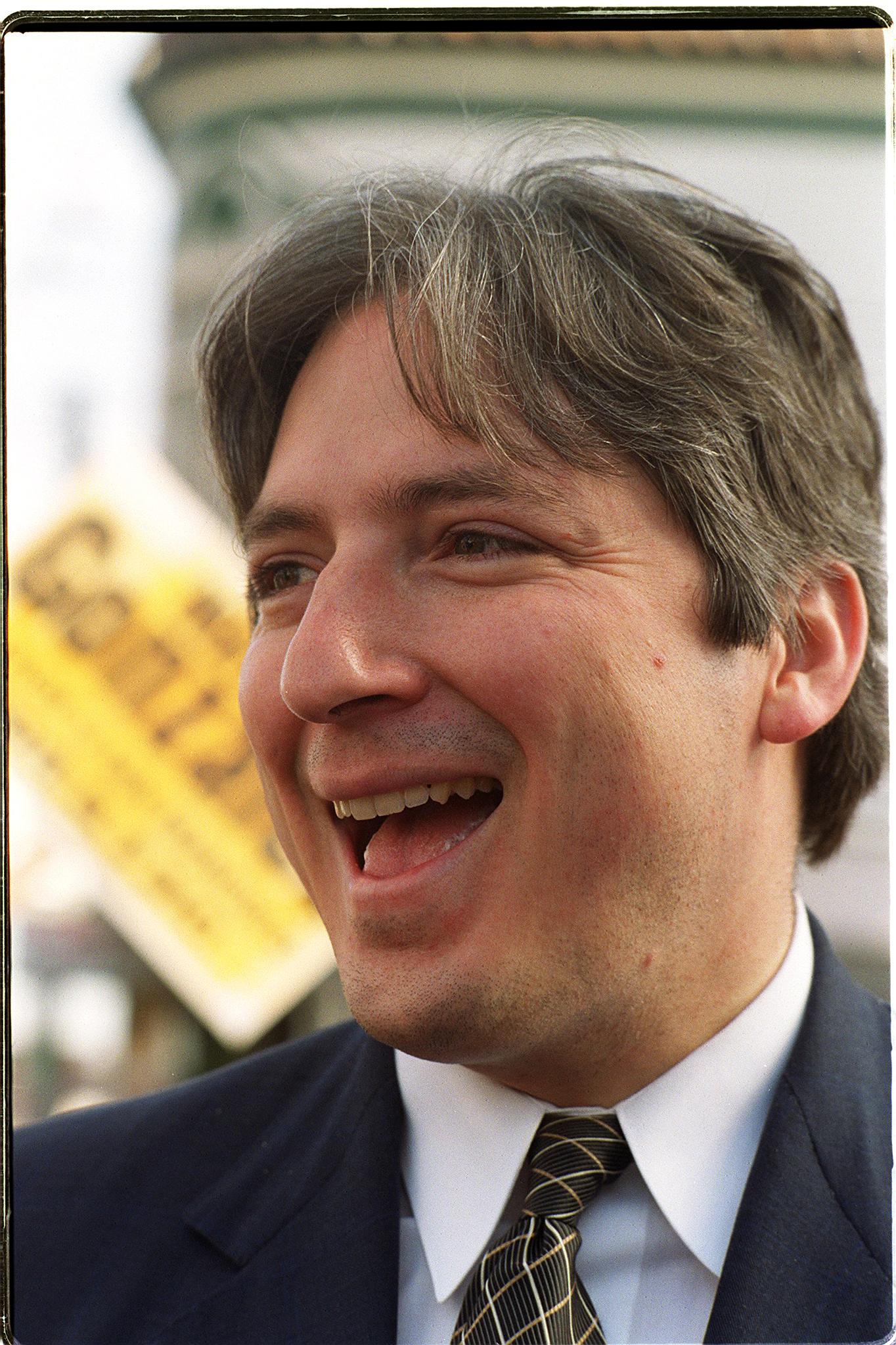
Matt Gonzalez

=== H ===
| Name | Eagle Scout | Awards | Notability | References |
|---|---|---|---|---|
| Loren D. Hagen † | 1962 c. | | Medal of Honor recipient (posthumous) | |
| David Hahn † | 1994 | | "Radioactive Boy Scout" who attempted to build a nuclear reactor at age seventeen | |
| H. R. Haldeman † | 1942 c. | | White House Chief of Staff (1969–1973) | |
| Bob Hall | 1959 c. | | Member of the Texas State Senate | |
| Dan Halloran | 1989 | | Member of the New York City Council | |
| Carter Ham | 1964 | Distinguished Eagle Scout Award | United States Army general | ^{[a]} |
| John Hammergren | 1975 | | Chairman, president and CEO of McKesson Corporation | |
| William Hanna † | 1924 | Distinguished Eagle Scout Award | Animator, director, producer, cartoon artist, and co-founder of Hanna-Barbera | ^{[a]} |
| Jacob Hannemann | 2007 c. | | Baseball player | |
| Zenon C.R. Hansen † | 1921 | Distinguished Eagle Scout Award | Chairman and CEO of Mack Trucks (1965–1974) | ^{[a]} |
| John M. Harbert † | 1937 | Distinguished Eagle Scout Award | Businessman who founded Harbert Management Corporation | ^{[a]} |
| James A. Harrell, III | 1991 | | Attorney and North Carolina politician | |
| James A. Harrell, Jr. | 1962 | | Dentist and North Carolina politician | |
| Josh Hart | 2013 | | NBA player for the New York Knicks, 2026 NBA Champions; Villanova University, 2016 NCAA Champions | |
| Michael S. Hart † | 1965 c. | | Author, creator of the eBook, founder of Project Gutenberg | |
| Steve Hartman | 1981 c. | | Journalist with the CBS News | |
| William W. Hartzog † | 1956 | Distinguished Eagle Scout Award | U.S. Army general; CEO of Burdeshaw Associates; member of the Board of Directors of the Army Historical Foundation; member of the Defense Science Board | ^{[a]} |
| Alfred Harvey † | 1929 c. | | Founder of Harvey Comics | |
| John Briggs Hayes † | 1940 | Distinguished Eagle Scout Award | Commandant of the United States Coast Guard (1978–1982) | ^{[a]} |
| J. D. Hayworth | 1973 | | Representative from Arizona (1995–2007); television and radio journalist | |
| Jon Heder | 1994 | | Actor, filmmaker and screenwriter best known for Napoleon Dynamite | |
| Jeb Hensarling | 1971 | | Representative from Texas (2003–2019) | |
| Richard Herman | 1956 | Distinguished Eagle Scout Award | Chancellor of the University of Illinois at Urbana–Champaign (2005–) | ^{[a]} |
| Robert T. Herres † | 1946 | Distinguished Eagle Scout Award | Chairman of USAA Group (1993–2002); Air Force general who was the first Vice Chairman of the Joint Chiefs of Staff, first commander of the United States Space Command, astronaut and flight crew chief of the canceled Manned Orbiting Laboratory; recipient of the Silver Buffalo Award | ^{[a]} |
| Dudley R. Herschbach | 1946 | Distinguished Eagle Scout Award | Frank B. Baird Jr. Professor of Science at Harvard University; won the 1986 Nobel Prize in Chemistry | ^{[a]} |
| John Hersey † | 1929 c. | | Journalist, novelist, and professor noted for his account of the aftermath of the atomic bomb dropped on Hiroshima, Japan | |
| Jason Hewlett | 1993 | NESA Outstanding Eagle Scout Award | Impressionist, actor, and writer | |
| William G. Higgs | 1967 | Distinguished Eagle Scout Award | Energy executive | ^{[a]} |
| French Hill | 1972 | Distinguished Eagle Scout Award | Banking executive; U.S. Representative from Arkansas (2015– ) | ^{[a]} |
| William "Green Bar Bill" Hillcourt † | 1918 | Distinguished Eagle Scout Award | Danish Knight-Scout considered to be the father of American Boy Scouting and the Scoutmaster to the World due to his prolific writings and teachings in the areas of troop and patrol structure, training, and the development of the original American adaptation of the Wood Badge program | ^{[a]} |
| Rick Hillenbrand | 1972 c. | | Member of the West Virginia House of Representatives | |
| Gary Hirte | 2002 | | Murderer of Glenn Kopitske | |
| David Hittner | 1955 c. | | Senior United States district judge; Army captain | |
| Mark Hofmann | 1970 c. | | Forger and murderer | |
| Jeffrey A. Hoffman | 1960 c. | | Co-director of the Massachusetts Space Grant Consortium at MIT's Department of Aeronautics and Astronautics; astronaut who flew on shuttle missions STS-51-D, STS-35, STS-46, STS-61 and STS-75 | ^{[f]} |
| Steven Holcomb † | 1996 c. | | Olympic bobsledder | |
| Jeffrey R. Holland † | 1955 | Distinguished Eagle Scout Award | Member of the Quorum of the Twelve of the Church of Jesus Christ of Latter-day Saints; 9th president of Brigham Young University | ^{[a]} |
| Matthew S. Holland | 1980 | NESA Outstanding Eagle Scout Award | President of Utah Valley University (2009-2018) | |
| Elijah Hood | 2014 | | Professional football player for the XFL's Los Angeles Wildcats | |
| George Hooks | 1961 | Distinguished Eagle Scout Award | Georgia State Senator (1991– ) | ^{[a]} |
| L. Ron Hubbard † | 1924 | | Pulp fiction and science fiction writer and founder of Scientology and Dianetics | |
| Donald Keith Hummel | 1965 | Distinguished Eagle Scout Award | Roman Catholic priest of the Archdiocese of Newark | |
| Hal Hunter † | 1950 c. | | American football coach | |
| Howard W. Hunter † | 1923 | Distinguished Eagle Scout Award | 14th President of the Church of Jesus Christ of Latter-day Saints | ^{[a]} |
| Jon Huntsman Jr. | 1975 | Distinguished Eagle Scout Award | 16th governor of Utah, 9th ambassador to China, 11th U.S. ambassador to Singapore | |

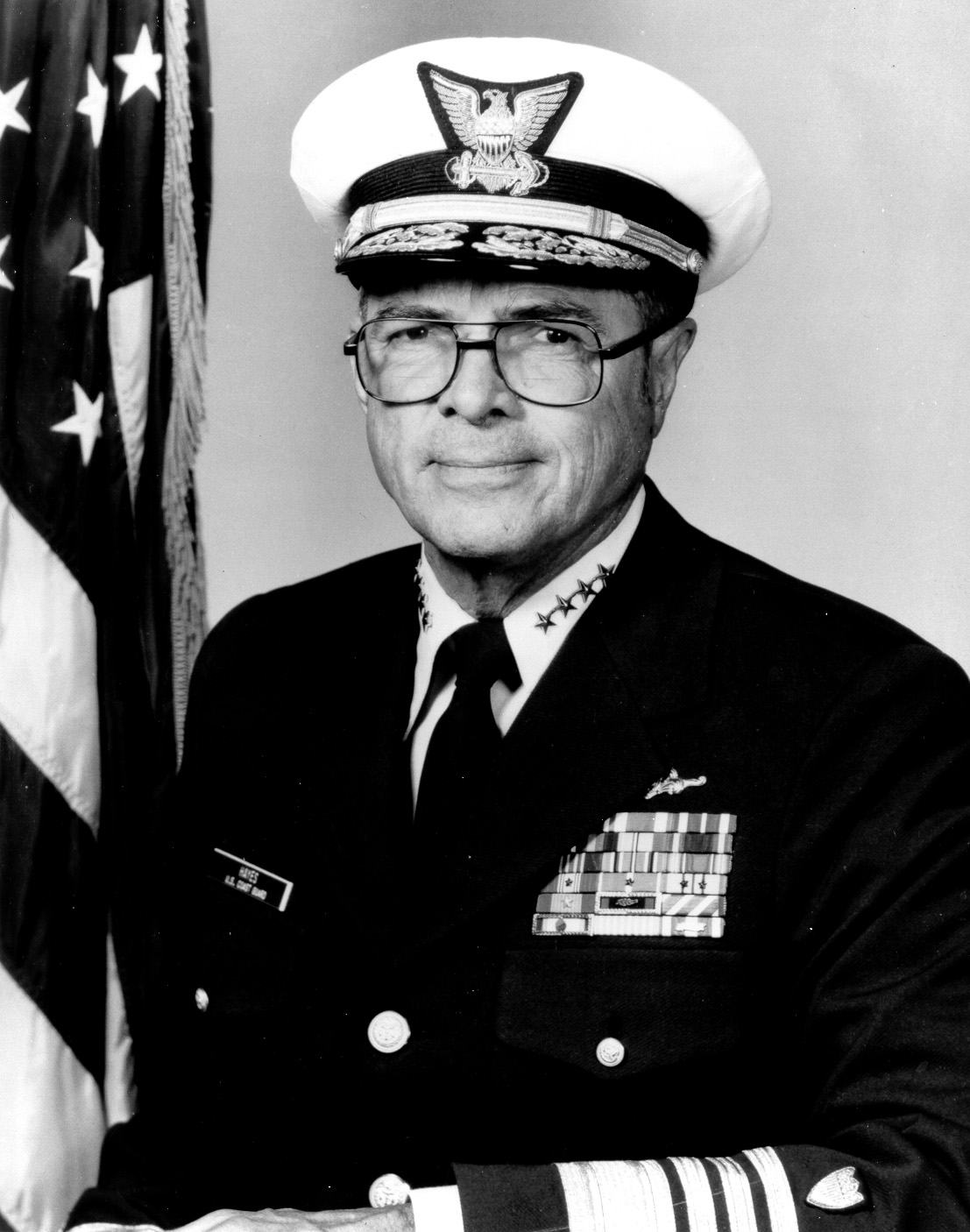
John Hayes

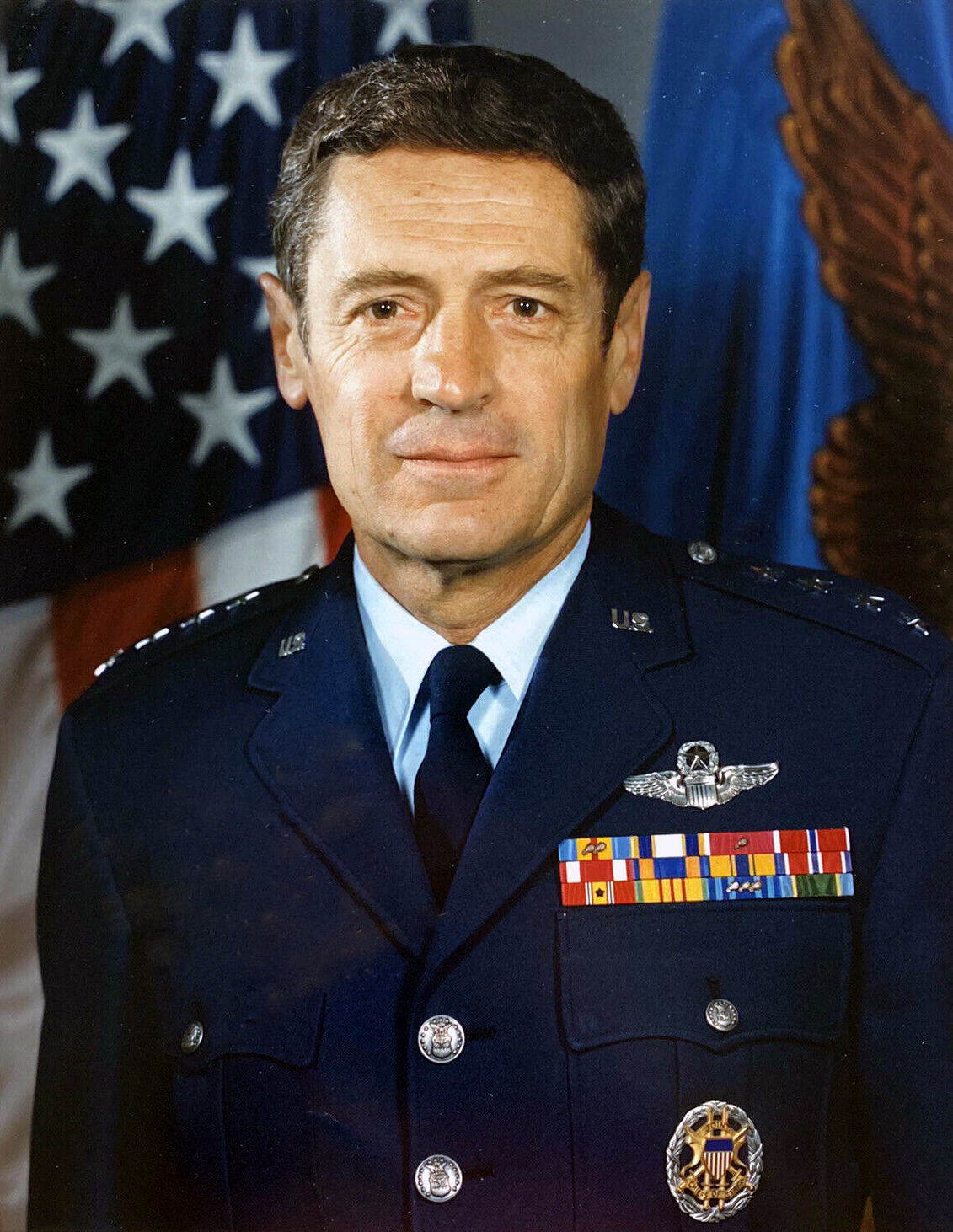
General Robert Herres

"Green Bar Bill" Hillcourt with Baden-Powell

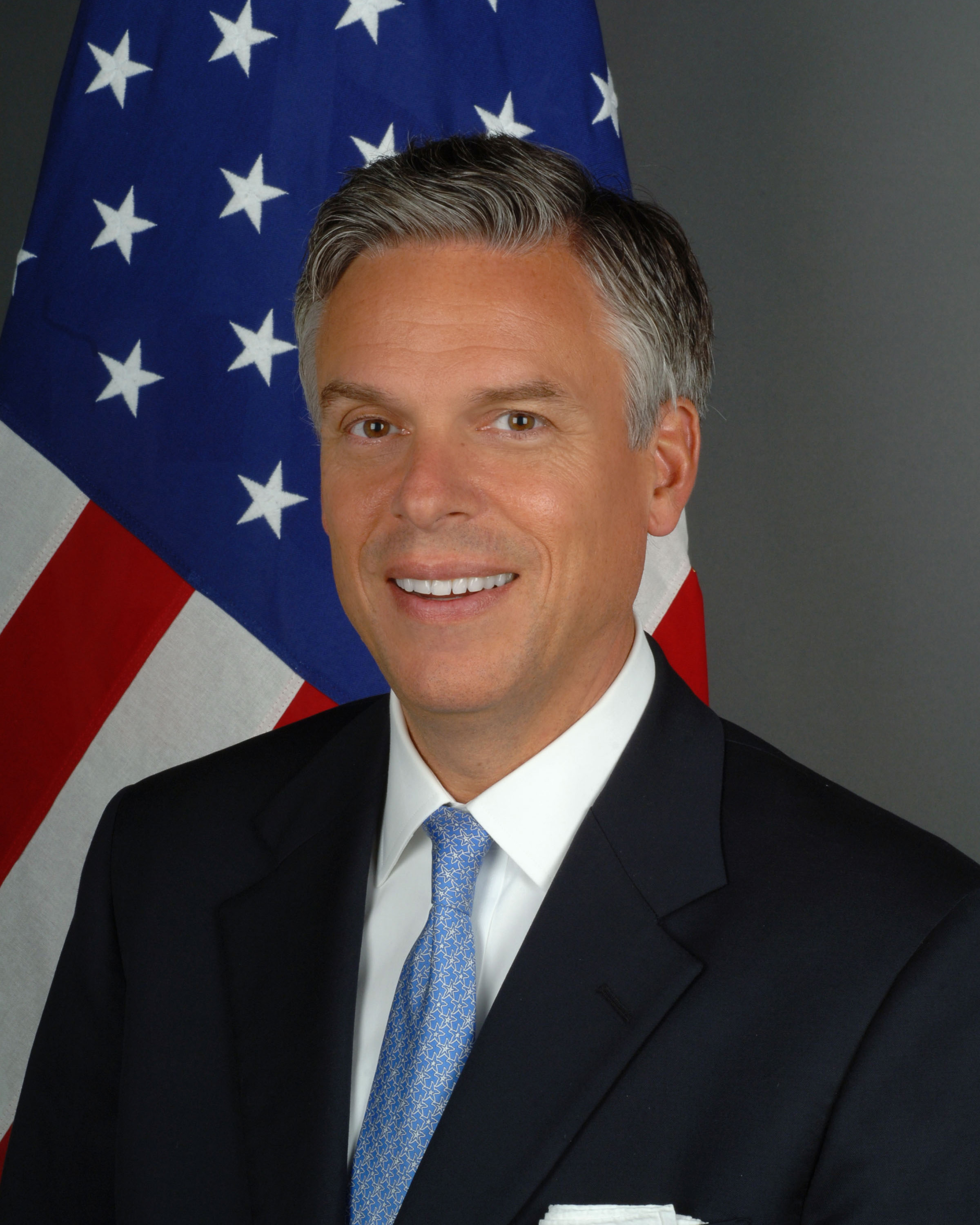
Jon M. Huntsman Jr.

=== I ===
| Name | Eagle Scout | Awards | Notability | References |
|---|---|---|---|---|
| John C. Inglis | 1961 | Distinguished Eagle Scout Award | U.S. National Cyber Director; Deputy Director of the National Security Agency | |

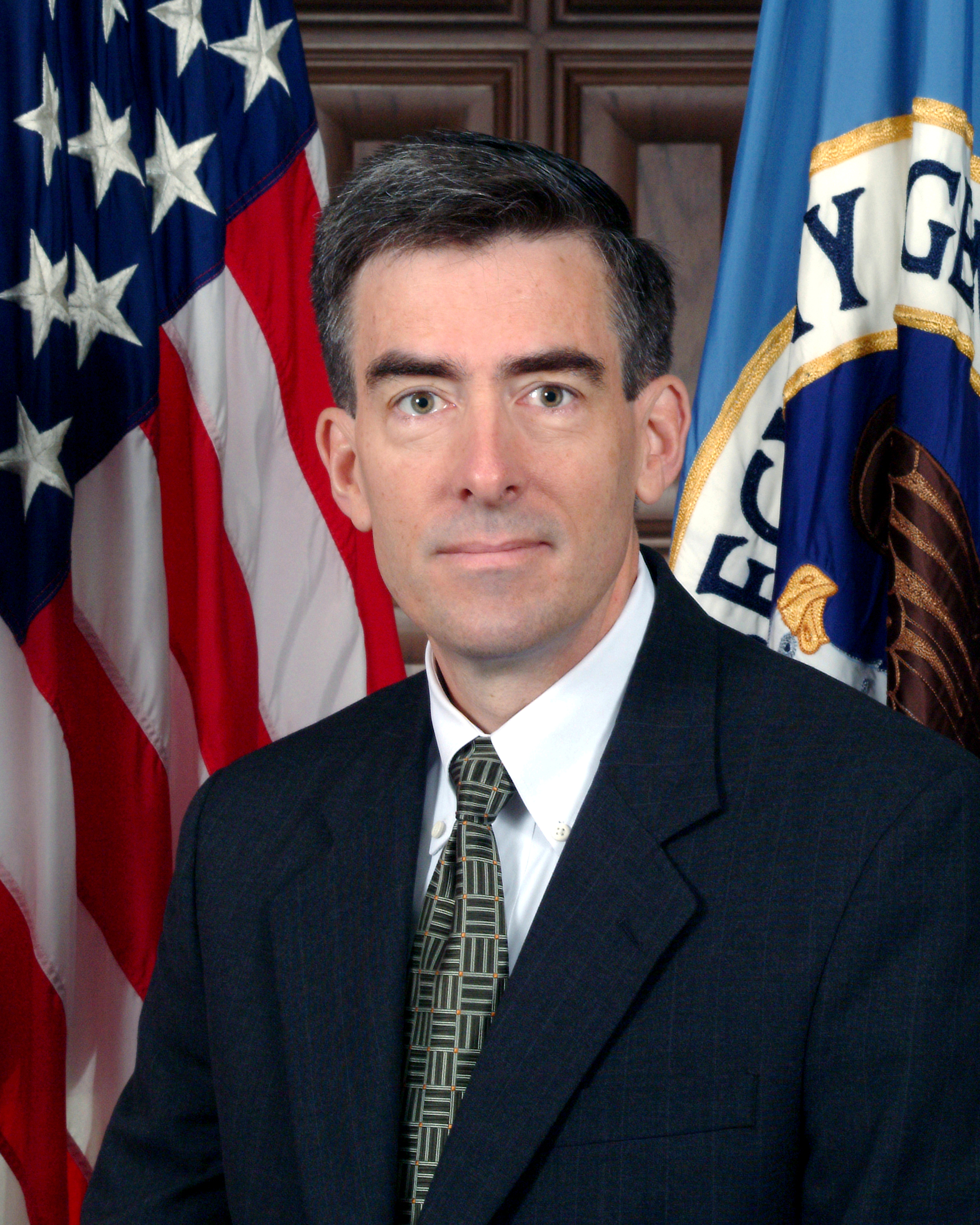
John Inglis

=== J ===
| Name | Eagle Scout | Awards | Notability | References |
|---|---|---|---|---|
| James Jabara † | 1939 c. | | US Air Force Colonel. Triple jet fighter ace. | |
| Grant James | 2003 | | Rower who competed in the 2012 Summer Olympics | |
| Ross James | 2003 | | Rower who competed in the 2012 Summer Olympics | |
| Larry Janesky | 1980 c. | NESA Outstanding Eagle Scout Award | Founder and CEO of Connecticut Basement Systems and other companies | |
| Gregory H. Johnson | 1978 c. | | Astronaut who flew on shuttle mission STS-123 | ^{[f]} |
| Jay L. Johnson | 1960 | Distinguished Eagle Scout Award | Navy admiral and fighter pilot, 26th Chief of Naval Operations (1996–2000) | ^{[a]} |
| James Vann Johnston Jr. | 1975 c. | | Roman Catholic Bishop of Springfield-Cape Girardeau | |
| E. Fay Jones † | 1937 c. | | Navy pilot during World War II; architect and designer; apprentice of Frank Lloyd Wright; University of Arkansas School of Architecture is named in his honor | |
| Thomas David Jones | 1969 | Distinguished Eagle Scout Award | Astronaut who flew on shuttle missions STS-59, STS-68 and STS-80 | ^{[f]} |
| Darwin Judge † | 1971 | | Marine who was an embassy security guard and was one of the last two US servicemen killed in the Vietnam War | |

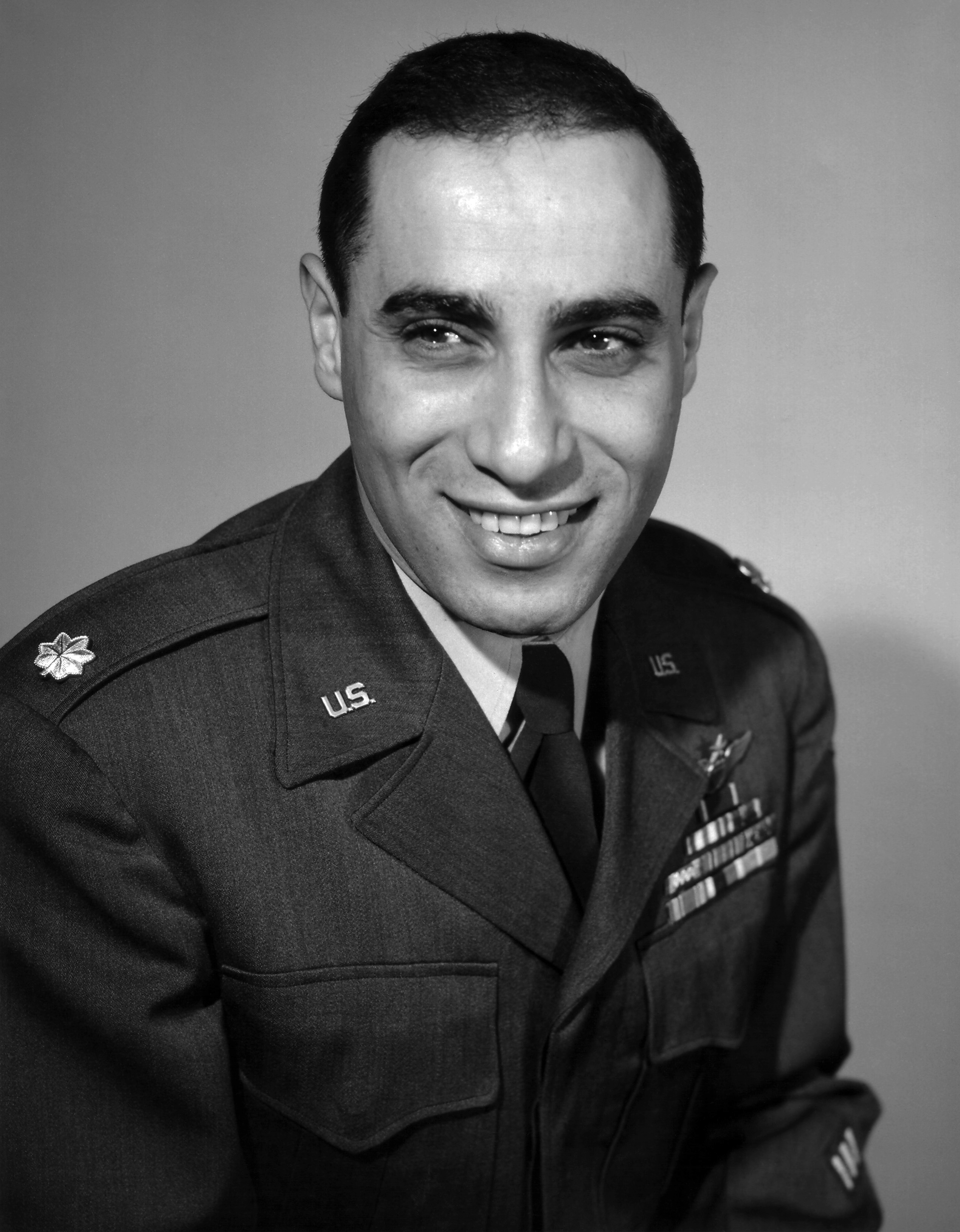
James Jabara

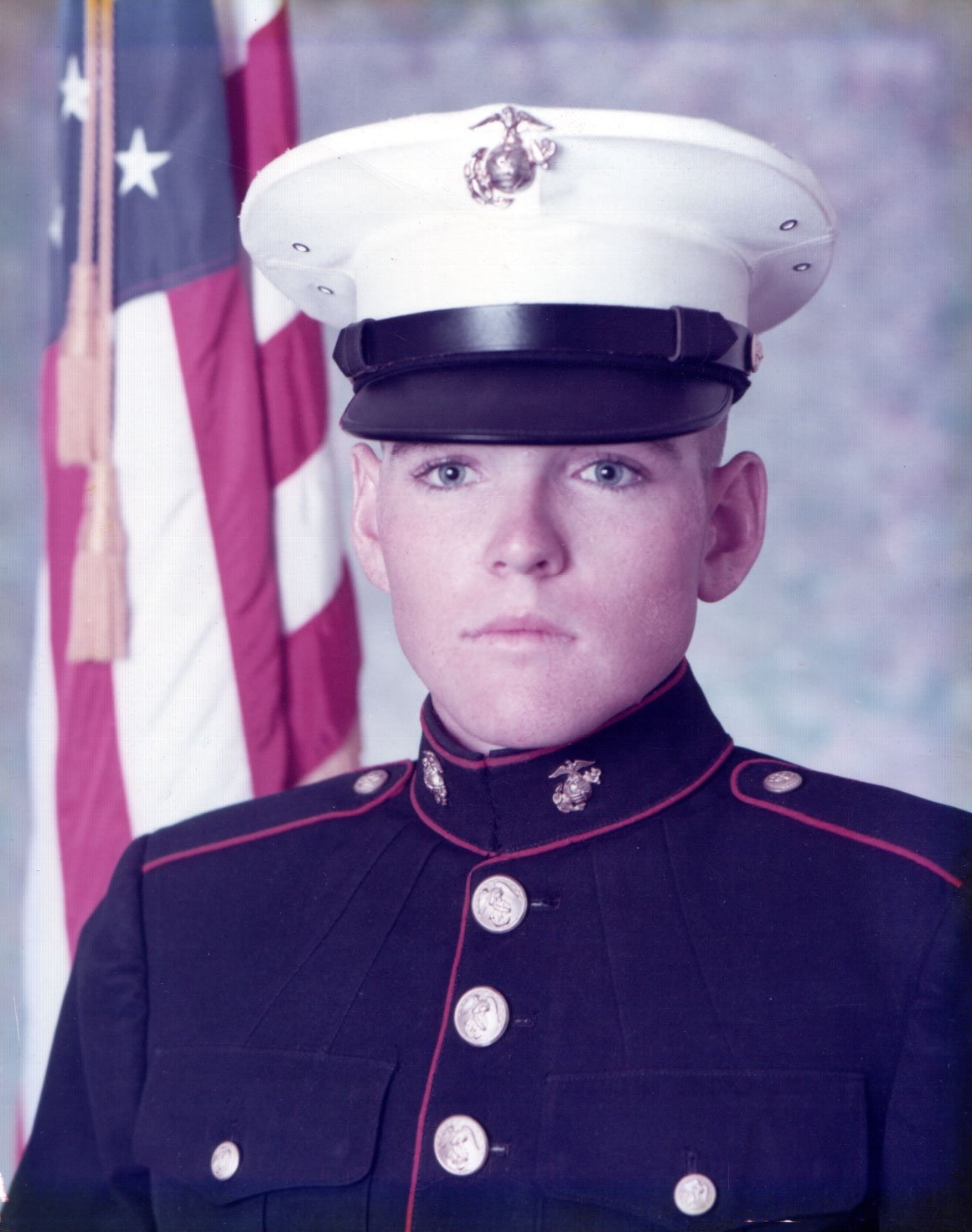
Darwin Judge

=== K ===
| Name | Eagle Scout | Awards | Notability | References |
|---|---|---|---|---|
| Jeremy Kapinos | 2000 c. | | Collegiate (Penn State) and professional (New York Jets, Green Bay Packers, Indianapolis Colts, Pittsburgh Steelers) American football player | |
| Ewing Kauffman † | 1931 | Distinguished Eagle Scout Award | Founder of Marion Laboratories and owner of the Kansas City Royals | ^{[a]} |
| John C. Keegan | 1966 | Distinguished Eagle Scout Award NESA Outstanding Eagle Scout Award | Retired judge, military officer and political leader. NOESA 2013; DES 2016 | |
| William Henry Keeler † | 1952 | Distinguished Eagle Scout Award | Cardinal Archbishop of Baltimore | ^{[a]} |
| Darren Kimura | 1992 | | American businessman, inventor, and investor, known for inventing MicroCSP solar technology | |
| Peter Kinder | 1969 | Distinguished Eagle Scout Award | Lieutenant governor of Missouri (2005–2017) | ^{[a]} |
| Alfred Kinsey † | 1913 | | Biologist and professor of entomology and zoology who is known for his research on human sexuality | |
| Charlie Kirk † | 2011 | | American political activist. Founder of Turning Point USA | |
| Herb Kirsh † | 1943 | NESA Outstanding Eagle Scout Award | Member of the South Carolina House of Representatives (1978-2010) | |
| Johannes Knoops | 1980 | | Rome Prize Fellow in Architecture American Academy in Rome and distinguished educator | |
| Harry Knowles | 1987 | | Internet film critic | |
| Jon Koncak | 1977 | | Professional basketball player for the Atlanta Hawks and the Orlando Magic (1985–1996) | ^{[d]} |
| Roy Kramer † | 1946 | Distinguished Eagle Scout Award | Commissioner of the Southeastern Conference from 1990 to 2002 where he created the Bowl Championship Series | |
| Roger Krone | 1973 | | President and CEO of the Boy Scouts of America | |

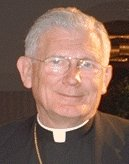
William Keeler

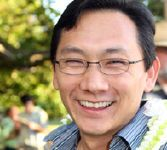
Darren Kimura

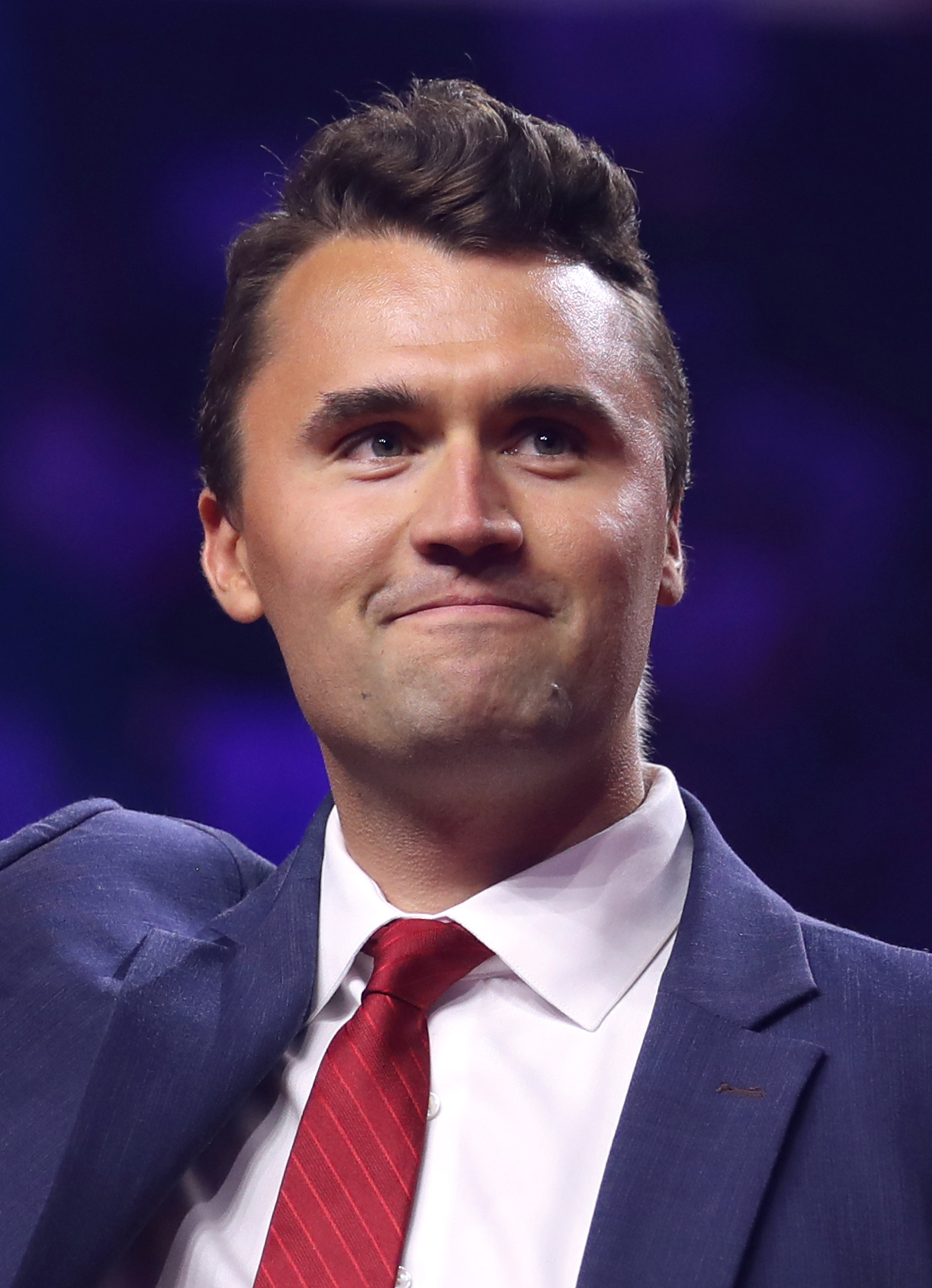
Charlie Kirk

=== L ===
| Name | Eagle Scout | Awards | Notability | References |
|---|---|---|---|---|
| I. Beverly Lake † | 1949 | Distinguished Eagle Scout Award | Jurist and public official; Associate Justice of the North Carolina Supreme Court (1994–2000); Chief Justice of the North Carolina Supreme Court (2000–2006) | ^{[a]} |
| Kent Lambert | 1968 c. | | Member of the Colorado Senate (2011–2019) and Colorado House of Representatives (2007–2011) | |
| Carl T. Langford † | 1934 | Distinguished Eagle Scout Award | Mayor of Orlando, Florida (1967–1980) | ^{[a]} |
| Edward Lansdale † | 1926 c. | | U.S. Air Force Major General, counterinsurgency expert | |
| Charles R. Larson † | 1950 | Distinguished Eagle Scout Award | Navy admiral; submariner; twice Superintendent of the United States Naval Academy (1983–1986) and (1994–1998); commander United States Pacific Command; member of the board of Northrop Grumman | ^{[a]} |
| Greg Lashutka | 1958 | Distinguished Eagle Scout Award | Lawyer; 51st Mayor of Columbus, Ohio; American Football League player for the Buffalo Bills (1966) | ^{[a]} |
| Mike Leach † | 1975 | | College football coach at Texas Tech (2000-2009), Washington State (2012-2019), and Mississippi State (2020-2022) | |
| Lucian Leape † | 1946 | Distinguished Eagle Scout Award | Physician and professor at Harvard School of Public Health | ^{[a]} |
| Mark C. Lee | 1968 c. | | Air Force colonel and astronaut who flew on shuttle missions STS-30, STS-47, STS-64, and STS-82 | ^{[f]} |
| Mike Lee | 1989 | NESA Outstanding Eagle Scout Award | Attorney and Senator from Utah (2011–present) | ^{[a]} |
| David Leebron | 1973 c. | | Lawyer; academic, 7th president of Rice University | |
| Sheldon Leonard † | 1923 c. | | Pioneering film and television producer, director, writer, and actor | |
| Andy Lewis † | 2002 | | World champion in slacklining with three Guinness World Records; performed at Super Bowl XLVI | |
| Trey Lewis | 2003 | | Collegiate (Washburn) and professional (Atlanta Falcons, Omaha Nighthawks) American football player | |
| Howard Lincoln | 1955 | Distinguished Eagle Scout Award | CEO of Seattle Mariners baseball team; chairman of Nintendo of America; in 1956 he posed as one of the Boy Scouts for The Scoutmaster painting by Norman Rockwell | ^{[a]} |
| Don L. Lind † | 1945 | | Astronaut who flew Spacelab mission STS-51-B | ^{[f]} |
| Kjell N. Lindgren | 1988 | | Astronaut who flew on Soyuz TMA-17M (Expedition 44/45) | |
| Steven Lindsey | 1976 | Distinguished Eagle Scout Award | Air Force colonel; astronaut who flew on shuttle missions STS-87, STS-95, and STS-104 | ^{[f]} |
| Larry Liston | 1968 c. | | Member of the Colorado House of Representatives (2005–2013, 2017–2021); Colorado Senate (2021–) | |
| Gary Locke | 1964 | Distinguished Eagle Scout Award | 10th United States Ambassador to People's Republic of China; 36th U.S. Secretary of Commerce; lawyer; 21st Governor of Washington | ^{[a]}^{[e]} |
| Kevin Kwan Loucks | 2000 | | CEO of Chamber Music America; co-founder of Chamber Music OC, member of classical music ensemble Trio Céleste | |
| Jim Lovell † | 1943 | Distinguished Eagle Scout Award | Astronaut who flew on missions Gemini 7, Gemini 12, Apollo 8, and Apollo 13, president of National Eagle Scout Association | ^{[a]}^{[e]}^{[d]} |
| James Loy † | 1959 | Distinguished Eagle Scout Award | Commandant of the Coast Guard (1998–2002); Deputy Secretary of the Department of Homeland Security (DHS) (2003–2005); first administrator of the Transportation Security Administration | ^{[a]} |
| Richard Lugar † | 1946 | Distinguished Eagle Scout Award | Senator from Indiana (1977–2013) | ^{[a]}^{[a]}^{[e]} |
| Deuce Lutui | 1999 | | Offensive lineman for the Arizona Cardinals (2006–2011) | |
| David Lynch † | 1962 | | Academy Award and Palme d'Or winning filmmaker and actor | |
| Thomas J. Lynch † | 1936 c. | | United States Army Air Forces lieutenant colonel and World War II flying ace. Lynch scored 20 aerial victories before he was killed in action on March 8, 1944. | |

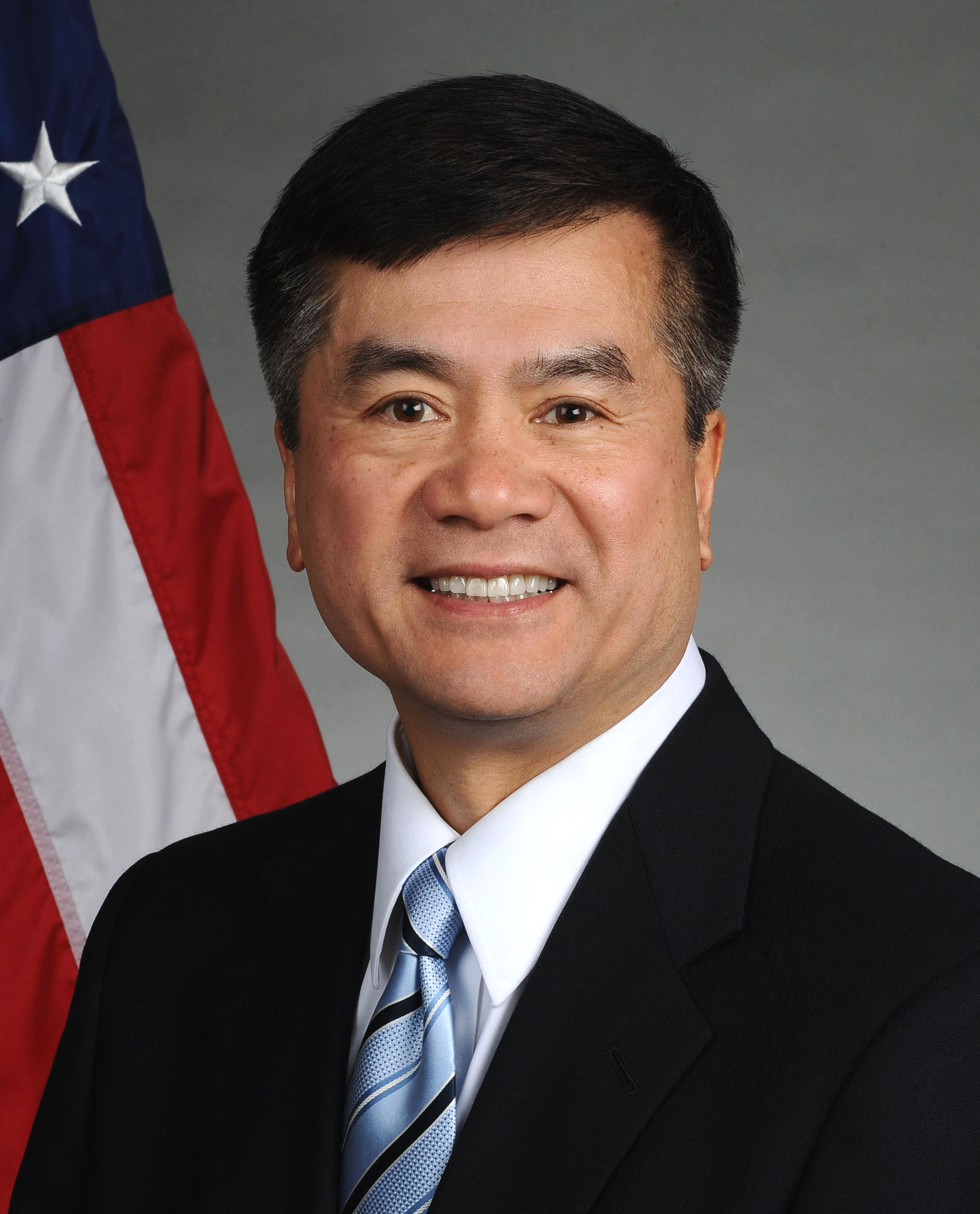
Gary Locke

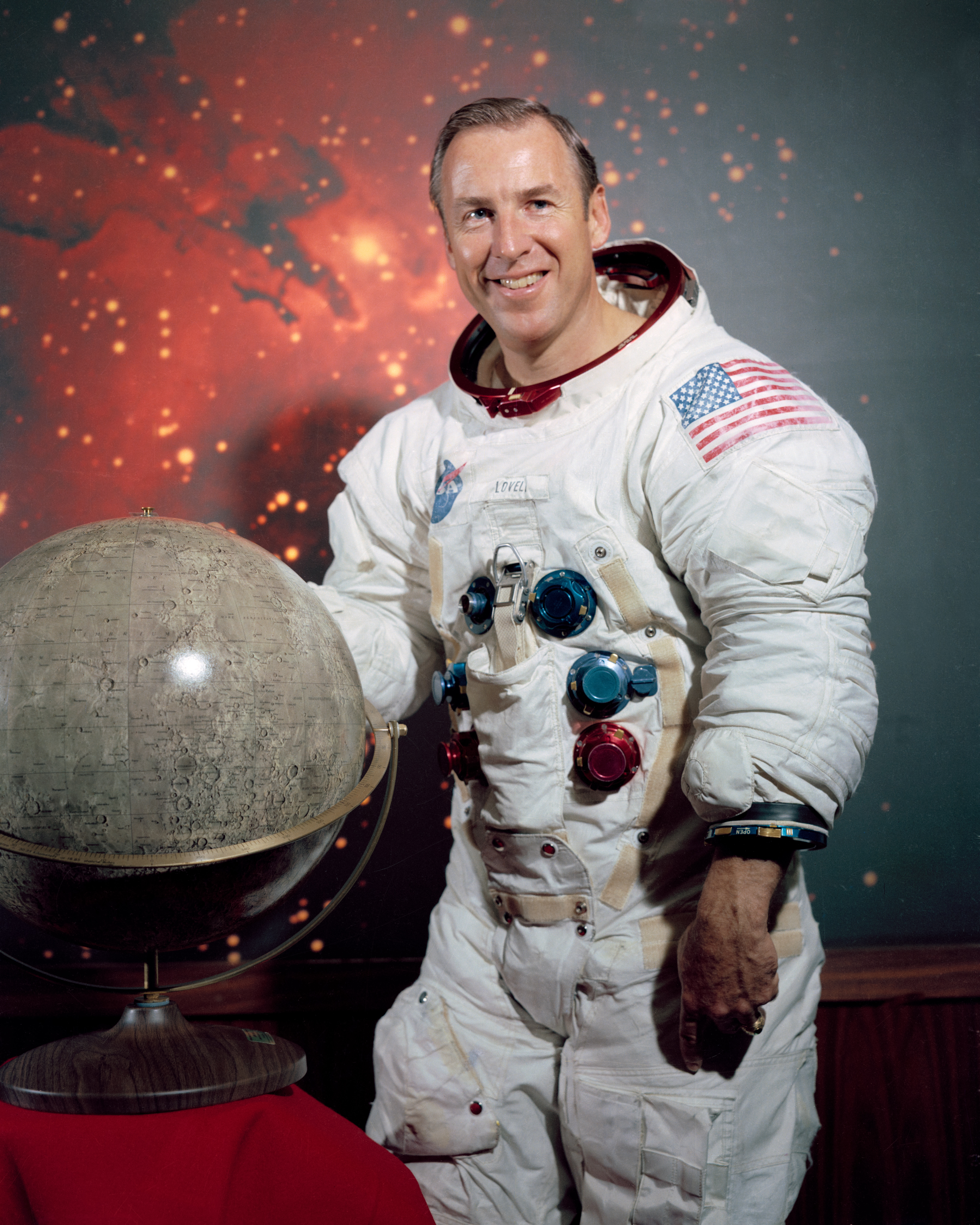
James Lovell

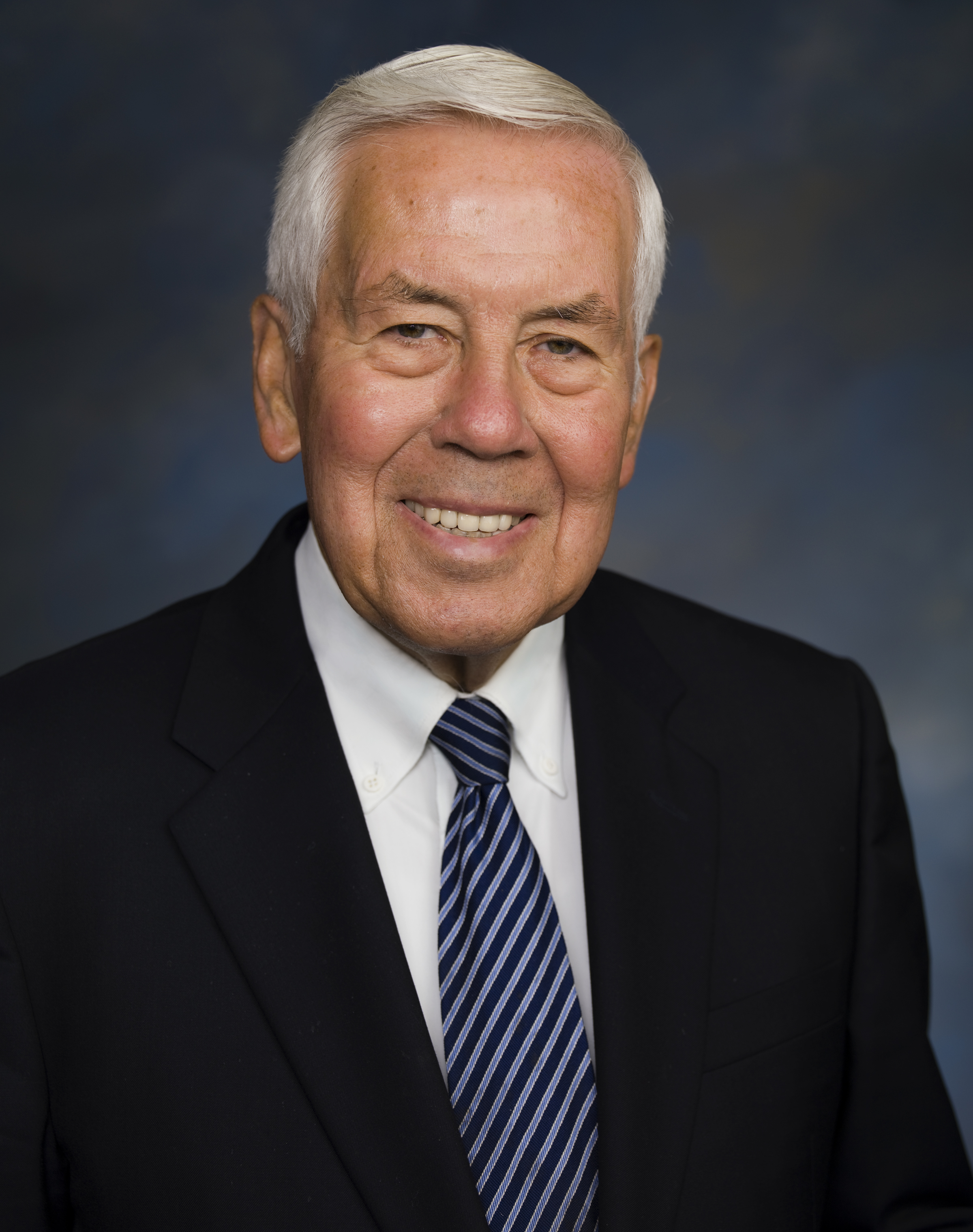
Richard Lugar

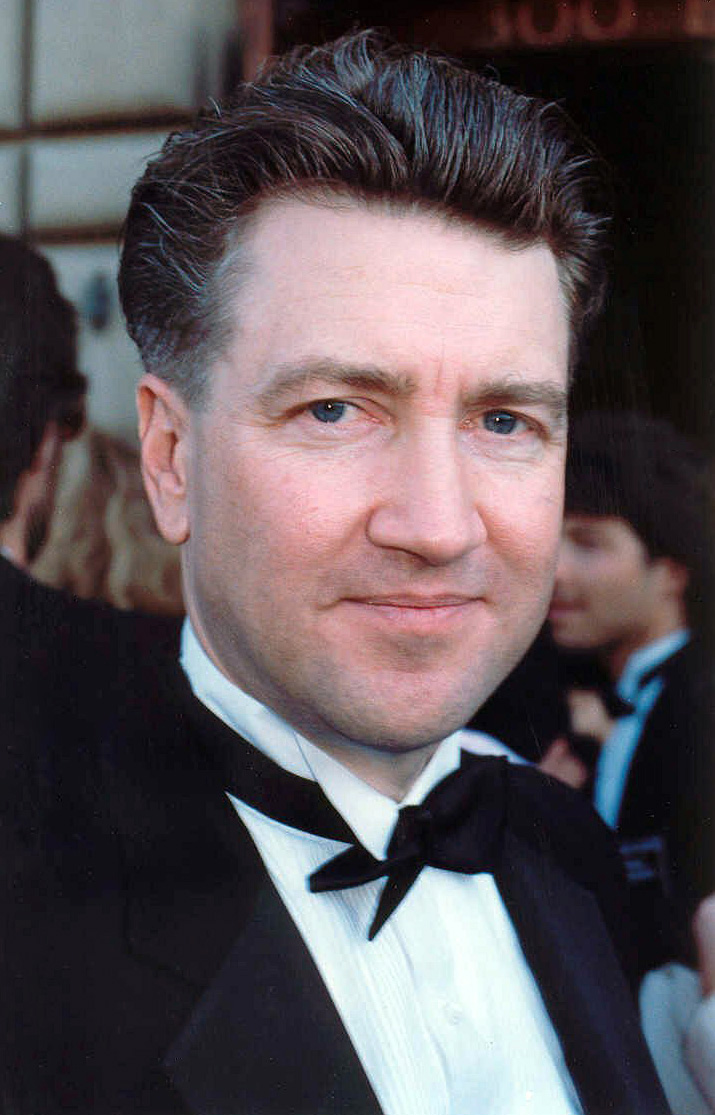
David Lynch

=== M ===
| Name | Eagle Scout | Awards | Notability | References |
|---|---|---|---|---|
| Tom Mack | 1960 | Distinguished Eagle Scout Award | Offensive left guard for Los Angeles Rams and member of Pro Football Hall of Fame | ^{[a]} |
| Mark Madsen | 1992 c. | | NBA basketball player with Minnesota Timberwolves; coach of youth basketball camp | ^{[e]} |
| Ray Malavasi † | 1944 | Distinguished Eagle Scout Award | Head coach of NFL's Denver Broncos and Los Angeles Rams | ^{[a]} |
| Charles Taylor Manatt † | 1954 | Distinguished Eagle Scout Award | Lawyer, politician and businessman; chairman of the Democratic National Committee (1981–1985); Ambassador to the Dominican Republic (1999–2001) | ^{[a]} |
| Ernest Mario † | 1954 | Distinguished Eagle Scout Award | Pharmaceutical industry executive and the recipient of the 2007 Remington Honor Medal awarded by the American Pharmacists Association | ^{[a]} |
| Walter Joseph Marm Jr. | 1958 c. | | Army colonel who received of the Medal of Honor for his actions at the Battle of Ia Drang in the Vietnam War | |
| J. W. Marriott Jr. | 1947 | Distinguished Eagle Scout Award | Chairman and CEO of Marriott International | ^{[a]}^{[e]}^{[d]} |
| Boyd Matson | 1962 | Distinguished Eagle Scout Award | Creator and host of Wild Chronicles, host of National Geographic Weekend, columnist for National Geographic Traveler and other programs. | |
| Tom Matte † | 1955 c. | | Pro Bowl and Super Bowl running back for the Baltimore Colts | |
| Mark Mays | 1998 c. | | President and CEO of Clear Channel Communications | |
| Robert J. Mazzuca | 1964 | Distinguished Eagle Scout Award | Professional Scouter and Chief Scout Executive (2007–2012) | |
| William Cameron McCool † | 1977 c. | | Pilot of the Columbia shuttle mission STS-107 | ^{[e]}^{[f]} |
| Michael J. McCulley | 1959 c. | | Chief executive officer of United Space Alliance; astronaut who flew on shuttle mission STS-104 | ^{[f]} |
| Charles T. McDowell † | 1937 c. | | Army colonel; combat paratrooper in World War II; Soviet Union scholar and professor of Russian language | |
| Charles McGee † | 1940 | Distinguished Eagle Scout Award | Tuskegee Airman and a career officer in the Air Force for 30 years; holds an Air Force record of 409 fighter combat missions flown in World War II, Korea, and Vietnam | |
| Albert H. McGeehan | 1959 | Distinguished Eagle Scout Award | Mayor of Holland, Michigan (1993–2009) | |
| Eugene McGehee † | 1945 c. | | Member of the Louisiana House of Representatives, 1960–1972; Louisiana State District Court Judge, 1972–1978 | |
| Rob McKenna | 1979 | Distinguished Eagle Scout Award | Attorney General of Washington (2005–2013) | ^{[a]} |
| Glen McLaughlin | 1949 | Distinguished Eagle Scout Award | Venture philanthropist, founder of the McLaughlin Prize for Research in Ethics in Accounting and Taxation, head of the order of the Knights of St. John | |
| Peter McLoughlin | 1971 | Distinguished Eagle Scout Award | CEO of Vulcan Sports & Entertainment; president of the National Football League's Seattle Seahawks; president of CenturyLink Field's management branch, First & Goal; serves on the Portland Trail Blazers Board of Directors | ^{[a]} |
| Sid McMath † | 1928 c. | | Decorated Marine Corps combat veteran of World War II, retired as major general; attorney; 34th Governor of Arkansas | |
| Robert McNamara † | 1932 c. | | Business executive; Secretary of Defense (1961–1968); President of the World Bank (1968–1981) | |
| Michael R. McNulty | 1963 c. | | Representative from New York (1989–2009) | |
| Roy W. Menninger † | 1941 | Distinguished Eagle Scout Award | Physician and leader of the Menninger Foundation, older brother of Walter | ^{[a]} |
| W. Walter Menninger | 1951 | Distinguished Eagle Scout Award | Physician and leader of the Menninger Foundation, younger brother of Roy | ^{[a]} |
| Jeff Merkley | 1972 c. | | Senator from Oregon (2009–present) | ^{[a]} |
| Charles D. Metcalf † | 1949 | Distinguished Eagle Scout Award | Air Force major general; director, National Museum of the United States Air Force (1996–2010) | ^{[a]} |
| George Meyer | 1973 c. | | Writer and producer of The Simpsons | |
| Edward D. Miller Jr. | 1959 | Distinguished Eagle Scout Award | Dean of the Medical faculty at Johns Hopkins University and the Chief executive officer of Johns Hopkins Medicine | ^{[a]} |
| Richards Miller | 1960 | Distinguished Eagle Scout Award | Dentist; one of the founders of Venturing; one of the authors of Wood Badge in the 21st century and the 2003 Field Book | ^{[a]} |
| Tony Miller | 1964 c. | | Lawyer; Secretary of State of California (1994–1995) | |
| Scott Mitchell | 1984 c. | | NFL quarterback (1990–2001) | |
| William E. Moerner | 1967 | Distinguished Eagle Scout Award | Physical chemist and chemical physicist; awarded the Nobel Prize in Chemistry (2014) | |
| Matt Moniz | 2012 | | American mountaineer and speaker; 2010 National Geographic Adventurer of the Year; recipient of the Outdoor Inspiration Award | |
| Lloyd Monserratt † | 1984 | | Political and community leader in California | |
| Allison Montgomery | | | Elected to the Alabama House of Representatives | |
| David Montgomery | 2014 | | Running back for the Houston Texans | |
| Dave Moody | 1978 | | Grammy nominated, Dove Award winning artist, producer, songwriter and filmmaker | |
| Jackson W. Moore | 1961 | Distinguished Eagle Scout Award | Executive Chairman of Union Planters Bank and Regions Financial Corporation | ^{[a]} |
| Michael Moore | 1970 c. | | Academy Award-winning (2002) film director, author, and social commentator | |
| Emery Moorehead | 1969 | | American football tight end/wide receiver in the National Football League for the New York Giants, Denver Broncos, and the Chicago Bears; won a Super Bowl ring as the starting tight end and a member of the 1985 Chicago Bears | |
| Jim E. Mora | 1950 | Distinguished Eagle Scout Award | Sport radio commentator and analyst. Head coach of the Colorado State Rams, Baltimore Stars, New Orleans Saints and the Indianapolis Colts | ^{[a]} |
| Howard Morland | 1958 | | Air Force pilot, journalist famous for role in United States v. Progressive, Inc. | |
| Rob Morris | 1991 c. | | Professional American football football player | |
| Bill Morrison | 1975 c. | | Cartoon illustrator; art director of Bongo Comics; creator of the mural A Century of Values celebrating the BSA's centennial | |
| John P. Morse | 1974 c. | | Member (2007–2013) and president (2013) of the Colorado Senate | |
| Merrill Moses | 1990 c. | | 3-time Olympian water polo player who won a silver medal in the 2008 Summer Olympics | |
| Brandon Mull | 1993 | | Writer who is best known as the author of the Fablehaven fantasy series | |
| Louis Murphy | 2003 c. | | Collegiate and professional American football player | |
| John Murtha † | 1948 c. | | Representative from Pennsylvania (1973–2010); Korean War-era drill instructor and later colonel in the Marine Corps; decorated war veteran of the Vietnam War | ^{[a]} |

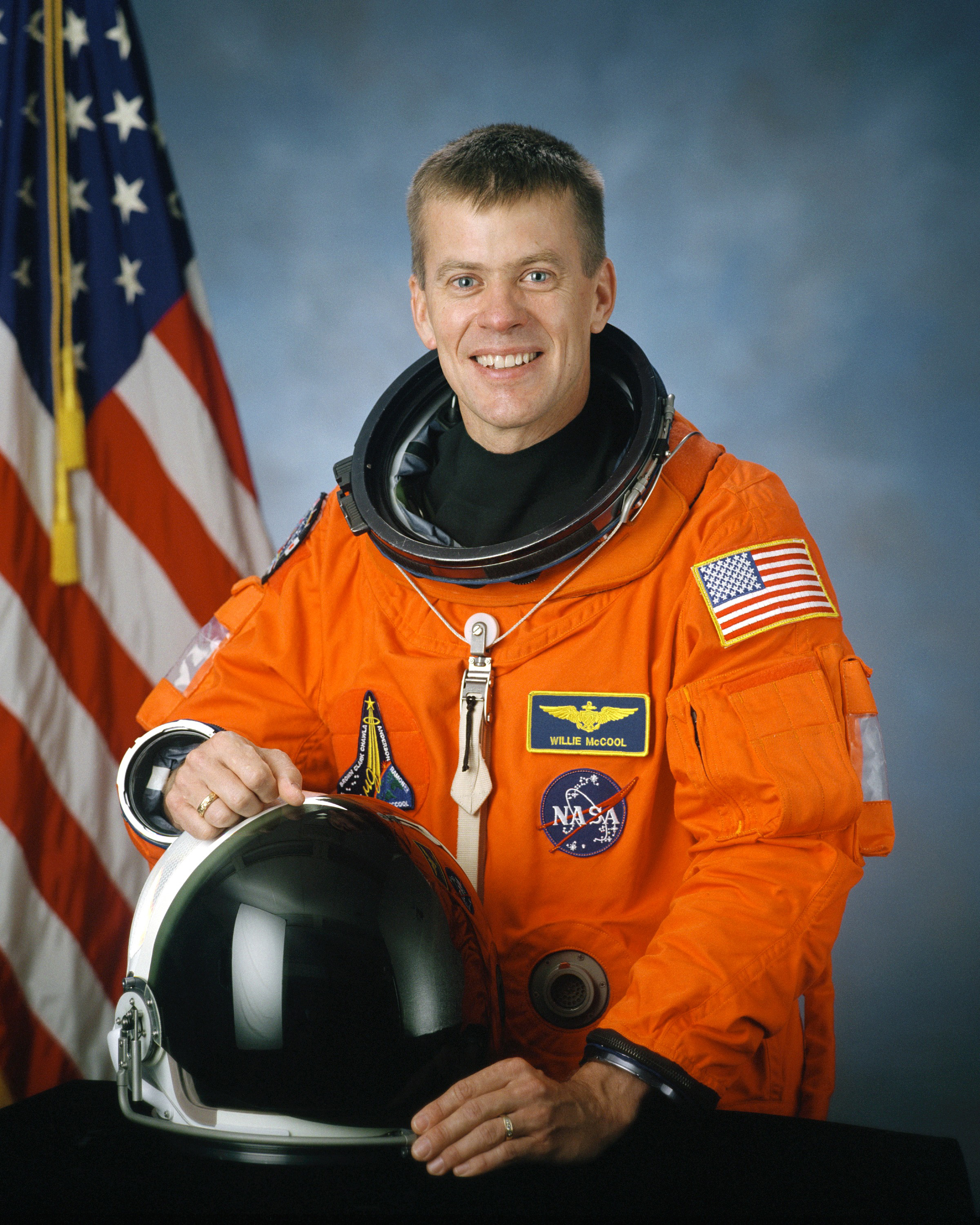
William McCool

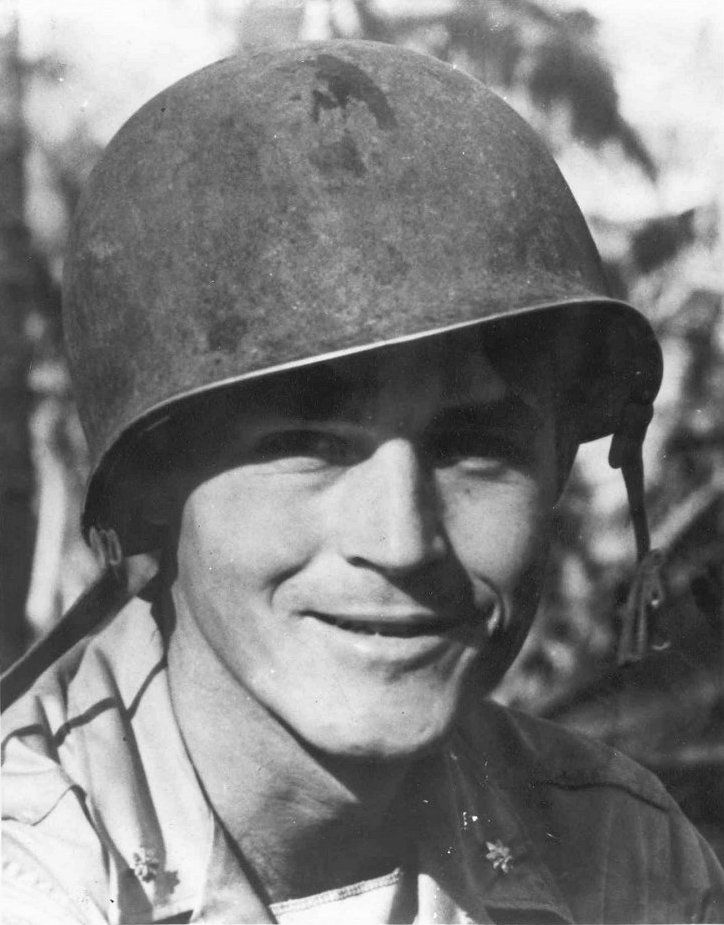
Sid McMath in World War II

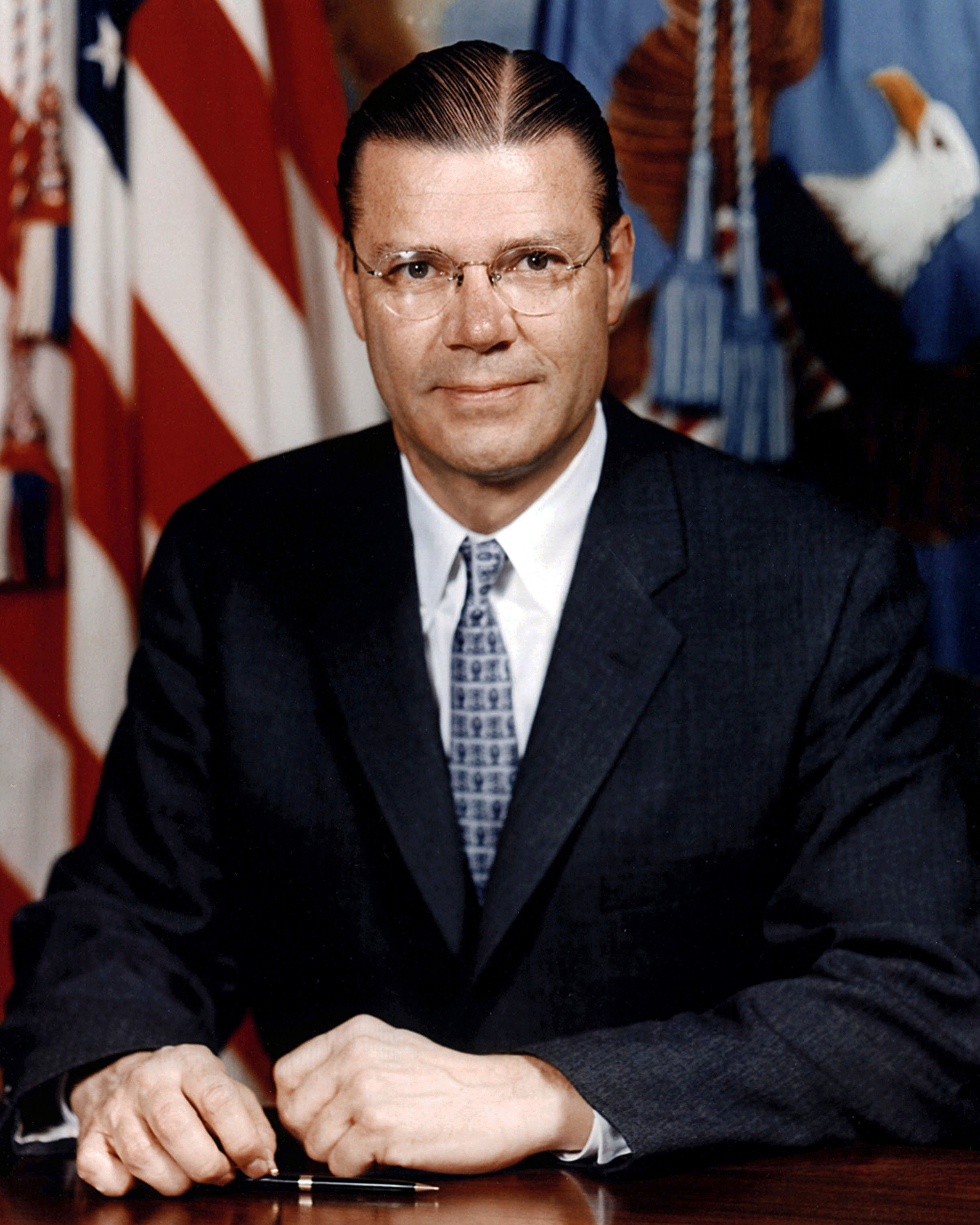
Robert McNamara

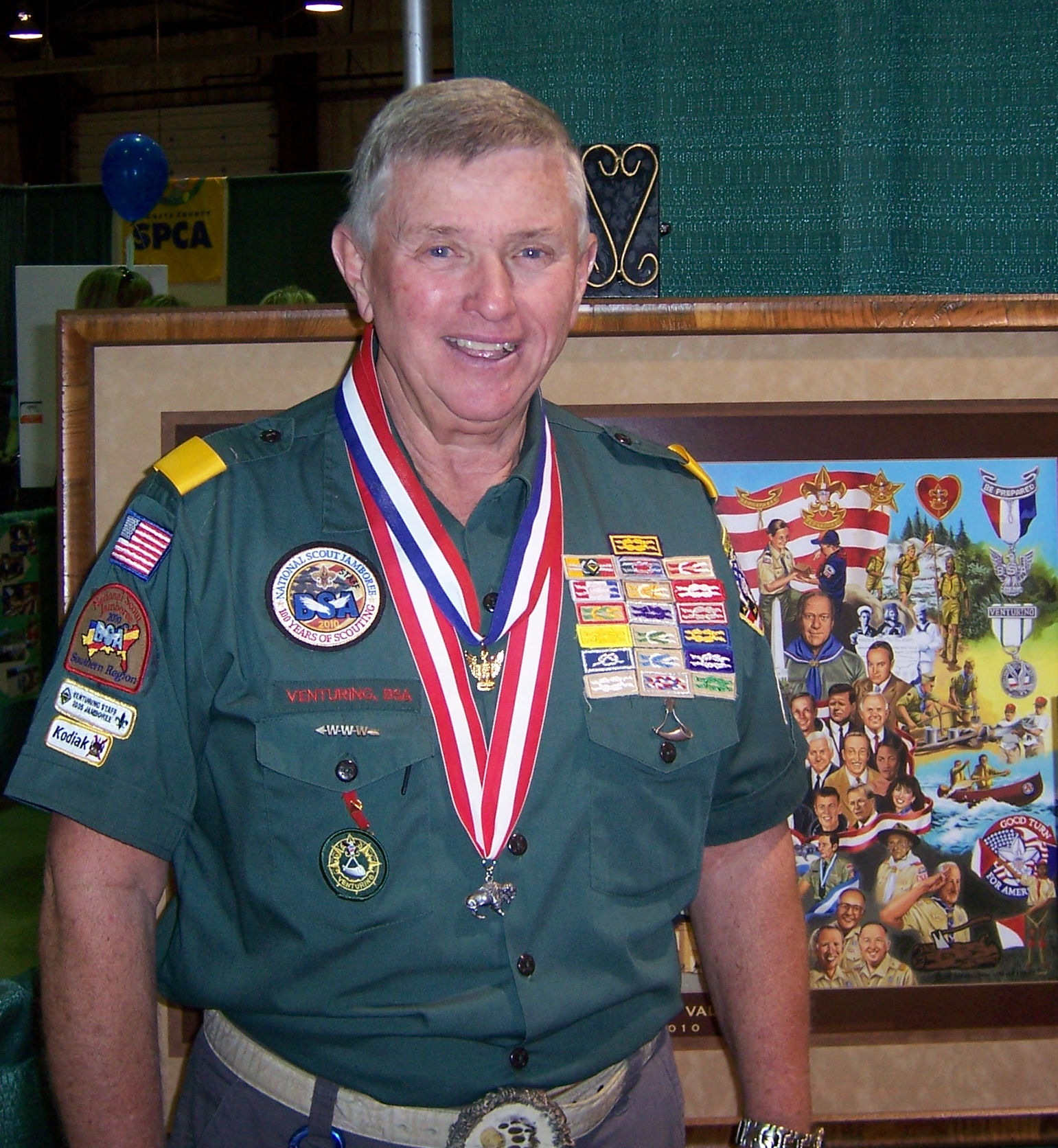
Richards Miller with his DESA and Silver Buffalo awards

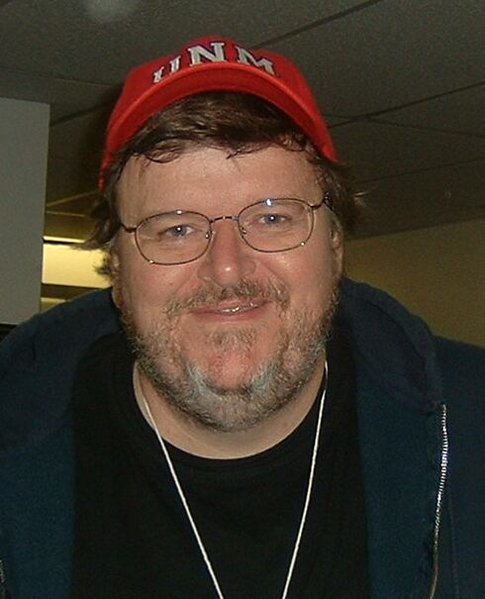
Michael Moore

=== N ===
| Name | Eagle Scout | Awards | Notability | References |
|---|---|---|---|---|
| Ben Nelson | 1956 | Distinguished Eagle Scout Award | 37th Governor of Nebraska; Senator from Nebraska (2001–2013) | ^{[a]} |
| Ozzie Nelson † | 1920 | Distinguished Eagle Scout Award | Actor and band leader | ^{[a]} |
| Paul Martin Newby | 1971 c. | | Justice on the North Carolina Supreme Court (2004–) | |
| Henry Nicols † | 1989 c. | | International AIDS activist | |
| Jay Nixon | 1969 | Distinguished Eagle Scout Award | 55th Governor of Missouri | |
| Thomas R. Norris | 1959 | Distinguished Eagle Scout Award | Retired Navy SEAL who received the Medal of Honor for actions in Viet Nam; retired FBI agent and member of the Hostage Rescue Team | |
| Sam Nunn | 1951 | Distinguished Eagle Scout Award | Businessman and politician; Senator from Georgia (1972–1997); co-chairman and CEO of the Nuclear Threat Initiative | ^{[a]}^{[d]} |
| Harley D. Nygren † | 1940 c. | | Naval Reserve officer during World War II; Coast and Geodetic Survey Corps, ESSA Corps officer; first Director of the National Oceanic and Atmospheric Administration | |

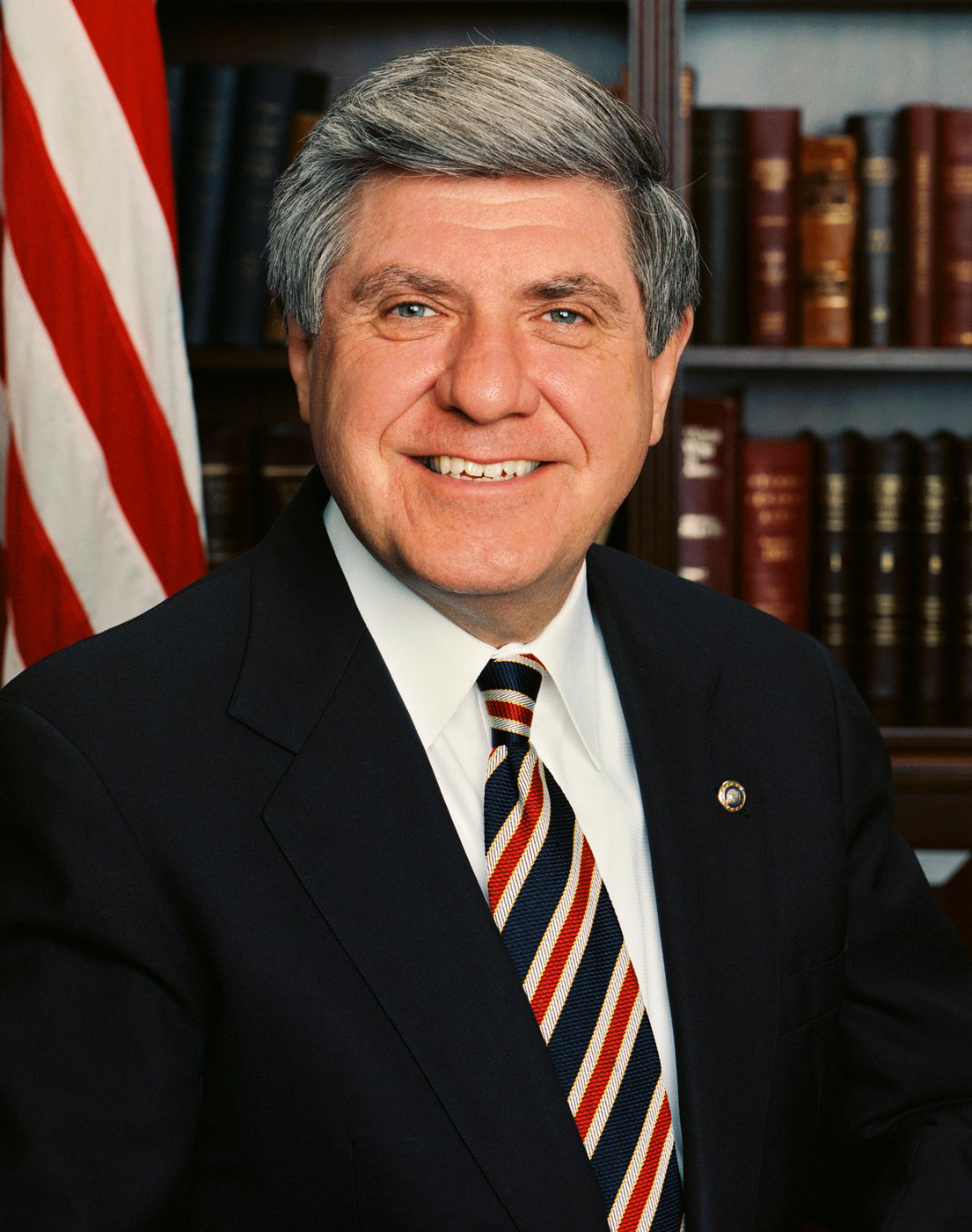
Ben Nelson

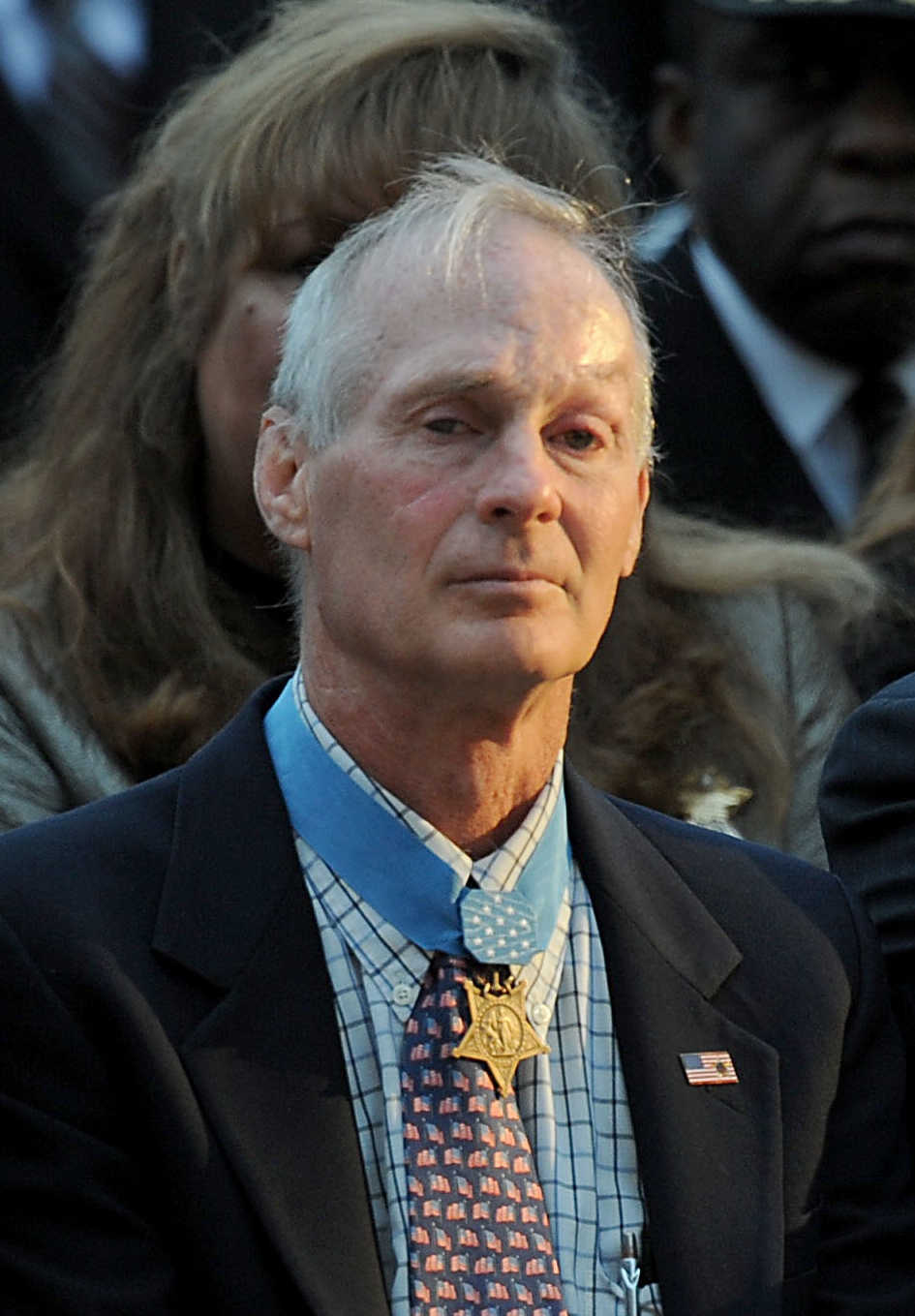
Thomas Norris

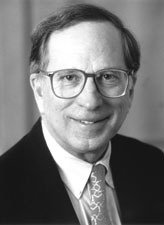
Sam Nunn

=== O ===
| Name | Eagle Scout | Awards | Notability | References |
|---|---|---|---|---|
| Thomas J. O'Brien | 1981 c. | | Treasurer of Plymouth County, Massachusetts State Representative, CEO and President of Bay Colony Baseball & Athletics | |
| James O'Keefe | 2002 | | Political activist, founder of Project Veritas | |
| Brian O'Leary † | 1956 | | Astronaut who was the deputy team leader for Mariner 10 | ^{[f]} |
| Dallin H. Oaks | 1947 | Distinguished Eagle Scout Award | 18th President of the Church of Jesus Christ of Latter-day Saints; Utah Supreme Court Justice; 8th president of Brigham Young University | ^{[a]} |
| Daniel J. Oates | 1969 | | Chief of police in Aurora, Colorado, chief of police in Ann Arbor, Michigan and member of the New York Police Department | |
| Daniel Oerther | 1987 | | American social entrepreneur; professor of Environmental Engineering at the Missouri University of Science and Technology and the University of Cincinnati. | |
| Bobby Okereke | 2013 | | NFL linebacker | |
| Arlo L. Olson † | 1934 c. | | Army captain during World War II who was awarded the Medal of Honor posthumously for service in Italy | |
| Ellison Onizuka † | 1962 c. | | Air Force lieutenant colonel and astronaut who flew on shuttle mission STS-51-C; died onboard Space Shuttle Challenger | ^{[e]}^{[f]} |
| Stephen S. Oswald | 1967 | Distinguished Eagle Scout Award | Navy rear admiral; astronaut who flew on shuttle missions STS-42, STS-56, and STS-67 | ^{[a]}^{[f]} |
| Dan Ownby | 1984 | NESA Outstanding Eagle Scout Award | Houston energy executive; World Scout Committee Member | |

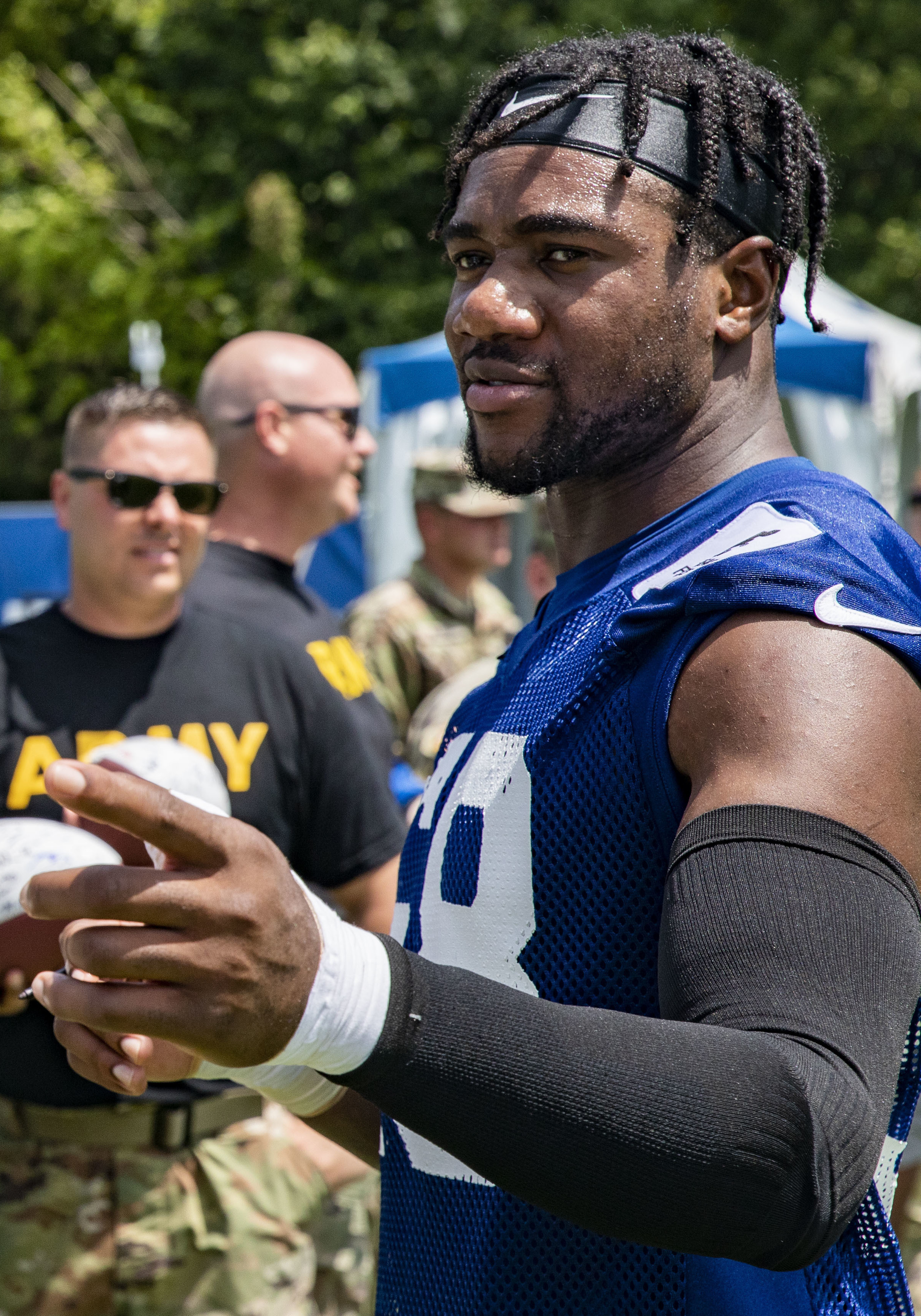
Bobby Okereke

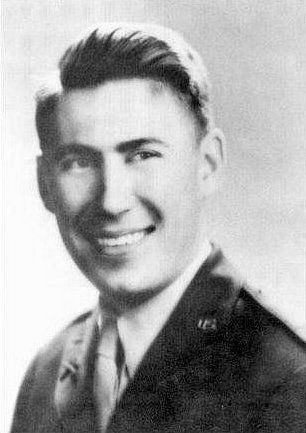
Arlo L. Olson

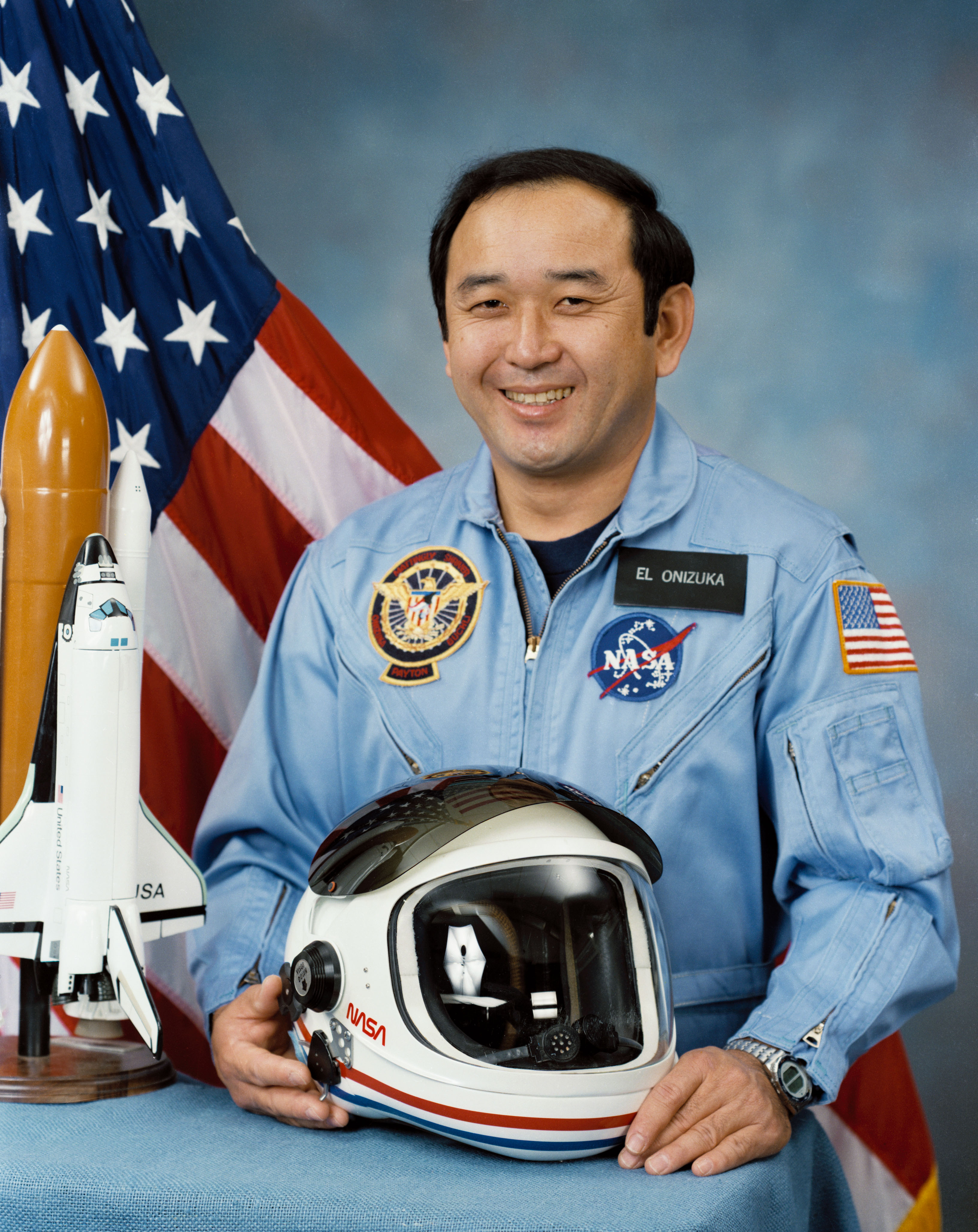
Ellison Onizuka

=== P ===
| Name | Eagle Scout | Awards | Notability | References |
|---|---|---|---|---|
| Mitchell Paige † | 1936 | Distinguished Eagle Scout Award | Marine Corps colonel who was awarded the Medal of Honor while a machinegun platoon sergeant for actions during the Guadalcanal campaign | ^{[a]}^{[e]} |
| Mike Pantelides | 2000 c. | NESA Outstanding Eagle Scout Award | Mayor of Annapolis, Maryland (2013-2017) | |
| Matt Paradis | 2008 | | Center for the Denver Broncos; Super Bowl 50 champion | |
| Francis J. Parater † | 1913 c. | | Catholic seminarian from Virginia nominated for sainthood | |
| Scott E. Parazynski | 1977 | NESA Outstanding Eagle Scout Award | Medical doctor; astronaut who flew missions STS-66, STS-86, STS-95 and STS-100 | ^{[f]} |
| Ben Parr | 2002 | | Author, investor, journalist and tech expert; author of Captivology, Co-Editor of Mashable and columnist for CNET. | |
| Neil Parrott | 1987 | | Maryland State Delegate (2011-2023) | |
| Henry Paulson | 1960 | Distinguished Eagle Scout Award | CEO of Goldman Sachs (1998–2006); president of The Nature Conservancy, Secretary of the Treasury (2006–2009) | ^{[a]}^{[e]} |
| Edward A. Pease | 1966 | Distinguished Eagle Scout Award | Representative from Indiana (1997–2001); Chairman of the National Order of the Arrow Committee | ^{[a]} |
| J. H. Binford Peay III | 1954 | Distinguished Eagle Scout Award | Army general; 14th superintendent of Virginia Military Institute | ^{[a]}^{[e]} |
| Ross Perot, Sr. † | 1943 | Distinguished Eagle Scout Award | Businessman, CEO of EDS and Perot Systems; ran for President of the United States in 1992 and 1996 | ^{[a]}^{[e]}^{[d]} |
| Ross Perot, Jr. | 1974 c. | Distinguished Eagle Scout Award | Real estate developer and Businessman | ^{[a]} |
| Rick Perry | 1964 | Distinguished Eagle Scout Award | 47th Governor of Texas; presidential candidate (2012, 2016); U.S. Secretary of Energy (2017-2019) | ^{[a]} |
| Gary Peters | 1976 c. | Distinguished Eagle Scout Award | Senator from Michigan (2015-present) | |
| Donald Pettit | 1971 c. | | Astronaut who participated in missions STS-113, Expedition 6 and Soyuz TMA-1 | ^{[f]} |
| August Pfluger | 1994 c. | | Representative from Texas (2021–) | |
| Fred Phelps † | 1936 c. | | Leader of Westboro Baptist Church | |
| J. J. Pickle † | 1931 | Distinguished Eagle Scout Award | Representative from Texas (1963–1995) | ^{[a]} |
| Samuel Pierce † | 1936 | Distinguished Eagle Scout Award | Lawyer; Secretary of Housing and Urban Development (1981–1989) | ^{[a]} |
| Loulan Pitre Jr. | 1976 | | Louisiana Lawyer and member of the Louisiana House of Representatives | |
| Dennis Pitta | 2000 | NESA Outstanding Eagle Scout Award | National Football League tight end for the Baltimore Ravens; Super Bowl XLVII Champion | |
| Michael Pocalyko | 1968 | Distinguished Eagle Scout Award | CEO of Monticello Capital, corporate director, financial novelist, Beirut veteran | ^{[a]} |
| Bryce Poe II † | 1940 | Distinguished Eagle Scout Award | United States Air Force general; Commander, Air Force Logistics Command (1978–1981) | ^{[a]} |
| Jon Powers | 1994 c. | | Co-star of Gunner Palace; founder of War Kids Relief; Iraq War veteran; Congressional candidate | |
| Ralph Puckett † | 1943 | | Army Ranger who was awarded the Medal of Honor for his actions during the Korean War; national programs coordinator of Outward Bound; established Discovery; created the Discovery Program at The Westminster Schools; the executive vice president of MicroBilt | |

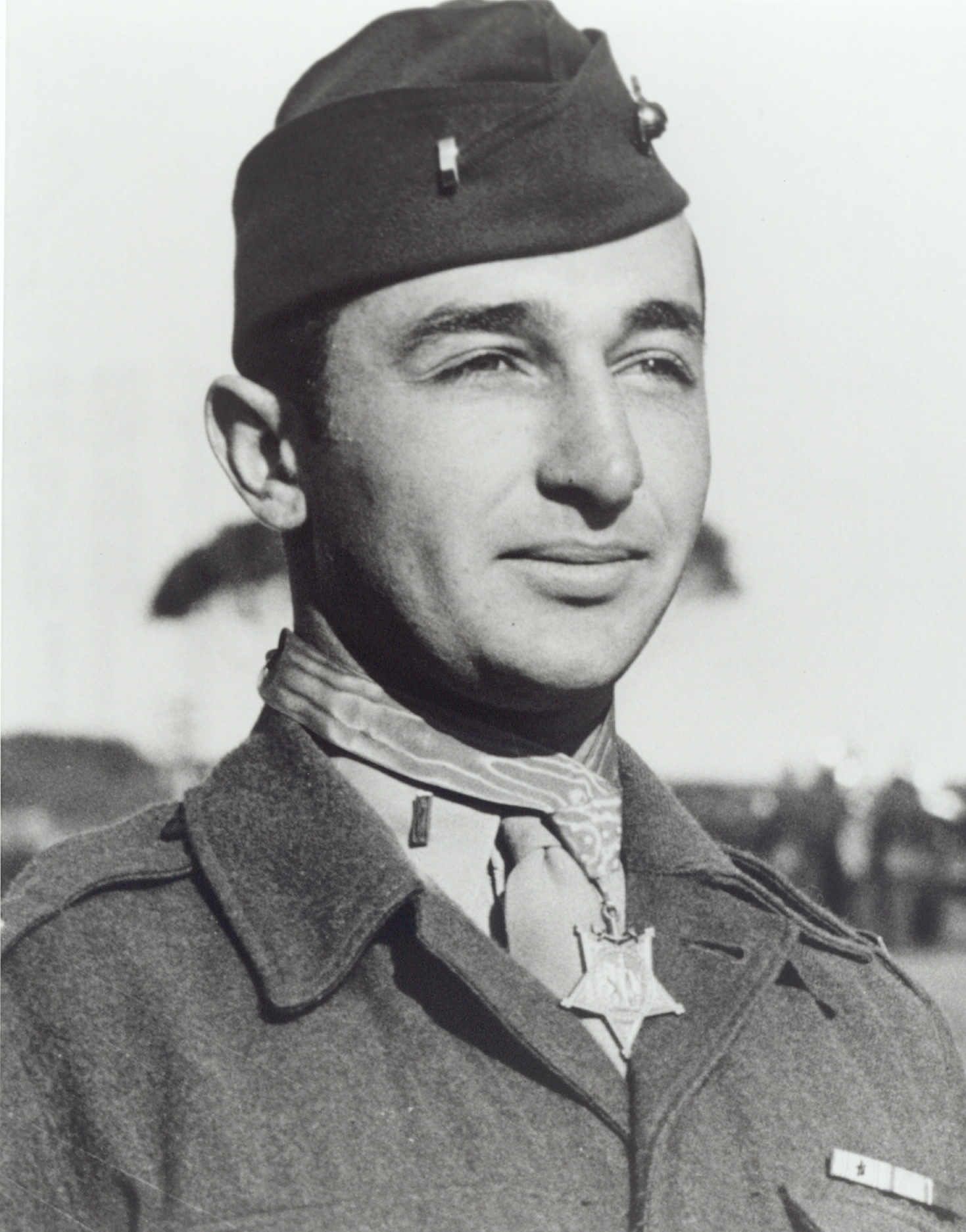
Mitchell Paige

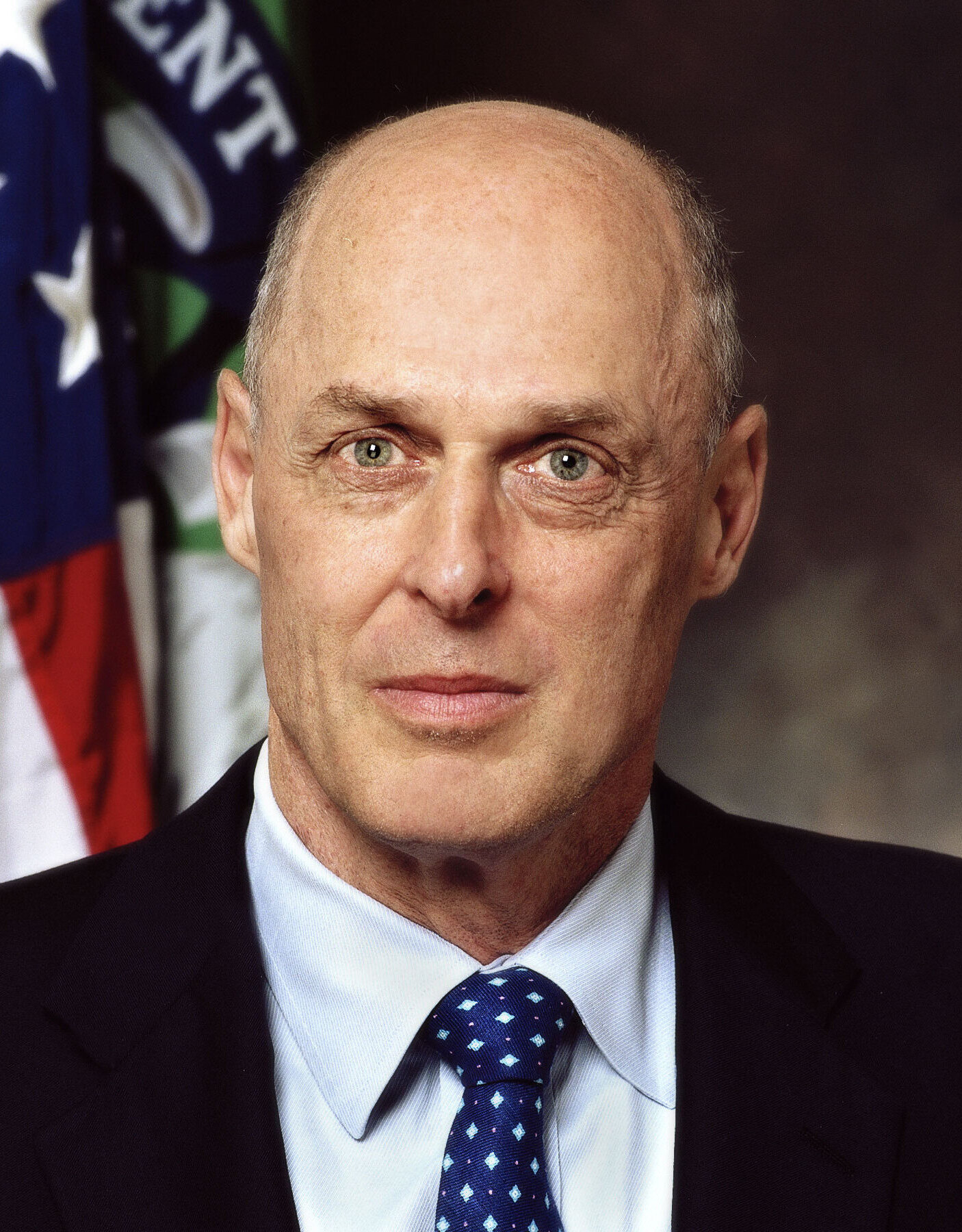
Henry Paulson

Ross Perot

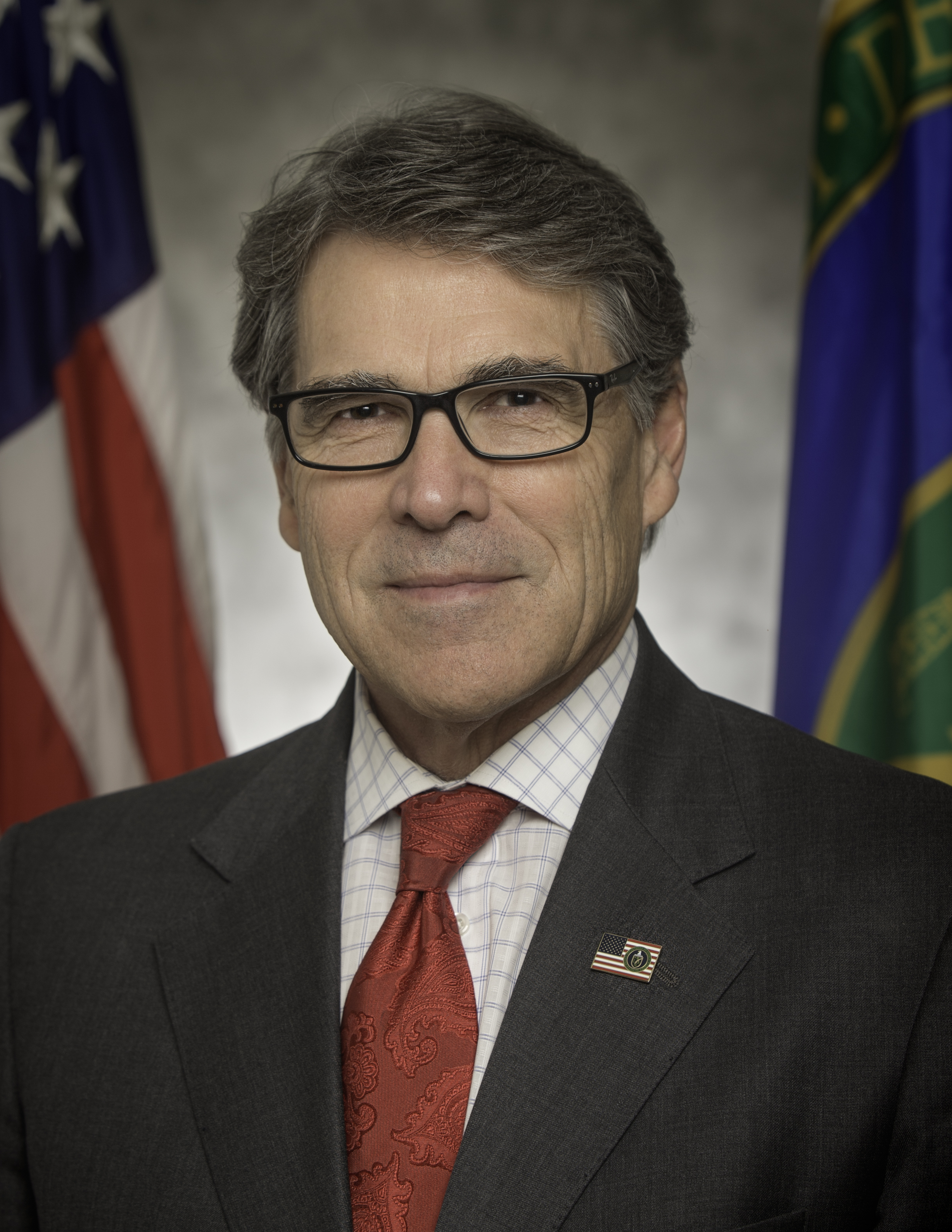
Rick Perry

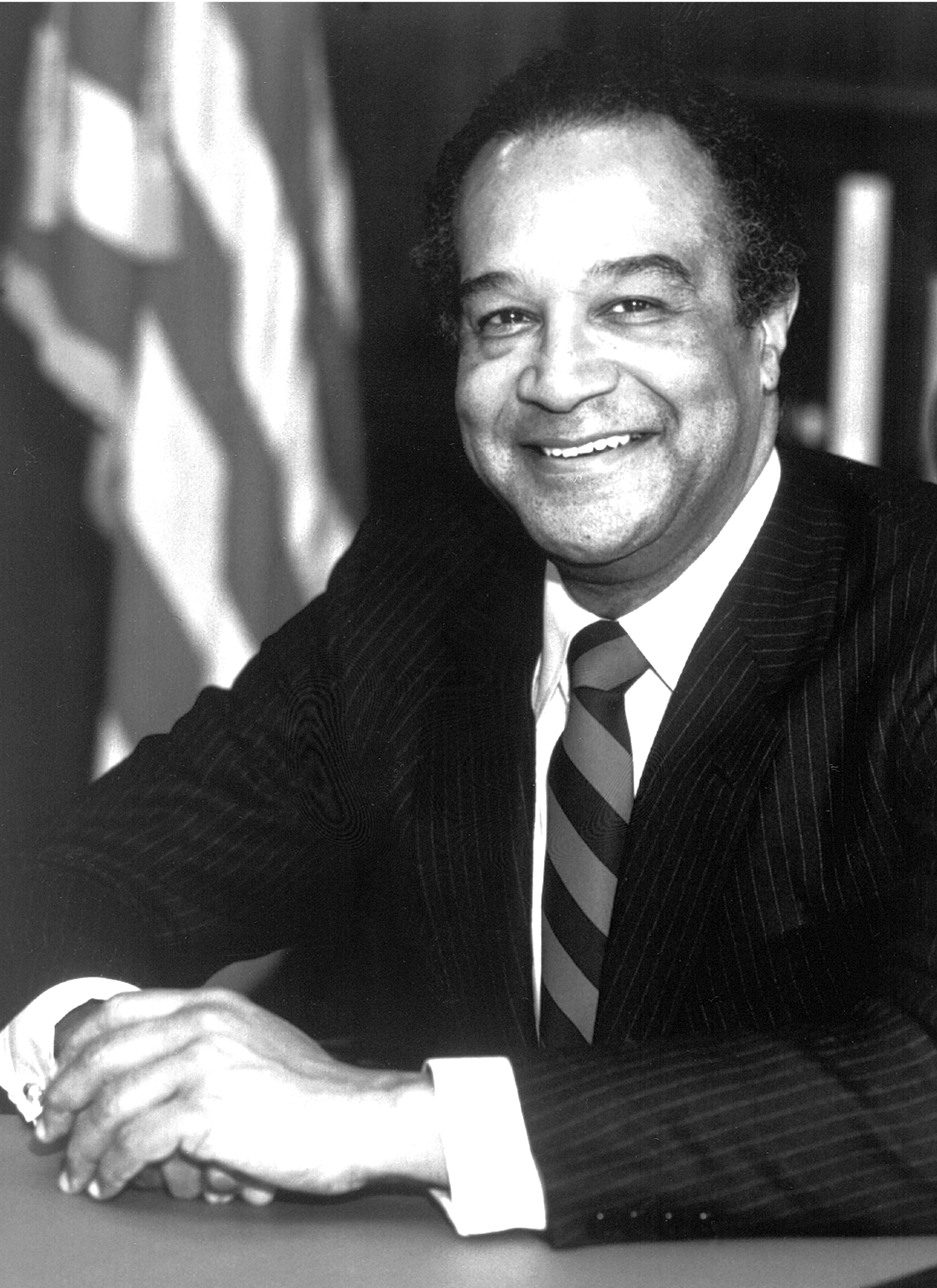
Samuel Pierce

=== R ===
| Name | Eagle Scout | Awards | Notability | References |
|---|---|---|---|---|
| Jere Ratcliffe † | 1955 | Distinguished Eagle Scout Award | Chief Scout Executive of the Boy Scouts of America (1993–2000) | |
| Beasley Reece | 1967 | Distinguished Eagle Scout Award | Sports announcer and NFL defensive back | ^{[a]} |
| Ralph Reed | 1979 | | Political activist; founding executive director of the Christian Coalition | |
| Kenneth S. Reightler Jr. | 1967 c. | | Astronaut who flew on shuttle missions STS-48 and STS-60 | ^{[f]} |
| Frederick Reines † | 1934 c. | | Physicist who was awarded the Nobel Prize in Physics in 1995 | |
| Sean Reyes | 1986 | Distinguished Eagle Scout Award | Utah Attorney General | |
| Daniel Reynolds | 2004 | | Lead singer of international recording artists Imagine Dragons | |
| Slater Rhea | 2000 | | Singer and TV personality in China | |
| L. Scott Rice | 1972 | | Air Force major general; commander of Massachusetts Air National Guard | |
| Michael A. Rice | 1972 | | Biologist; Rhode Island House of Representatives (2009–2011) | |
| John Edward Robinson | 1957 | | Serial killer | |
| George Rodrigue † | 1960 | Distinguished Eagle Scout Award | Artist | |
| Evan Roe | 2015 | | Actor; star of CBS drama Madam Secretary | |
| Phil Roe | 1963 | Distinguished Eagle Scout Award | Representative from Tennessee (2009–2021) | ^{[a]} |
| James D. Rogers | 1965 | Distinguished Eagle Scout Award | CEO of Kampgrounds of America, brother of T. Gary | ^{[a]} |
| T. Gary Rogers † | 1956 | Distinguished Eagle Scout Award | CEO of Dreyer's Grand Ice Cream, brother of James | ^{[a]} |
| Dana Rohrabacher | 1963 | Distinguished Eagle Scout Award | Special assistant to President Ronald Reagan (1976–1988); Representative from California (1989–2019) | ^{[a]} |
| Kevin Rose | 1993 c. | | Founder of Digg and co-host of Diggnation | |
| Brian M. Rosenthal | 2006 | | Pulitzer Prize winning reporter for Investigative Reporting | |
| Edward L. Rowan | 1955 | Distinguished Eagle Scout Award | Psychiatrist, sex therapist, author, Scouting leader | ^{[a]} |
| Mike Rowe | 1979 | Distinguished Eagle Scout Award | Host of Dirty Jobs; narrator | |
| Milton Rubenfeld † | 1935 c. | | Fighter pilot for Britain and America in World War II, one of the founders of the Israeli Air Force | |
| Warren Rudman † | 1945 | Distinguished Eagle Scout Award | Attorney General of New Hampshire (1970–1976); Senator from New Hampshire (1980–1993) | ^{[a]} |
| Donald Rumsfeld † | 1949 | Distinguished Eagle Scout Award | Representative from Illinois (1963–1969); White House Chief of Staff (1974–1975); Secretary of Defense (1975–1977, 2001–2006); Ambassador to NATO (1973–1974) | ^{[a]}^{[d]} |

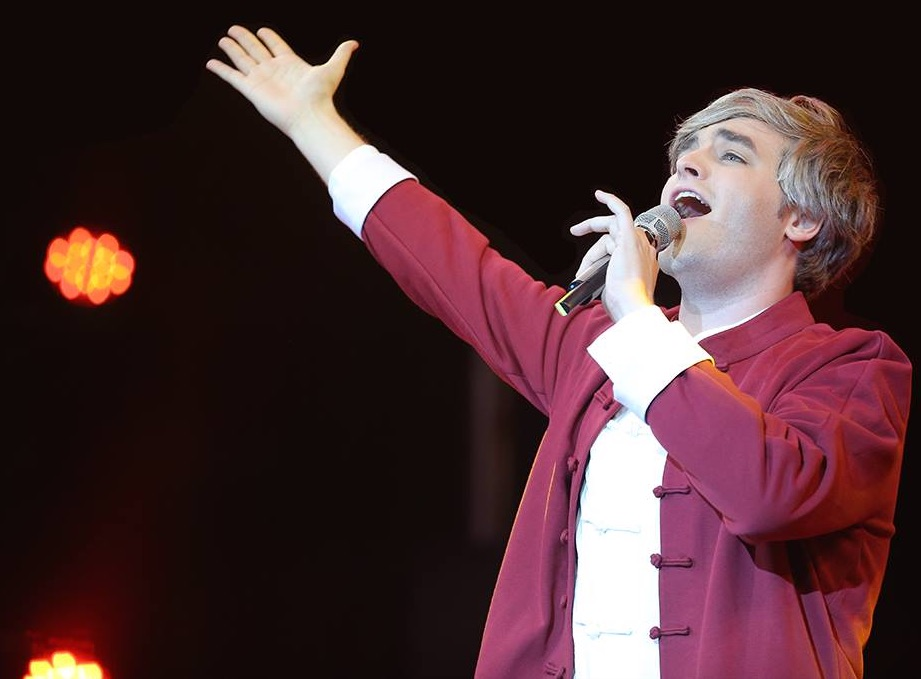
Slater Rhea

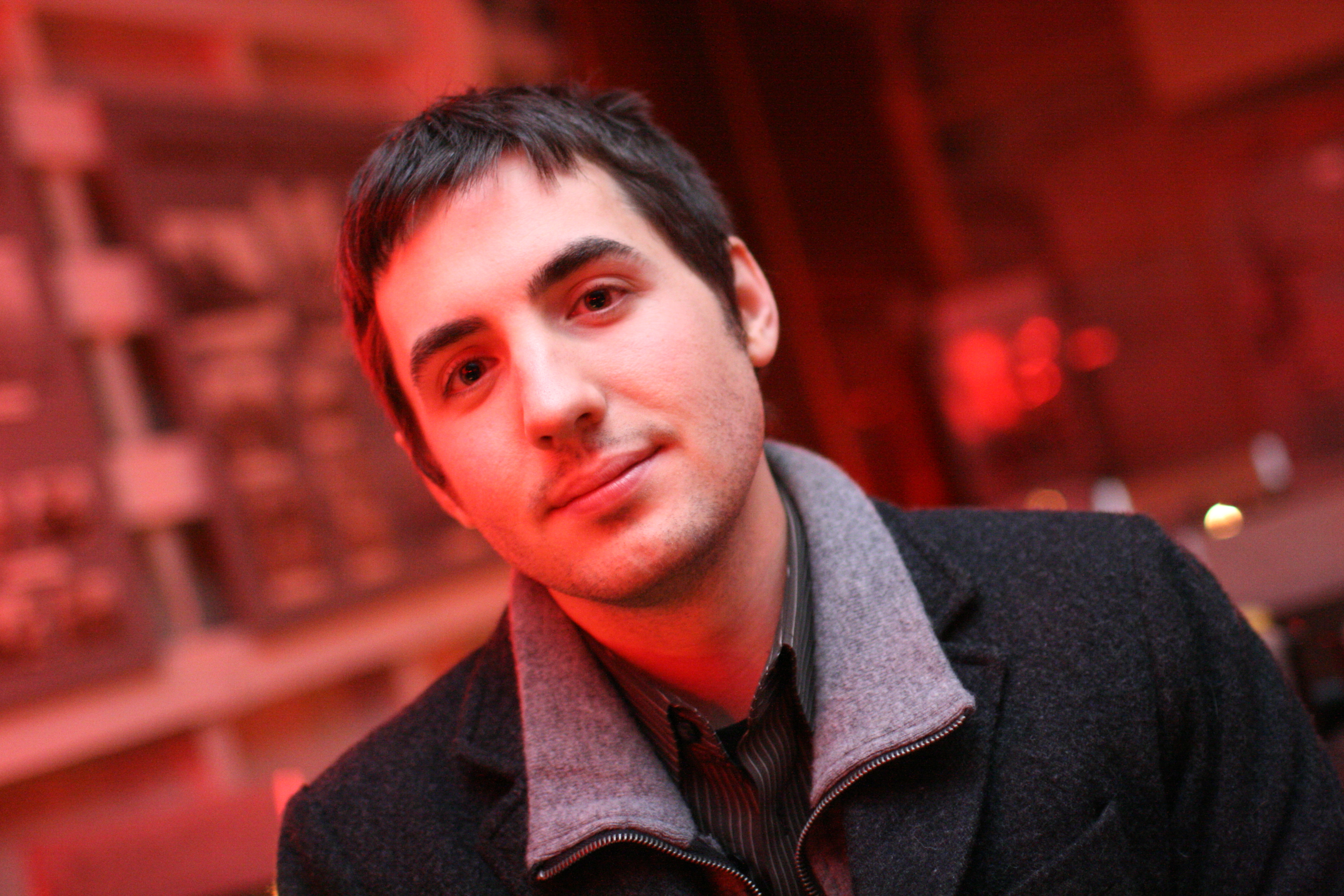
Kevin Rose

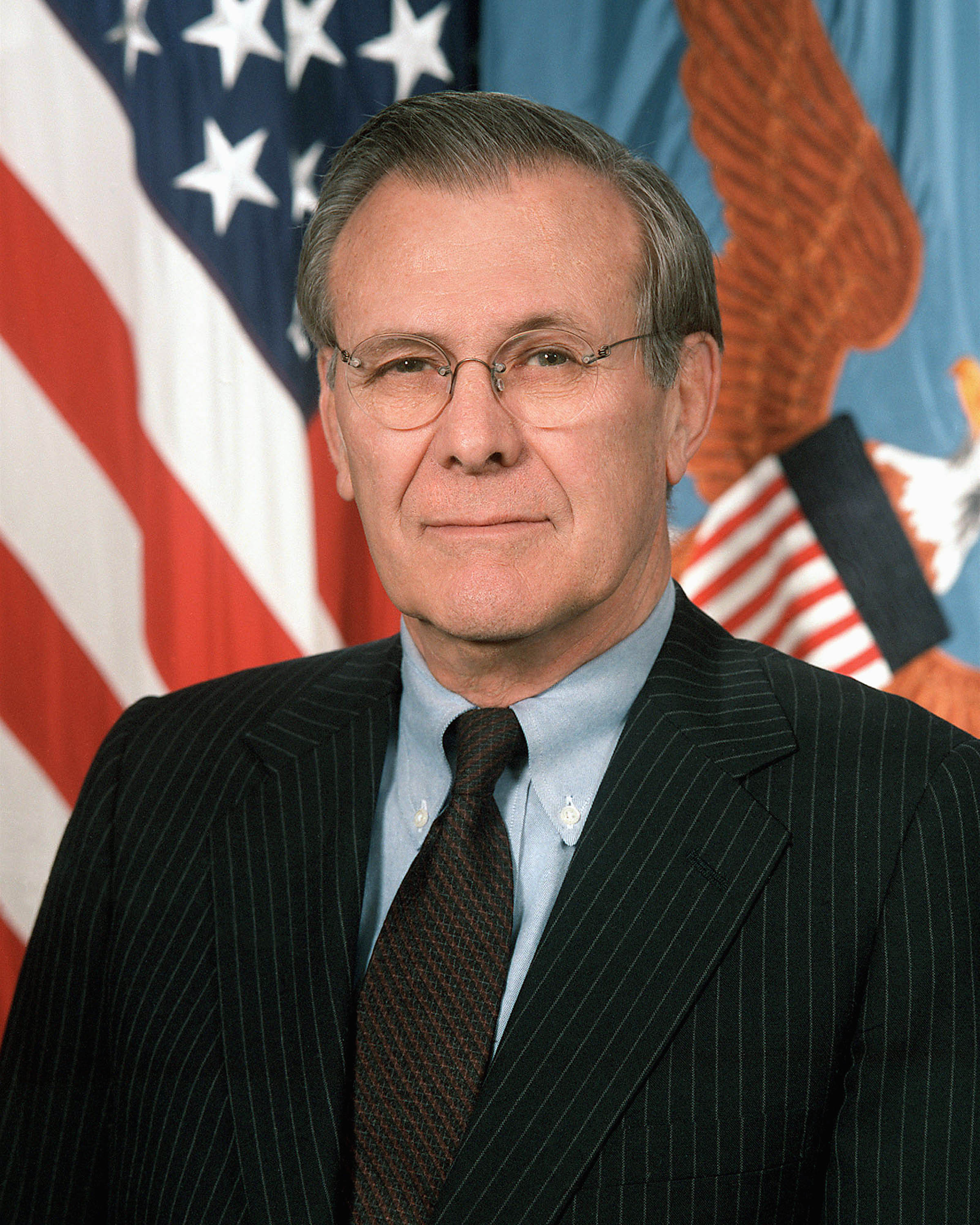
Donald Rumsfeld

=== S ===
| Name | Eagle Scout | Awards | Notability | References |
|---|---|---|---|---|
| Stephan Said | 1985 c. | | Singer-songwriter, musician, poet and political activist | |
| Harrison Salisbury † | 1924 | Distinguished Eagle Scout Award | Journalist who was awarded the Pulitzer Prize (1955); twice received the George Polk Award for Foreign Reporting (1957 and 1966) | ^{[a]}^{[d]} |
| Benjamin L. Salomon † | 1930 c. | | Army dentist during World War II who was awarded the Medal of Honor posthumously for defense of his medical aid station during the Battle of Saipan | |
| James Sanderson † | 1943 | Distinguished Eagle Scout Award | Navy vice admiral; commanding officer of USS Rainier (AE-5) and USS Saratoga (CV-60) | ^{[a]} |
| Dale V. Sandstrom | 1965 | Distinguished Eagle Scout Award | Justice on the North Dakota Supreme Court (1992–) | ^{[a]} |
| Mark Sanford | 1965 | | Representative from South Carolina (1995–2001, 2013–2019); 115th Governor of South Carolina | ^{[e]} |
| Terry Sanford † | 1932 | Distinguished Eagle Scout Award | 65th Governor of North Carolina; president of Duke University (1969–1985); Senator from North Carolina (1986–1993) | ^{[a]}^{[e]} |
| Steve Schmidt | 1986 c. | | Communications and public affairs political strategist | |
| William Knox Schroeder † | 1966 c. | | Victim of the Kent State shootings | |
| David Schultheis | 1956 c. | | Member of the Colorado Senate (2007–2011) and Colorado House of Representatives (2000–2007) | |
| Rick Scott | 1970 c. | | 45th Governor of Florida; Senator from Florida (2019-present) | |
| Robert Lee Scott Jr. † | 1923 | Distinguished Eagle Scout Award | Air Force brigadier general, World War II fighter ace, commander of Flying Tigers, and author of God is My Co-Pilot | ^{[a]}^{[e]} |
| Walter Scott Jr. † | 1946 | Distinguished Eagle Scout Award | Civil engineer, philanthropist, and CEO of Peter Kiewit Sons' Incorporated | ^{[a]} |
| Richard A. Searfoss † | 1972 c. | | Air Force colonel and astronaut who flew on shuttle missions STS-58, STS-76, and STS-90 | ^{[f]} |
| Elliot See † | 1943 c. | | Astronaut who was the backup pilot for Gemini 5 before his death | ^{[f]} |
| Chris Segal | 2000 | | Major League Baseball umpire | |
| Cleveland Sellers | 2007 | | Civil rights activist | |
| Jeff Sessions | 1963 | Distinguished Eagle Scout Award | Attorney General of Alabama (1995–1997); Senator from Alabama (1997–2016); U.S. Attorney General (2017–2018) | ^{[a]} |
| Pete Sessions | 1970 | Distinguished Eagle Scout Award | Representative from Texas (1997–2019) | ^{[a]}^{[e]} |
| William S. Sessions † | 1947 | Distinguished Eagle Scout Award | District judge and Director of the Federal Bureau of Investigation (1987–1993) | ^{[a]}^{[e]} |
| Raymond P. Shafer † | 1931 | Distinguished Eagle Scout Award | Lawyer; 39th Governor of Pennsylvania | ^{[a]} |
| Mark M. Shelton | 1974 c. | | Fort Worth pediatrician, specialist in pediatric infectious diseases, and member of the Texas House of Representatives | |
| Randall T. Shepard | 1962 | Distinguished Eagle Scout Award | Chief Justice of the Indiana Supreme Court | ^{[a]} |
| John Silber † | 1944 | Distinguished Eagle Scout Award | President of Boston University (1971–1996); Chancellor of Boston University (1996–2003); President Emeritus of Boston University (2003–2012); candidate for governor of Massachusetts (1990) | ^{[a]} |
| Stephen Silberkraus | 1999 | | Nevada State Assemblyman; multimedia professional, author | |
| Paul Siple † | 1923 | | Antarctic explorer and geographer who took part in six Antarctic expeditions, having first gone representing the Boy Scouts of America as an Eagle Scout; later helped develop the principle of wind chill | |
| Ike Skelton † | 1948 | Distinguished Eagle Scout Award | Representative from Missouri (1977–2011) | ^{[a]} |
| Samuel K. Skinner | 1953 | Distinguished Eagle Scout Award | Politician and businessman; Secretary of Transportation (1989–1991); White House Chief of Staff (1991–1992); CEO of Commonwealth Edison; CEO of US Freightways; on the board of directors of Odetics ITS; on the board of directors of Dade Behring | ^{[a]} |
| Britt K. Slabinski | 1984 | | Navy master chief and SEAL; awarded Medal of Honor for combat in Afghanistan | |
| Chuck Smith † | 1959 | Distinguished Eagle Scout Award | President and CEO of AT&T West | ^{[a]} |
| Chris Smith | 1967 | NESA Outstanding Eagle Scout Award | Representative from New Jersey (1981–present) | ^{[a]}^{[a]} |
| David Miln Smith | 1954 c. | | Motivational speaker and adventure athlete | |
| Gordon H. Smith | 1968 | Distinguished Eagle Scout Award | Lawyer and businessman; Senator from Oregon (1997–2009) | ^{[a]} |
| Guy M. Snodgrass | 1993 | NESA Outstanding Eagle Scout Award | TOPGUN Instructor, Pentagon Communications Director and Chief Speechwriter, author | ^{[a]} |
| Wilson W. Sorensen † | 1932 | Distinguished Eagle Scout Award | President of Utah Technical College, now Utah Valley University (1946–1982) | ^{[a]} |
| W. Scott Sorrels | 1971 | Distinguished Eagle Scout Award | 12th National Commissioner of the BSA | |
| Lewis Sorley † | 1950 | Distinguished Eagle Scout Award | Army lieutenant colonel; writer; military historian | |
| F. Richard Spencer | 1968 c. | NESA Outstanding Eagle Scout Award | Roman Catholic Bishop; Army chaplain | |
| Steven Spielberg | 1961 | Distinguished Eagle Scout Award | Academy Award-winning film director, film producer, and screenwriter | ^{[a]} |
| Richard H. Stallings † | 1957 | | Representative from Idaho (1985-1993), Chairman of the Idaho Democratic Party (2005-2007) | |
| Wallace Stegner † | 1925 c. | | Historian, novelist, short story writer, and environmentalist; "The Dean of Western Writers"; won the Pulitzer Prize for Fiction in 1972 for Angle of Repose | |
| Steve Stivers | 1983 | | Representative for Ohio's 15th congressional district | |
| Ryan Stout | 1997 | | Comedian | |
| Luther Strange | 1965 | Distinguished Eagle Scout Award | Lawyer; Attorney General of Alabama (2011–2017), Senator from Alabama (2017–2018); | |
| Bart Stupak | 1968 c. | | Lawyer; Representative from Michigan (1993–2011) | ^{[a]} |
| Ray Suarez | 1975 | Distinguished Eagle Scout Award | News correspondent and author | ^{[a]} |
| Percy Sutton † | 1936 | Distinguished Eagle Scout Award | Civil rights activist; pilot with Tuskegee Airmen; lawyer; entrepreneur who co-founded the Inner City Broadcasting Corporation and revitalized the Apollo Theater | ^{[a]} |
| John Swainson † | 1939 c. | | 42nd Governor of Michigan and Michigan Supreme Court Justice | |
| Nick Symmonds | 2000 c. | | Track and field athlete | |

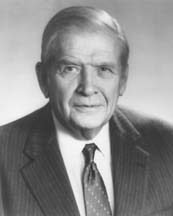
Terry Sanford

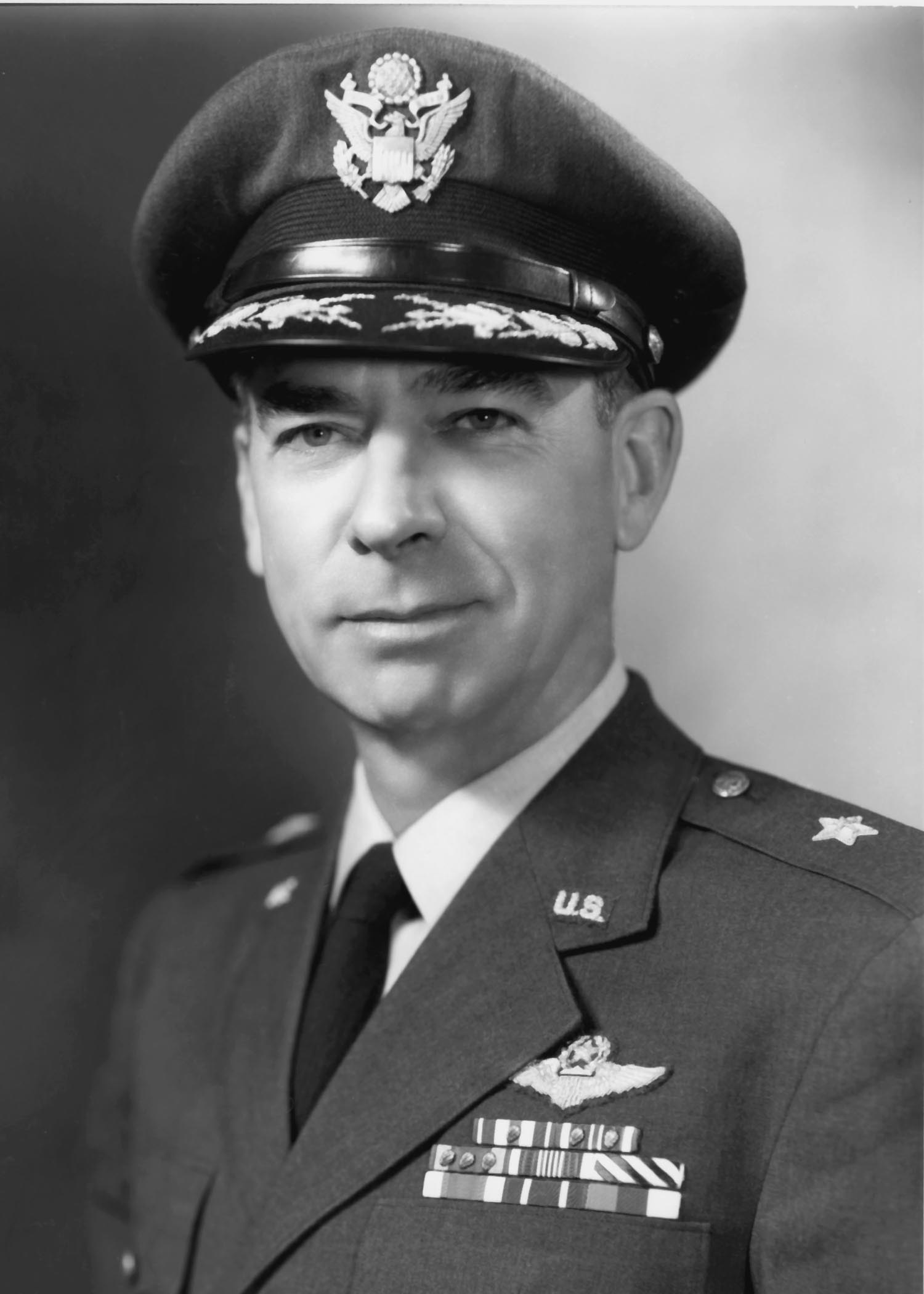
Robert Lee Scott Jr.

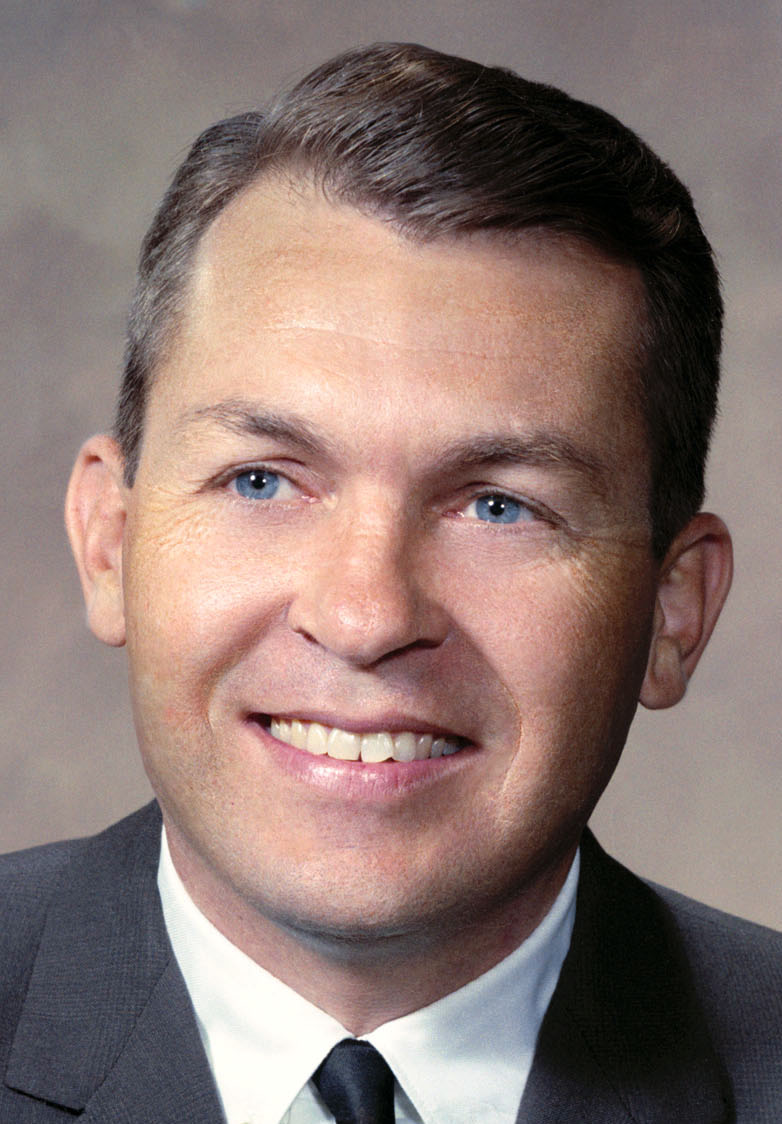
Elliott See

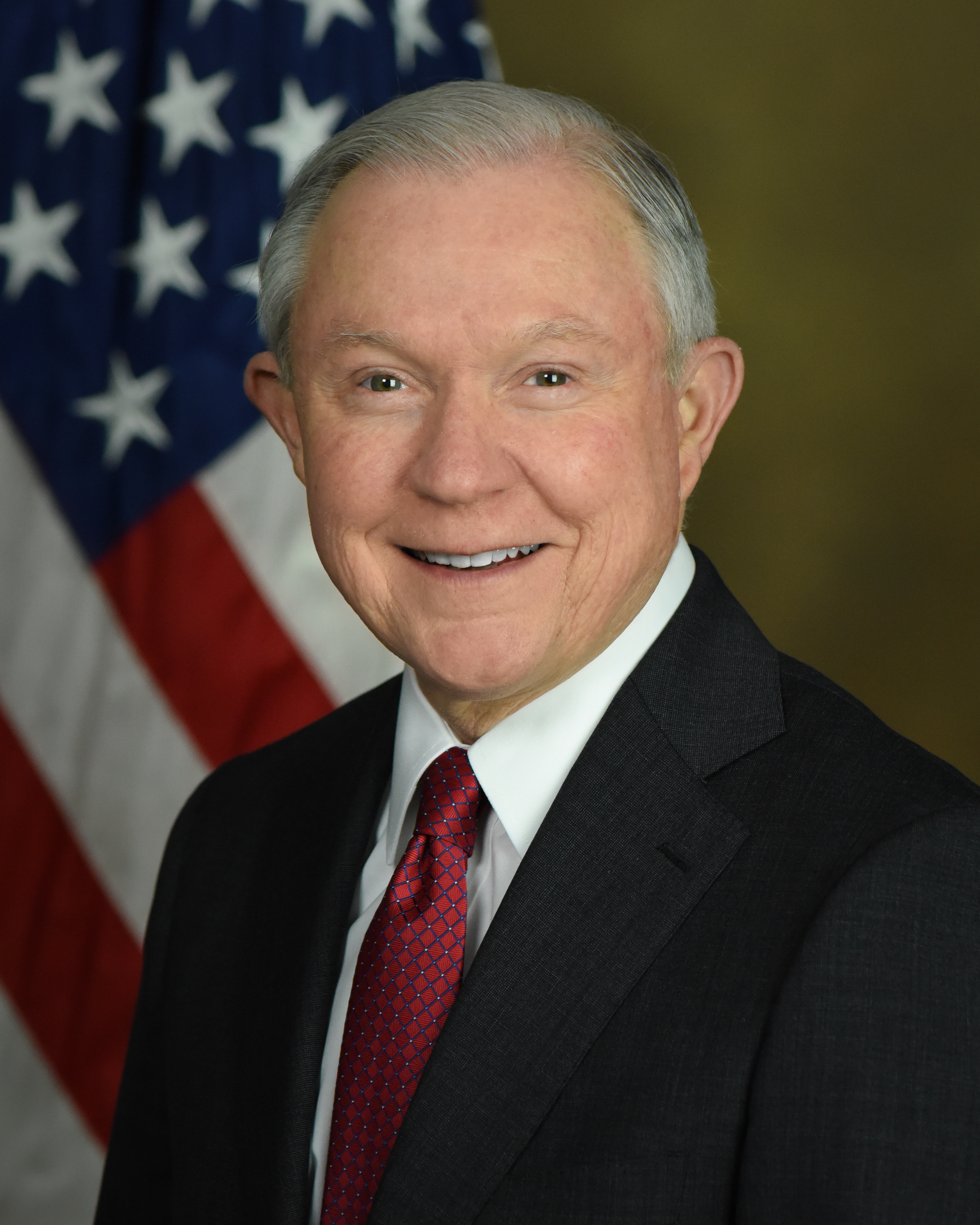
Jeff Sessions

Pete Sessions

Samuel Skinner

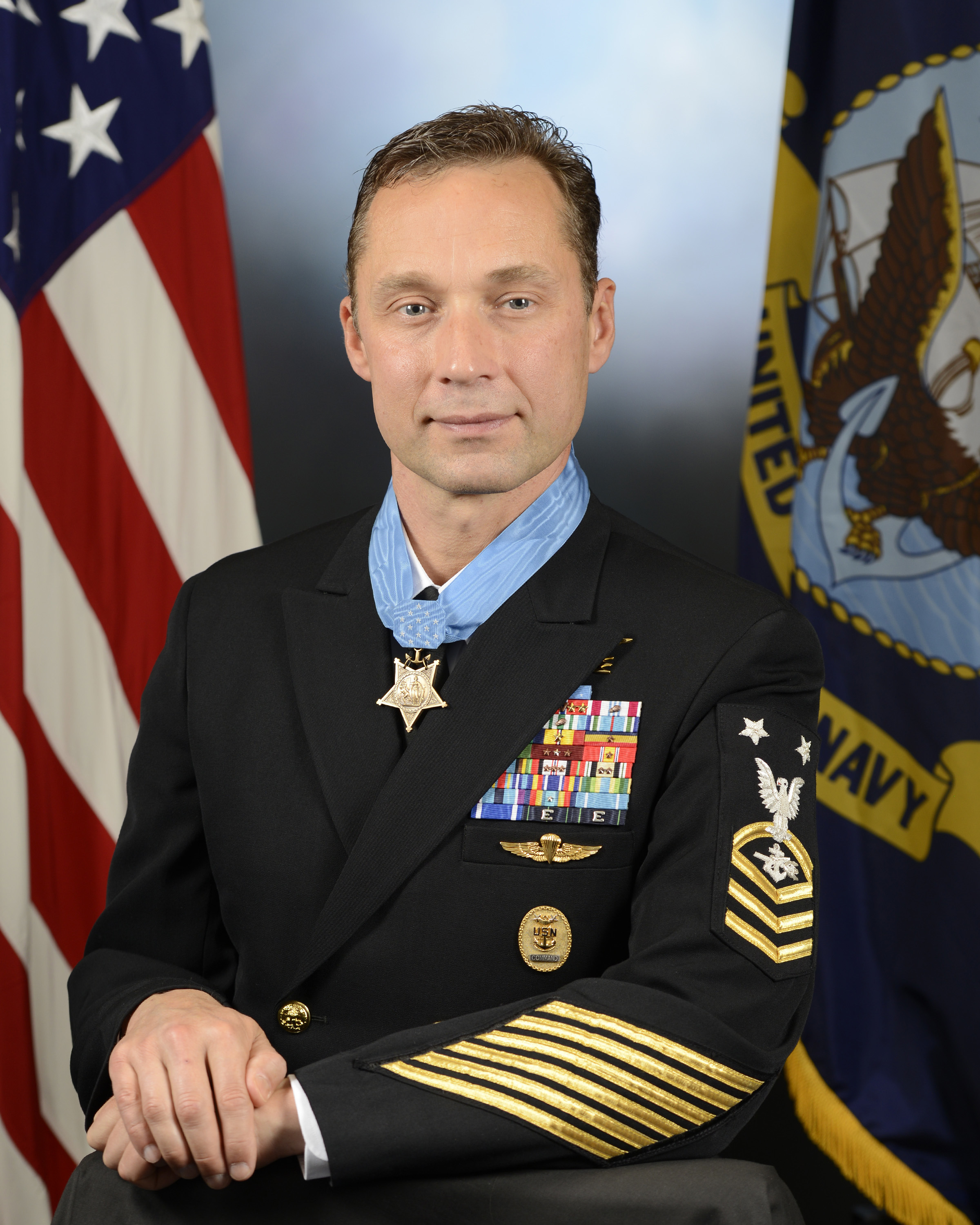
Britt Slabinski

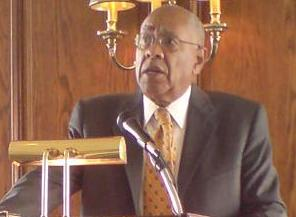
Chuck Smith

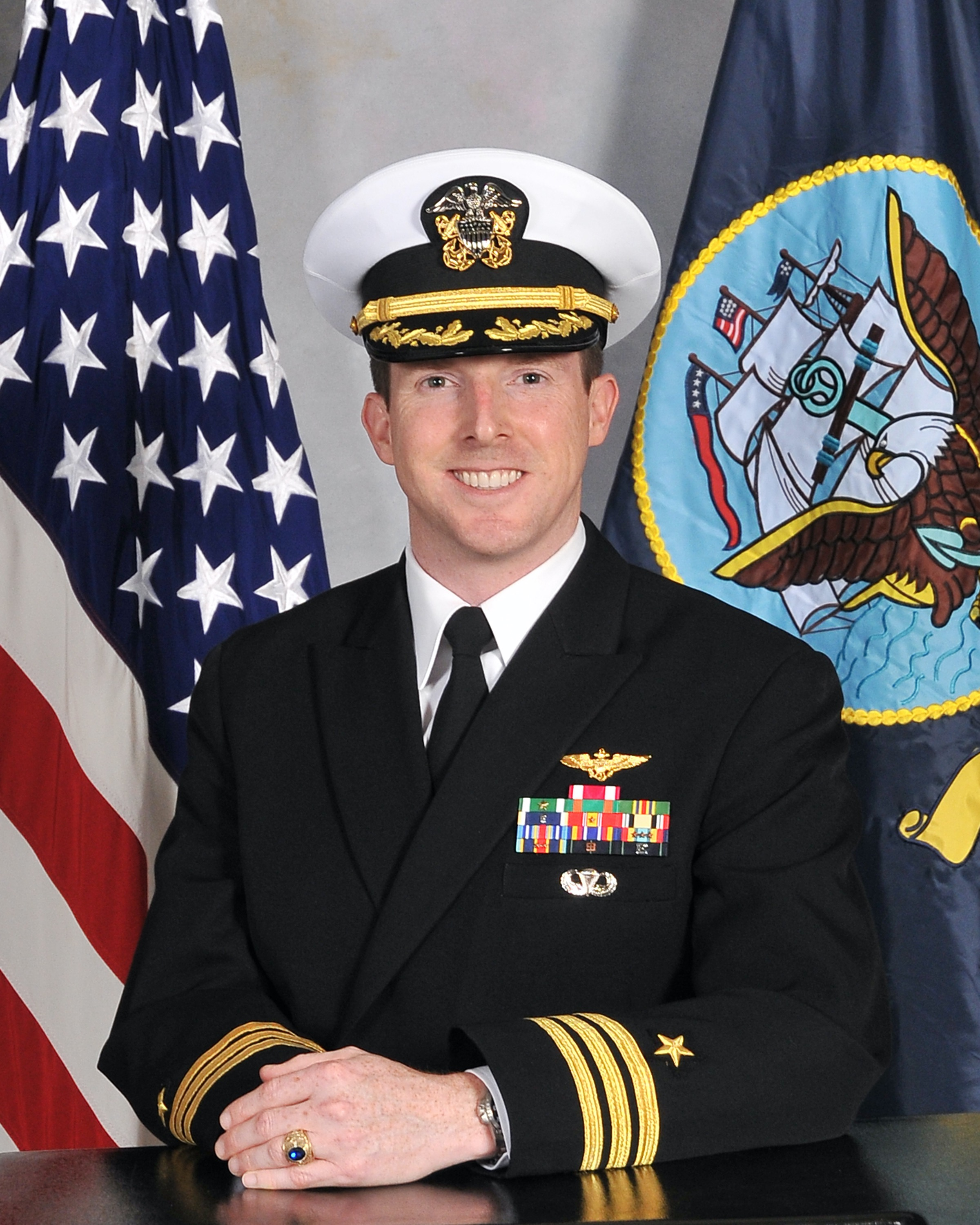
Guy Snodgrass

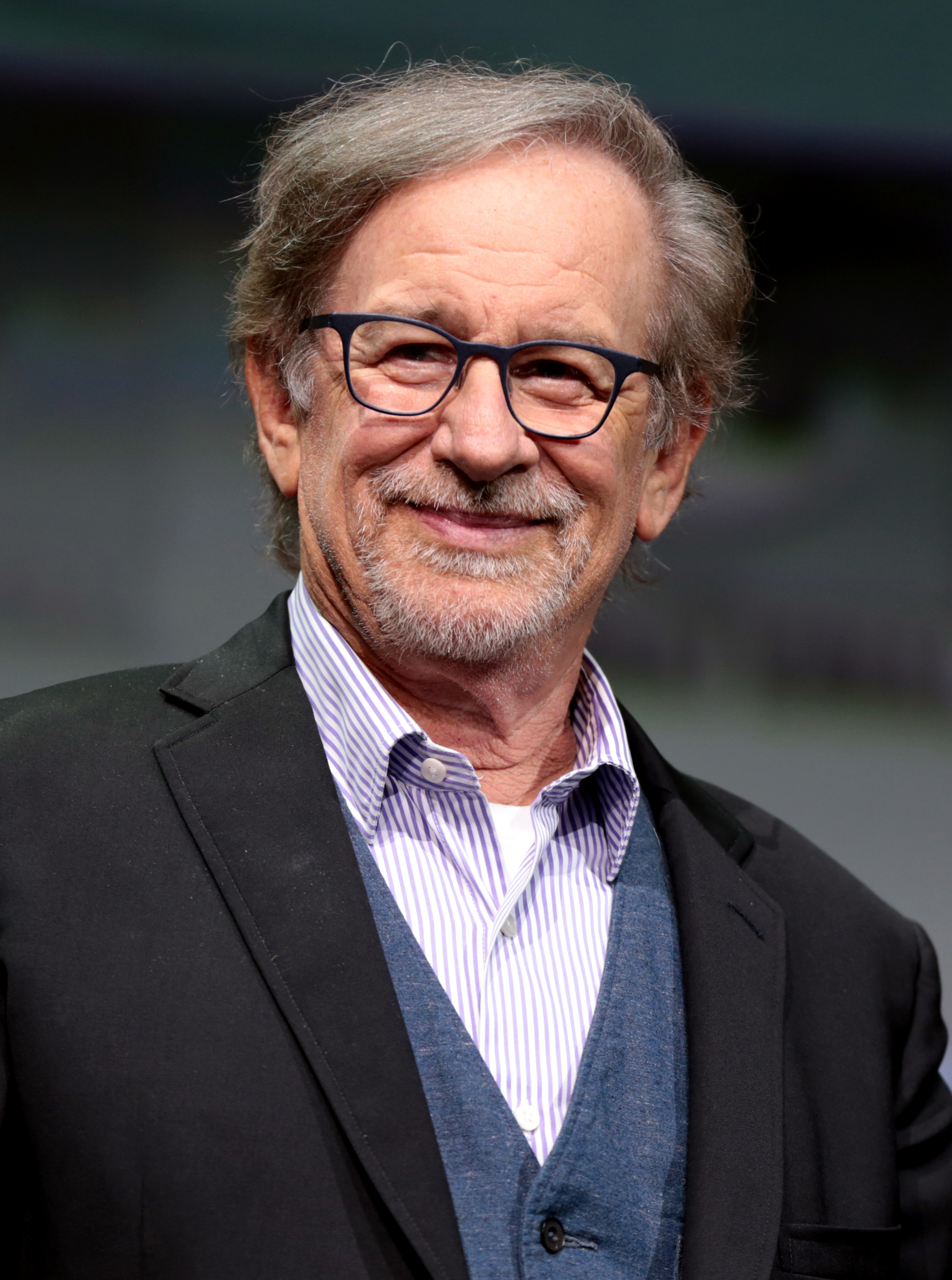
Steven Spielberg

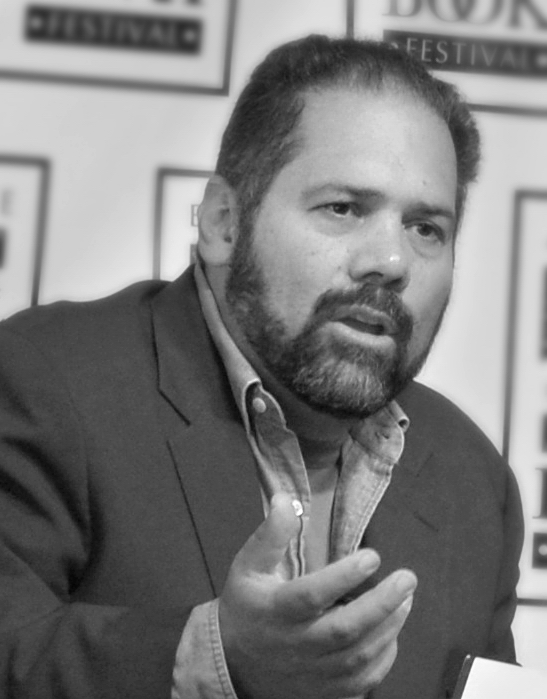
Ray Suarez

=== T ===
| Name | Eagle Scout | Awards | Notability | References |
|---|---|---|---|---|
| Joseph R. Tanner | 1966 c. | | Astronaut who flew on shuttle missions STS-66, STS-82, STS-97, add STS-115 | ^{[f]} |
| J. L. Tarr † | 1935 | Distinguished Eagle Scout Award | Professional Scouter for 43 years who served as the seventh Chief Scout Executive of the BSA | ^{[a]} |
| Thomas L. Tatham † | 1927 | Distinguished Eagle Scout Award | Attorney, Dade County land developer, and BSA Southeast Region vice president | |
| Manti Te'o | 2008 | | All-American linebacker for the University of Notre Dame and the NFL | |
| John Tesh | 1968 | | New Age and contemporary Christian musician and nationally syndicated radio host | ^{[a]} |
| Cy Thao | 1988 c. | | Laotian-born Hmong politician who served as a member of the Minnesota House of Representatives | ^{[e]} |
| Paul Theroux | 1955 | | Travel writer and novelist | |
| Glenn Thompson | 1977 | Distinguished Eagle Scout Award | Representative from Pennsylvania (2009–present) | ^{[a]} |
| Meldrim Thomson Jr. † | 1927 | | 73rd Governor of New Hampshire | |
| Leo K. Thorsness † | 1948 c. | Distinguished Eagle Scout Award | Air Force fighter pilot, Vietnam War prisoner of war, Medal of Honor recipient | ^{[a]} |
| Austin Tice | 1997 c. | | Marine Corps officer, recipient of the 2012 George Polk Award for War Reporting, the 2012 McClatchy Newspapers President's Award, and the 2015 National Press Club John Aubuchon Freedom of the Press Award | |
| Rex Tillerson | 1965 | Distinguished Eagle Scout Award | Chairman and CEO of ExxonMobil, United States Secretary of State | |
| Joseph E. Tofalo | 1977 c. | | Navy admiral; Commander, Submarine Group 10; 1977 American Legion Eagle Scout of the Year | |
| Pat Toomey | 1977 c. | | Senator from Pennsylvania (2011–2023). | |
| Travis Tope | 2010 | | Actor from Texas | |
| Alvin Townley | 1993 | | Writer, author of Legacy of Honor | ^{[e]} |
| David Trick | 1969 | | Canadian public servant, university administrator and author | |
| Scott Trimble | 1993 | | Location scout and location manager on such Hollywood movies as Transformers, Star Trek, and Iron Man 2 | |
| Kayden Troff | 2014 c. | | Chess grandmaster; World Youth Chess Championship (2012) | |
| Carlisle Trost † | 1947 | Distinguished Eagle Scout Award | Navy admiral; submariner; graduated first in his class in 1953 from both the United States Naval Academy and submarine officer school, 23rd Chief of Naval Operations (1996–2000) | ^{[a]} |
| Richard H. Truly † | 1952 | Distinguished Eagle Scout Award | Navy vice admiral; astronaut who flew on shuttle missions STS-2 and STS-8 and first former astronaut to head NASA | ^{[a]} |

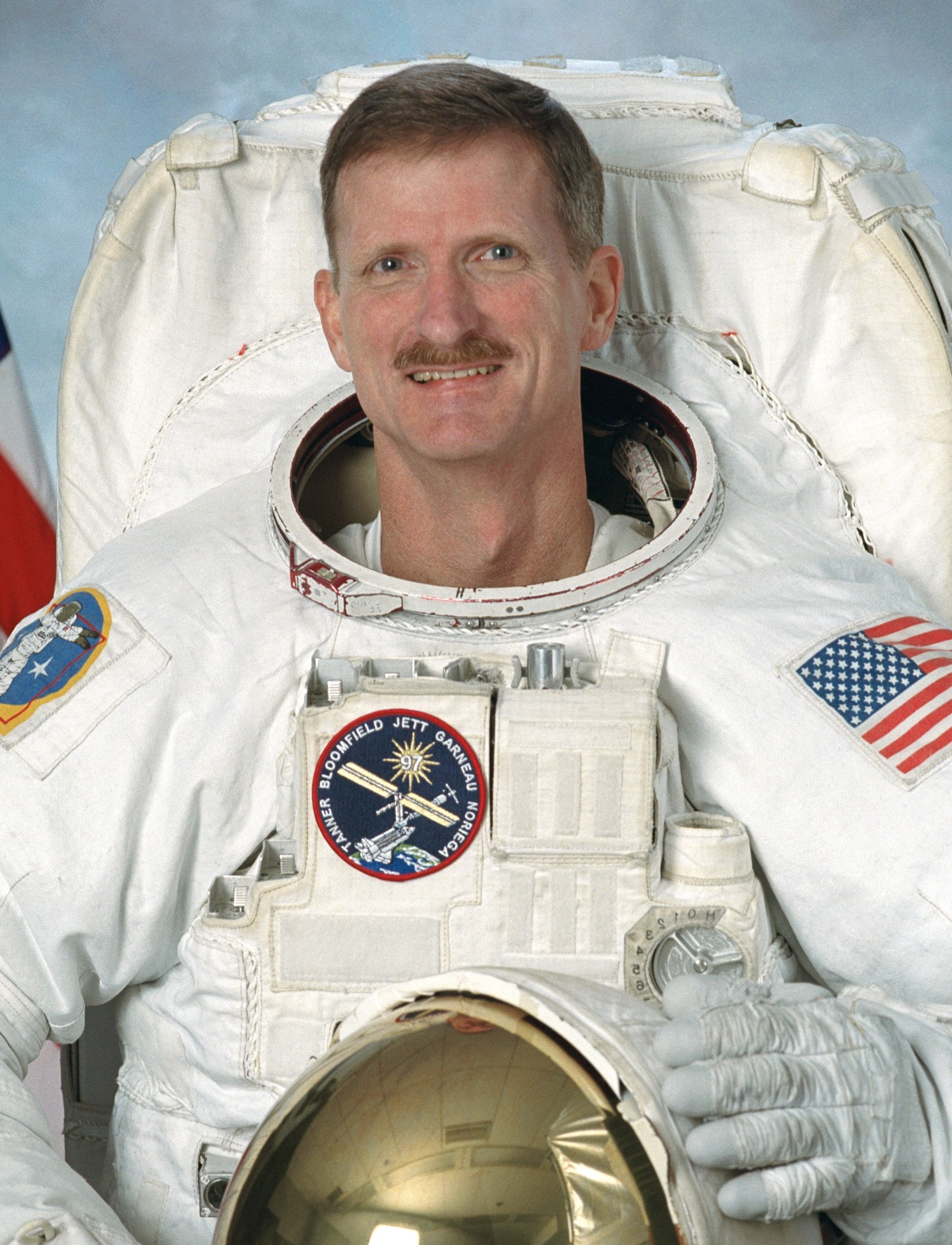
Joseph Tanner

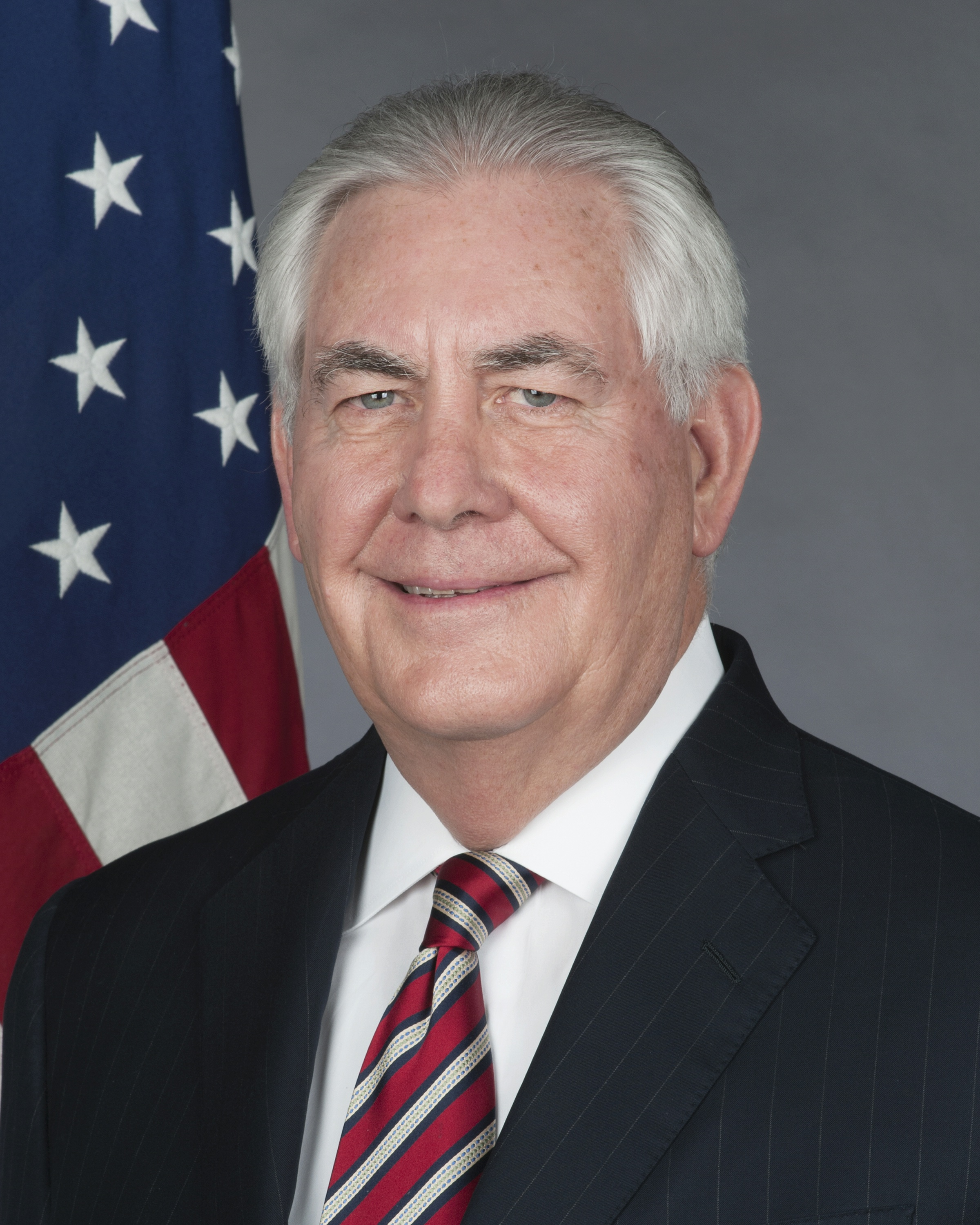
Rex Tillerson

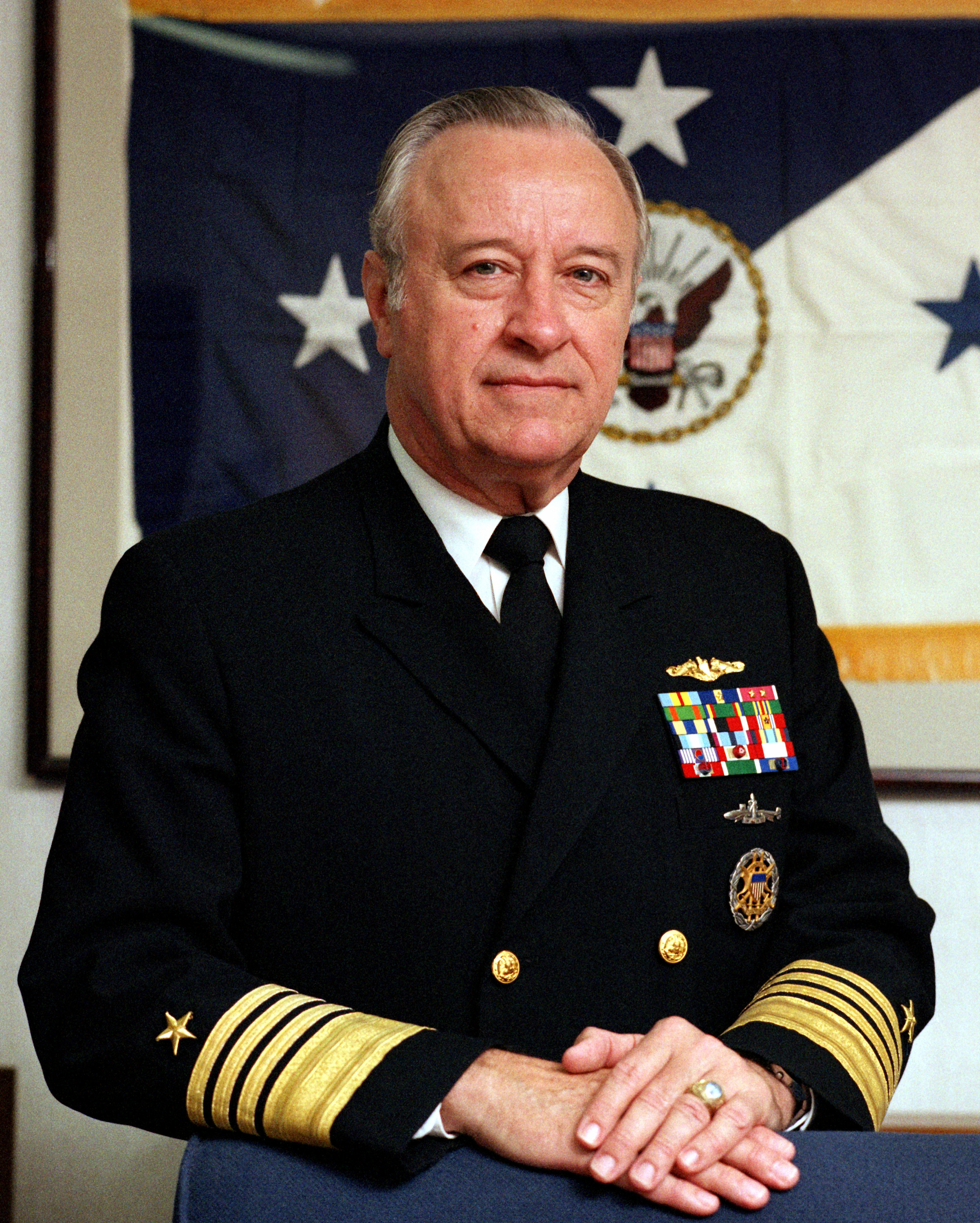
Carlisle Trost

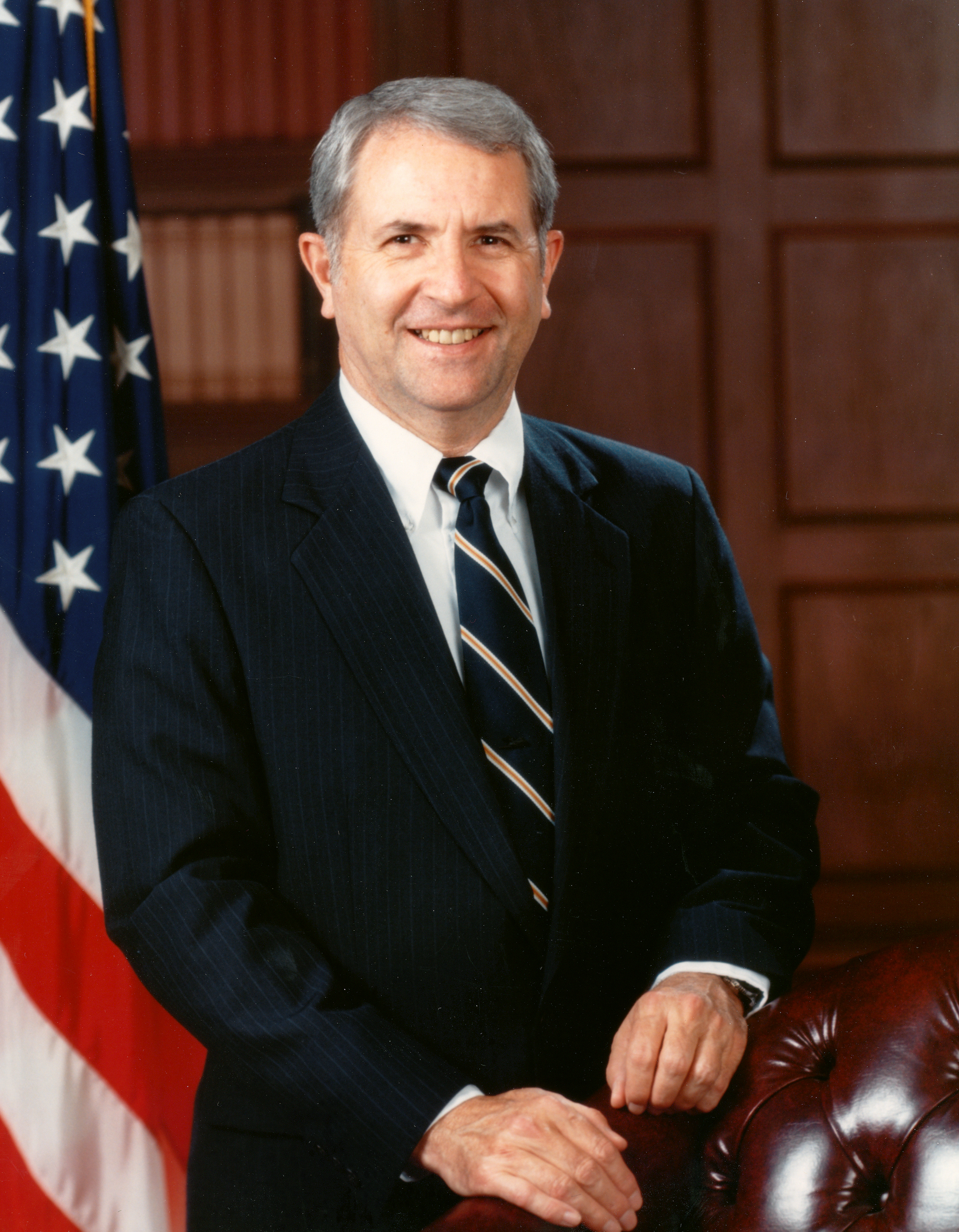
Richard Truly

=== U ===
| Name / Eagle Scout / Awards / Notability / References; Ross Ulbricht / 2002 / / Founder of the Silk Road black market |

=== V ===
| Name | Eagle Scout | Awards | Notability | References |
|---|---|---|---|---|
| James Valentine | 1996 | | Guitarist for Maroon 5 | |
| J. Kim Vandiver | 1960 | Distinguished Eagle Scout Award | Massachusetts Institute of Technology professor & engineer | ^{[a]} |
| Paul K. Van Riper | 1953 | | Marine Corps lieutenant general; Vietnam War veteran; commander 2nd Marine Division; commander Marine Corps Combat Development Command | |
| Victor Veysey † | 1929 | Distinguished Eagle Scout Award | Assistant Secretary for Civil Works for the Army; Secretary for Industrial Relations for California; Representative from California (1971–1975); member of the California State Assembly; professor at Caltech and Stanford University | ^{[a]} |
| Shane Victorino | 1996 | | Major League Baseball player, member of 2008 World Series and 2009 National League Championship Series-winning Philadelphia Phillies, member of the 2013 World Series winning Boston Red Sox. Two-time all-star and four-time Gold Glove recipient. | |
| Richard Vinroot | 1955 | Distinguished Eagle Scout Award | Attorney from Charlotte, North Carolina; Mayor of Charlotte | ^{[a]} |

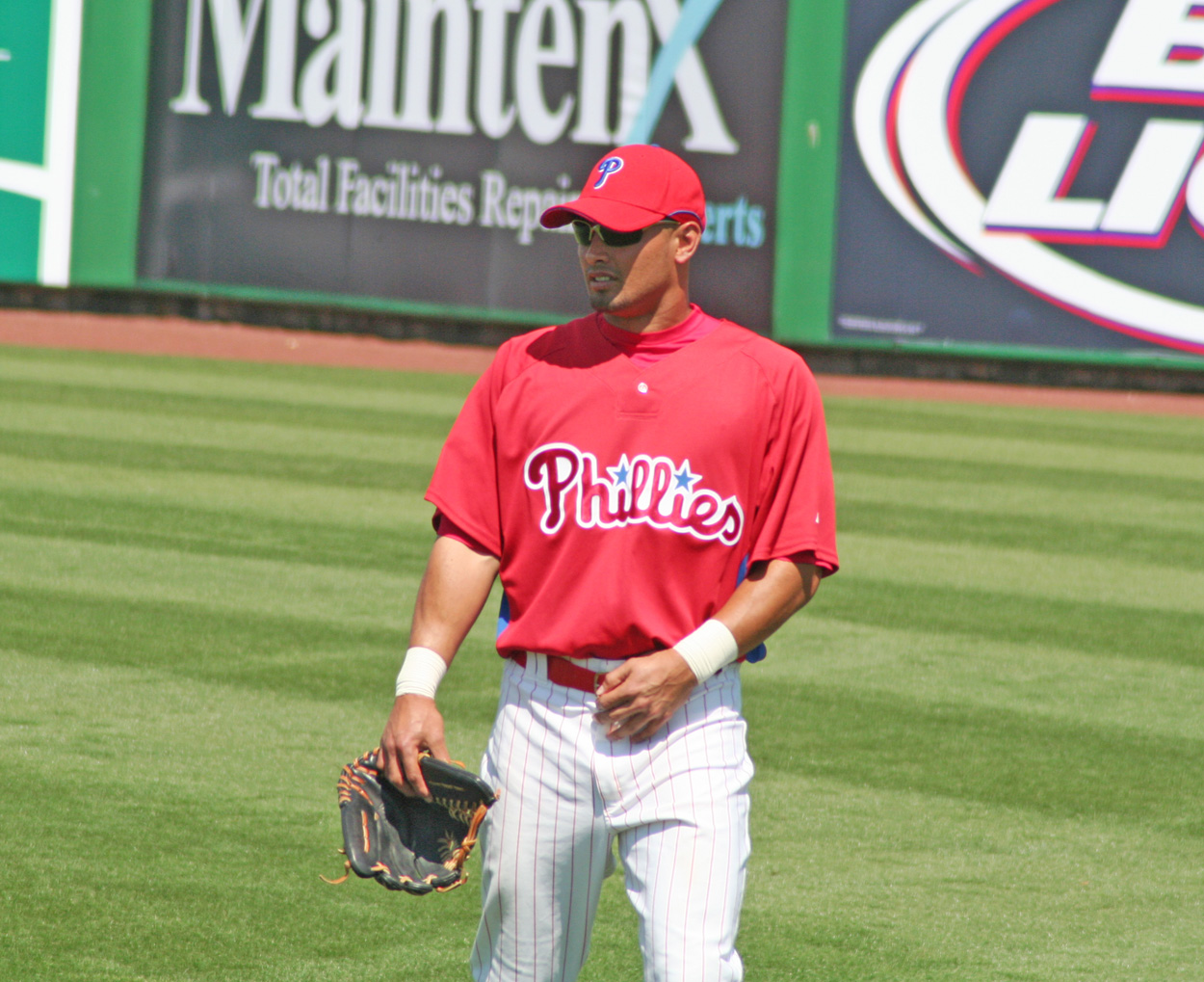
Shane Victorino

=== W ===
| Name | Eagle Scout | Awards | Notability | References |
|---|---|---|---|---|
| Frank H. Wadsworth † | 1933 | | American forester, conservationist and researcher. | |
| Zach Wahls | 2009 | | LGBT equality activist and politician | |
| John D. Waiheʻe III | 1960 | Distinguished Eagle Scout Award | 45th Governor of Hawaii (1st of Native Hawaiian descent) | ^{[a]} |
| Greg Walden | 1975 c. | | Representative from Oregon (1999–2021) | ^{[a]} |
| David M. Walker † | 1960 c. | | Astronaut who flew missions STS-51-A, STS-30, STS-53 and STS-69 | ^{[f]} |
| Scott Walker | 1985 | Distinguished Eagle Scout Award | 45th Governor of Wisconsin | |
| Sam Walton † | 1934 | Distinguished Eagle Scout Award | Founder of Walmart and Sam's Club, the world's largest employers | ^{[a]} |
| Ehren Watada | 1994 c. | | Army first lieutenant; first commissioned officer in the U.S. armed forces to publicly refuse deployment to Iraq, saying that he believed the Iraq War to be illegal | |
| Tripp Welborne | 1984 c. | | Collegiate (Michigan) and professional (Minnesota Vikings) American football player | |
| Larry D. Welch | 1948 | Distinguished Eagle Scout Award | Air Force general; president of the Institute for Defense Analyses; fighter pilot; Chief of Staff of the United States Air Force (1986–1990) | ^{[a]} |
| Togo D. West Jr. † | 1957 | Distinguished Eagle Scout Award | Attorney and public official, president of the Joint Center for Political and Economic Studies; Secretary of the Army (1993–1997); Secretary of Veterans Affairs (1998–2000) | ^{[a]}^{[d]} |
| William Westmoreland † | 1930 | Distinguished Eagle Scout Award | Army general; commanded US military operations in the Vietnam War at its peak; served as Army Chief of Staff (1968–1972) | ^{[a]} |
| Andrew R. Wheeler | 1980 c. | | Administrator of the Environmental Protection Agency | |
| Ted Wheeler | 1976 c. | | Mayor of Portland, Oregon | |
| Ken Whisenhunt | 1976 | | Football coach for the Tennessee Titans; head coach of the Arizona Cardinals (2007–2012); Super Bowl XL and Super Bowl XLIII | |
| Peter J. White | 2000 c. | | Attorney, pilot, and Senior Policy Analyst and aerospace advisor for President Donald Trump. | |
| John C. Whitehead † | 1937 | Distinguished Eagle Scout Award | Chairman of the National September 11 Memorial & Museum; chairman of Lower Manhattan Development Corporation and Goldman Sachs; veteran of World War II | ^{[a]} |
| Charles Whitman † | 1953–1954 c. | | Spree killer known as the University of Texas tower sniper | |
| E. Royce Williams | 1941 | NESA Outstanding Eagle Scout Award | United States Navy naval aviator; recipient of the Congressional Medal of Honor. | |
| E. O. Wilson † | 1944 | Distinguished Eagle Scout Award | Biologist, researcher, theorist, naturalist; two-time winner of the Pulitzer Prize | ^{[a]} |
| Walter Wriston † | 1934 | Distinguished Eagle Scout Award | Chairman of Citicorp | ^{[a]} |
| Wyn Wiley | 2014 c. | | Drag queen and activist for LGBT+ and environmentalist causes | |
| Charles D. Wurster | 1967 | Distinguished Eagle Scout Award | Coast Guard vice admiral; National Commodore of the Sea Scouting division of the Boy Scouts of America | ^{[a]} |

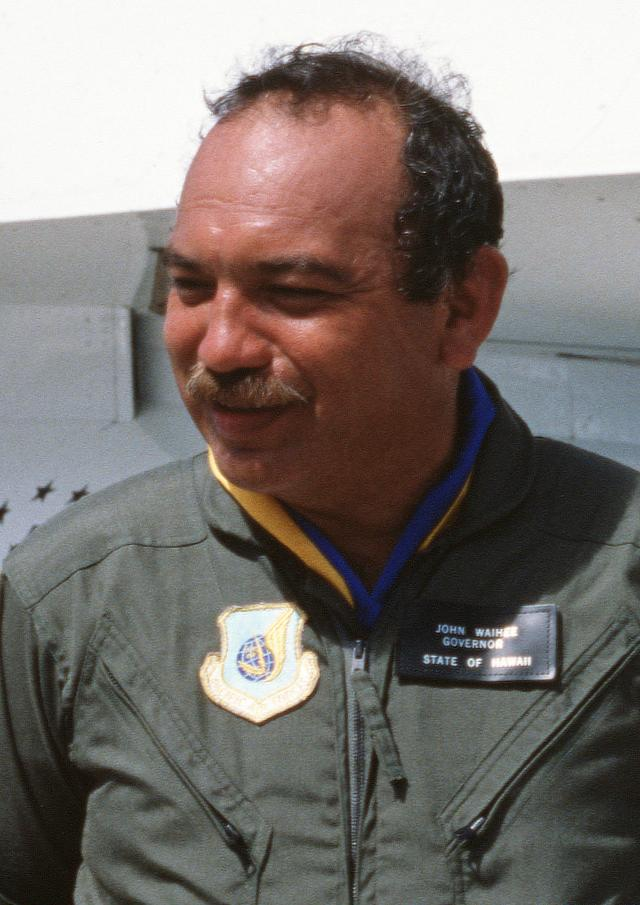
John Waihee

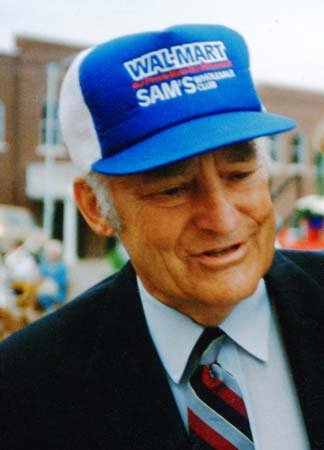
Sam Walton

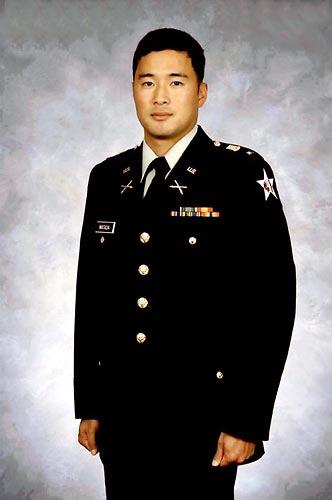
Ehren Watada

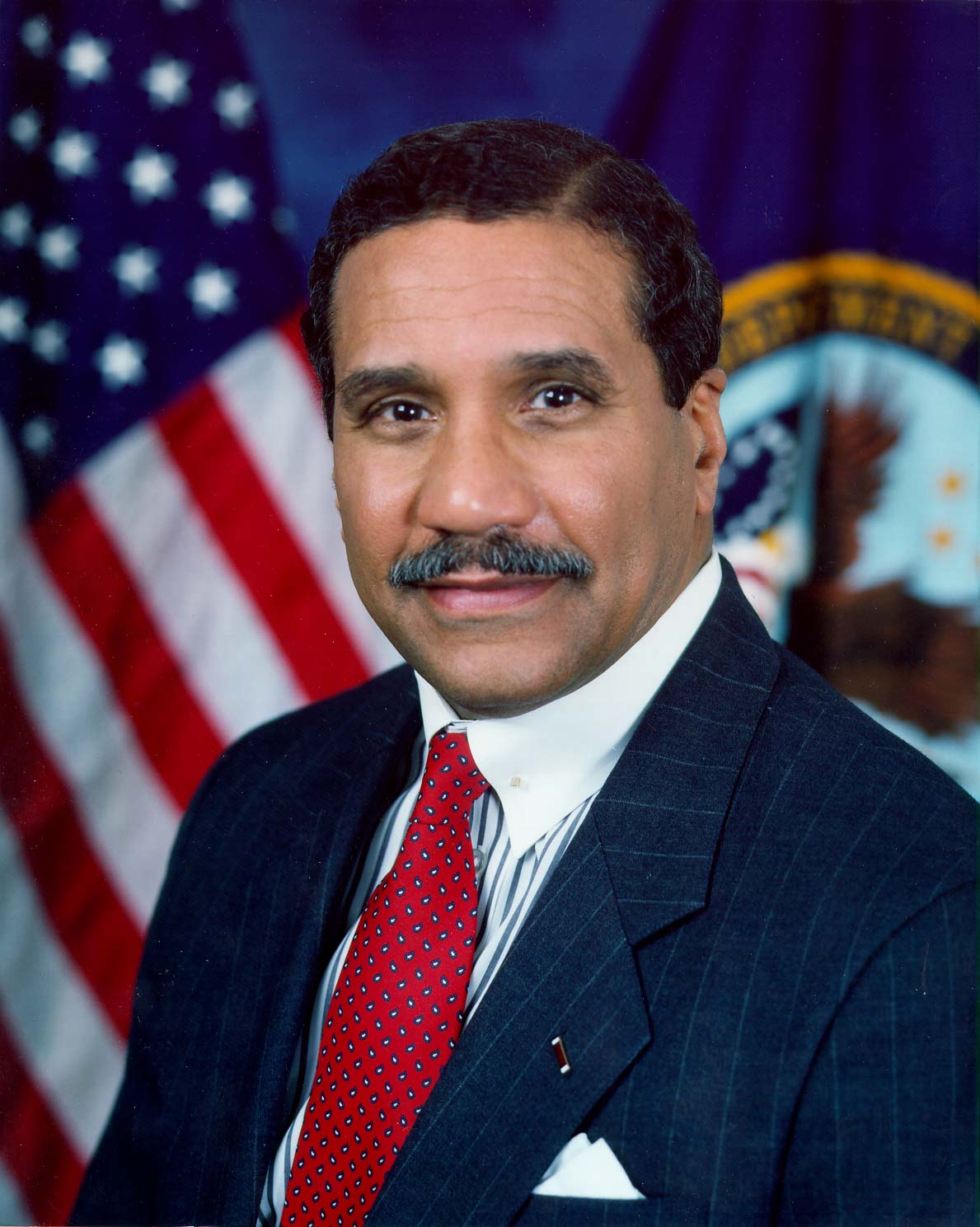
Togo D. West

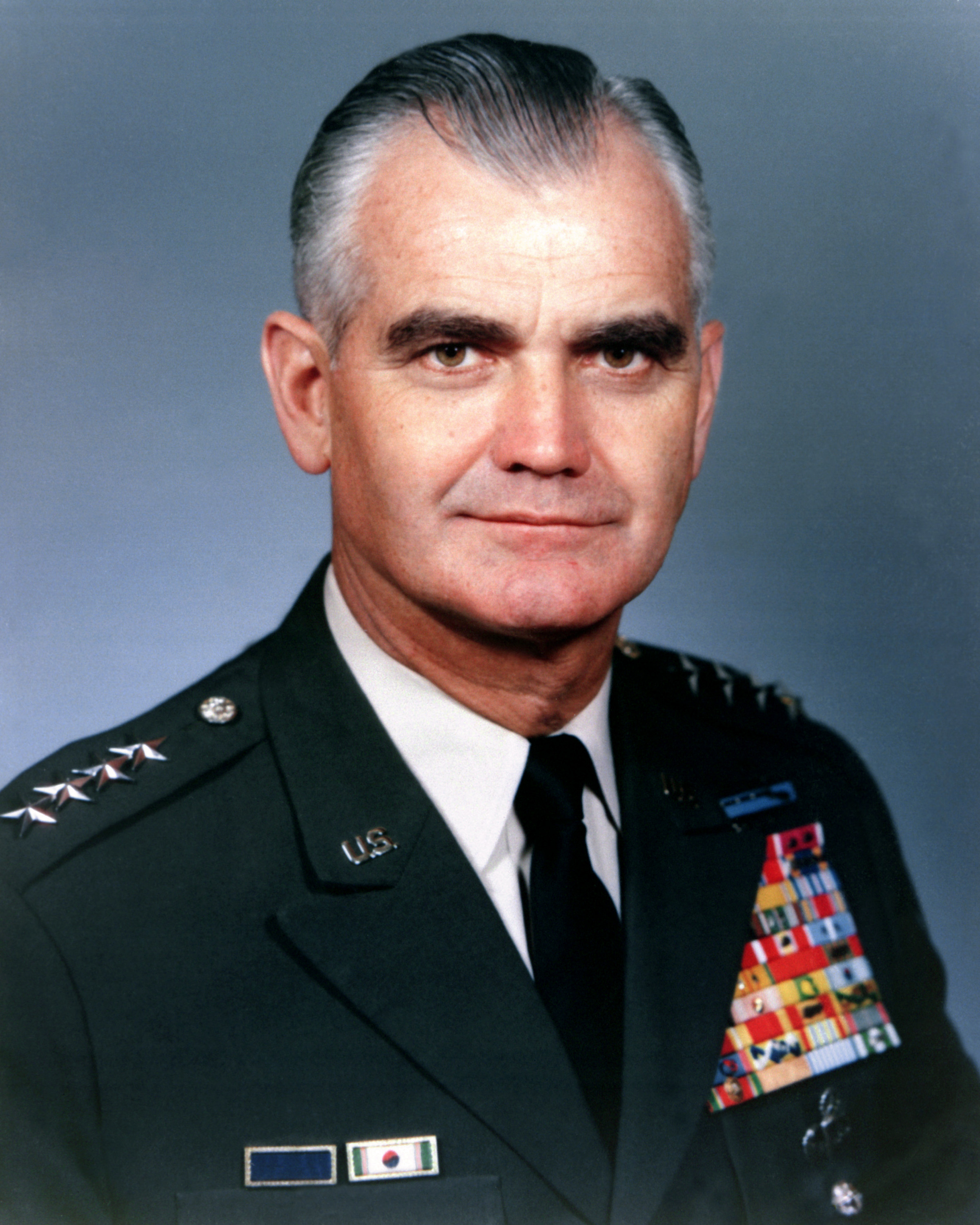
William Westmoreland

=== Y ===
| Name | Eagle Scout | Awards | Notability | References |
|---|---|---|---|---|
| Ronald D. Young | 1994 | | Motivational speaker; former Army warrant officer pilot who became a prisoner of war in the 2003 invasion of Iraq | |
| Pat Young | 2000 | | Maryland politician | |

=== Z ===
| Name | Eagle Scout | Awards | Notability | References |
|---|---|---|---|---|
| Jay Zeamer Jr. † | 1932 | | Army Air Forces lieutenant colonel; pilot during World War II who was awarded the Medal of Honor | |
| Ryan Zinke | 1976 c. | | Representative from Montana; U.S. Secretary of the Interior | ^{[a]} |
| Roger H. Zion † | 1932 | | Representative from Indiana (1967–1975) | |
| Elmo Zumwalt † | 1937 | Distinguished Eagle Scout Award | Navy admiral; 19th Chief of Naval Operations (1970–1974) | ^{[a]} |

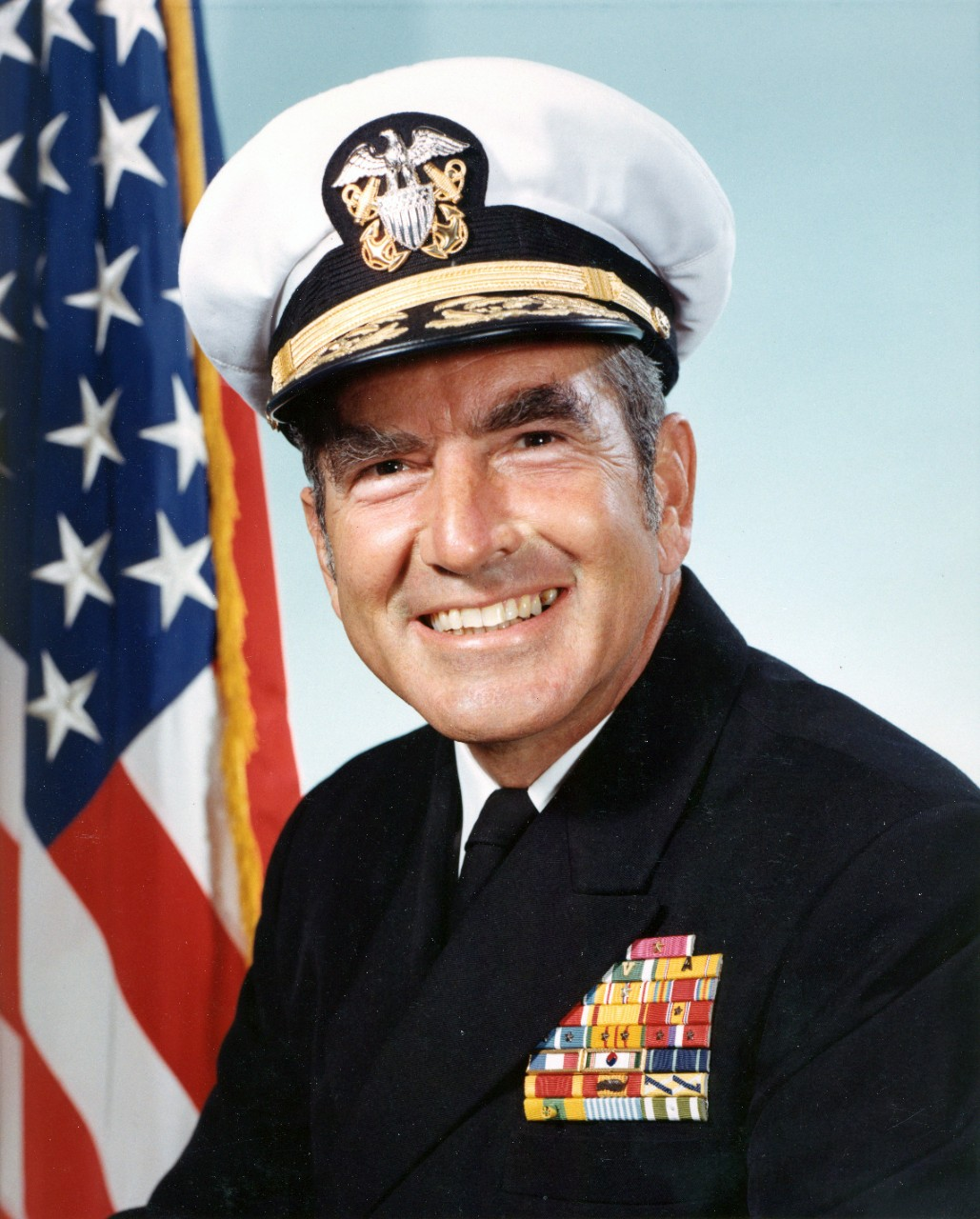
Elmo Zumwalt

== African American Eagle Scouts ==
The Boy Scouts did not track the race of scouts who earned the rank of Eagle. For many years it was thought that Edgar Cunningham, who earned his rank in 1926 as a member of Troop 12 in Waterloo, Iowa in what was then Wapsipinicon Area Council, was the first African American recipient of the Eagle rank.

In February 2020, it was discovered that Harry Cooper of the Kansas City Council, became an Eagle Scout in September 1920. In the Kansas City Council (now the Heart of America Council) newsletter dated 1920, Harry Cooper of Troop 92 was listed as a new Eagle Scout as of September. The newsletter lists him as the only African American Eagle Scout in Kansas City, one of only ten Eagle Scouts in Kansas City, Missouri at the time.

In March 2020, further research showed that the Eagle Scout court of honor for Hamilton Bradley of the Rome Council, was held on December 19, 1919, in Rome, New York. This makes Bradley the earliest known African American Eagle Scout.

Dr. Frank "Tick" Coleman, who earned his Eagle in 1926 is one of the first four known African American Eagle Scouts.

== Incorrectly regarded as an Eagle Scout ==
These persons, while notable in themselves, are sometimes incorrectly listed as having earned the award:

- Henry "Hank" Aaron; retired baseball player and member of the Baseball Hall of Fame. He is a recipient of the Silver Buffalo Award. He is often thought to be an Eagle Scout because of an advertisement he did for the BSA.
- Walter Cronkite; anchorman, journalist and commentator.
- Henry Fonda; actor and Academy Award winner who was a Scout and Scoutmaster. Incorrectly noted as an Eagle Scout by his daughter.
- Bill Gates; Life Scout and co-founder of Microsoft. He is sometimes confused with his father, William H. Gates Sr. who is a Distinguished Eagle Scout. He is often thought to be an Eagle Scout because of an advertisement he did for the BSA.

== See also ==
- Scouting in popular culture § Fictional Eagle Scouts
- List of Alpha Phi Omega members (Alpha Phi Omega is a coed service fraternity based on principles derived from the BSA)
- List of Scouts
- Notable Gold Award recipients (the Gold Award is the highest achievement within the Girl Scouts of the USA)
- List of highest scouting awards by country
