= Menninger (surname) =

Menninger is a surname. Notable people with the surname, or its variant Meninger, include:

== People ==
- Bonar Menninger, author of the 1992 nonfiction book Mortal Error: The Shot That Killed JFK
- Carl Menninger, American director and playwright
- Charles Frederick Menninger (1862–1953), physician who co-founded the Menninger Foundation
  - Karl Menninger (1893–1990), American psychiatrist, son of Charles, co-founder of the Menninger Foundation
  - William C. Menninger (1899–1966), son of Charles, co-founder of the Menninger Foundation
- Henry J. Menninger (1838–1889), German-American physician, pharmacist, politician, newspaper editor, and merchant
- Karl Menninger (mathematics) (1898–1963), German mathematics teacher and writer
- Roy W. Menninger (1926–2024), American medical doctor and psychiatrist
- W. Walter Menninger (born 1931), American psychiatrist
- William Meninger (1932–2021), Trappist monk and author

== Fictional characters ==
- Thalia Menninger, in The Many Loves of Dobie Gillis (1959-1963)
