= Roy W. Menninger =

American medical doctor and psychiatrist (1926–2024)

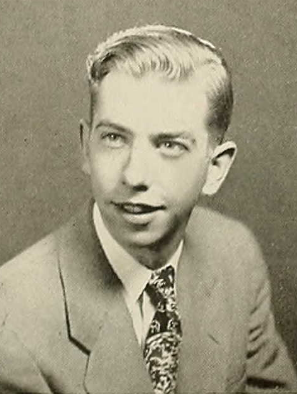
- Menninger in 1947
- Born: October 27, 1926; Topeka, Kansas, U.S.
- Died: October 24, 2024 (aged 97); Topeka, Kansas, U.S.
- Education: Swarthmore College; Cornell University Medical College
- Medical career
- Profession: Medicine
- Field: Psychiatry
- Institutions: Menninger Clinic

Roy Wright Menninger (October 27, 1926 – October 24, 2024) was an American medical doctor and psychiatrist. He served as president and CEO of the Menninger Foundation from 1967 to 1993.

== Early life and education ==
Roy Wright Menninger was born on October 27, 1926, as the first of three sons to William C. Menninger and his wife Catherine Wright, while they lived in New York. His father was completing an internship at Bellevue Hospital. The family returned to Topeka, Kansas in 1927, when his father joined the Menninger Clinic, with his brother Karl Menninger and father Charles Frederick Menninger. Menninger grew up in the world of medicine and psychiatry.

Menninger graduated from Swarthmore College in 1947 and from the Cornell University Medical College in 1951. He interned at New York Hospital in New York City and served his residency in psychiatry at Boston State Hospital and Boston Psychopathic Hospital. He was married in June 1951 to Ann Catherine Colwell.

== Career ==
Early in his career, Menninger served as a teaching and research fellow at Harvard Medical School. He also served on the staff of the Peter Bent Brigham Hospital in Boston. From 1953 to 1955, he served as a psychiatrist with the United States Army, including a tour of duty in Salzburg, Austria. Following his military service, he studied neurology in London.

Beginning in 1961, he served as a staff psychiatrist of the C.F. Menninger Memorial Hospital in Topeka, Kansas. In March 1964, he also became co-director of the Menninger Foundation's Division of School Mental Health. He became a nationally recognized expert on psychiatric issues relating to suicide stress, and personal satisfaction.

In 1967, he was elected as president and CEO of the Menninger Foundation, operator of the Menninger Clinic and Menninger Hospital. During his time as president, the Menninger Clinic was recognized as "one of the major psychiatric treatment and teaching facilities in the world." Also under his leadership, the foundation successfully raised funds on a national basis to build a new $23-million hospital (completed in 1982) and underwent major expansion, extending its work to include group psychotherapy, family therapy, biofeedback, a halfway house, short-term psychotherapy, and an alcohol and drug rehabilitation program. The Foundation grew during his presidency to 1,100 employees, a $65 million annual budget, and an endowment of $90 million.

Lawrence J. Friedman, author of a book on the Menningers, characterized Roy Menninger's presidency as one in which the concern for fundraising and building construction was greater than that for psychiatric research. Menninger said that he found Friedman's book "distasteful" and "a gossipy tabloid portrayal" of the family and foundation.

In 1993, Menninger retired as president and CEO, and his brother, W. Walter Menninger, took over as president. He remained as chairman of the foundation's board of trustees, overseeing the foundation's move to Houston in the early 2000s as part of a partnership with Baylor College of Medicine and the Methodist Health Care System.

Menninger and John Nemiah co-edited the book American Psychiatry after World War II, 1944–1994.

== Death ==
Menninger died on October 24, 2024, at the age of 97.
