= Diana Fosha =

American psychologist

- Born: Bucharest, Romania
- Known for: Accelerated experiential dynamic psychotherapy

Academic work
- Discipline: Psychology
- Sub-discipline: Psychotherapy

Diana Foșha is a Romanian-American psychologist, known for developing accelerated experiential dynamic psychotherapy (AEDP), and for her work on the psychotherapy of adults suffering the effects of childhood attachment trauma and abuse.

== Education and career ==
Fosha was born in Bucharest, but her family emigrated to the United States when she was 12 years old, settling in New York City. She studied psychology at Barnard College and then went on to complete a doctorate in clinical psychology at the City College of New York. She also undertook post-doctoral training with Habib Davanloo, the developer of a form of psychodynamic psychotherapy called intensive short-term dynamic psychotherapy.

In her early career Fosha held teaching positions at the City College of New York and Adelphi University. She was also an adjunct professor of psychiatry at Bellevue Hospital, and was on the faculty of New York University and the St. Luke's–Roosevelt Hospital Center.

== Accelerated experiential dynamic psychotherapy ==
Fosha developed a theory and technique of psychotherapy, accelerated experiential dynamic psychotherapy (AEDP), based upon several conceptual premises as points of departure from the prevailing psychodynamic psychotherapies. Her theory of how healing occurs in psychotherapy derives from her interpretation of research findings in several areas: the neuroscience of attachment, caregiver–infant interaction research, positive psychology, emotion research, psychotherapy research findings on therapist qualities associated with positive therapy outcomes, and phenomenology of the psychological experience of sudden change. The AEDP Institute is actively engaged in ongoing research evaluating the effectiveness of AEDP.

Her core premise is that the desire to heal and grow is a wired-in capacity, which she calls the transformance drive. Emotional healing and brain re-wiring the patient, with the help of the therapist, is able to experience, in a regulated manner, emotions that had been blocked due to traumatic overwhelm. Healing is accelerated through a tracking of emerging affect, so the patient can have a complete emotional experience, and then reflect upon the experience of healing change itself, with the help of the therapist. Fosha terms this technique meta-therapeutic processing.

The AEDP Institute was formed in New York City in 2004. The institute has satellite institutes throughout the US, and in Brazil, Canada, France, Italy, Sweden, Israel, China, and Japan.

== Selected bibliography ==
=== Books ===
- Fosha, D. (2000). The Transforming Power of Affect: A Model For Accelerated Change. Basic Books
- Fosha, D, Siegel, D., Solomon M., Eds. (2009). The Healing Power of Emotion: Affective Neuroscience, Development & Clinical Practice. New York: W.W. Norton & Co.
- Prenn, N., Fosha, D. (2016). Supervision Essentials for Accelerated Experiential Dynamic Psychotherapy. Part of the Clinical Supervision Essentials Series. American Psychological Association, Washington, D.C.
- Fosha, D. (2021). Undoing Aloneness and the Transformation of Suffering Into Flourishing: AEDP 2.0. American Psychological Association, Washington, D.C. AAP Prose Award Winner.

=== Articles ===
- Fosha, D. (2001). The dyadic regulation of affect. Journal of Clinical Psychology/In Session. 57 (2), pages 227–242.
- Fosha, D. (2001). Trauma reveals the roots of resilience. Special September 11 Issue. Constructivism in the Human Sciences. 6 (1 & 2), pages 7–15.
- Fosha, D. (2004). "Nothing that feels bad is ever the last step": The role of positive emotions in experiential work with difficult emotional experiences. Special issue on Emotion, L. Greenberg (Ed.). Clinical Psychology and Psychotherapy. 11, pages 30–43.
- Fosha, D. (2004). Brief integrative psychotherapy comes of age: reflections. Journal of Psychotherapy Integration. 14, pages 66–92.
- Fosha, D. (2005). Emotion, true self, true other, core state: toward a clinical theory of affective change process. Psychoanalytic Review. 92 (4), pages 513–552.
