= W. Walter Menninger =

American psychiatrist

- Born: October 23, 1931 (age 94); Topeka, Kansas
- Education: Stanford University; Cornell University Medical College
- Medical career
- Profession: Medicine
- Field: Psychiatry
- Institutions: Topeka State Hospital; Menninger Clinic

William Walter Menninger (born October 23, 1931), known by his peers as "Dr. Walt", is an American psychiatrist in the third generation of the Menninger family, which has run the Menninger Foundation since 1925. He served as dean of the Karl Menninger School of Psychiatry and Mental Health Science and he was the CEO of the Menninger Clinic from 1993 to 2001. During his tenure as CEO, the clinic began negotiations to move from Topeka, Kansas, to Houston, Texas. The clinic was moved in 2003, and is now affiliated with Baylor College of Medicine.

Menninger has special interests in psychoanalysis and forensic psychiatry. He has served on several boards or committees related to prisons, police work and violence prevention. His research with Peace Corps volunteers resulted in his development of the Menninger morale curve, a schematic used to predict responses among people who are in new environments. Menninger wrote a nationally syndicated newspaper column for several years; he has served as editor of Psychiatry Digest and the Bulletin of the Menninger Clinic.

== Early life and education ==
William Walter Menninger was born in 1931 in Topeka, Kansas, to William C. Menninger (known to family friends as "Dr. Will") and the former Catherine Wright. Dr. Will practiced general medicine and psychiatry, and he had opened the Menninger Clinic in 1925, along with Menninger's uncle Karl and grandfather C. F. Menninger.

Menninger attended Stanford University, where he graduated in 1953. He joined Alpha Phi Omega. He wrote for The Stanford Daily for four years and ultimately served as its managing editor. He earned a medical degree from Cornell University Medical College.

== Career ==
=== Early career ===
Early in his career, Menninger became affiliated with Topeka State Hospital. In the early 1970s, he spoke out about budget cuts that affected the training and hiring of personnel at the hospital. By that time, Menninger was also seeing psychiatric patients at his family's Menninger Foundation. By the mid-1970s, Menninger had taken leave from the foundation to focus on administration of the state hospital.

Menninger conducted research on the morale of volunteers in the Peace Corps and in Volunteers in Service to America. As a result, he created the Menninger morale curve, which reflects the responses that can be expected when a person faces life changes. Menninger created a curve for positive life changes and one for negative changes. The curves identify four crisis points that a person must surmount when entering a new environment.

=== Menninger Foundation ===
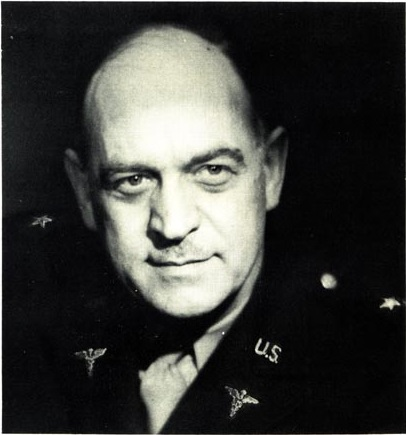
William C. Menninger, Walter's father

Menninger's grandfather, C. F. Menninger; father, William C. Menninger; and uncle, Karl Menninger, established The Menninger Foundation in 1925 in Topeka, Kansas. After years of managing the large state hospital, in 1993 Walt succeeded his older brother, Roy W. Menninger, as the leader of the foundation. Menninger named Efrain Bleiberg as the president of the organization. He realized that he was probably the last family member to lead the organization; his plan included grooming Bleiberg for the CEO position when he decided to step down.

Retiring from the Menninger Foundation in 2001, Menninger became the chairman of Menninger Trustees. Menninger had begun negotiating with Baylor College of Medicine on an affiliation agreement that would allow the hospital to move to Houston. While his older brother Roy was bothered by the move, Walt Menninger backed the change in location; he thought that the facility would be out of business would be out of business in a few years if it stayed in Topeka. Consultants had recommended that the clinic be moved to an urban area near a medical school and an airport. In the summer of 2001, negotiations between Menninger and Baylor were briefly called off, but the two institutions were able to work out an affiliation and Menninger moved to Houston in 2003.

Relationships between the Menninger brothers and with other family members have sometimes been contentious, especially over moving the clinic after decades in Topeka, determining where to locate its archives, and the leadership of the organization in general. Psychiatrist William Simpson has described the battles at the Menninger Clinic, saying, "First Dr. Roy pushed Dr. Walt aside, and he went into exile at the state mental hospital. Then Dr. Walt [came back and] pushed Dr. Roy aside."

=== Other affiliations and awards ===
Menninger was the editor of Psychiatry Digest for several years in the 1970s. He authored close to 1,000 articles in a national newspaper column known as In-Sights in the 1970s and 1980s. He served as editor of the Bulletin of the Menninger Clinic for more than ten years until 2014. He has specific interests in psychoanalysis, forensic psychiatry and administrative psychiatry. He was called as an expert witness at the competency hearing of Sara Jane Moore.

Menninger served on the U.S. National Commission on the Causes and Prevention of Violence and was a consultant to the Federal Bureau of Prisons. He was a member of the board of trustees of the National Committee for the Prevention of Child Abuse (now PCA America). He is on the board of directors for the Police Foundation, a nonprofit organization that works to enhance policing techniques. In 1982, he testified before the Kansas legislature in support of the establishment of the guilty but mentally ill legal verdict.

Menninger is president of the Tower Mental Health Foundation, which assists mental health organizations in Kansas. He was also a member of the Boy Scouts of America National Health and Safety Committee. He served on the BSA Executive Board and is a recipient of the Distinguished Eagle Scout Award and the BSA Silver Buffalo Award.

Menninger has received honorary doctorates from Dominican University, Middlebury College, Washburn University, Ottawa University and Heidelberg College. He received the Distinguished Service Award from the American Psychiatric Association.

== Personal ==
Menninger met his wife Connie while attending Stanford University. They had six children together: Fritz, John, Eliza, Marian, Will, and David. Eliza Menninger became a psychiatrist affiliated with Harvard Medical School. Connie Menninger died in 2008.

Menninger's memoir, Like What You Do, was published in September 2024. It was co-authored by freelance writer Todd Fertig. Fertig became interested in Menninger as a subject when he moved in to Menninger's childhood home in Topeka and reached out to Menninger to ask him about the home.

== Popular culture ==
Menninger served as a consultant for the 2013 film adaptation of The Great Gatsby, which begins and ends in a sanatorium based on the Menninger Clinic. As a nod to Menninger, the psychiatrist in the movie is named Walter Perkins.

== Selected publications ==
- Menninger, W. W. (1976). Happiness Without Sex: And Other Things Too Good to Miss. Sheed Andrews and McMeel.
- Menninger, W. W. (ed.) (1987). Military Psychiatry: Learning from Experience. Menninger Foundation.
- Menninger, W. W. (ed.) (1996). Coping with Anxiety: Integrated Approaches to Treatment. J. Aronson.
