= David Malan =

David Malan may refer to:

- David J. Malan, Professor of Computer Science at Harvard University
- David H. Malan (1922–2020), British psychotherapist

May also refer to:

- Dawid Malan (born 1987), an English cricketer who has played for England, Middlesex and Yorkshire.
