= Fosha =

Fosha may be:

- a diminutive form of the name Agafon
- a surname:
  - Diana Fosha, American psychologist

== See also ==
- Foixà, pronounced "fosha" in Catalan, a village in Catalonia, Spain
