= Monninger =

Monninger is a surname. Notable people with the surname include:

- Joseph Monninger (1953–2025), American writer
- Nikki Monninger (fl. from 2000), American rock musician, member of Silversun Pickups

== See also ==
- Menninger (surname)
