= Karl Targownik =

American physician

- Born: Karl Kalman Targownik; June 17, 1915; Budapest, Hungary
- Died: January 2, 1996 (aged 80)
- Occupation: Psychiatrist

Karl Kalman Targownik (June 17, 1915 – January 2, 1996) was a psychiatrist and Holocaust survivor.

Dr. Karl Targownik was born in Budapest, Hungary. His parents were Polish Jews who fled to Hungary to escape the Russian invasion during World War I. Soon after the War was over they returned to Poland and settled in the small village of Bochnia, located in the Southwest of Poland near Kraków. While studying in Poland to become a medical doctor, Targownik was captured and sent to a concentration camp. For a period of time, Targownik was a prisoner at the infamous Auschwitz camp. At 29 years old and a mere 80 pounds (36 kg), Targownik was liberated on April 29, 1945 from the Dachau camp.

Soon after liberation, Targownik obtained his medical degree and practiced in New York City. In 1952, Targownik moved to Topeka, Kansas, to work at the Menninger Clinic, a popular treatment center for the mentally ill. He developed a friendship with Karl Menninger, and soon rose through the ranks to become one of the institution's top psychiatrists. Targownik frequently spoke to groups about his Holocaust experience, and gained recognition throughout the state of Kansas and much of the Midwest. He was named Kansan of the Year in 1976 by the newspaper of Topeka, Kansas.

Dr. Targownik worked and led the Kansas Reception & Diagnostic Center, a State Prison outside of Topeka. It was one of the few remaining institutions for new, incoming state prisoners, where they could be evaluated medically, psychologically and educationally. A team of clinicians would then recommend the level of placement in the state prison system. This Reception & Diagnostic concept followed from Dr. Karl Menninger's philosophy of criminal rehabilitation, as written about in his book, "The Crime of Punishment"

Targownik continued to speak and give interviews through the end of his life, which was complicated by Alzheimer's and Parkinson's diseases. He died at 80 on January 2, 1996, at his Topeka home.
