= Love Against Hate =

1942 book by Karl Menninger

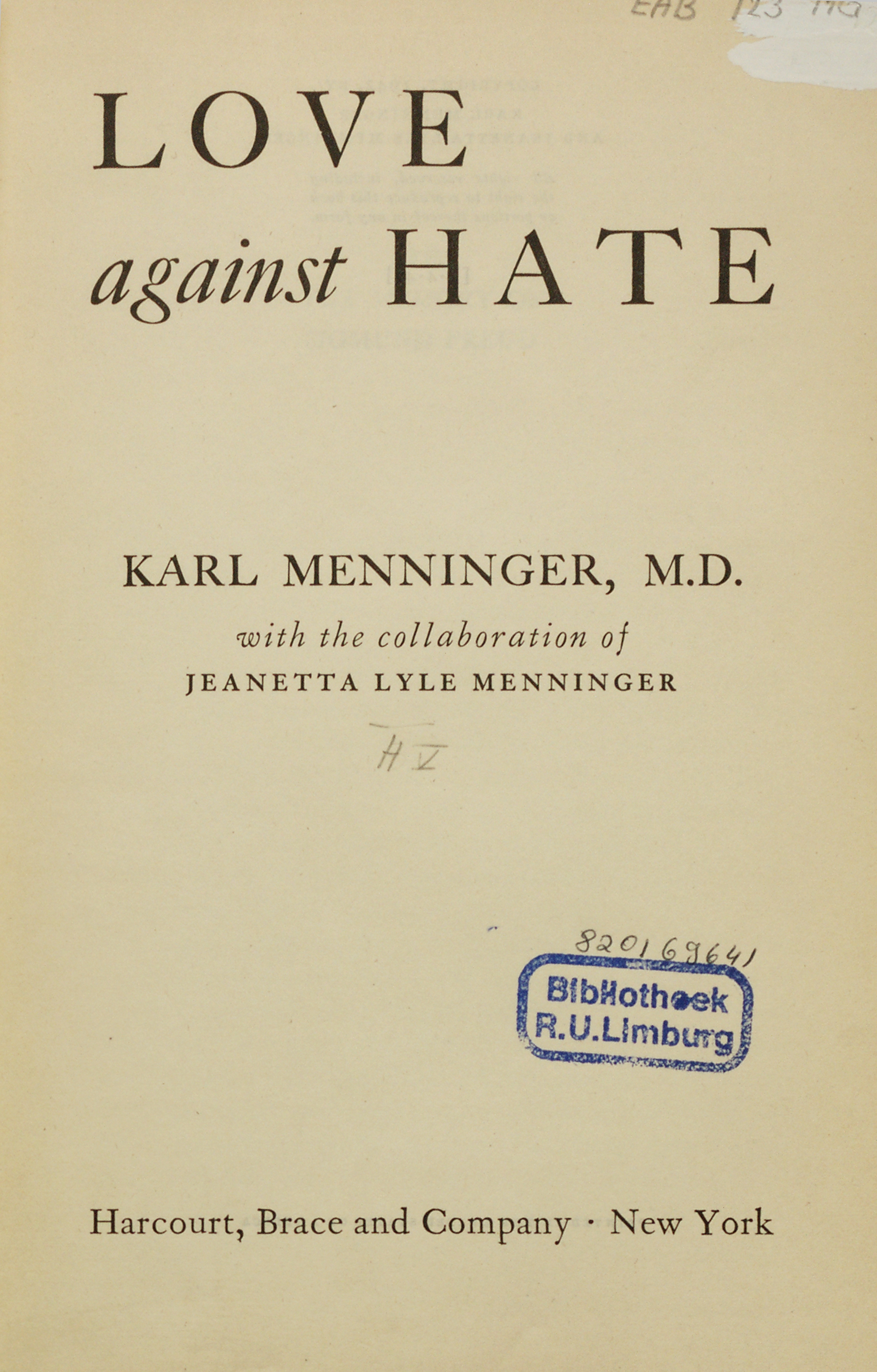
- Title page
- Author: Karl Menninger, Jeanetta Lyle Menninger
- Language: English
- Genre: Non-fiction
- Publisher: Harcourt, Brace and Company
- Publication date: 1942
- Publication place: United States

Love Against Hate is a book written in 1942 by the American psychiatrist Karl Menninger, in which he outlines a theoretical approach to understanding human instincts. His examination of the relationship between the instincts of love and hate incorporates prior psychological theory, in which Menninger utilizes to argue that cultivation of positive self-regard is integral to overcoming self-destructive tendencies. In doing so, the novel concludes that this achievement will result in human happiness.

The book is structured into ten chapters: early chapters focus on Menninger's framework for psychodynamic theory of suicide - developed in previous works, chapters that then extend upon his concept of instinctual forces as he attempts to reconcile the role of societal restraints on instinctual needs, chapters that address how Menninger sees the contribution of cumulative frustrations on repressive and aggressive human behaviour, and finally, chapters that propose that this built up of tentions could be broken by means of work, play, faith, hope, and love.

Love against Hate is written "to the memory of Sigmund Freud". Menninger used many of Freud's theories as a basis for his own work.

== Content ==
The nature of human is determined by two contradicting instincts, namely the instinct of destructiveness (= hate) as well as the instinct of life (= love). Looking at a society bestowed with war, in which aggression and hate override the life instinct, raises the question by which means one can encourage love and transform the impulse to fight. Karl Menninger begins with an examination of the reasons why aggression dominates our society, revealing that the major contributors are the frustration of women, the depreciation of femininity, as well as the resulting frustration of a child. Women's frustration is rooted in a men-ruled society, which undermines the erotic instinct of a woman and consequently her sexual satisfaction. Furthermore, it is the passiveness of men that dissatisfies women the most. Frustrated by men and deprived from erotic satisfaction, women unconsciously repudiate their own femininity and built up passive aggressions towards men. However, if women then take on the role of a mother, the repressed aggressive impulses towards men have a negative impact on the development of the male child. This is supported by the fact that child's "pattern of loving and hating is still in the process of formation". Forbidding the child to follow his masculine instincts, which is a requirement for his ability to love, disturbs a healthy psychosexual development. Instead males develop a negative attitude towards women already at a young age which causes them to be incapable of loving at later age. Therefore, they represent a new source of frustration for other women, which results in a vicious cycle.

The first step in breaking this vicious cycle of transferring hate from one generation to the next requires the awareness of one's own repressed aggressions. Only by becoming aware of the full extent, one can sublimate the destructive energy with an erotic instinct into the construction of something fruitful. The key of success in the sublimation process is provided by means of work, play, faith, hope, and love. The most convenient way of transforming one's aggression is work. Even though the process of work is representing a fight in its nature, the aim of work is the construction of something fruitful. Therefore, work provides the possibility to make use of one's destructive instinct in order to create something of a positive value. Another way to achieve sublimation is provided by play. Although society mostly denies the usefulness of play, it offers the possibility of discharging aggressive energy in a pleasurable manner. An additional advantage of play is that it is a form of relieving aggressive energy, which does not have any consequences for reality. A further opportunity to encourage love is faith. Faith can be directed towards religion or science. Depending on the individual both methods can provide a protection against the dangers from the outside world, as well as the dangers resulting from one's own hostility. Lastly, one should include hope as the basis for a better world. Realizing one's hopes of a better world can only be achieved by providing the next generation with the right values. Therefore, education has the responsibility to put more emphasis on the nature of one's emotions and how to deal with them. Finally, it is love that has the power to neutralize one's impulse to fight. The "progress of civilization has been made at the cost of the erotic life of mankind", but there is hope. A society can change and one should use the intelligence and the means provided by science to implement love as the most important value and consequently make the world a peaceful place.

== Critical reception ==
Love against Hate received critical acclaim. Critics mostly praised the book for its comprehensive and provocative manner of discussing the war of our instinctual forces and its consequences for the human kind. The British Journal of Psychiatry calls it an "interesting and provocative work”. The American Journal of Physical Medicine and Rehabilitation compliments Menninger's piece of work as an “extremely well written stimulating and illuminating discussion of psychological and psychoanalytic areas of study and experience”. Furthermore, the journal appreciates the psychiatrist's practical suggestions for therapy as “it will leave the therapist with a much more comprehensive understanding of love and hate in human nature and the bearing of these powerful sources upon the problems of therapy”. Lastly, the Journal of the American Medical Association emphasized in its review the importance of Menninger's book for society in stating that “such wisdom is needed today more than ever before, for an explosive individual or national outburst of temper of a series of badly mixed signals might blow us all away”.

== Context ==
Karl Menninger's piece of work was published in 1942, a time during which the world was "set on fire". Love against Hate was first brought out in the United States of America, which played a major role in the Second World War since the 1941 attack on Pearl Harbor. In his book, Menninger describes the world's state of war as a “disease, a world sickness, for which we know no ready cure”. However, it was not only the state of war itself for which no "cure" was known at that time, but also the mental health problems of its victims. The aftermath of World War I revealed that the experiences during that combat had a traumatic influence on the mental health of the soldiers. They suffered from the so-called "combat neurosis", a term which would nowadays meet the criteria for a diagnosis of post-traumatic stress disorder. In order to avoid this scenario of the First World War, psychologists developed psychometric tests, designed to screen out subjects who were evaluated as too weak or unstable for war conditions. Despite all the effort put in preventive processes, the attempt to avoid war neurosis during the Second World War failed with over a million soldiers being affected. It was only then that the military began to encourage the treatment for psychiatric illness. William Menninger, brother of Karl Menninger, became chief psychiatrist of the armed forces with the aim of providing support and treatment for the soldiers suffering from mental illnesses caused by the circumstances of war. Overall, the mental health crisis of the Second World War in the United States "drew national attention to the pressing need for psychiatric services in the United States, and made clear a previously overlooked concept: mental illness was not necessarily innate". The understanding that every person could develop mental health issues under certain circumstances resulted in a transformation of the perception of psychology as a field, as well as its treatment possibilities.
