= Ruth Faison Shaw =

American painter

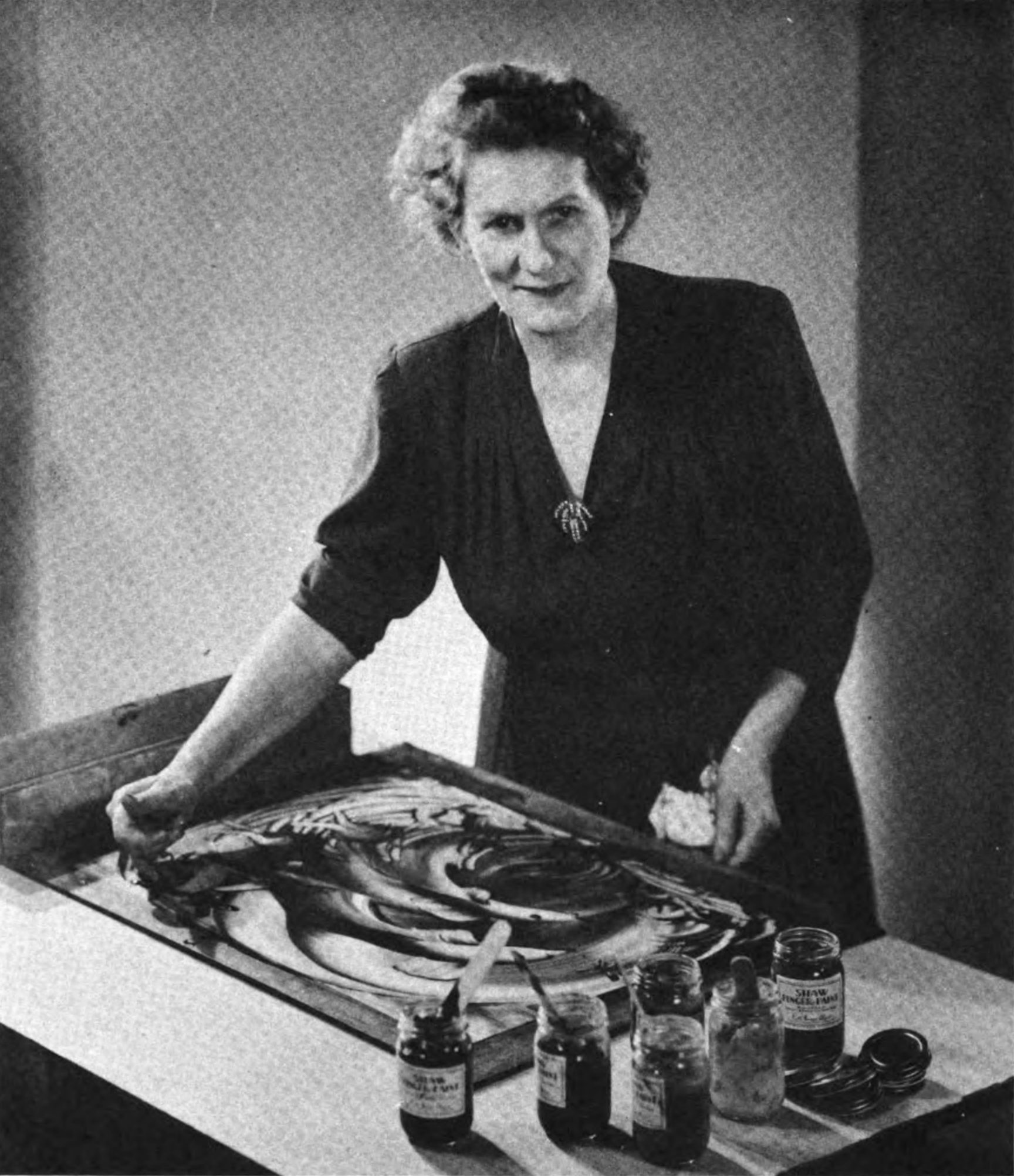
- Born: October 15, 1889; Kenansville, North Carolina
- Died: December 8, 1969 (aged 80); Fayetteville, North Carolina
- Education: James Sprunt Institute
- Known for: developing the art of finger painting and as a pioneer in progressive education.
- Notable work: Finger Painting: A Perfect Medium for Self-Expression (1934)

Signature
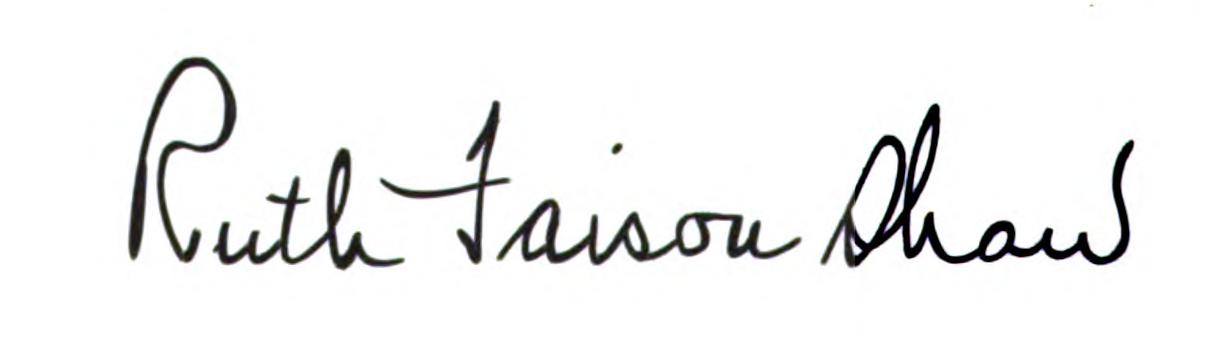

Ruth Faison Shaw (1889–1969) was an American artist, educator who is credited with introducing finger painting into the US as an art education medium. She developed her techniques while working in Rome, Italy, patenting a safe non-toxic paint in 1931.

== Early life ==
Shaw was born in Kenansville, North Carolina, on October 15, 1889. Her father was a Presbyterian minister and she had four brothers. She attended elementary school in Cabarrus County, North Carolina. She graduated from a Presbyterian girls school, the James Sprunt Institute, in 1906. She also attended the Peabody Conservatory in Baltimore. After graduation she gained some experience as (an untrained) school teacher in the Appalachian Mountains in Transylvania County, North Carolina.

In 1918 Shaw travelled to France and Italy with the Young Women's Christian Association (YWCA), before setting up a school in Rome.

== Finger painting ==
Shaw is credited with developing the art of finger painting and later introducing it into the American education system. She later claimed she had been inspired when she saw a child smearing iodine onto a wall, realising children liked to 'smear'. This event took place in 1926, when Shaw had already founded an experimental school, the Shaw School, for English-speaking children. Shaw developed the techniques and materials required for finger painting. In 1931 she patented a gelatinous paint medium that would be safe for children.

Shaw returned to the US in 1932. She took a job in the progressive Dalton School in New York City, where she introduced finger painting to the curriculum. An exhibition of finger painting art took place in Manhattan in 1933. She published several books on finger painting.

== Later career ==
Shaw came to be seen as a pioneer in progressive education. She was invited to lecture about finger painting and organize exhibitions. She started a factory in New York to produce her paint. Finger painting workshops were started for adults. In 1942 she became a lecturer at Teachers College, Columbia University.

Shaw died in Fayetteville, North Carolina in 1969. A collection of her papers are held at the Southern Historical Collection at the University of North Carolina.

== Selected works ==
- Shaw, Ruth Faison (1934). Finger Painting: A Perfect Medium for Self-Expression. Boston: Little, Brown, and Company. OCLC 1741952.
- Shaw, Ruth Faison (1947). Finger-Painting and How I Do It. New York: Leland-Brent Pub. Co. OCLC 1438717 – via HathiTrust.
