= Henry Ezriel =

Henry Ezriel (c1910-1985) was a Kleinian analyst who pioneered group analysis at the Tavistock Clinic.

He is best known as the originator of one of the Malan triangles.

== Training and contributions ==
Having taken a medical degree from Vienna, Ezriel emigrated to England, to work post-war alongside W. R. Bion as consultant psychiatrist to the Tavistock. There he developed his method of psychoanalytic group work, expounded in a series of articles in the fifties, and through his personal teaching thereafter. His non-directive approached centred on group tensions expressed in the here and now, and on transferences between members, and between members and the group.

Ezriel influentially proposed using what he called a “three part interpretation”, including the three key areas of adaptation, desire and anxiety. He highlighted the patient's required or conformist relationship to the group, which was seen as a defence against the wished-for relationship, a defence in turn driven by fear of an imagined catastrophic relationship. His associate David Malan would simplify Ezriel's formulations into his so-called 'triangle of conflict'.

Criticisms of Ezriel's approach included the way his minimalist interventions tended to promote an image of the omniscient therapist, as well as a feeling that individual patients were being neglected by comparison with the group as a whole.

== Selected writings ==
Ezriel, H. 'A Psycho-Analytic Approach to Group Treatment' British Journal of Medical Psychology, 23 (1950)

Ezriel, H. 'Notes on psychoanalytic Group therapy: II. Interpretation' Research Psychiatry, 15 (1952)

== See also ==
- Group therapy
- J. D. Sutherland
- S. H. Foulkes
- Vamik Volkan
