= Riley Gardner =

American psychologist

Riley W. Gardner
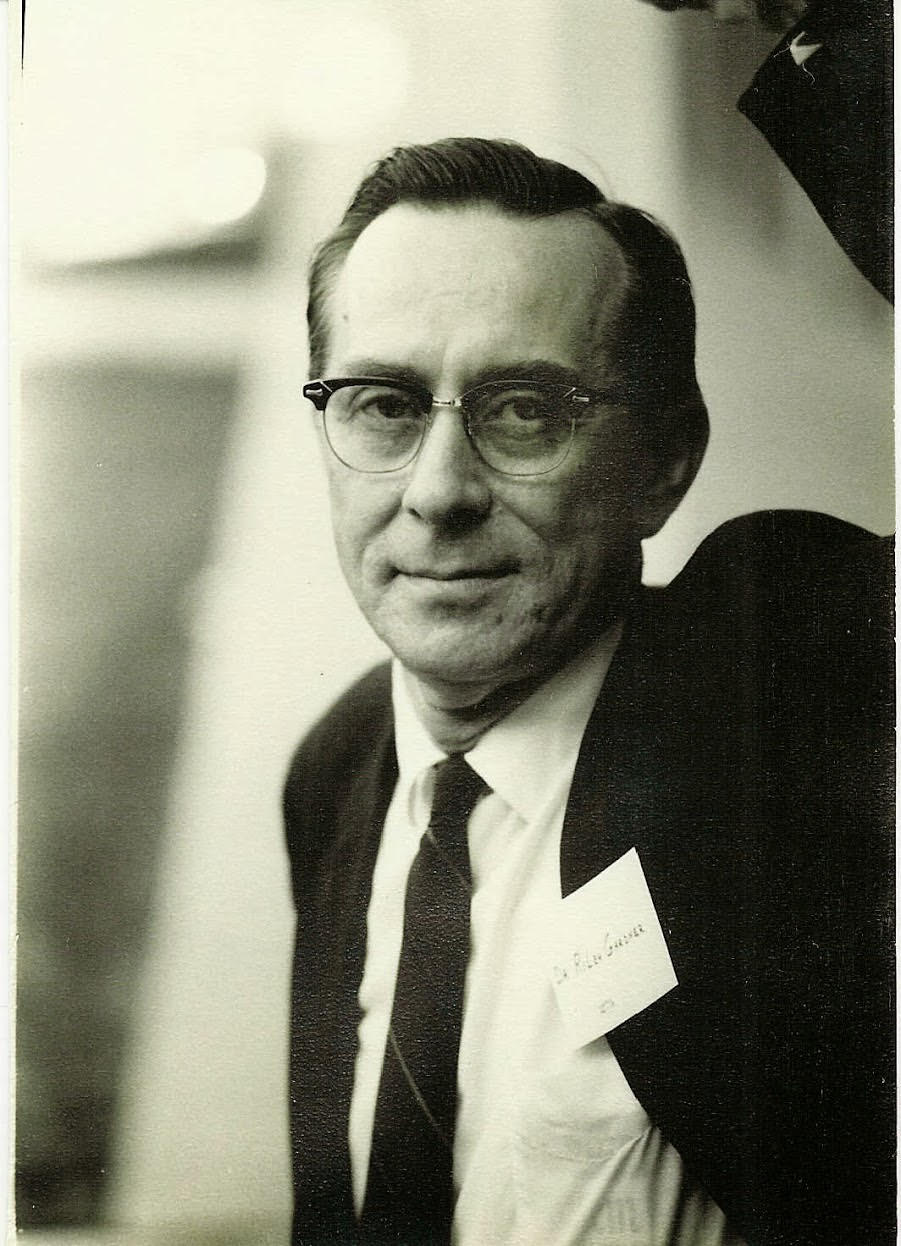
- Riley W. Gardner
- Born: October 31, 1921; Ree Heights, South Dakota, United States
- Died: October 23, 2007 (aged 85); Topeka, Kansas, United States
- Occupation: Psychologist
- Spouse: Ruth Janssen
- Children: Mark Gardner; Helen Gardner Crow
- Parent(s): Hugh Gardner; Ruth Speicher Gardner
- Relatives: Wayne Gardner (brother); Katherine Gardner-McElwain(sister)

Dr. Riley W. Gardner (October 31, 1921 – October 23, 2007) was an American psychologist who published works on individual differences and cognition.

== Early life and education ==
Gardner was born in Ree Heights, South Dakota, and was the son of Hugh Gardner and Ruth Speicher Gardner. They were among the "town people" in the tiny farming community of Ree Heights, South Dakota. His father was at various times a store keeper, an insurance agent, postmaster and the co-op grain elevator manager, as well as school board president and church elder. His mother was the piano teacher and church organist for the community. In Ree Heights Riley lived very close to his uncle (Hugh's brother) Charles Whiting Gardner, a banker and South Dakota state Senator married to Mary Ruth Butler Gardner, and his cousins Chuck (later a speech writer for a United States Senator) and Barbara (later Barbara Gardner Burns, a music teacher and painter).

Riley Gardner was the second born of three children, after his sister Katherine who was four years his elder, and before his brother Wayne. He graduated first in his high school class (which numbered ten students total) from Ree Heights High School in Ree Heights, South Dakota. In 1945 he graduated summa cum laude with a bachelor's in English from Yankton College in Yankton, South Dakota.

After college, Gardner entered the military and became a staff sergeant in the U.S. Army Medical Corps, serving from 1946 until 1948. It was during this military service that he was introduced to psychiatric care. Following the military, he earned his Ph.D. in psychology from the University of Kansas in 1952, summa cum laude, a member of Phi Beta Kappa. He married Ruth Janssen on August 27, 1950, in Yankton, South Dakota.

== Career ==
Gardner spent most of his professional career (from 1951 to 1971) as a research psychologist at the Menninger Foundation in Topeka, Kansas. During this time he was the Director of the research group engaged in studying cognition control principles. He had two major grants from the National Institutes of Health and invitations to teach in seminars and at universities around the U.S. and abroad, and he published numerous papers on individual differences and cognition.

Gardner's work was part of what was called the "new look in perception." In the late 1950s an attempt was being made in academic psychology and psychoanalysis to correlate and study the interaction of cognition, needs, and personality. A number of the leaders of this "new look" were psychoanalytically trained psychologists working at the Menninger Clinic. Gardner was part of this well known group that also included George Klein, Philip Holzman, and Robert Holt. Gardner, with his research on cognitive controls, was part of this group that insisted that cognition played an essential role in the formation and functioning of personality rather than being a mental function separate from personality. This idea is an implicit foundation for modern day psychoanalytic concepts such as self and object representations, mentalization, and a structural perspective on the workings of the mind. The concept of cognitive control explains Gardner and Klein's finding that individuals use particular cognitive or ego strategies to notice, register, compare, process, integrate or avoid information from the environment. Furthermore, individuals differ in the types of strategies they use. The entire focus on self-regulation within the field of psychoanalysis is based on this assumption.

As part of his research, he performed an in-depth study of 105 pairs of twins in the vicinity of Topeka, Kansas, and received an honorary invitation to membership in Topeka's Mothers of Twins Club. In late 1970 he suffered a temporary mental breakdown which marked the end of his professional career.

== Family and later life ==
Gardner and his wife Ruth had two children together, Helen and Mark. Later in life he became the full-time caretaker for his granddaughter and continued his personal education in music and the sciences. He died on October 23, 2007, and is interred Topeka, Kansas.

== Publications ==
1951

- Impulsivity as indicated by Rorschach test factors. J. Consulting Psychol., 15, No. 6.
- With Klein, G. S., & Schlesinger, H. J. Perceptual attitudes toward instability: prediction from apparent movement responses to other tasks involving resolution of unstable fields (abstract). Amer. Psychol., 6, 332.

1953

- Cognitive styles in categorizing behavior. J. Pers., 22, 214–33.

1957

- Field dependence as a determinant of susceptibility to certain illusions (abstract). Amer. Psychol., 12, 397.

1958

- With Jackson, D. N., & Messick, S. J. Personality organization in cognitive attitudes and intellectual abilities (abstract). Amer. Psychol., 13, 336.

1959

- Cognitive control principles and perceptual behavior. Bull. Menninger Clin., 23, 241–48.
- With Holzman, P. S., Klein, G. S., Linton, Harriet B., & Spence, D. P. Cognitive control: a study of individual consistencies in cognitive behavior. Psychol. Issues, 1, No. 4.
- With Holzman, P. S., Leveling and repression J. Abnorm. soc. Psychol., 59, No. 2.

1960

- Cognitive controls in adaptation: a strategy for current research. Paper presented at Conference on Personality Measurement, [Educational Testing Service], Princeton, New Jersey.
- With Jackson, D. N., & Messick, S. J. Personality organization in cognitive controls and intellectual abilities. Psychol. Issues, 1960, 2, No. 4 (Whole No. 8).
- With Lohrenz, L. J. Leveling-sharpening and serial reproduction of a story. Bull. Menninger Clin., 24, 295–304.
- With Long, R. I. Errors of the standard and illusion effects with the inverted-T. Percept. mot. Skills, 10, 47–54.
- With Long, R. I. Errors of the standard and illusion effects with L-shaped figures. Percept. mot. Skills, 10, 107–9.
- With Long, R. I. Leveling-sharpening and serial learning. Percept. mot. Skills, 10, 179–85.
- With Long, R. I. Cognitive controls as determinants of learning and remembering. Psychologia, 3, 165–71.
- With Long, R. I. The stability of cognitive controls. J. Abnorm. soc. Psychol., 61, 485–87.
- With Long, R. I. Cognitive controls in learning and recall. Paper presented at annual meeting of Southwestern Psychological Association, Galveston, Texas.

1961

- Cognitive controls of attention deployment as determinants of visual illusions. J. Abnorm. Soc. Psychol., 62, 120–29.
- Individual differences in figural after-effects and response to reversible figures. Br. J. Psychol., 52, 269–72.
- Personality organization and the nature of consciousness. Paper presented at Conference on Problems of Consciousness and Perception, Wayne State University, Detroit, Mich.
- With Lohrenz, L. J. Attention and assimilation. Amer. J. Psychol., 74, 607–611.
- With Long, R. I. Selective attention and the Mueller-Lyer illusion. Psychol. Rec., 11, 317–20.
- With Long, R. I. Field-articulation in recall. Psychol. Rec., 11, 305–10.

1962

- Cognitive controls in adaptation: research and measurement. In S. Messick & J. Ross (eds.), Measurement in personality and cognition. New York: Wiley, pp. 183–98.
- With Klein, G. S. & Schlesinger, H. J. Tolerance for unrealistic experiences: a study of the generality of a cognitive control. Br. J. Psychol., 53, 41–55.
- With Long, R. I. Control, defence, and centration effect: a study of scanning behaviour. Br. J. Psychol., 53, 129–40.
- With Long, R. I. Cognitive controls of attention and inhibition: a study of individual consistencies. Br. J. Psychol., 53, 381–88.
- With Schoen, R. A. Differentiation and abstraction in concept formation. Psychol. Monogr., 76, No. 41 (Whole No. 560).

1964

- The development of cognitive structures. In Constance Scheerer (ed.), Cognition: theory, research, promise. New York: Harper and Row, pp. 147–71.
- Cognitive control and person perception. Paper read at the annual meeting of the American Psychological Association, Los Angeles, Calif., September 5.
- The Menninger Foundation study of twins and their parents. Paper read at the annual meeting of the American Psychological Association, Los Angeles, Calif., September 9.

1965

- Genetics and personality theory. In S. G. Vandenberg (ed.), Methods and goals in human behavior genetics. New York: Academic Press, pp. 223–29.

1966

- A Psychologist Looks at Montessori. The Elementary School Journal, 67, No. 2, 72–83.
- The needs of teachers for specialized information on the development of cognitive structures. In The teacher of brain injured children: a discussion of the bases for competency, W. M. Cruikshank (ed.) New York: Syracuse University, pp. 137–52

1967

- Organismic equilibration and the energy-structure duality in psychoanalytic theory: an attempt at theoretical refinement. J. Amer. psychoanalyt. Assn.
- With Lohrenz, L. J., The Mayman form-level scoring method: scorer reliability and correlates of form level. Journal of Projective Techniques and Personality Assessment, 31, 39–43.

1968

- With Moriarty, Alice. Personality development at preadolescence: explorations of structure formation. Seattle: University of Washington Press.
