= Ree Heights, South Dakota =

- Town
- Location in Hand County and the state of South Dakota
- Coordinates: 44°30′57″N 99°12′02″W
- Country: United States
- State: South Dakota
- County: Hand
- Founded: 1882

Area
  - Total: 0.30 sq mi (0.77 km^{2})
  - Land: 0.30 sq mi (0.77 km^{2})
  - Water: 0 sq mi (0.00 km^{2})
- Elevation: 1,742 ft (531 m)

Population (2020)
  - Total: 59
  - Density: 199.1/sq mi (76.89/km^{2})
- Time zone: UTC-6 (Central (CST))
  - Summer (DST): UTC-5 (CDT)
- ZIP code: 57371
- Area code: 605
- FIPS code: 46-53940
- GNIS feature ID: 1267548

Ree Heights is a town in western Hand County, South Dakota, United States. As of the 2020 census, Ree Heights had a population of 59.

== History ==
Ree Heights was laid out in 1882. The town was named after the Arikara (Ree) Indians. A post office in Ree Heights has been in operation since 1882.

== Geography ==
According to the United States Census Bureau, the town has a total area of 0.30 square miles (0.78 km^{2}), all land.

== Demographics ==
Historical population
Census	Pop.	Note	%±
1930	339		—
1940	258		−23.9%
1950	254		−1.6%
1960	188		−26.0%
1970	183		−2.7%
1980	88		−51.9%
1990	91		3.4%
2000	85		−6.6%
2010	62		−27.1%
2020	59		−4.8%
U.S. Decennial Census

=== 2010 census ===
As of the census of 2010, there were 62 people, 28 households, and 18 families residing in the town. The population density was 206.7 inhabitants per square mile (79.8/km^{2}). There were 52 housing units at an average density of 173.3 per square mile (66.9/km^{2}). The racial makeup of the town was 100.0% White.

There were 28 households, of which 17.9% had children under the age of 18 living with them, 57.1% were married couples living together, 3.6% had a female householder with no husband present, 3.6% had a male householder with no wife present, and 35.7% were non-families. 25.0% of all households were made up of individuals, and 10.7% had someone living alone who was 65 years of age or older. The average household size was 2.21 and the average family size was 2.72.

The median age in the town was 54 years. 14.5% of residents were under the age of 18; 9.7% were between the ages of 18 and 24; 12.9% were from 25 to 44; 38.7% were from 45 to 64; and 24.2% were 65 years of age or older. The gender makeup of the town was 51.6% male and 48.4% female.

=== 2000 census ===
As of the census of 2000, there were 85 people, 36 households, and 24 families residing in the town. The population density was 291.7 inhabitants per square mile (112.6/km^{2}). There were 46 housing units at an average density of 157.9 per square mile (61.0/km^{2}). The racial makeup of the town was 97.65% White, 1.18% Asian, and 1.18% from two or more races.

There were 36 households, out of which 30.6% had children under the age of 18 living with them, 55.6% were married couples living together, 5.6% had a female householder with no husband present, and 33.3% were non-families. 22.2% of all households were made up of individuals, and 5.6% had someone living alone who was 65 years of age or older. The average household size was 2.36 and the average family size was 2.79.

In the town, the population was spread out, with 23.5% under the age of 18, 5.9% from 18 to 24, 22.4% from 25 to 44, 29.4% from 45 to 64, and 18.8% who were 65 years of age or older. The median age was 42 years. For every 100 females, there were 112.5 males. For every 100 females age 18 and over, there were 116.7 males.

The median income for a household in the town was $27,083, and the median income for a family was $27,083. Males had a median income of $23,750 versus $20,000 for females. The per capita income for the town was $10,276. There were 4.8% of families and 3.8% of the population living below the poverty line, including no under eighteens and 25.0% of those over 64.

== Notable person ==
- Riley Gardner, a noted American psychologist; born in Ree Heights.

== See also ==
- List of towns in South Dakota
