= Habib Davanloo =

Canadian psychoanalyst

Habib Davanloo (October 10, 1927 – November 2023) was a Canadian psychoanalyst and psychiatric researcher who worked in Montreal, Quebec, and developed intensive short-term dynamic psychotherapy (ISTDP). He was Professor of Psychiatry at McGill University and founding editor of the International Journal of Intensive Short-term Dynamic Psychotherapy.

== Background ==
Habib Davanloo was a Canadian psychiatric researcher of Iranian origin. Davanloo was a psychiatric resident under Erich Lindemann, a German psychiatrist who specialized in the treatment of bereaved and traumatized patients. On April 18, 2024, it was announced that Davanloo had died at the age of 96.

== Career ==
Davanloo was the director of the Institute for Teaching and Research in Short-term and Dynamic Psychotherapy at the Montreal General Hospital. In 1962 he began to develop his technique for treating patients on a short-term basis, creating and studying videotapes of sessions. He later gave seminars about his research and made the videotapes available.

Davanloo's methods, which according to some authors were based on resolving Oedipal conflicts, were widely discussed in psychiatric literature and successfully used by many other therapists.

== Publications ==
=== Books ===
- H. Davanloo (1980) "Basic principles and technique in Short-Term Dynamic Psychotherapy", Spectrum, NY, 1978 H. Davanloo: Short-Term Dynamic Psychotherapy, J. Aronson, NY
- H. Davanloo (1990) "Unlocking the Unconscious; Selected papers of Habib Davanloo", MD, Wiley Sons, Chichester, England
- H. Davanloo (2001) "Intensive Short-Term Dynamic Psychotherapy: Selected papers of Habib Davanloo", John Wiley and Sons, Chichester, England. ISBN 0471497045

=== Book chapters ===
- H. Davanloo (1984) "Short-Term Dynamic Psychotherapy", In: Kaplan H., and Sadock B. (eds), "Comprehensive Textbook of Psychiatry", 4th edn., Chapter 29.11, Baltimore, MD, Williams & Wilkins
- H. Davanloo (2005). "Intensive Short-Term Dynamic Psychotherapy" In: Kaplan H., and Sadock B. (eds), Comprehensive Textbook of Psychiatry, 8th ed, Vol 2, Chapter 30.9, 2628-2652, Lippincott Williams & Wilkins, Philadelphia

=== Papers ===
- H. Davanloo (1995) "Intensive Short-Term Dynamic Psychotherapy: Spectrum of Psychoneurotic Disorders", International Journal of Intensive Short-Term Dynamic Psychotherapy, Vol. 10, 3-4, 121-155,
- H. Davanloo (1995) "Intensive Short-Term Dynamic Psychotherapy: Technique of Partial and major Unlocking of the Unconscious with a Highly Resistant Patient - Part I. Partial Unlocking of the Unconscious", International Journal of Intensive Short-Term Dynamic Psychotherapy, Vol. 10, 3-4, 157-181,
- H. Davanloo (1995) "Intensive Short-Term Dynamic Psychotherapy: Major Unlocking of the Unconscious - Part II. The Course of the Trial Therapy after Partial Unlocking", International Journal of Intensive Short-Term Dynamic Psychotherapy, Vol. 10, 3-4, 183-230,
- H. Davanloo (1996) "Management of Tactical Defenses in Intensive Short-Term Dynamic Psychotherapy, Part I: Overview, Tactical Defenses of Cover Words and Indirect Speech", International Journal of Intensive Short-Term Dynamic Psychotherapy, Vol. 11, 3, 129-152,
- H. Davanloo (1996) "Management of Tactical Defenses in Intensive Short-Term Dynamic Psychotherapy, Part II: Spectrum of Tactical Defenses", in: International Journal of Intensive Short-Term Dynamic Psychotherapy, Vol. 11, 3, 153-199,
- H. Davanloo (2001) "Intensive Short-Term Dynamic Psychotherapy: Extended Major Direct Access to the Unconscious", European Psychotherapy, Vol. 2, 1, 25-70, Cip-Medien, Muenchen
