= Malan triangles =

Psychotherapeutic theory

Malan's triangles – comprising the triangle of conflict and the triangle of persons – were developed in 1979 by the psychotherapist David Malan as a way of illuminating the phenomenon of transference in psychotherapy, both brief and extended.

Their application has continued to prove fruitful into the twenty-first century. This method also became a rubric in which a therapist can reflect upon what they are doing or where they "are" in relational space at any given moment.

== Origins ==
As Malan himself acknowledged, he drew the concept of his triangles from previous analytic writings (albeit combining in the process very different aspects of the tradition). The American Freudian Karl Menninger - building on Franz Alexander's concept of the totalizing transference interpretation, which linked past experience, life context and the analytic setting – set out what he called the triangle of insight, involving the three poles of analyst, past significant others, and present significant others. This triangle Malan renamed as the triangle of persons.

Malan derived his second triangle from his Tavistock Clinic colleague, the Kleinian group therapist Henry Ezriel. Ezriel had used a three-tiered interpretation for identifying members' attitudes to the group – the required (surface) attitude, the wished-for attitude, and the catastrophic attitude (a traumatic expectation, fear of which helped turn the wished-for attitude into the required or conformist attitude). Simplified, Ezriel's three tiers became Malan's triangle of conflict, comprising defence, impulse and anxiety.

== Usage ==
Malan's achievement was to place these very differently-sourced triangles in juxtaposition, the one to illuminate intra-psychic processes, the other the inter-personal. Malan himself claimed that “between them they can be used to represent almost every intervention that a therapist makes...skill consists in knowing which part of which triangle to include at any given moment”.

Both triangles should be imagined as inverted, standing on their apex – which in the one consisted of the unconscious impulse, in the other of early childhood links to the parents. Much interpretation using the triangles concerns illuminating defences and current relationships, with reference to the unconscious feelings and personal transferences underlying them. The concept is deceptively simple but it is effective in approaching clinical situations no matter how convoluted or sophisticated they are.

The Malan triangles are considered main components of Experiential Short-Term Dynamic Psychotherapy (E-STDP), along with mirroring function and dynamic activities. They are also employed as vade mecum in introducing the principles and practice of dynamic therapy to trainee therapists or experienced professionals who need to "unlearn" the tendency to help, advise, prescribe, and begin to acquire a new set of skills.

Malan's triangles are used in several contemporary short-term psychodynamic psychotherapy approaches including Affect Phobia Therapy and Regulation-Focused Psychotherapy for Children (RFP-C).

== Criticism ==
Critics have warned of the danger of the mechanical, overly-intellectual application of Malan's triangles in actual practice.

== See also ==
- Karpman drama triangle
- Michael Balint
- Psychodynamic psychotherapy
