= Carl Menninger =

American director and playwright

Carl Menninger is an American director and playwright. He is currently an assistant professor of theatre at American University in Washington, DC. He holds a master's degree from Emerson College and a bachelor's from Northwestern University.

Menninger is the Associate Artistic Director of Windy City Playhouse in Chicago. Menninger co-authored Minding the Edge: Strategies for a Successful, Fulfilling Career as an Actor with Lori Hammel. At Windy City Playhouse he co-created the long-running production of "Southern Gothic", an award-winning immersive play, and is one of the two playwrights of "Sons of Hollywood" (to be presented at the Playhouse in the fall of 2020. The Ganymede Fall Arts Festival presented a reading of his play Dysfunction Spelled Backward . . . is family. Keegan Theatre, in Washington, DC, presented a staged reading of his play Everything but You: A Modern Romance. He directed a staged reading of the Adam Gwon and Julia Jordan musical, Bernice Bobs Her Hair at American University.

He has directed professionally in Chicago, Boston and Washington, DC. Productions include "This", "The Boys in the Band" "Pinkalicous

Menninger taught at the Berklee College of Music as well as professional training programs in Washington and Chicago. While at American University, Menninger directed productions of Into the Woods, Nine, Romeo and Juliet, Hay Fever, Do I Hear a Waltz?, The Hot L Baltimore, Shared Space, Orpheus Descending and Happy.Go.Lucky, Bare, Carrie: the musical and Dracula
