= Psychodynamic psychotherapy =

Form of psychoanalysis and/or depth psychology

- MeSH: D064889

Psychodynamic psychotherapy (or psychodynamic therapy) and psychoanalytic psychotherapy (or psychoanalytic therapy) are two categories of psychological therapies. Their main purpose is to reveal the unconscious content of a patient's psyche in an effort to alleviate psychic tension, which is inner conflict within the mind that was created in a situation of extreme stress or emotional hardship, often in the state of distress. The terms "psychoanalytic psychotherapy" and "psychodynamic psychotherapy" are often used interchangeably, but a distinction can be made in practice: although psychodynamic psychotherapy largely relies on psychoanalytic theory, it employs substantially shorter treatment periods than traditional psychoanalytical therapies, including psychoanalysis. Studies on the specific practice of psychodynamic psychotherapy suggest that it is evidence-based. Long-term psychoanalytic psychotherapy may offer small but statistically significant benefits over other therapies for complex mental disorders, though findings are limited by study differences and methodology.

Psychodynamic psychotherapy relies more on the interpersonal relationship between the patient and the therapist than other forms of depth psychology. They must have a strong relationship built heavily on trust. In terms of approach, this form of therapy uses psychoanalysis in a less intensive style of working, usually once or twice per week, often at the same frequency as many other therapies. The techniques draw on the theories of Sigmund Freud, Melanie Klein, and the object relations theory proponents, including Donald Winnicott, Harry Guntrip, and Wilfred Bion. Some psychodynamic therapists also draw on the work of Carl Jung, Jacques Lacan, and Robert Langs. Psychodynamic therapy has been used in individual psychotherapy, group psychotherapy, family therapy, and to understand and work with institutional and organizational contexts. In psychiatry, it is sometimes used for adjustment disorders and post-traumatic stress disorder (PTSD), but more often for personality disorders.

== History ==
The principles of psychodynamics were introduced in the 1874 publication Lectures on Physiology by German physician and physiologist Ernst Wilhelm von Brücke. Von Brücke, taking a cue from thermodynamics, suggested all living organisms are energy systems, governed by the principle of conservation of energy. During the same year, von Brücke was a supervisor to first-year medical student Sigmund Freud at the University of Vienna. Freud later adopted this new construct of "dynamic" physiology to aid in his own conceptualization of the human psyche. Later, both the concept and application of psychodynamics were further developed by the likes of Carl Jung, Alfred Adler, Otto Rank, and Melanie Klein. Psychodynamic therapy has evolved from psychoanalytic theory, with some later modifications in the therapeutic practice experienced since the mid-20th century.

== Approaches ==
Most psychodynamic approaches are centered on the concept that some degree of maladaptive functioning is in play and that this maladaptation is, at least in part, an outgrowth of the unconscious mind. The presumed maladaptation develops early in life and eventually causes daily difficulties. Psychodynamic therapies focus on revealing and resolving these unconscious conflicts driving symptoms. The therapist takes a more interpretive and much less directive role relative to cognitive-behavioral therapeutic roles.

Major techniques used by psychodynamic therapists include:

- Free association: The patient is encouraged to communicate their true feelings and thoughts to the therapist. This is done with the patient knowing it is a safe space and without judgment or consequences. These thoughts and/or responses could be irrelevant, illogical, or embarrassing to the patient. This is to help access unconscious information, memories, or impulses that the patient might otherwise have been unable to bring to the surface. After being brought to consciousness, they can be interpreted.
- Dream interpretation: (also known as dream analysis) The patient records their dreams and communicates or relays them to the therapist, sometimes aided by free association. Then, the content is analyzed or interpreted for hidden meanings, underlying motivations, and other portrayals.
- Recognizing resistance: This could be in many forms, with slight variations depending on the type of resistance. The patients' withholding or withholding information for their betterment and interpretation. Often, the patient could be using this as a defense. This could be categorized into three different types of resistance.

The first type of resistance is conscious resistance, in which the patient deliberately refrains from communicating the information needed due to distrust in the system, the therapist, shame, or rejection of the interpreter.

The second, repression resistance, or ego resistance, is used by the patient to keep unacceptable thoughts, feelings, actions, and/or impulses in the unconscious. This could be done by the patient blocking thoughts and communications during free associations and not remembering events.

The third, id resistance, is unlike the other two because it arises from the unconscious and is driven by id impulses. It resists change or treatment to further repeat the trauma in different situations, known as repetition compulsion. Additionally, there may be transference of views, feelings, and/or wishes of the patient onto the analyst, often the therapist, that were initially directed towards other impactful individuals in the patient's life. This is often the case in early childhood, such as parents, siblings, or other important people. Addressing these projected views is hoped to help the patient reexperience, address, and analyze the effects and resolve the current distress they may be causing. As in some psychoanalytic approaches, the therapeutic relationship is seen as a key means to understanding and working through the relational difficulties which the patient has suffered in life.

== Core principles and characteristics ==
Although psychodynamic psychotherapy can take many forms, commonalities include:

- An emphasis on the centrality of intrapsychic and unconscious conflicts and their relation to development;
- Identifying defenses as developing in internal psychic structures to avoid unpleasant consequences of conflict;
- A belief that psychopathology develops mainly from early childhood experiences;
- A view that internal representations of experiences are organized around interpersonal relations;
- A conviction that life issues and dynamics will re-emerge in the context of the /patient-therapist relationship as transference and counter-transference;
- Use of free association as a major method for exploration of internal conflicts and problems;
- Focusing on interpretations of transference, defense mechanisms, and current symptoms and the working through of these present problems;
- Trust in insight is critically important for success in therapy.

== Efficacy ==
Psychodynamic psychotherapy is an evidence-based therapy. Meta-analyses have generally found psychoanalysis and psychodynamic therapy to be effective, Arguments for psychodynamic modalities have also been subject to criticisms. For example, in the setting of major depressive disorder, short-term psychodynamic psychotherapy (STPP) may not be as effective for symptom management as pharmacotherapy.

In a 2013 meta-analysis of 14 studies, psychoanalysis was shown to produce pre-/post-improvements in symptoms and personality in patients with complex mental disorders. However, the lack of control groups limited the strength of the evidence. An updated 2020 meta-analysis of long-term psychoanalytic psychotherapy (LTPP) for complex mental disorders found small but statistically significant benefits over other psychotherapies in most outcome domains, though results should be interpreted cautiously due to study heterogeneity and methodological limitations.

Meta-analyses indicate that LTPP is more effective than shorter therapies for complex mental disorders. A systematic review of LTPP in 2009 found an overall effect size of 0.33. Others have found effect sizes of 0.44–0.68.

Meta-analyses of STPP have found effect sizes ranging from 0.34 to 0.71 compared with no treatment and have been slightly better than other therapies in follow-up. Other reviews have found an effect size of 0.78–0.91 for Somatoform disorders compared to no treatment and 0.69 for treating depression. A 2012 meta-analysis published in the Harvard Review of Psychiatry of intensive short-term dynamic psychotherapy (ISTDP) found effect sizes ranging from 0.84 for interpersonal problems to 1.51 for depression. Overall, ISTDP had an effect size of 1.18 compared to no treatment.

In 2011, a study published in The American Journal of Psychiatry compared psychodynamic treatment with a non-dynamic competitor in 103 cases and found that six were superior, five were inferior, 28 showed no difference, and 63 were adequate. The study found that this could be used as a basis "to make psychodynamic psychotherapy an 'empirically validated' treatment." In 2017, a meta-analysis of randomized controlled trials found psychodynamic therapy to be as efficacious as other therapies, including cognitive behavioral therapy.

== Patient-therapist relationship ==
Because of the subjectivity of each patient's potential psychological ailments, there is rarely a clear-cut treatment approach. Most often, therapists vary general approaches in order to best fit a patient's specific needs. If a therapist does not understand the psychological ailments of their patient extremely well, then it is unlikely that they are able to decide upon a treatment structure that will help the patient. Therefore, the patient-therapist relationship must be extremely strong.

Therapists encourage their patients to be as open and honest as possible. Patients must trust their therapist if this is to happen. Because the effectiveness of treatment relies so heavily on the patient giving information to their therapist, the patient-therapist relationship is more vital to psychodynamic therapy than almost every other type of medical practice.

== See also ==
- Anna Freud
- Malan triangles
- Models of abnormality
- Psychodynamic Diagnostic Manual
