= Menninger Foundation =

American foundation

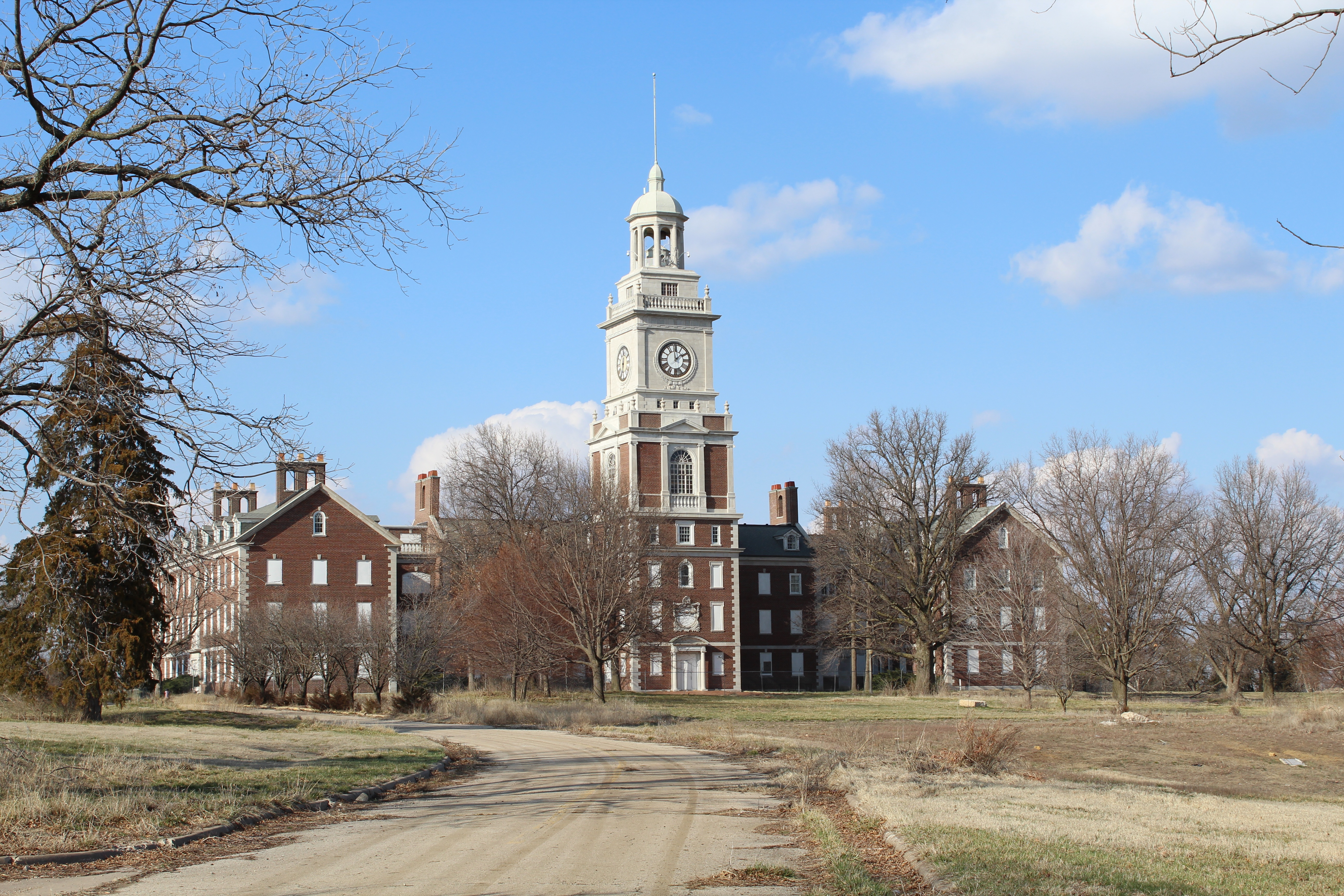
- The Menninger Clock Tower in Topeka, Kansas
- Formation: 1919
- Founder: Dr. Charles F. Menninger, Dr. Karl Menninger, Dr. William Menninger
- Type: Nonprofit psychiatric organization
- Purpose: Psychiatry, mental health treatment, education, and research
- Headquarters: Houston, Texas, United States (originally Topeka, Kansas)
- Location: United States
- Key people: Karl Menninger, William Menninger
- Subsidiaries: The Menninger Clinic
- Affiliations: Baylor College of Medicine, The Methodist Hospital
- Website: www.menningerclinic.org
- Remarks: Former campus in Topeka, Kansas; moved to Houston in 2003
- Formerly called: Menninger Clinic, Menninger Sanitarium, Menninger School of Psychiatry

The Menninger Foundation was founded in 1919 by the Menninger family in Topeka, Kansas. The Menninger Foundation, known locally as Menninger's, consists of a clinic, a sanatorium, and a school of psychiatry, all of which bear the Menninger name. Menninger's consisted of a campus at 5800 S.W. 6th Avenue in Topeka, Kansas which included a pool as well as the other aforementioned buildings. In 2003, the Menninger Clinic moved to Houston. The foundation was started in 1919 by Charles F. Menninger and his sons, Karl Menninger and William Menninger. It represented the first group psychiatry practice.

== History ==
The Menninger Clinic, also known as the C. F. Menninger Memorial Hospital, was founded in the 1920s in Topeka, Kansas. The Menninger Sanitarium was founded in 1925. The Menninger Clinic established the Southard School for children in 1926. The school fostered treatment programs for children and adolescents that were recognized worldwide. In the 1930s the Menningers expanded training programs for psychiatrists, psychologists, and other mental health professionals.

The Menninger Foundation was established in 1941. The Menninger School of Psychiatry was established in 1946. It quickly became the largest training center in the country, driven by the country's demand for psychiatrists to treat military veterans.

Menninger announced its affiliation with Baylor College of Medicine and The Methodist Hospital in December 2002. The concept was that Menninger would perform treatment while Baylor would oversee research and education.

=== Moves ===
The Menninger Clinic moved in June 2003 from Topeka, Kansas to Houston, Texas. The Menninger Clinic again moved to its new location at 12301 S. Main St., Houston, Texas, 77035 in May 2012.

=== Current facilities ===
As of May 2012, The Menninger Clinic offers: Adolescent Treatment Program, a Professionals Program, the Compass Program for Young Adults, the Comprehensive Psychiatric Assessment & Stabilization Program, an Assessments Service and the Hope Program for Adults.

== Revolution in psychiatric education ==
The Menninger School of Psychiatry and the local Veterans Administration Hospital represented the center of a psychiatric education revolution. The Clinic and the School became the hub for training professionals in the bio-psycho-social approach. This approach integrated the foundations of medical, psychodynamic, developmental, and family systems to focus on the overall health of patients. For patients, this way of treatment attended to their physical, emotional, and social needs.

Dr. Otto Fleischmann, head of the psychoanalytic institute from 1956 to 1963, was doing psychotherapy behind a one-way vision screen, in full view of all the students.

In 1960 Otto Kernberg joined the Clinic and later became its director until 1965.

=== Karl Menninger ===
Dr. Karl Menninger's first book, The Human Mind (1930), became a bestseller and familiarized the American public with human behavior. Many Americans also read his subsequent books, including The Vital Balance, Man Against Himself and Love Against Hate.

=== Will Menninger ===
Dr. Will Menninger made a major contribution to the field of psychiatry when he developed a system of hospital treatment known as milieu therapy. This approach involved a patient's total environment in treatment. Dr. Menninger served as Chief of the Army Medical Corps' Psychiatric Division during World War II. Under his leadership, the Army reduced losses in personnel due to psychological impairment. In 1945, the Army promoted Dr. Menninger to brigadier general. After the war, Dr. Menninger led a national revolution to reform state sanitariums. In 1948, Time magazine featured Dr. Menninger on its cover, lauding him as "psychiatry’s U.S. sales manager."

== See also ==
- Roy W. Menninger
- W. Walter Menninger
- Harriet Lerner
- Riley Gardner
- The New York Foundation
