= David H. Malan =

British psychotherapist

David Huntingford Malan (21 March 1922 – 14 October 2020) was a British psychoanalytic psychotherapy practitioner and researcher recognized for his contribution to the development of psychotherapy. He promoted scientific spirit of inquiry, openness, and simplicity within the field. He is also noted for his development of the Malan triangles, which became a rubric in which therapists can reflect upon what they are doing and where they are in relational space at any given moment.

== Early life ==
Malan was born in Ootacamund in the province of Tamil Nadu in India on 21 March 1922. His father was English, working in the Indian Civil Service as Paymaster General of Madras State, and his mother Isabel (née Allen)was American. When Malan was seven years old his father died from pneumonia and Malan and his mother came to England. They moved into a house in Hartley Wintney which served as Malan's home throughout his life. This early experience of grief was formative for his later work.

At preparatory boarding school Malan particularly enjoyed learning Latin and Greek, but as a scholar at Winchester he became interested in chemistry which he then studied, winning a scholarship to Balliol College, Oxford. He graduated in 1944 with a 1st class Honours degree in chemistry.

During the war Malan was seconded to the Special Operations Executive (S.O.E), initially to develop devices for Resistance fighters, and later incendiary bombs for use in the Far East.

He was unable to partake in active service due to a foot injury. After the war he studied medicine at The London Hospital qualifying in 1952 and then trained in psychiatry at the Maudsley Hospital. Malan began his training in psychoanalysis whilst at Medical School. His initial analysis was with Michael Balint and then with Winnicott.

After a year at Courtaulds doing fundamental research, he knew he wanted to become a Psychotherapist.

== Career ==
After qualifying from the London Hospital in 1952, he worked as a casualty officer, then as a psychiatrist at the Maudsley before transferring to the Tavistock Clinic in 1956. From 1956 to 1982, he remained at the Tavistock Clinic as a consultant psychiatrist, psychotherapist and psychoanalyst.

In 1956, at the Tavistock Clinic, Balint asked him to join his Brief Psychotherapy research group investigating whether brief focal therapy was effective. Malan analysed the results which were highly encouraging. During his early years as a psychotherapist, he already advocated the accurate, reproducible clinical descriptions, as well as the prediction of desirable outcomes prior to the process of therapy or an "intention to treat", which are then followed by unbiased evaluation post-treatment. This approach was met with suspicion during the 1950s within the analytic community, including Malan's colleagues at the Tavistock Clinic.

In 1967 Malan developed the Brief Psychotherapy workshop which all trainees were required to attend for one year and treat a patient under his supervision. It attracted students internationally as well as nationally. The aim was to achieve effective therapeutic results in the shortest possible time and to research the factors that made this happen.

The therapy was actively interpretive, using the elements of the Two Triangles – the Triangle of Conflict and the Triangle of Person - as the basis for many of the interventions that the therapists made.

The outcome data exploded the Myth of Superficiality whereby critics claimed that Brief Psychotherapy could only be helpful with superficially ill patients, that the technique used should be superficial and that only superficial improvements can be achieved.

At this time Malan lectured nationally and internationally many times in the US, Canada, Norway, Switzerland, Italy and Greece, describing his active interpretive approach and his investigation of the factors that made Brief Psychotherapy most effective. He received the highest medical Merit award for this work.

In 1974, Davanloo showed his tapes of Intensive Short-Term Dynamic Psychotherapy to Malan who was convinced by the evidence that the technique used was extremely effective. They began a twelve-year collaboration, doing workshops and lectures together with Davanloo showing his tapes of therapy and Malan outlining the concepts and explaining the principles of the technique.

In 1979, Malan wrote Individual Psychotherapy and the Science of Psychodynamics pub. Butterworth-Heinnemann which outlines the principles of Dynamic Psychotherapy from the most elementary to the most profound, using true case histories to illustrate each concept. It has been translated into 8 languages and following a second edition in 1995 is still in print as a classic textbook for psychotherapists.

== Private life ==
He was married to Muriel (née Still) from 1959 to about 1982, with whom he had a son called Peter. He later married Jennifer (Jennie) Ann (née Stead). He enjoyed travelling in the countryside with his wife Jennie including in Scotland, New Zealand and India.

== Retirement and death ==
After his retirement, Malan continued to write and lecture extensively on Brief Psychotherapy and Intensive Short Term Dynamic Therapy (ISTDP), publishing his last book "Lives Transformed", in 2006, which he co-authored with Patricia Coughlin. He also put on Conferences in Oxford in 2006 and 2008 to demonstrate the effectiveness of ISTDP as a method of Brief Psychotherapy. Following these conferences, core training courses developed, and therapists, who completed them and have become experienced, have continued to lecture and teach subsequent core trainings.

In 2005, Malan received a Career Achievement Award in recognition of his contribution to Psychotherapy from the International Experiential Dynamic Therapy Association, of which he was Emeritus President since its inception. He died in 2020.

== Brief Psychotherapy ==
Although trained as an analyst, initially using analysis in therapy, and recognising the validity of analytic insights, Malan has always been concerned that analysis takes too long and too few patients can be treated.

His research and writing therefore focussed on finding the most effective treatment that can help more patients in the shortest possible time.

Balint's Brief Therapy Research Group.

In 1956, after becoming a psychotherapist at the Tavistock Clinic, Malan was invited by Balint to join his Brief Psychotherapy research group investigating whether brief focal therapy was effective. Patients were treated using a radical interpretive approach and the results were evaluated against specified criteria and, in general, they were extremely good. Malan analysed the results in his Oxford DM thesis and subsequently developed the ideas in A Study of Brief Psychotherapy : Tavistock publications 1963. Other publications analysing aspects of the results were The Frontier of Brief Psychotherapy and Toward the Validation of Dynamic Psychotherapy - both published by Plenum in 1976.

Brief Psychotherapy Workshop

Following his appointment as a Consultant in the Adult dept., Malan introduced a Brief Psychotherapy workshop which all trainees were required to attend. They presented cases where they had used the principles of Brief Psychotherapy under his supervision. The aim was to achieve effective therapeutic results in the fewest sessions and to research the factors that made this possible.

In the workshop the technique was actively interpretive. The work was initially focussed on the presenting problems but became more wide-ranging with responsive patients and demonstrated deep and lasting changes.

An account of twenty-four therapies completed by trainees as part of the Brief Psychotherapy Workshop is summarised in ‘Psychodynamics, Training and Outcome’ by Malan and Osimo, pub. Butterworth –Heinemann 1992. It is based not only on the sessions but on the follow-up of a series of patients, and shows that good therapeutic results can be achieved by trainees under supervision.

The Two Triangles

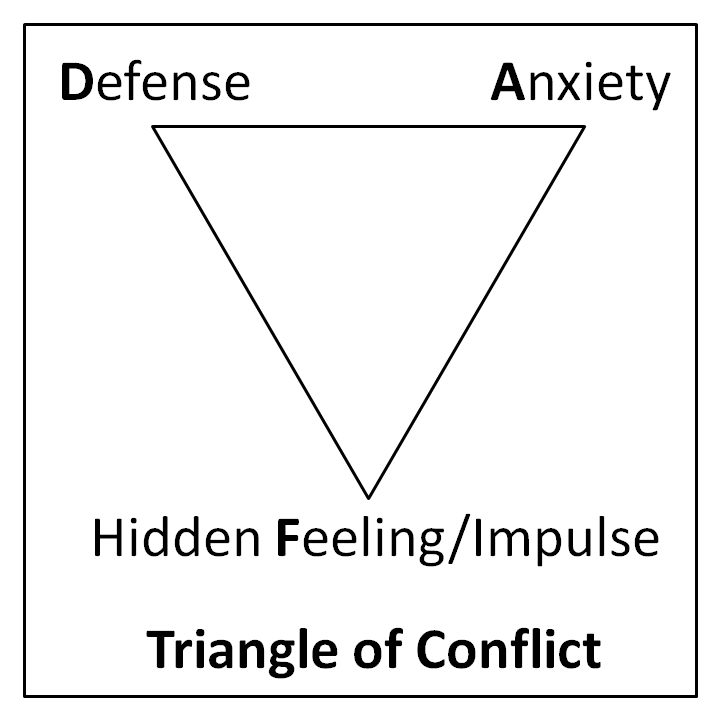
Triangle Of Conflict

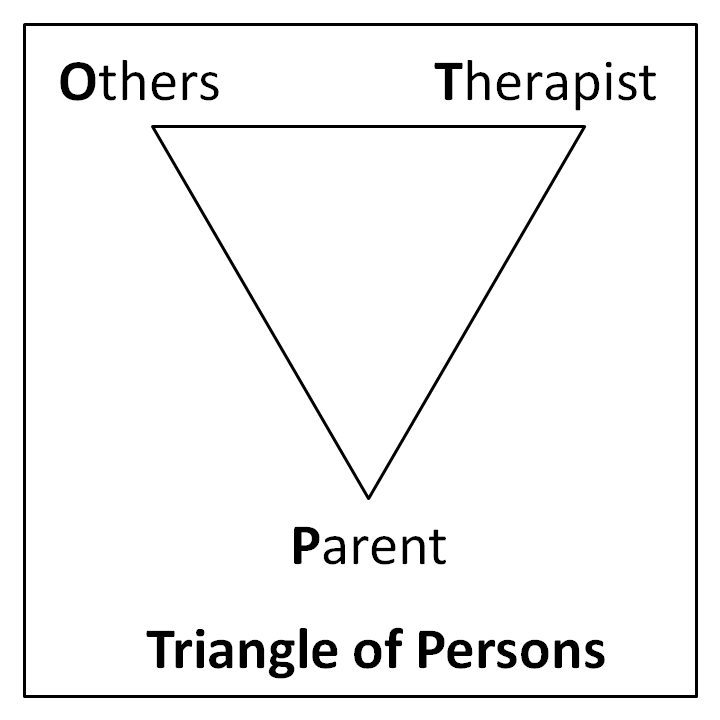
Triangle Of Persons

A key element of therapy is the linking of the Two Triangles - the Triangle of Conflict (Defence, Anxiety and Hidden Feeling) and the Triangle of Persons (Current, Transference/Present and Past). The Triangle of Conflict illustrates the relation between anxiety, defences and the underlying impulses or feelings. The Triangle of Persons shows the links between the relationship with the therapist, with current people in the patient's life, and with people from their past.

Malan always acknowledges that each Triangle was independently devised by Ezriel (1952) and Menninger (1958) respectively, but he showed how, when put together, the relation between them for the patient at any given moment in therapy, can form a reliable basis for many of the interventions that the therapist makes. Ref: Individual Psychotherapy and the Science of Psychodynamics (p. 80)

As early as 1963 in his analysis of cases in Balint's workshop, Malan had identified that good outcome correlated with a high frequency of interpretations making a link between the transference and childhood, but the full significance and usefulness of the concept of linking the Triangles came later.

The Myth of Superficiality

Research from the workshop exploded the ‘myth of superficiality’ whereby critics maintain that Brief Psychotherapy is a superficial treatment that can only be effective with superficially ill patients, bringing about superficial results. Malan maintains that the aim of every session is to ‘put the patient in touch with as much of their true feelings as they can bear and that the long-term outcome should demonstrate deep and lasting changes.’ The work does not have to be focal and limited to specific problems and should lead to therapeutic changes that are wide-ranging, deep-seated and permanent. This has been shown in many of Malan's follow-up studies where Brief Therapy and Intensive Short-term Dynamic Psychotherapy have been used.

Collaboration with Habib Davanloo

In 1974 Davanloo presented videotapes of his therapeutic work using Intensive Short-term Dynamic Psychotherapy (ISTDP) at the Tavistock Clinic. The essence of ISTDP is to enable the patient to reach and experience their hitherto buried, and often unconscious feelings, which have been governing their emotional responses leading to deep-seated neurotic patterns of behaviour that in many cases have crippled their lives. He does this by challenging the defences that the patient has been using to avoid painful feelings of loss, grief, anger, hate and guilt about people who they loved and /or needed when children.

Although aspects of Davanloo's challenging and sometimes abrasive technique were antipathetic to him, Malan recognised that the challenge was to the defences, not to the patient directly, and results were conclusive and convincing. The videotapes showed undeniable evidence that patients could be treated in a relatively few sessions (40 or fewer) and fully recover from a range of longstanding emotional and psychosomatic illnesses.

Malan and Davanloo collaborated for twelve years from 1974, doing many Conferences and Workshops worldwide. Davanloo showed his tapes of therapy while Malan outlined the rationale and objectives of the technique and explained the elements of the therapy. After his retirement, Malan wrote many books and articles about Davanloo's concepts and technique.

Subsequent Developments using Intensive Short-Term Dynamic Psychotherapy.

It became apparent that the abrasive element when challenging the defences is not necessary, and the same results can be achieved by blocking them much more gently but persistently until they disintegrate. Malan recognised that as long as the patient reaches and experiences the buried, often previously unconscious painful feelings, they no longer have the power to govern their emotional responses. It is the avoidance of these feelings that underlies many neurotic and psychosomatic symptoms.

Malan has worked with many of Davanloo's ex-trainees lecturing and writing extensively. In 2006 he co-authored with Patricia Coughlin ‘Lives Transformed – a Revolutionary Method of Dynamic Psychotherapy’ pub. Karnac.

In order to introduce Intensive Short-term Dynamic Psychotherapy to the UK, Malan organised two Conferences in Oxford in 2006 and 2008, where video-tapes of therapies were shown. Following these Core Training groups were established. Subsequent Conferences have been held demonstrating ISTDP and currently there are Core trainings in London and the North of England. Malan hopes ISTDP will become available as a treatment method on the N.H.S. as it so effective, but it is difficult to learn and challenging to do.

== Scientific principles and Brief Psychotherapy ==
A hallmark of Malan's work is his scientific approach to research in Psychotherapy. He is convinced that psychodynamic processes can and should be scientifically studied, and he rigorously insists on long-term follow-ups to see how effective therapy really has been and what factors contributed to this.

Outcome Studies

Malan believes that one of the most important tools for this ‘objective study of subjective matter’ is long-term follow-up interviews to obtain reliable psychodynamic outcome data. He considers that questionnaires are useless, and proper follow-up interviews are necessary based on the initial criteria the therapist sets for the complete resolution of the presenting problems. To this end he has carried out many such follow-ups and trained others to do so. These outcome studies are actually process and outcome studies as they analyse the process of change as well as the long-term results. He published papers throughout his career evaluating outcome data which showed that the results of Brief Psychotherapy are as good as, or better than, those found in long-term therapy.

== Publications ==
Books

A Study of Brief Psychotherapy : Tavistock publications 1963 . Reprinted Plenum 1975. Translated into 7 languages.

The Frontier of Brief Psychotherapy : Plenum 1976

Towards the Validation of Brief Psychotherapy : Plenum 1979

Individual Psychotherapy and the Science of Psychodynamics : pub. Butterworth-Heinemann !979 Second edition 1995 Reprinted in 8 languages.

Psychodynamics, Training and Outcome in Brief Psychotherapy : Malan and Osimo pub. Butterworth-Heinemann 1992

Anorexia, Murder and Suicide : pub Butterworth-Heinemann 1997

Lives transformed – a Revolutionary Method of Dynamic Psychotherapy : Malan and Coughlin pub:Karnac 2006

Throughout his career Malan consistently published research papers and wrote chapters in books.

Significant ones include:

Malan, D.H. (1978a) Exploring the limits of brief psychotherapy. In H. Davanloo (Ed.) Basic Principles and Techniques in Short-Term Dynamic Psychotherapy (pp43 –67). New York. Spectrum Publications

Malan, D.H. (1978b) Evaluation criteria for selection of patients. In H.Davanloo (Ed) Basic Principles and Techniques in Short-Term Dynamic Psychotherapy (pp. 85 –97). New York. Spectrum Publications.

Malan, D.H. (1980) The most important development in psychotherapy since the discovery of the unconscious. In H. Davanloo (Ed) Short-Term Dynamic Psychotherapy, (pp. 13–23) Northvale NJ: Aronson.

Malan, D.H. (2001) The Way Ahead. In Short-Term Therapy for Long-term Change. New York. Norton.

Malan D.H. (1986) Beyond Interpretation: Part I and II. International Journal of Short-term Psychotherapy, I (2), (pp. 59–82, 83–106)

== Sources ==
Malan, D.H. (1963) A Study of Brief Psychotherapy Tavistock Publications. Reprinted Plenum

Malan, D.H. (1976a). The Frontier of Brief Psychotherapy. New York: Plenum Press

Malan, D.H. (1976b). Toward the Validation of Dynamic Psychotherapy. New York: Plenum Press.

Malan, D.H. (1979). Individual Psychotherapy and the Science of Psychodynamics. London: Butterworth- Heinemann.

Malan, D.H. and Osimo, F. (1992). Psychodynamics, Training and Outcome in Brief Psychotherapy. London: Butterworth- Heinemann.

Malan, D.H. and Coughlin Della Selva, P. (2006) Lives Transformed – a Revolutionary Method of Dynamic psychotherapy. London Karnack

Osimo, F and Stein, M.J. Theory and Practice of Experiential Dynamic Therapy London: Karnac (pp 9–13, 23 -42).
