= William C. Menninger =

American physician (1899–1966)

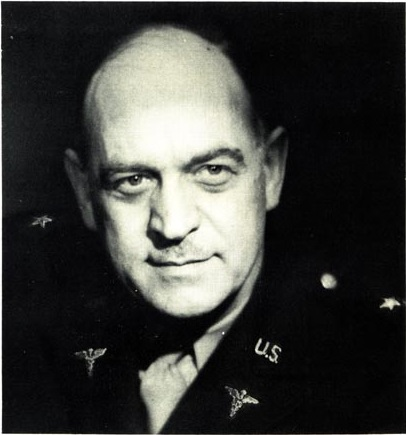
- Born: William Claire Menninger; October 15, 1899; Topeka, Kansas, U.S.
- Died: September 6, 1966 (aged 66); Topeka, Kansas, U.S.
- Occupation: Psychiatrist
- Spouse: Catharine Louisa Wright
- Children: Roy Wright Menninger; Philip Bratton Menninger; William Walter Menninger
- Parent(s): Charles Frederick Menninger; Florence Vesta Menninger
- Relatives: Karl Menninger (brother)

William Claire Menninger (October 15, 1899 – September 6, 1966) was a co-founder with his brother Karl and his father of The Menninger Foundation in Topeka, Kansas, an internationally known center for treatment of behavioral disorders.

== Life and career ==
=== Early life and education ===
Menninger was born on October 15, 1899, in Topeka, Kansas, the son of Florence Vesta (Kinsley) and Charles Frederick Menninger. He had two older brothers: Karl and Edwin. Menninger graduated from Washburn University in 1919 and went on to follow his father and brother into medicine. In 1924, he graduated from the Cornell University College of Medicine in New York State. After completing a two-year internship at Bellevue Hospital, he studied psychiatry at St. Elizabeths Hospital in Washington, D.C., in 1927.

=== Marriage and family ===
Menninger married Catherine Wright on December 11, 1925. They had three sons together: Roy W. Menninger, Philip B. Menninger, and W. Walter Menninger. They later each became active in the Boy Scouts, reaching the rank of Eagle Scouts, and each receiving the Distinguished Eagle Scout Award.

=== Psychiatry ===
In 1927 Menninger returned to Topeka, where he joined his father and brother Karl in their medical practice. By that time, they had already begun to specialize in psychiatry, a relatively new field in the United States. With his contributions, the Menninger Clinic evolved into the Menninger Sanitarium. Together they developed the Menninger Foundation. This non-profit organization has provided clinical services to both in- and out-patients, and engages in research, education, and social outreach.

Menninger was an early innovator and advocate for the use of bibliotherapy in treating mental illness. Along with his brother Karl, Menninger utilized bibliotherapy at the Menninger Clinic. Following the success of Karl's book, The Human Mind, Menninger presented a paper to the American Psychiatric Association in 1937.

=== Boy Scouts ===
Menninger was involved with the Boy Scouts of America's Sea Scouts program in the 1930s. He was skipper of the S.S.S. Kansan, which was the National Flagship for 1931 and 1933. The skipper's manual which he wrote for the Kansas Sea Scouts was later used as the basis for the BSA's Handbook for Skippers. Menninger was also a member of the National Sea Scout Committee during this time. Each of his three sons later became active in the Scouts, attaining the rank of Eagle Scout.

=== Second World War ===
At the outset of World War II, Menninger left the family foundation for an appointment as the director of the Psychiatry Consultants Division in the office of the Surgeon General of the United States Army. He chaired the committee which produced document Medical 203, a major revision of existing US classification of mental disorders. It was adopted by all the armed services.

Following the war, this document strongly influenced the first mental disorders section of the International Statistical Classification of Diseases published in 1949. Its influence could be seen even more on the first Diagnostic and Statistical Manual of Mental Disorders, published in 1952. Menninger attained the rank of brigadier general (O-7) in the U.S. Army.

== Sources ==
- Rebecca Jo Plant, "William Menninger and American psychoanalysis, 1946–48", History of Psychiatry, Vol. 16, No. 2, 181–202 (2005)
