= Karl Menninger =

American psychiatrist

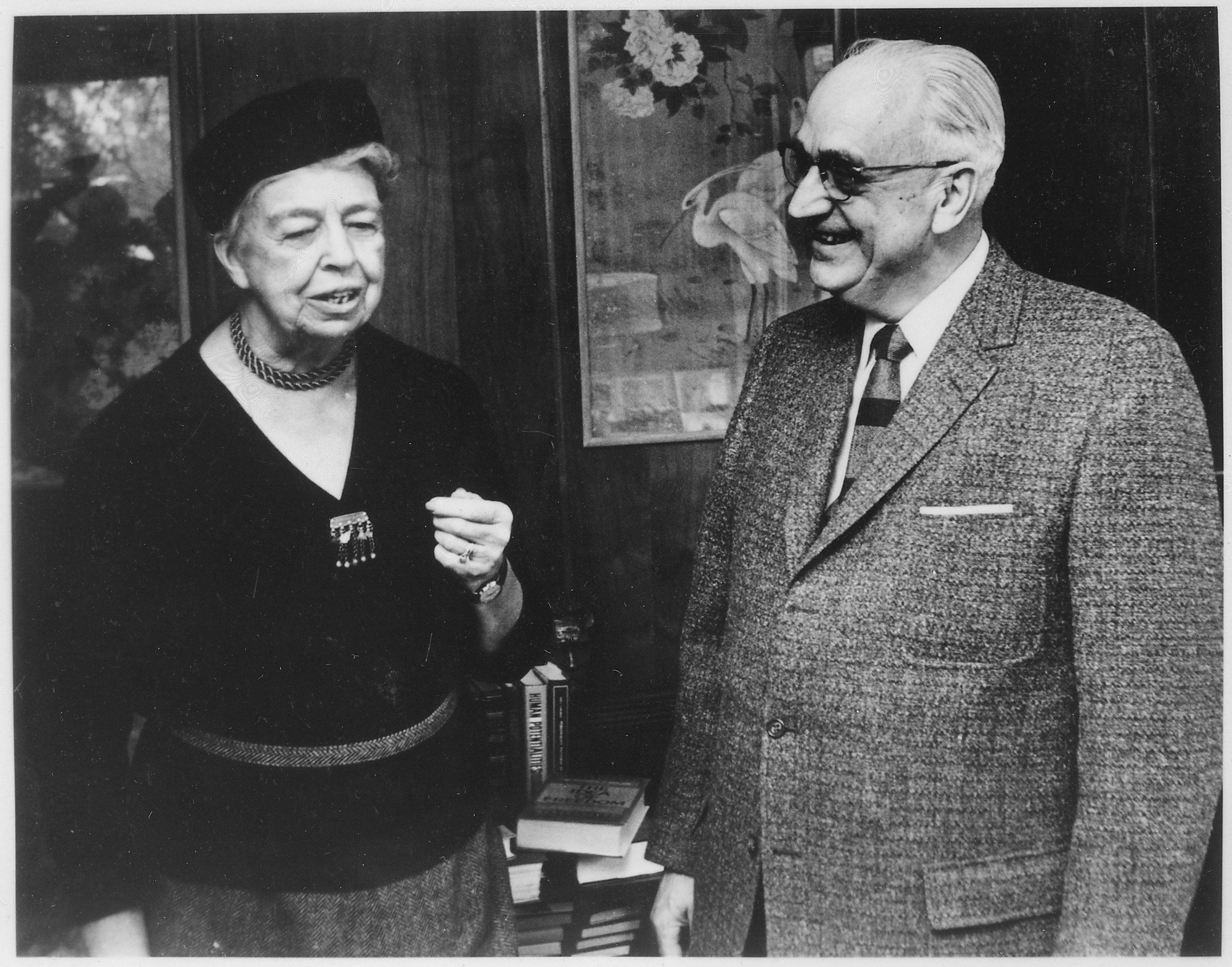
- Karl Menninger with former First Lady Eleanor Roosevelt, February 1959
- Born: Karl Augustus Menninger; July 22, 1893; Topeka, Kansas, U.S.
- Died: July 18, 1990 (aged 96); Topeka, Kansas, U.S.
- Occupation: Psychiatrist
- Spouses: Grace Gaines; Jeanetta Lyle
- Children: 4
- Relatives: Will Menninger (brother)

Karl Augustus Menninger (July 22, 1893 – July 18, 1990) was an American psychiatrist, author, and activist. He was a member of the Menninger family of psychiatrists who founded the Menninger Foundation and the Menninger Clinic in Topeka, Kansas.

He wrote many books including The Human Mind (1930), Man Against Himself (1938), Love Against Hate (1942), The Vital Balance (1963) and The Crime of Punishment (1968). During his life he advocated for a number of causes including children suffering from abuse or neglect, Native Americans, women's rights, prisoners, the elderly, the environment, wildlife, and against nuclear weapons.

Despite being one of the most famous psychiatrists during his time, he was an outsider to mainstream psychiatry, calling the DSM-II a modern "Witches Hammer Manual."

== Early life ==
Menninger was born on July 22, 1893, in Topeka, Kansas, the son of Florence Vesta (Kinsley) and Charles Frederick Menninger. In addition to studying at Washburn University, Indiana University and the University of Wisconsin–Madison, he also studied medicine at Harvard Medical School. He graduated from the school cum laude in 1917. While at Washburn, he was a member of the Alpha Delta Fraternity, a local group. In 1960 he was inducted into the school's Sagamore Honor Society.

After his internship and his service as part of the Naval Reserve during World War I, Menninger worked at the Boston Psychopathic Hospital under Elmer Ernest Southard while also teaching neuropathology at Harvard Medical School. He would remain until the death of Southard in 1919

== Menninger Clinic, Foundation and School ==
In 1919, he returned to Topeka where, together with his father, he founded the Menninger Clinic. By 1925, they had attracted enough investors, including brother William C. Menninger, to build the Menninger Sanitarium.

The Menninger Foundation was established in 1941. After World War II, Karl Menninger was instrumental in founding the Winter Veterans Administration Hospital, in Topeka. It became the largest psychiatric training center in the world.

While the clinic housed Freudian analysts, there was no commitment to any one form of therapy and a belief in the therapeutic value of a warm and caring environment.

In 1946 he founded the Menninger School of Psychiatry. He would serve as the dean until 1970. It was renamed in his honor in 1985 as the Karl Menninger School of Psychiatry and Mental Health Science. In 1952, Karl Targownik, who would become one of his closest friends, joined the Clinic.

== Other psychiatric work ==
In 1930, he wrote his first book The Human Mind, where he argued that psychiatry was a science and that the mentally ill were only slightly different from healthy individuals.

While Man Against Himself is published exclusively under Menninger's name, he acknowledges significant contributions in the acknowledgements of the book by Jeanetta Lyle, the editorial secretary of the Menninger Clinic at that time. Additionally, in at least one copy of the book, he inscribed the book for Jean Lyle, referring to her as his "co-author."

From 1941-1942 he would serve a term as the president of the American Psychoanalytic Association (APsA).

In his 1963 book, The Vital Balance, he and his co-authors disagreed with diagnoses as they existed in psychiatry. While not going as far as saying mental illness is a myth, the book talked about mental disorganization as more generalized and more recoverable than was seen in mainstream psychiatry.

He was considered an outsider to mainstream psychiatry, for example calling the 1968 DSM-II a modern “Witches Hammer Manual”. He also, despite calling himself "more Freudian than Freud" was not particularly attached to doctrine from that tradition, referring to organized psychoanalysis as "the Vatican".

From 1946 to 1962 he was a professor of psychiatry at University of Kansas City Medical School Late in life he also taught criminology, mental hygiene and abnormal psychiatry at Washburn University.

In 1971, He attended a psychoanalitic congress in Vienna where he talked with Anna Freud, Sigmund Freud's daughter. They were both interested in pediatric psychiatry

=== Letter to Szasz ===
In 1988, Karl Menninger wrote a letter to Thomas Szasz, a psychiatrist who viewed mental illness to be a myth. In the letter, Menninger said that he had just read Szasz's book Insanity: The Idea and Its Consequences. Menninger wrote that neither of them liked the situation in which insanity separates men from men and free will is forgotten. After recounting the lack of scientific method in psychology over the years, Menninger expressed his regret that he did not come over to a dialogue with Szasz.

== Prison reform ==
Karl Menninger and with his brother Will had been activists for prison reform for a while before publishing The Crime of Punishment. In the book and elsewhere, Menninger argued that current prison system was based on a "vindictive attitude" toward crime and on retributive justice and that correctional facilities did little "correcting" of behavior. He argued that crime was preventable and real rehabilitation possible through educational programs. He argues that crime was not a disease but an illness and that treatment should be psychiatric in nature. The book's reception may have been coloured by the fact that he was considered an "outsider" by specialists.

== Activism for children ==
In 1964 Topeka, Kansas, Karl Menninger founded The Villages, group homes for youth. Later in life he would spend a third of the year doing preventative psychiatry for the foster children.

== Criticisms ==
While parts of his correspondence seem to describe him as sympathetic to Jewish refugees and Black people, other facts add nuance. He favored a quota on Jewish refugees, and did nothing to alter segregation in the Menninger Foundation.

He also called homosexuality an evil and a sin in a 1963 introduction to the American edition of the Wolfenden Report

== Memberships in organizations ==
He was among the first members of the Society for General Systems Research. He also belonged to The American Indian Defense Association, The Kansas State Historical Society, American League to Abolish Capital Punishment, the Planned Parenthood Federation and the Council on Freedom From Censorship.

== Personal life ==
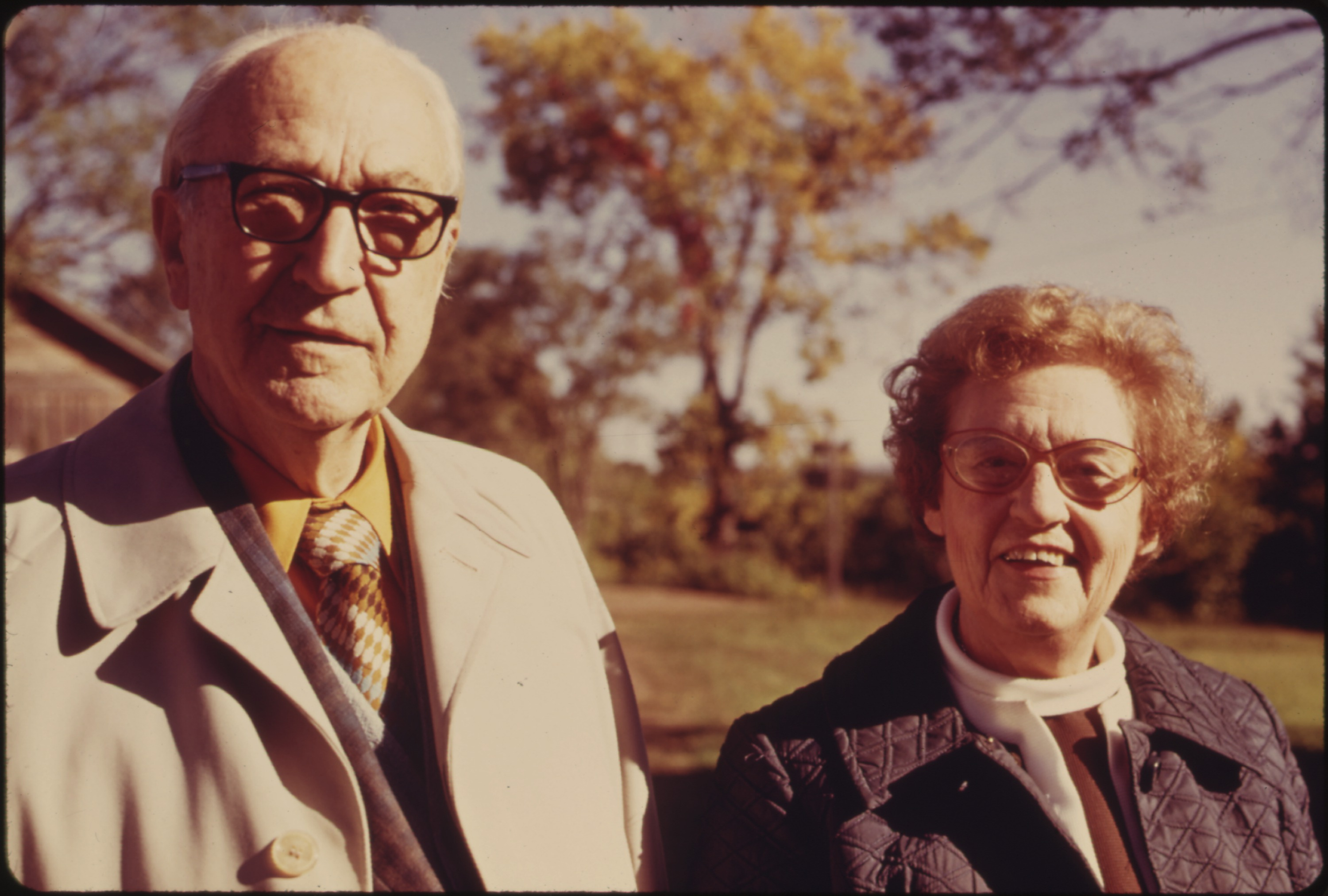
Karl Menninger with his wife Jeanette in 1974

Menninger married Grace Gaines in 1916, with whom he had three children: Martha, Julia and Robert. The couple divorced in February 1941. Menninger remarried on September 9, 1941, taking Jeanette Lyle as his wife. Together they adopted a daughter named Rosemary in 1948.

He was a practicing Presbyterian as well as a Freemason

== Death ==
He died of abdominal cancer July 18, 1990, four days before his 97th birthday.

== Honors ==
- Beginning in 1962, the American Psychiatric Association gave Menninger the Isaac Ray Award, then The First Distinguished Service Award in 1965, and the First Founders Award in 1977.
- In 1978 The American Medical Association gave Menninger the Sheen Award.
- In 1981, Menninger was awarded the Presidential Medal of Freedom by Jimmy Carter.
- In 1985, the Menninger School of Psychiatry was named for him.

== Publications ==
Menninger wrote several books and articles. A selection:

- 1930. The Human Mind. Garden City, NY: Garden City Pub. Co.
- 1931. From Sin to Psychiatry, an Interview on the Way to Mental Health with Dr. Karl A. Menninger [by] L. M. Birkhead. Little Blue Books Series #1585. Girard, Kansas: Haldeman-Julius Press.
- 1938. Man Against Himself. New York: Harcourt, Brace.
- 1942. Love Against Hate
- 1950. Guide to Psychiatric Books; with a Suggested Basic Reading List. New York: Grune & Stratton.
- 1952. Manual for Psychiatric Case Study. New York: Grune & Stratton.
- 1958. Theory of Psychoanalytic Technique. New York: Basic Books.
- 1959. A Psychiatrist's World: Selected Papers. New York: Viking Press.
- 1963. The Vital Balance: The Life Process in Mental Health and Illness. New York: Viking Penguin.
- 1968. Das Leben als Balance; seelische Gesundheit und Krankheit im Lebensprozess. München: R. Piper.
- 1968. The Crime of Punishment. New York: Penguin Books.
- 1972. A Guide to Psychiatric Books in English [by] Karl Menninger. New York: Grune & Stratton.
- 1973 Sparks
- 1973. Whatever Became of Sin?. New York: Hawthorn Books.
- 1978. The Human Mind Revisited: Essays in Honor of Karl A. Menninger. Edited by Sydney Smith. New York: International Universities Press.
- 1981. Sexuality, Law, and the Developmentally Disabled Person: Legal and Clinical Aspects of Marriage, Parenthood and Sterilization (with Sarah R. Haavik)
- 1985. Conversations with Dr. Karl Menninger (sound recording)
- 1989. The Selected Correspondence of Karl A. Menninger 1919-1945
- 1995. The Selected Correspondence of Karl A. Menninger 1946-1965

== See also ==
- Malan triangles
- Timeline of psychiatry
