= Charles Frederick Menninger =

American physician

- Born: July 11, 1862; Tell City, Indiana
- Died: November 28, 1953 (aged 91)
- Education: Hahnemann Medical College
- Occupation: Physician

Charles Frederick Menninger (11 July 1862 – 28 November 1953) was a physician who co-founded the Menninger Foundation with his sons, Karl and William.

== Biography ==
Charles Menninger was born in Tell City, Indiana on July 11, 1862. He was the sixth of August Valentine and Katarina (née Schmitberger) Menninger's eight children and their youngest son. Menninger obtained a bachelor's degree from Central Normal College in 1882 and after graduating he accepted a teaching position at Campbell College.

Menninger married Florence Vesta Knisley, on January 15, 1885, and together they had three children: Karl, Edwin, and William. Florence died on February 9, 1945, and he married Pearl Boam on June 15, 1948. He died on November 28, 1953.

Menninger completed his medical training at Chicago's Hahnemann Medical College in 1889 and moved to Topeka, Kansas where a small medical school, affiliated with Washburn College, was operated by members of the local medical community. He was taken on as a junior partner by Henry Roby, who influenced his pursuit of additional medical training focused on internal medicine and metabolic issues. Menninger graduated from the Kansas Medical College in 1906 and was elected to the faculty of the medical college. In 1919, upon completion of his son Karl's medical training at the Boston Psychopathic Hospital, the two formed a professional partnership and opened the Menninger Clinic. His other son William C. Menninger joined them in 1925 and the facility was renamed the Menninger Sanitarium. It eventually evolved into the Menninger Foundation, a national institution for the study and care of people suffering from mental illnesses.

== Legacy ==
The Charles Frederick Menninger Award is given by the American Psychoanalytic Association for original research in psycho-analysis.
