= List of people from Topeka, Kansas =

This is a list of people from Topeka, Kansas.

== Academia ==
- Warren Faidley (1957– ), meteorologist, storm chaser
- William T. Frankenberger (1952–2021), soil scientist
- Riley Gardner (1921–2007), psychologist
- Wes Jackson (1936– ), environmentalist, The Land Institute
- Sokoni Karanja (1940– ), child development expert
- G. Warren Nutter (1923–1979), economist
- Ruth Patrick (1907–2013), botanist, limnologist, recipient of the Tyler Prize for Environmental Achievement
- Walton T. Roth (1939– ), psychiatrist and psychophysiological researcher
- David Curtis Skaggs, Jr. (1937– ), historian
- John Brooks Slaughter (1934–2023), electrical engineer, National Science Foundation director

== Arts and entertainment ==
=== Film, television, and theatre ===
- Brandon Adams (1979– ), actor
- Annette Bening (1958– ), actress
- Gregg Binkley (1963– ), actor
- Roscoe Born (1950–2020), actor
- Jack Colvin (1934–2005), actor
- Samuel M. Comer (1893–1974), set decorator
- George Dickerson (1933–2015), actor, poet, writer
- Jayne Houdyshell (1953– ), actress
- Jeff Kready, Broadway actor
- Alix Lapri, actress
- Ted North (1916–1975), actor
- Sheila Ryan (1921–1975), actress
- Travis Schuldt (1974– ), actor
- Lois Smith (1930– ), actress
- Fay Tincher (1884–1983), actress

=== Journalism ===
- Allen W. Clark (1867–1931), journalist, businessman
- Audrey Cooper, journalist and news executive
- Elizabeth Farnsworth (1943– ), broadcaster, filmmaker
- Donald C. Thompson (1885–1947), war photographer, director, producer

=== Literature ===
- Thomas Fox Averill (1949– ), novelist
- Gwendolyn Brooks (1917–2000), poet
- Irene Bennett Brown, author of children's, young adult and adult fiction
- Jeannette Eyerly (1908–2008), novelist, columnist
- Janet Fox (1940–2009), fantasy and horror writer, poet
- Jane Heap (1883–1964), editor, publisher
- Ben Lerner (1979– ), poet
- Karen Salyer McElmurray (1956– ), essayist, novelist
- Eric McHenry (1972– ), poet
- Frances Clarke Sayers (1897–1989), author, lecturer, librarian
- Ed Skoog (1971– ), poet
- Linda Spalding (1943– ), novelist, editor
- Rex Stout (1886–1975), novelist
- Max Yoho (1934–2017), author
- Kevin Young (1970/1971– ), poet, author, director of the National Museum of African American History and Culture

=== Music ===
- Phil Ehart (1950– ), drummer, founding member of the band Kansas
- Streamline Ewing (1917–2002), jazz trombonist
- Aulsondro "Emcee N.I.C.E." Hamilton, musician, member of KansasCali, known for Crash soundtrack
- Coleman Hawkins (1904–1969), jazz saxophonist
- Dave Hope (1949– ), bass guitarist, former member of Kansas
- Josh Kulick, former heavy metal drummer for Through the Eyes of the Dead
- Katrina Leskanich (1960– ), singer (Katrina and the Waves)
- Kerry Livgren (1949– ), founding member of the bands Kansas and AD
- Andy McKee (1979– ), musician
- Kirke Mechem (1925– ), composer
- Origin, metal band
- Kliph Scurlock (1973– ), drummer
- Jamshied Sharifi (1960– ), composer, musician
- Carolyn Smith-Meyer (1935–2003), operatic soprano
- Kenny Starr (1952– ), country singer
- Rich Williams (1950– ), guitarist, member of Kansas

=== Other visual arts ===
- James Pringle Cook (1947– ), Western landscape painter
- Aaron Douglas (1899–1979), Harlem Renaissance artist
- Georgia Louise Harris Brown (1918–1999), architect
- Peter Max Lawrence (1977– ), contemporary media artist

== Business ==
- Henry Bubb (1907–1989), president and chairman of Capitol Federal Savings Bank
- Brad Garlinghouse (1971– ), business executive, investor
- Cyrus K. Holliday (1826–1900), first president of Atchison, Topeka & Santa Fe railroad; founder of Topeka township
- John F. Kilmartin (1921–2004), retail executive

== Crime ==
- Richard Gary Beach (1942–), convicted mass murderer
- Alvin "Creepy" Karpis (1907–1979), kidnapper, murderer, robber
- Anthony LaRette (1951–1995), convicted serial killer executed in Missouri
- Amy Watkins (1973–1999), murder victim

== Medicine ==
- Karl Bowman (1888–1973), psychiatrist
- Harriet Lerner (1944– ), clinical psychologist and author
- Karl Menninger (1893–1990), psychiatrist
- Roy W. Menninger (1926–2024), psychiatrist
- William C. Menninger (1899–1966), psychiatrist
- W. Walter Menninger (1931– ), psychiatrist
- Karl Targownik (1915–1996), psychiatrist and Holocaust survivor

== Military ==
- Wilder D. Baker (1890–1975), U.S. Navy vice admiral during World War II
- Ronald Evans (1933–1990), astronaut
- Harry D. Felt (1902–1992), U.S. Navy admiral
- Donald Hudson (1895–1967), World War I flying ace
- Joseph K. Hudson (1840–1907), U.S. Army brigadier general
- Philip Johnston (1892–1978), U.S. Marine Corps code-talker
- Frank E. Petersen (1932–2015), U.S. Marine Corps lt. general

== Politics ==
=== National ===
- Linda Carol Brown (1943–2018), plaintiff in Brown v. Board of Education
- Oliver Brown (1918–1961), plaintiff in Brown v. Board of Education
- Arthur Capper (1865–1951), U.S. senator from Kansas, 20th governor of Kansas
- Helen Chenoweth-Hage (1938–2006), U.S. representative from Idaho
- Albert M. Cole (1901–1994), U.S. representative from Kansas
- Sam A. Crow (1926–2022), U.S. federal judge
- Charles Curtis (1860–1936), 31st vice president of the United States
- Ron Estes (1956– ), U.S. representative for Kansas and Kansas state treasurer
- Harry W. Fraser (1884–1950), labor leader
- David Archibald Harvey (1845–1916), U.S. House delegate from Oklahoma Territory
- Donald R. Heath (1894–1981), U.S. ambassador to Cambodia, Laos, Lebanon, Saudi Arabia, and Vietnam
- Zelma Henderson (1920–2008), plaintiff in Brown v. Board of Education
- Nancy Kassebaum (1932– ), U.S. senator from Kansas
- Alf Landon (1887–1987), 26th governor of Kansas, 1936 Republican candidate for U.S. president
- Jake LaTurner (1988– ), former U.S. representative from Kansas, state treasurer, and state senator
- John Thomas Marten (1951– ), U.S. federal judge
- John Martin (1833–1913), U.S. senator from Kansas
- Isabell Masters (1913–2011), perennial third-party candidate for U.S. president
- Noah C. McFarland (1822–1897), commissioner of the United States General Land Office
- John G. Otis (1838–1916), U.S. representative from Kansas
- Brad Parscale (1976– ), campaign manager for Donald Trump
- Megan Phelps-Roper (1986– ), political activist and former member and dissident of the Westboro Baptist Church
- Nathan Phelps (1958– ), LGBT rights activist
- Shirley Phelps-Roper (1957– ), lawyer, anti-LGBT political activist
- John Ritchie (1817-1887), abolitionist
- Pat Roberts (1936– ), U.S. senator from Kansas
- William R. Roy (1926–2014), U.S. representative from Kansas
- Thomas Ryan (1837–1914), U.S. representative from Kansas and ambassador to Mexico
- John States Seybold (1897–1982), governor of Panama Canal Zone
- Jim Slattery (1948– ), U.S. representative from Kansas
- John L. Waller (1850–1907), U.S. consul to Madagascar

=== State ===
- John Alcala (1959– ), Kansas state legislator
- Carol A. Beier (1958– ), Kansas Supreme Court justice
- Robert Coldsnow (1924–2014), Kansas state legislator
- Robert E. Davis (1939–2010), Kansas Supreme Court chief justice
- Joan Finney (1925–2001), 42nd governor of Kansas
- Shanti Gandhi (1940– ), physician and legislator
- A. C. Hamlin (1881–1912), Oklahoma state legislator
- Alexander Miller Harvey (1867–1928), 15th lieutenant governor of Kansas
- Anthony Hensley (1953– ), Kansas state legislator
- Marla Luckert (1955– ), Kansas Supreme Court justice
- Lutie Lytle (1875–1950), lawyer, first African-American woman admitted to Kansas bar
- Kay McFarland (1935–2015), Kansas Supreme Court chief justice
- Eric Rosen (1953– ), Kansas Supreme Court justice
- Caleb Stegall (1971– ), Kansas Supreme Court justice
- Jeff Stone (1961– ), Wisconsin state legislator
- Clifford W. Trow (1929– ), Oregon state legislator
- William C. Webb (1824-1898), Wisconsin and Kansas legislator
- Jackie Winters (1937–2019), Oregon state legislator

=== Local ===
- Jacob Alan Dickinson (1911–1971), Topeka Board of Education president, desegregation supporter

== Religion ==
- Lillian M. Mitchner (1862/64–1954), social reformer; president, Kansas State Woman's Christian Temperance Union
- Fred Phelps (1929–2014), leader of the Westboro Baptist Church
- Charles Sheldon (1857–1946), minister, author

== Sports ==
=== American football ===
- Chris Beatty (1973– ), coach
- Tom Dinkel (1956– ), linebacker
- Forrestal Hickman (1993– ), offensive tackle
- Teven Jenkins (1998– ), offensive tackle
- Mike Lemon (1951– ), linebacker
- Trey Lewis (1985– ), defensive tackle
- Lamar Mady (1990– ), center
- Larry McGinnis (1899–1948), guard
- Jack Nason (1899–1977), tackle, wingback
- John H. Outland (1871–1947), college football coach and namesake of Outland Trophy
- John Parrella (1969– ), defensive tackle
- Ryan Torain (1986– ), running back
- Chuck Washington (1964– ), defensive back
- Troy Wilson (1970– ), defensive end

=== Baseball ===
- Aaron Crow (1986– ), pitcher
- Rick DeHart (1970– ), pitcher
- Bingo DeMoss (1889–1965), 2nd baseman, manager
- Art Griggs (1884–1938), 1st baseman
- Ross Grimsley (1950– ), pitcher
- Clarence Heise (1907–1999), pitcher
- Larry Miller (1937–2018), pitcher
- Dink Mothell (1897–1980), pitcher, utility player
- Don O'Riley (1945–1997), pitcher
- Scott Taylor (1966– ), pitcher
- Mike Torrez (1946– ), pitcher
- Ryan Zeferjahn (1998– ), pitcher

=== Basketball ===
- Chris Babb (1990– ), shooting guard in the Israeli Basketball Premier League
- Leo Lyons (1987– ), power forward
- Fred Slaughter (1941–2016), center, sports agent
- Dean Smith (1931–2015), University of North Carolina and Basketball Hall of Fame coach
- Mark Turgeon (1965– ), head basketball coach at University of Maryland; formerly coach at Texas A&M University
- Kyle Weems (1989– ), small forward

=== Golf ===
- Marilynn Smith (1929–2019), pro golfer and LPGA co-founder, member of World Golf Hall of Fame
- Gary Woodland (1984– ), golfer

=== Racing ===
- Fred Comer (1893–1928), race car driver
- Louis Durant (1910–1972), race car driver
- Bruce Hill (1949–2017), race car driver

=== Softball ===
- NiJaree Canady (2003– ), pitcher

=== Other ===
- Simon Becher (1999– ), soccer player
- Bob Benoit (1954– ), pro bowler
- Casey Converse (1957– ), U.S. Olympic swimmer, coach
- Art Crews (1959– ), pro wrestler
- Bob Davis (1945– ), sportscaster
- Bill Disney (1932–2009), U.S. Olympic speed skater
- Jack Disney (1930–2024), U.S. Olympic cyclist
- Melvin Douglas, Olympic wrestler, 1996 and 2000 and World Championship gold medalist
- Max Falkenstien (1924–2019), radio broadcaster
- Margaret Thompson Murdock (1942– ), member of the Kansas Sports Hall of Fame, and first woman to win a medal in shooting at the Summer Olympics
- Charles Nelson (1933– ), U.S. Olympic volleyball player
- Anna Seaton (1964– ), U.S. Olympic rower

== See also ==
- List of lists of people from Kansas
