= Education in Kansas =

Education in Kansas is governed at the primary and secondary school level by the Kansas State Board of Education. The state's public colleges and universities are supervised by the Kansas Board of Regents.

== Colleges and universities ==
The Kansas Board of Regents governs or supervises thirty-seven public institutions. It also authorizes numerous private and out-of-state institutions to operate in the state. In Fall 2009, the state's six public universities reported a combined enrollment of 93,307 students, of which more than a quarter were non-resident students and more than a seventh were off-campus enrollments.

Among the state-funded universities, the University of Kansas (KU) is the largest in terms of enrollment, with 26,826 at its Lawrence campus, KU Edwards Campus in Overland Park, and Public Management Center (formerly the Capitol Complex) in Topeka. The total university enrollment, which includes KU Medical Center, was 30,004. About 31% were non-resident students.

Kansas State University (KSU) has the second largest enrollment, with 23,581 students at its Manhattan and Salina campuses and Veterinary Medical Center. About 19% were non-resident students. Wichita State University (WSU) ranks third largest with 14,823 students; about 14% were non-resident students. WSU has lost nearly 3,000 students since the school dropped football following the 1986 season. Fort Hays State University (FHSU), Pittsburg State University (PSU), and Emporia State University (ESU) are smaller public universities with total enrollments of 11,308, 7277, and 6314, respectively. FHSU has the fastest growing enrollment in Kansas with most of it coming from non-resident and off-campus enrollment. The composition of FHSU's enrollment includes 35% non-resident students and 44% off-campus enrollments. PSU also has almost a quarter of enrollment from non-residents.

For more on the universities and colleges in Kansas, see the complete list.

=== History ===
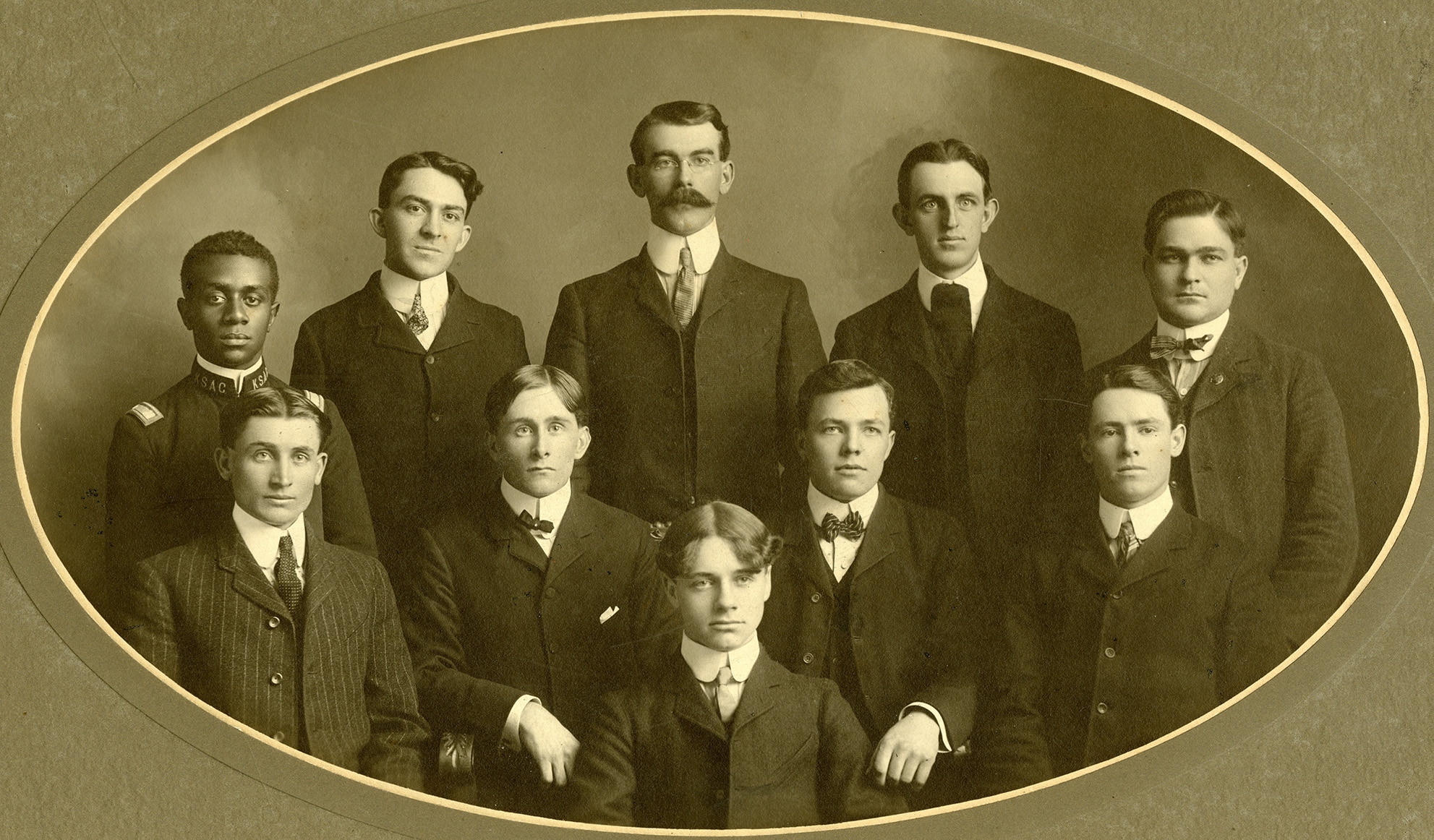
Mechanical engineering students at Kansas State in 1904

The first colleges in Kansas were chartered by acts of the Kansas Territorial legislature, signed by Territorial Governor James W. Denver, on February 9–12, 1858. Among the ten institutes of higher learning chartered at that time, three survive in some form. Among those chartered on February 9 were Highland University (precursor to Highland Community College) and Blue Mont Central College (precursor to Kansas State University). Baker University, chartered on February 12, 1858, has been operating continuously since that time and is now recognized as the oldest continuously operating college in Kansas.

All of the colleges founded in 1858 were private institutions. The first public institute of higher learning in the state was Kansas State University (originally named Kansas State Agricultural College), which was established by the state legislature on February 16, 1863.

The state's universities were among the first public universities in the country to be coeducational. Kansas State became the second coeducational public institution of higher education when it opened in 1863; enrollment for the first session was 52 students: 26 men and 26 women. The University of Kansas was also among the earliest to offer mixed-sex education, in 1869. Both KU and Kansas State were also open to students of all races from their inception.

== Primary and secondary schools ==
=== School district consolidation ===
The number of students in rural communities dropped significantly across the 20th century. As farming technology progressed from animal power to small tractors towards large tractors over time, it allowed a farmer to support significantly more farm land. In turn, this led to fewer farm families, which led to fewer rural students. In combination with a loss of young men during foreign wars and rural flight, all of these caused an incremental population shrinkage of rural communities over time. In 1945 (after World War II), the School Reorganization Act in Kansas caused the consolidation of thousands of rural school districts in Kansas (mostly one room rural school houses). In 1963, the School Unification Act in Kansas caused the further consolidatation of thousands of tiny school districts into hundreds of larger Unified School Districts.

=== Brown v. Board of Education of Topeka ===
The landmark 1954 decision in Brown v. Board of Education of Topeka, in which the United States Supreme Court ruled segregation in public schools unconstitutional, was brought as a legal challenge to a Kansas law permitting racial segregation in primary and secondary schools in Kansas towns with a population over 15,000.

In 1951, a class action suit was filed against the Board of Education of the City of Topeka, Kansas in the United States District Court for the District of Kansas. The plaintiffs were thirteen Topeka parents on behalf of their 20 children.

The suit called for the school district to reverse its policy of racial segregation. The Topeka Board of Education operated separate elementary schools under an 1879 Kansas law, which permitted (but did not require) districts to maintain separate elementary school facilities for black and white students in 12 communities with populations over 15,000. The plaintiffs had been recruited by the leadership of the Topeka NAACP. Notable among the Topeka NAACP leaders were the chairman McKinley Burnett; Charles Scott, one of three serving as legal counsel for the chapter; and Lucinda Todd.

The named plaintiff, Oliver L. Brown, was a parent, a welder in the shops of the Santa Fe Railroad, an assistant pastor at his local church, and an African American. He was convinced to join the lawsuit by Scott, a childhood friend. Brown's daughter Linda, a third grader, had to walk six blocks to her school bus stop to ride to Monroe Elementary, her segregated black school one mile (1.6 km) away, while Sumner Elementary, a white school, was seven blocks from her house.

=== Evolution controversy ===
In 1999, the Kansas Board of Education ruled that instruction at the primary and secondary levels about evolution, the age of the Earth, and the origin of the universe was permitted, but not mandatory, and that those topics would not appear on state standardized tests. However, two years later, following a change in its elected membership, the Board reversed this decision on February 14, 2001, ruling that instruction of all those topics was mandatory and that they would appear on standardized tests.

Following another change in membership, on August 9, 2005, the Board of Education approved a draft of science curriculum standards that mandated equal time for evolution and intelligent design.

On November 8, 2005, the Board of Education voted 6–4 to allow science students in public schools to hear materials critical of evolution in biology classes, allowing teaching of Intelligent design to be taught in classes. The board, in order to accommodate the teaching of Intelligent Design in biology class, went so far as to redefine the meaning of science to 'no longer limited to the search for natural explanations of phenomena.'

In response, USD 383 (Manhattan-Ogden) decided to reject the November 2005 standards in a unanimous decision in February 2006, and continues to use the March 9, 2005 standards.

On August 1, 2006, the creationist majority on the Board of Education was voted out of office and evolution candidates were given the majority once again.

On February 13, 2007, the Board voted 6 to 4 to reject the amended science standards enacted in 2005. The definition of science was once again limited to "the search for natural explanations for what is observed in the universe."

=== Sports ===
Statewide elections for the Kansas Board of Education are held every four years. According to Christopher Lee, small town Kansas high schools used football as a way to entertain and unite their rural communities. The schools were too small for 11-man teams so they adopted the six-man team system developed by Stephen E. Epler. Football stimulated a collective spirit between school and community, with the games becoming a social outlet and a favorite topic of weeklong conversations and boosterism. There was an economic bonus as well when hundreds of fans drove into small depression-hit towns. Six-man football peaked in the mid-1950s. However the decline on younger rural populations and school consolidation led schools to move to eight-man football by the 1960s.

== See also ==
- List of colleges and universities in Kansas
- List of defunct colleges and universities in Kansas
- List of unified school districts in Kansas
- Kansas evolution hearings
