= Peter Laurence =

Peter Laurence may refer to:

- Peter Laurence (sport shooter)
- Peter Laurence (diplomat)

== See also ==
- Peter Lawrence (disambiguation)
