= Peter Lawrence =

Peter Lawrence may refer to:

- Peter Lawrence (pirate) (fl. 1693–1705), Dutch privateer and pirate (real name Pieter Laurens)
- Peter Lawrence (anthropologist) (1921–1987), British-born Australian anthropologist
- Peter Anthony Lawrence (born 1941), English developmental biologist
- Peter Lawrence (politician), New York State Assembly member elected 2014
- Peter Lawrence (teacher) (1913–2005), British teacher and author
- Peter Lawrence (stage manager) (born 1944), American stage manager
- Peter Lee Lawrence (1945–1974), German actor
- Peter Max Lawrence (born 1977), American contemporary artist
- Peter B. Lawrence, British amateur astronomer
- Pete Lawrence (born 1957), musician
- Peter Gordon Lawrence, founder of PGL, a provider of school activity courses and summer camps
- Peter Godfrey Lawrence (1920–1953), aviator
- Peter Lawrence (actor) (died 1998, fl. 1960-1996), actor, see Marco Polo (Doctor Who)

== See also ==
- Peter Laurence (disambiguation)
