= Verda Byrd =

American author (born 1942)

- Born: September 27, 1942 (age 84); Kansas City, Missouri, U.S.
- Education: Bethel College
- Occupation: Author
- Spouse: Trancle Byrd

Verda Byrd is an American author. She is best known for identifying as African-American until discovering at the age of 70 that her birth parents were white.

== Life and career ==
=== Early life ===
Byrd was born on September 27, 1942, in Kansas City, Missouri as Jeanette Beagle to two white American parents: Daisy and Earl Beagle. In 1943, her biological father suffered an accident and Byrd along with her other siblings were placed in a children's home. Despite eventually taking back the rest of her children, Byrd remained and was adopted by an African-American couple: Edwinna and Ray Wagner. Byrd's name was changed to "Verda Ann Wagner". Byrd's adoptive parents never told her about her race and raised her as an African-American woman. According to Byrd, she was never questioned about her race as she resembled her adoptive mother. At the age of 10, she was told by her mother that she was adopted, but the rest of her background remained hidden. She attended a white school and claims her family did not face much discrimination aside from her adoptive father getting reduced pay. Byrd was friends with Linda Brown.

=== Adulthood ===
Byrd moved to St. Paul, Minnesota where her aunt and uncle lived at the age of 21. She believes this allowed her to "live the black experience" as she had black boyfriends, attended black churches and attended black social clubs. She also became more aware about black history.

Byrd married Trancle Byrd, an African-American man, who served in the Air Force. When they first met, he assumed Byrd was white, before she convinced him that she was in fact black. In the 1970s Byrd experienced her first perceived discrimination while dining at Denny's, recounting that the staff seated other patrons first and that she and her husband were told to show their ID. They were told to be seated on the second floor, despite there not being a second floor, alluding to the second floor of the local jailhouse. The couple have a daughter and they currently live in Texas.

=== Discovery of her birth family ===
When Byrd's mother died, Byrd uncovered an adoption document with her birth name. However, Byrd disregarded it at the time. In 2013, at the age of 70, Byrd reexamined these documents with the help of a researcher she hired. She learned that she had ten siblings (with only four of those still being alive), and that her biological parents were white. When reflecting on her identity, Byrd states that she is a "beautiful black woman" and has checked white, black, and other on paperwork. She elaborates that "I was born white, but my whole life, I've lived the black experience.

At the age of 71, Byrd reunited with two of her sisters: Sybil Panko and Kathryn Gutierrez Rouillard. She met another sister at a later point in time. However, Byrd has stated that she had a falling out with her sisters after Panko used the n-word. In 2016, Panko died and a request was left for Byrd to not attend her funeral.

=== 70 Years of Blackness ===
In 2017, Byrd published a book "70 Years of Blackness" describing her experience being raised as an African-American woman. Byrd later adapted this into a documentary of the same name, released in 2019. The film received eight awards and was first shown at the San Antonio Film Festival. Byrd helped establish the "70 Years of Blackness Scholarship Program".
