= Shaughnessy v. Pedreiro =

- Supreme Court of the United States

Argued March 31, 1955 Decided April 25, 1955
- Full case name: Edward J. Shaughnessy, District Director of Immigration and Naturalization for the District of New York v. Mampriel Sequeira Pedreiro
- Citations: 349 U.S. 48 (more) 75 S. Ct. 591; 99 L. Ed. 868
- Argument: Oral argument

Case history
- Prior: Judgment for Pedreiro, 222 F.2d 678 (2d Cir. 1955), affirmed.

Holding
- The Immigration and Nationality Act of 1952 did not limit the judicial review provisions of the Administrative Procedure Act.

Court membership
- Chief Justice Earl Warren Associate Justices Hugo Black · Stanley F. Reed; Felix Frankfurter · William O. Douglas; Harold H. Burton · Tom C. Clark; Sherman Minton · John M. Harlan II

Case opinions
- Majority: Black, joined by Warren, Frankfurter, Douglas, Clark, Harlan
- Dissent: Minton, joined by Reed, Burton

Laws applied
- Administrative Procedure Act; Immigration and Nationality Act of 1952

Shaughnessy v. Pedreiro, 349 U.S. 48 (1955), is a decision of the Supreme Court of the United States holding that the Immigration and Nationality Act of 1952 (INA), except where otherwise precluded by statute or common law, permits actions brought under the Administrative Procedure Act (APA). Prior to Pedreiro, habeas corpus was the main means of judicial review in United States immigration and nationality law.

== Background ==
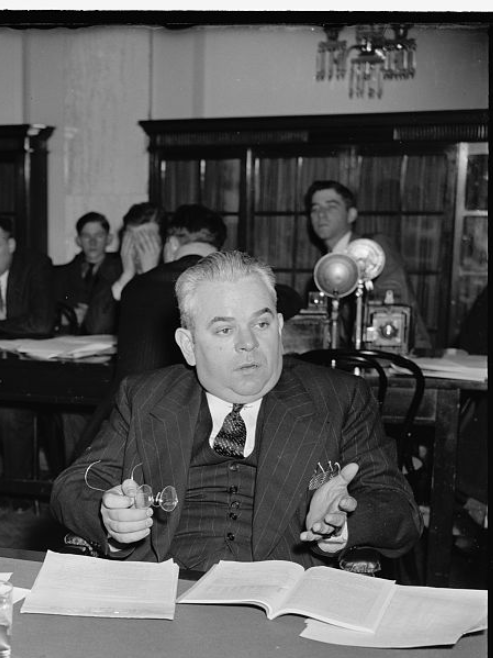
District Director Shaughnessy, c. 1939

Before Shaughnessy v. Pedreiro, the writ of habeas corpus was the sole and exclusive process for judicial review of deportation. Because the writ concerns the legality of detention, there was often no means to seek judicial review of administrative regulations or policies surrounding immigration and naturalization.

Mampriel Pedreiro sought judicial review of a deportation order in the District Court, where he alleged due process claims. The District Court dismissed the petition, stating that an indispensable party was not joined, but was reversed by the Court of Appeals for the Second Circuit, which held that the Administrative Procedure Act allowed judicial review of deportation orders. In another case, the First Circuit had held that judicial review of deportation was available by habeas corpus only. The Supreme Court granted certiorari to resolve the circuit split.

== Supreme Court ==
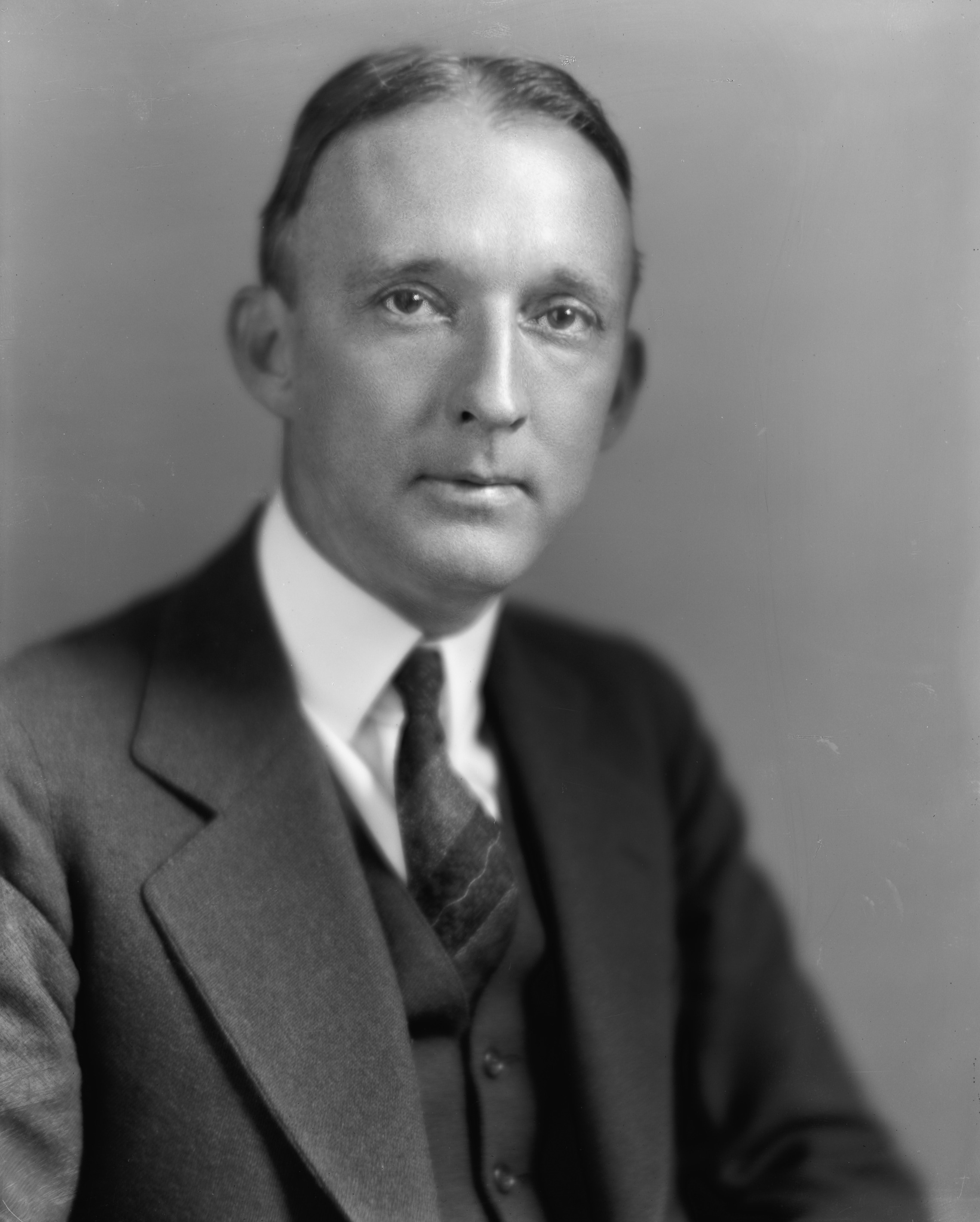
Justice Hugo Black delivered the opinion of the court.

Shaughnessy v. Pedreiro held that the Immigration and Nationality Act of 1952 (INA) did not preclude relief under the APA. The court explained that the APA's judicial review provisions continued to apply unless a later law expressly precluded them, and found that the INA did not do so.

The court also held that the Commissioner of Immigration and Naturalization was not an indispensable party to an action challenging a deportation order. Finding that a requirement to sue the Commissioner in Washington D.C. was inconsistent with the APA policy of facilitating judicial review, Justice Hugo Black delivered the opinion of the court to the effect that "the Government's defense can be adequately presented by the District Director who is under the supervision of the Commissioner."

== Subsequent developments ==
Shaughnessy v. Pedreiro established that the Administrative Procedure Act provided an alternative means of judicial review of deportation orders in addition to habeas corpus. Congress subsequently replaced district court APA review of deportation orders under the Immigration and Nationality Act with review in the courts of appeals as the "sole and exclusive" procedure.

The relationship between APA review and habeas corpus later became relevant to the interpretation of § 704 of the APA, which makes final agency action reviewable when there is "no other adequate remedy" in court. In Bowen v. Massachusetts (1988), the Supreme Court explained that this provision was intended to prevent the APA's general grant of judicial review from duplicating specialized statutory review procedures, not to restrict the APA's broader purpose of providing judicial review of agency action. The court cited Pedreiro in stating that a restrictive interpretation of § 704 would run counter to the APA's purpose of removing obstacles to judicial review.

Habeas exclusivity resurfaced in litigation over removals under the Alien Enemies Act (AEA) during the Trump administration. In Trump v. J.G.G. (2025), the Supreme Court held that judicial review under the AEA was available only through writ of habeas corpus. Dissenting from the majority in Trump v. J.G.G., Justice Sonia Sotomayor cited Pedreiro to illustrate that habeas exclusivity had not historically precluded judicial review under the APA.
