= Linda Carol Brown =

American activist (1943–2018)

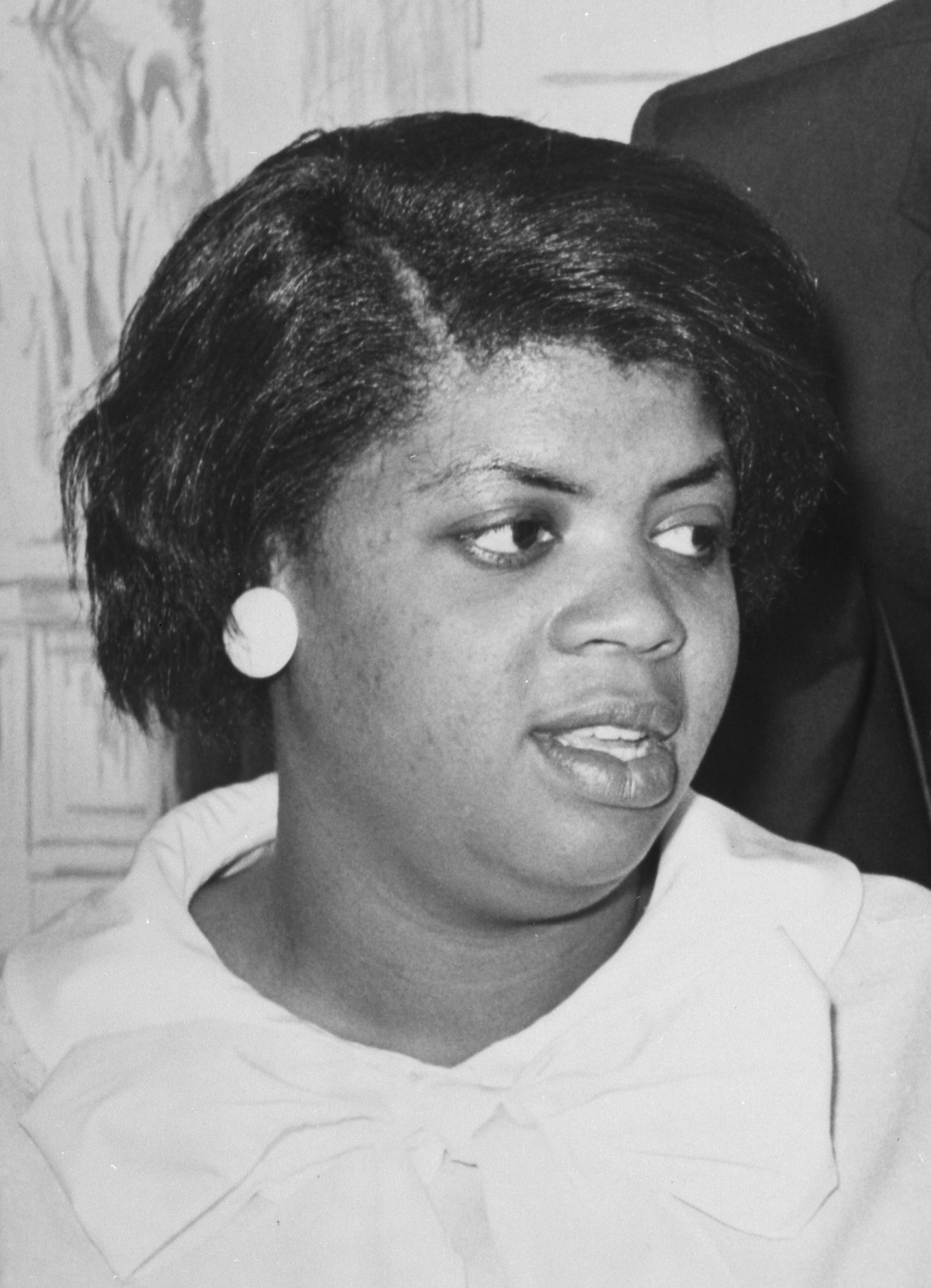
- Brown in 1964
- Born: February 20, 1943; Topeka, Kansas
- Died: March 25, 2018 (aged 75); Topeka, Kansas
- Other names: Linda Carol Smith; Linda Carol Thompson
- Known for: Brown v. Board of Education

Linda Carol Brown (February 20, 1943 – March 25, 2018) was an American campaigner for equality in education. As a school-girl in 1954, Brown became the center of the landmark United States civil rights case Brown v. Board of Education. Brown was in third grade at the time, and sought to enroll at Sumner School in Topeka, Kansas. Her admission was denied based on her race. Her lawsuit against segregation in elementary schools was ultimately successful and the resulting Supreme Court precedent overturned the 'separate but equal' doctrine which had been previously established in Plessy v. Ferguson. Brown became an educator and civil rights advocate.

== Early life and education ==
Linda Brown was born in Topeka, Kansas, on February 20, 1943. She was the oldest of three daughters of Leola and Oliver Brown. Oliver Brown was a welder and pastor. At the direction of the NAACP, Brown's parents attempted to enroll her in nearby Sumner Elementary School and were denied. This allowed Brown's family to join the group of civil rights lawsuits coordinated and supported by the NAACP, which would ultimately be decided in the US Supreme Court case Brown v. Board of Education. The Browns' name was alphabetically first among the families suing the Topeka Board of Education which is why their name was listed first and the case is commonly referred to as Brown vs. the Board of Education. Although her right to attend a non-segregated school was ultimately upheld by the Supreme Court, Brown did not have the opportunity to attend Sumner. By the time the case was decided in 1954, Brown was in junior high school, which was not segregated. Brown was reportedly harassed by journalists after the ruling. Brown later attended Washburn and Kansas State University.

== Involvement in Brown v. Board of Education ==
At the time of the Brown v. Board of Education case, accommodations for black students in public schools were substandard.

Many black children were educated in schools that lacked basic amenities like running water or proper classrooms. As long as black schools and white schools offered the same accommodations, schools could remain segregated under the 1896 Plessy v. Ferguson decision.

In order to force the government to rectify the resource disparities between schools, the NAACP litigated cases around the country in hopes that one case would eventually make it to the Supreme Court. In Topeka, the NAACP found 13 families willing to enroll their children in non segregated schools. Although Linda Brown attended segregated Monroe Elementary, which was more than a mile away from her home, Sumner Elementary was six blocks from her house. After she was denied admission to Sumner, her parents were able to join the NAACP's class action lawsuit.

Despite the fact that Sumner was a few blocks from their home, the Browns did not actually want to send their child to Sumner. In fact, Brown's mother attended Monroe and she loved the teachers and environment at Monroe. At the time, talented, college educated black Americans could not easily enter many fields because of racial barriers. Many of them turned to teaching in predominantly black schools. Because of the calibre of teachers at Monroe, the Browns were very pleased with the school. Ultimately they changed their minds because in principle, if they did not like Monroe, they wanted to have the option to send Linda to Sumner.

At trial, the United States District Court of Kansas found “the educational qualifications of the teachers in the colored schools [were] equal to those in the white schools [and] . . . that the prescribed courses of study [were] identical in all of the Topeka schools . . . [and while] colored children in many instances [were] required to travel much greater distances than they would be required to travel could they attend a white school, . . . the school district transport[ed] colored children to and from school free of charge. No such service [was] furnished to white children.” The NAACP appealed the decision of the U. S. District Court, and the case was heard by the U. S. Supreme Court, which overturned the decision and found that separate but equal approaches were unconstitutional, violating both the 5th Amendment and the 14th Amendment to the Constitution.

== Career and family ==
Throughout her life, Brown continued her advocacy for equal access to education in Kansas. Brown worked as a Head Start teacher and a program associate in the Brown Foundation. She was a public speaker and an education consultant. She divorced her first husband, Charles D. Smith. Her second husband, Leonard Buckner, died. Her third husband was William Thompson, who also preceded her in death. She had two children, Charles and Kimberley, from her first marriage. She is also survived by her grandsons, C. Andrew Smith III, Donnell Smith, and Lawrence Smith.

In 1979, with her own children attending Topeka schools, Brown reopened her case against the Kansas Board of Education, arguing that segregation continued. The appeals court ruled in her favor in 1993.

== Legacy ==
In addition to her lifelong advocacy in law and education, Linda Brown's legacy includes the declaration of historic landmark status for both Sumner Elementary, the nearby whites-only school she sought to attend alongside her neighbors, and the more distant, blacks-only school Monroe Elementary, which she did attend. She is widely considered a symbol of the African-American legacy. In 1992, Monroe was declared a national historic site.

== Death ==
Brown died in her longtime hometown of Topeka on March 25, 2018. She was 75. Although her family did not comment, Kansas Governor Jeff Colyer paid tribute to Brown by Tweet: "Sixty-four years ago a young girl from Topeka brought a case that ended segregation in public schools in America. Linda Brown's life reminds us that sometimes the most unlikely people can have an incredible impact and that by serving our community we can truly change the world."
