= Zelma Henderson =

American activist (1920–2008)

- Born: Zelma Cleota Hurst; February 29, 1920; Colby, Kansas, U.S.
- Died: May 20, 2008 (aged 88); Topeka, Kansas, U.S.
- Occupation: Activist
- Known for: Last surviving plaintiff in Brown v. Board of Education
- Spouse: Andrew Henderson (m. 1943; died 1971)
- Children: 2

Zelma Henderson (February 29, 1920 – May 20, 2008) was the last surviving plaintiff in the 1954 landmark federal school desegregation case, Brown v. Board of Education. The case outlawed segregation nationwide in all of the United States' public schools. The ruling served as a harbinger of the American Civil Rights Movement and paved the way for the Civil Rights Act of 1964, which outlawed segregation in all public facilities.

== Early life ==
Henderson was born as Zelma Cleota Hurst in Colby, Kansas, on February 29, 1920. Her family, the Hursts, were one of only two African American families living in Colby at the time. Her parents grew wheat and raised cattle for a living. The family moved to Oakley, Kansas, when she was still young.

Kansas state law at the time permitted that elementary schools in towns with a population of 15,000 or more could be racially segregated. However, the law did not apply to either Colby or Oakley, since both towns had populations of under 15,000 people. As a result, Henderson attended integrated elementary schools in both towns alongside both black and white children. The law did not apply to Kansas middle schools or high schools, which were integrated throughout the state.

== Brown v. Board of Education ==
Hurst encountered much more blatant discrimination and segregation when she moved to the city of Topeka, Kansas, in 1940. She studied to become a cosmetologist at a segregated school, the Kansas Vocational School. She was known to be a very good typist, but could not find a clerical position in the city due to her race. She was instead offered domestic work, such as a housekeeper or maid.

Henderson married her husband, Andrew Henderson, in 1943. She opened her own beauty salon within her home soon after her marriage. The Hendersons had two children, Donald Henderson and Vicki Henderson, who were bused to a segregated, all black school on the other side of the city of Topeka. This discrimination angered Henderson, who had been educated in integrated schools as a child. She later told the Boston Globe in an interview, "I knew what integration was and how well it worked and couldn’t understand why we were separated here in Topeka."

Henderson became involved in the legal fight against the city's segregated schools in 1950, when the local Topeka chapter of the National Association for the Advancement of Colored People (NAACP) began preparing for a class action suit against the Topeka public school system. The NAACP asked 13 parents of African American public school students, which included Oliver Brown and 12 women, including Zelma Henderson, to serve as plaintiffs in the case. Henderson quickly agreed. In the case, whose full name was Oliver L. Brown et al. v. the Board of Education of Topeka, Henderson was the last et al. listed on the plaintiff's side of the original case.

The lawsuit, with Henderson as one of the 13 plaintiffs, was first filed in 1951 in the United States District Court in Kansas. The U.S. District Court ruled against the plaintiffs, citing the 1896 "separate but equal" ruling by the United States Supreme Court in Plessy v. Ferguson.

The 1951 ruling was appealed to the United States Supreme Court after it was combined with four similar cases originating from the District of Columbia, Delaware, Virginia and South Carolina under the shortened case name of Brown v. Board of Education. The United States Supreme Court unanimously struck down school segregation in its decision on May 17, 1954. Chief Justice Earl Warren wrote for the unanimous majority decision, "Separate educational facilities are inherently unequal," in agreement with Henderson and the other plaintiff's original suit.

Henderson appeared in numerous events commemorating the decision throughout her life. In a 1994 Dallas Morning News interview, she told the interviewing reporter, "None of us knew that this case would be so important and come to the magnitude it has. What little bit I did, I feel I helped the whole nation."

== Death ==
Zelma Henderson died in Topeka, Kansas, at the age of 88 of pancreatic cancer on May 20, 2008. She was the last survivor of the original Brown v. Board of Education of Topeka case.

She was survived by her son, Donald, five grandchildren and fifteen great-grandchildren. Her husband, Andrew Henderson, died in 1971 and their daughter, Vicki, died in 1984.
