= List of United States Supreme Court cases, volume 349 =

This is a list of all the United States Supreme Court cases from volume 349 of the United States Reports:

Case name	Citation	Date decided
Granville-Smith v. Granville-Smith	349 U.S. 1	1955
Norwood v. Kirkpatrick	349 U.S. 29	1955
Natural Gas Pipeline Company v. Panoma Corporation	349 U.S. 44	1955
Parissi v. Telechron, Inc.	349 U.S. 46	1955
Shaughnessy v. Pedreiro	349 U.S. 48	1955
Regan v. New York	349 U.S. 58	1955
Rice v. Sioux City Memorial Park Cemetery, Inc.	349 U.S. 70	1955
Bell v. United States	349 U.S. 81	1955
Bisso v. Inland Waterways Corporation	349 U.S. 85	1955
The Winding Gulf	349 U.S. 122	1955
United States v. Nielson	349 U.S. 129	1955
In re Murchison	349 U.S. 133	1955
Society for Savings v. Bowers	349 U.S. 143	1955
Quinn v. United States	349 U.S. 155	1955
Emspak v. United States	349 U.S. 190	1955
Bart v. United States	349 U.S. 219	1955
United States v. Olympic Radio and Television, Inc.	349 U.S. 232	1955
Lewyt Corporation v. Commissioner	349 U.S. 237	1955
Maneja v. Waialua Agriculture Company	349 U.S. 254	1955
Shaughnessy v. United States ex rel. Accardi	349 U.S. 280	1955
Brown v. Board of Education	349 U.S. 294	1955
Marcello v. Bonds	349 U.S. 302	1955
Lawlor v. National Screen Service Corporation	349 U.S. 322	1955
Peters v. Hobby	349 U.S. 331	1955
Federal Communications Commission v. Allentown Broadcasting Corporation	349 U.S. 358	1955
Whitehouse v. Illinois Central Railroad Company	349 U.S. 366	1955
Williams v. Georgia	349 U.S. 375	1955
Carroll v. Lanza	349 U.S. 408	1955
Mitchell v. C.W. Vollmer and Company	349 U.S. 427	1955
Federal Power Commission v. Oregon	349 U.S. 435	1955
Ellis v. Dixon	349 U.S. 458	1955
