= McKinley Burnett =

American activist (1897–1968)

McKinley Burnett (January 9, 1897 – July 24, 1968) was an American activist. He played a pivotal role in the landmark Brown v. Board of Education of Topeka school desegregation case as President of the Topeka NAACP by recruiting 13 Topeka families to participate in the court action.

== Early life ==
McKinley Langford Burnett was born in Oskaloosa, Kansas in 1897. In his years of growing up he encountered many acts of discrimination. In school he was not allowed to participate in plays unless he was dancer, in the Army as a soldier he was discriminated against, and as a supply clerk for the Veterans Administration he had many limits because of his skin color. He wanted to do something about this, to end discrimination against African Americans.

In 1948, Burnett became President of the Topeka chapter of the NAACP (National Association for the Advancement of Colored People). His focus as president settled on desegregating public schools in Topeka, Kansas. For two years he held meetings and wrote letters, trying to convince the school board to integrate schools. They kept refusing.

== Brown v. Board of Education ==
In 1950, Burnett took his efforts to the next level. He informed the school board if they did not desegregate the schools, he along with the NAACP would go to court. The school board ignored the threat. So then the NAACP took the Topeka school board to court.

Burnett personally recruited thirteen African American families to attempt enrolling their children in Topeka Public Schools' all-white schools for the fall semester of 1950. All 20 children were denied enrollment. In February, 1951 the NAACP filed a lawsuit. Eleven attempts had been made before to end segregation in Kansas.

Three years after the suit was filed, the Supreme Court reviewed the case. The case was named Brown v. Board of Education. Throughout all the hearings and debates, Burnett was in attendance for it all. Chief Justice Earl Warren delivered the ruling of the Supreme Court: "We conclude that in the field of public education the doctrine of 'separate but equal' has no place. Separate educational facilities are inherently unequal."

McKinley Burnett was quoted as saying, "I say, 'thank God for the Supreme Court.'"

== Later life ==
Burnett continued his duty as the president of the NAACP chapter until 1963. He died on July 24, 1968, aged 71. On October 4, 2001, the Topeka Public Schools Administrative Center was renamed in his honor.
