= Sumner Elementary School =

- Sumner Elementary School and Monroe Elementary School
- U.S. National Register of Historic Places
- U.S. National Historic Landmark
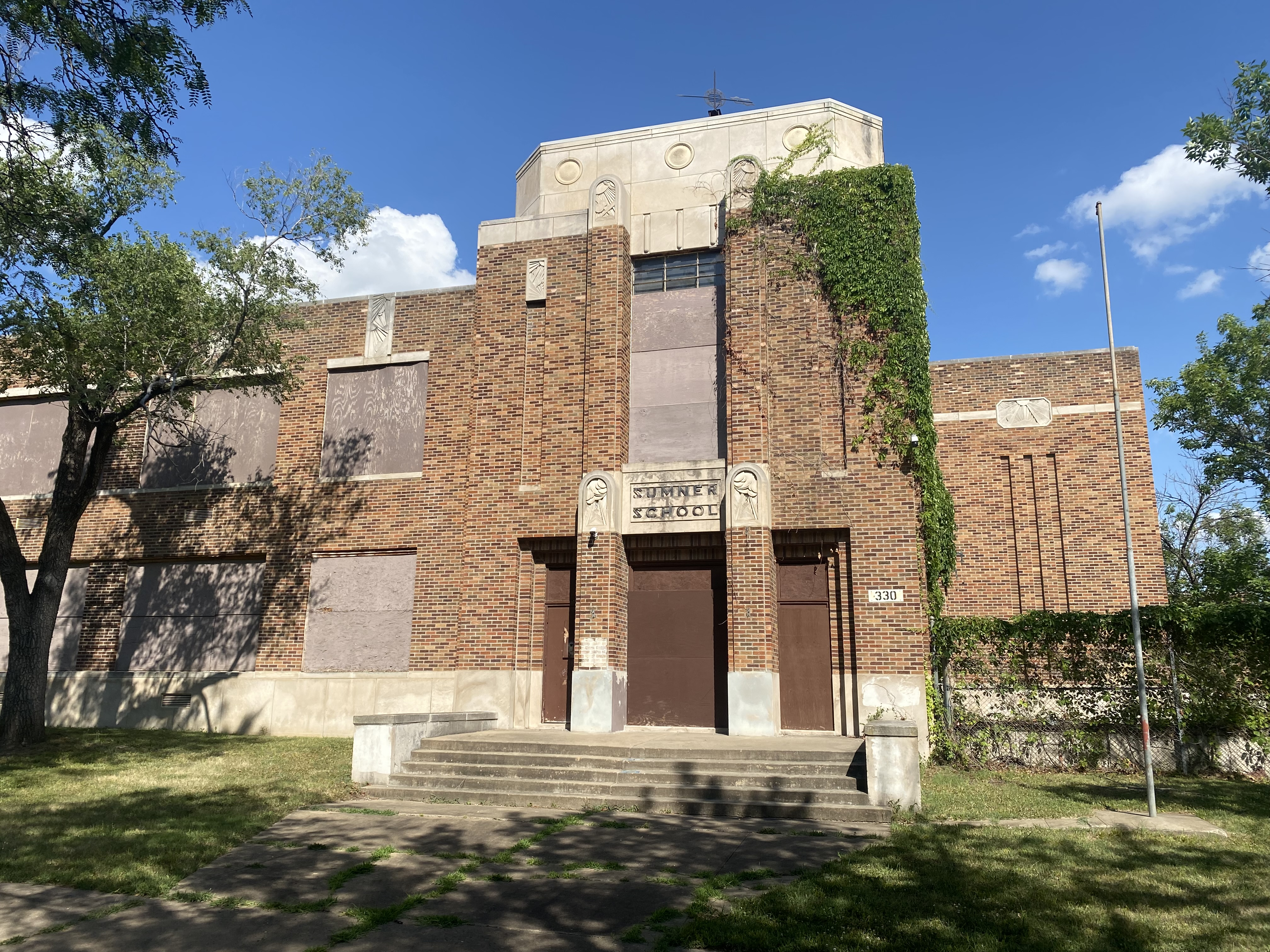
- Sumner Elementary School (2025)

- Location within Kansas Location within the United States
- Location: Topeka, Kansas
- Coordinates: 39°3′29″N 95°40′56″W
- Built: 1936
- Architect: Thomas W. Williamson
- Architectural style: Renaissance, Art Deco
- NRHP reference No.: 87001283
- Added to NRHP: May 4, 1987

The Sumner Elementary School in Topeka, Kansas was involved in the Brown v. Board of Education of Topeka case in 1954. Linda Brown's attempted enrollment to the Sumner School was rejected by the Topeka Board of Education, thus forcing her to attend the all-black Monroe School, which was farther away from her home. Oliver Brown, Linda's father, then joined the class action lawsuit against the Topeka Board of Education that was eventually heard before the Supreme Court.

The Sumner Elementary School is currently a National Historic Landmark listed with the United States Department of the Interior. It was constructed in 1936 as a part of the Federal Emergency Administration of Public Works, a New Deal program. The school was designed in the Art Deco style by Thomas W. Williamson, and has an unusual amount of stone detailing. Because of the quality of the original construction, it retains many of its original features, including light and bathroom fixtures, clocks, carved woodwork and a marble-rimmed fireplace in the kindergarten.

Monroe Elementary School, the school that Linda Brown had been attending, closed in 1975 and was held privately for a number of years before being purchased in 1991 by The Trust for Public Land and added to Sumner's listing on the National Register. Because Sumner was still in use at the time for classes and Monroe was not, Monroe was selected on October 26, 1992 to house the Brown v. Board of Education National Historic Site, the official commemorative location operated for the public by the National Park Service.

The school closed in 1996. It was one of eight schools closed as part of a local desegregation plan to satisfy the original Brown case which was re-opened in the 1980s and not closed until 1999. The building was initially purchased by the Topeka & Shawnee County Public Library, which used it as a storage facility. The City of Topeka purchased the building from the library in 2002, hoping to rehabilitate it, but city was unable to allocate the necessary funds. The city then tried to sell the property, but found no buyers; it even considered demolishing the building, which had fallen into serious neglect and had suffered vandalism. As a consequence, in May 2008, The National Trust for Historic Preservation listed the building on their list of America's Most Endangered Places.

The city chose to auction the building to the public in January 2009. Hearing of the sale and recognizing the significance to the Civil Rights Movement, Bishop W. R. Portee, Pastor of Southside Christian Palace Church based in Los Angeles, purchased the building using the umbrella organization True Foundation World Outreach Ministries in April 2009 for $89,000. The organization plans to renovate the building and open it to the public as a community center and human rights memorial. The estimated renovation costs are $7 million.
