= Lucinda Todd =

American teacher and education activist (1903–1996)

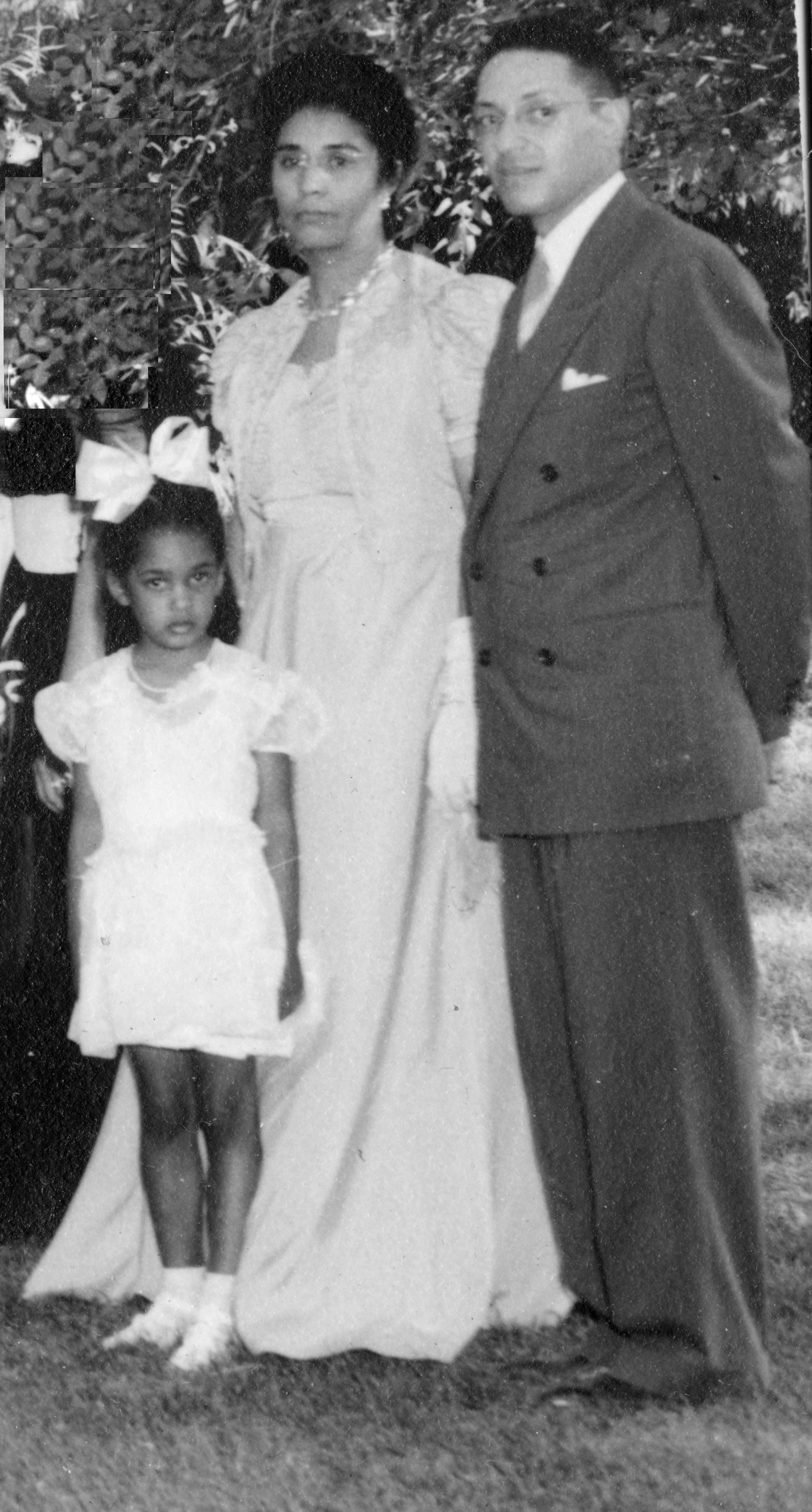
Todd with her family in 1946

Lucinda Todd (1903 – July 17, 1996) was an African-American teacher and education activist.

== Biography ==
Todd was born in 1903 in Litchfield, Kansas, a small coal mining town near Pittsburg, Kansas. She was one of 13 children born to Charles Wilson and his wife Estelle Slaughter Wilson. Lucinda started her teaching career in 1928 after graduating from what is now Pittsburg State University with a degree in education. She married Alvin Todd in 1935 and they moved to Topeka, Kansas. As a married woman, she was not permitted to teach so she was forced to quit her job. While raising her daughter, Nancy, she became active in the local chapter of the NAACP and was elected Secretary in 1948. When Nancy entered grade school, Lucinda wanted her to have music lessons, but she later learned that music was only taught at the white schools. When she asked the school board why, they told her that colored children weren't interested in learning music and couldn't afford the instruments. She spoke out against this policy and the next year, there was music in the black schools.

As Lucinda became more outspoken about the conditions of the schools for African-American children, other teachers grew afraid of losing their jobs because of their association with Lucinda. Whenever some of her teacher friends visited her home, she had to pull the shades down. At the time, African-American teachers in Topeka endured ruthless work conditions at the hand of a white segregationist superintendent, who hired a black man to enforce segregation throughout the school system. This school administration evaluated black teachers 50% for their skills and 50% for "attitude" and the wrong "attitude" could get them fired. In August 1950 Lucinda wrote a letter to Walter Francis White, Executive Secretary of the national NAACP, requesting legal support. In the letter she stated, "Our situation has become so unbearable that the local branch has decided to test the permissible law which we have here in Kansas." Mr. White referred Lucinda's request to the NAACP's legal department. Together with attorneys in Topeka, the NAACP outlined a series of strategies that aligned the desegregation movement with Lucinda's push for equitable access to educational opportunities. Lucinda Wilson Todd, and 13 other black parents became the petitioners in the class action suit to bring about integration in Topeka's elementary schools, Brown v. Board of Education. On May 17, 1954, the U.S. Supreme Court ruled in favor of the group of parents to integrate the elementary school system of Topeka. The decision to proceed with what was to become Oliver Brown et al. v. the Topeka Board of Education was made around Lucinda Todd's dining room table. In spite of the fact that she was a teacher in the school district and faced reprisals for her actions, she immediately volunteered on behalf of her daughter Nancy, as the first Topeka plaintiff.

Todd died on July 17, 1996, in Topeka.
