= Sokoni Karanja =

American child development expert and CEO

- Born: January 7, 1940 (age 86); Topeka, Kansas, U.S.
- Education: Washburn University; University of Denver; University of Cincinnati; Brandeis University; Clark Atlanta University
- Scientific career
- Fields: Child development
- Workplaces: Brandeis University

Sokoni Tacuma Karanja (Lathan Johnson) (born January 7, 1940, in Topeka, Kansas) is a child development expert, and President and CEO of the Center for New Horizons.

He graduated from Topeka High School in 1958, from Washburn University with a B.A. in 1961, from the University of Denver with a master's degree in psychology, from Atlanta University with a master's degree in social work, from the University of Cincinnati with a master's degree in community planning, and from Brandeis University with a Ph.D. degree in urban policy, where he was assistant dean of students, in 1971.

He was on the board of Woods Fund of Chicago. In 2004, he was arrested by police, but the charges were dismissed. He is married to professor Ayana Karanja; they have five children.

== Awards ==
- 1993 MacArthur Fellows Program
