= Peter Lawrence (pirate) =

Dutch pirate and privateer (fl. 1693–1705)

Peter Lawrence (fl. 1693–1705, real name Pieter Laurens) was a Dutch pirate and privateer active off New England and Newfoundland, and in the Caribbean. His and other pirates’ dealings with Rhode Island’s governors nearly led to the colony losing its charter.

== History ==
Pieter Laurens took commissions from English officials in the American colonies under the name Peter Lawrence, which is how his name is recorded in most official documents. He was commissioned to sail his brigantine Charles as a privateer against the French in 1693 by Rhode Island Governor Easton. Deputy Governor John Greene renewed his commission the following year, when he raided French fishing fleets off Newfoundland. He continued this pattern for the duration of King William's War.

With the outbreak of Queen Anne's War in 1702 he again sailed against the French, returning a few captured vessels to Boston after receiving a commission from Massachusetts Governor Joseph Dudley. Later that year he resupplied in Rhode Island before sailing to the Caribbean. Near Cuba he worked with fellow privateers John Blew and Jeremiah Burrows to capture the rich Spanish ship Jesu􏰂s Nazareno y Nuestra Senora de la Escalera.

Lawrence’s ship Charles was owned by investors from Boston, and his commission was from Governor Dudley. Instead the privateers put into Rhode Island and had the Spanish ship condemned by Governor Samuel Cranston, where they would receive a more favorable share of the prize money. This cheated Dudley and the Charles’ owners out of their share, deepening a rift between Dudley and Cranston. Dudley also found that Lawrence had earlier robbed and sunk an English ship off South Carolina, violating his commission; Cranston sheltered Lawrence, preventing Dudley from arresting him.

The last record of Lawrence's activities is in May 1704, when he advertised for recruits for a new voyage: “Captain Peter Lawrence is going a-Privateering from Rhode Island in a good sloop, about 60 tons, six guns, and 90 men for Canada, and any gentlemen or sailors that are disposed to go, shall be kindly entertained.”

Cranston defended to the Council of Trade and Plantations in England the privateering commissions granted by Easton, Greene, himself, and others. He was questioned by New York's Governor Bellomont about their commissions to Lawrence, William May, Richard Want, Thomas Tew, Joseph Faro, and others. In 1705 English officials charged Cranston's government with serving as “a receptacle of pirates,” though Cranston remained popular in the state and was re-elected many times afterward.

== See also ==
- Thomas Larimore – Lawrence employed Dr. Francis Ghatman as ship's surgeon aboard the Charles; Ghatman would later sail with (and testify against) privateer turned pirate Thomas Larimore.
