= Allen W. Clark =

American journalist and businessman (1867–1931)

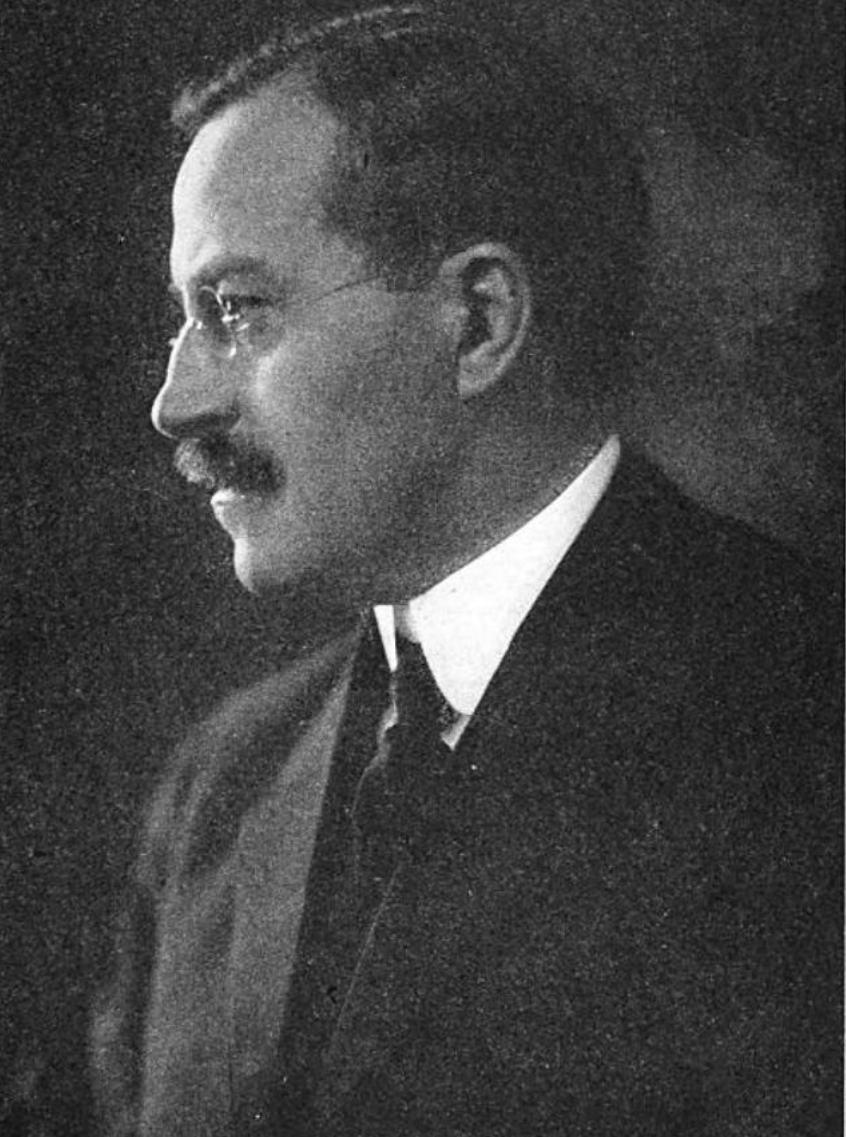
Clark in a 1921 publication

Allen W. Clark (December 28, 1867 – March 8, 1931) was an American journalist and businessman.

== Biography ==
Clark was born on December 28, 1867, near Topeka, Kansas, to Baptist pastor W. A. Clark, and Jane Clark (née Jordan). He attended Tennessee and Arkansas public schools and studied at Franklin College. He worked for The Morning Report in Chico, California, from 1888, as well as an employee for Arkansas Baptist Publishing Company in Little Rock, Morning Report in South Bend, Indiana, and New Era in Greensburg, Indiana, from 1901.

Clark founded The American Painter and Decorator and the American Paint Journal Company. He was president of the Southwestern Trade Press Association, as well as a member of the National Press Club, the Chemists and Drug and Chemical Clubs of New York, and the University Club of St. Louis; he was also a member of the War Trade Board during World War I.

On 9 June 1889, Clark married Florence Shuh, who he had four children with. He died on March 8, 1931, aged 63, in a hospital in St. Louis.
