= Peter Max Lawrence =

American film director

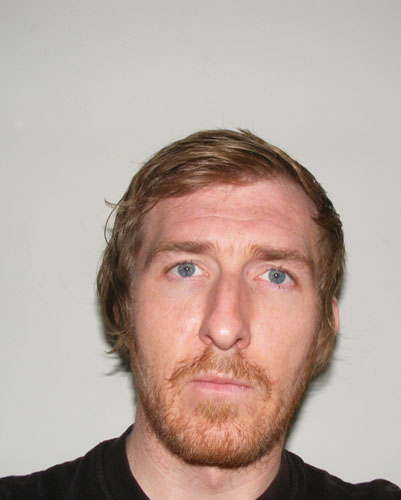
- Lawrence (2007)
- Born: March 19, 1977 (age 49); Topeka, Kansas, U.S.
- Education: San Francisco Art Institute
- Occupations: Artist, film director
- Website: petermaxlawrence.com

Peter Max Lawrence (born March 19, 1977, in Topeka, Kansas) is a multidisciplinary contemporary artist, as well as performance artist, curator, filmmaker, and film director. He is known to work in painting, video installation, sculpture, photography and drawing. Lawrence has had art exhibitions in galleries throughout the United States and Europe. He has lived in San Francisco and Kansas City, Missouri.

== Early life ==
Lawrence was born in Topeka, Kansas in 1977, and was adopted soon thereafter by Barbra and Dennis Lawrence. He was raised in Western Wyandotte County in Kansas where he attended St. Patricks, Bishop Ward and Kansas City Kansas Community College. He has identified as being gay, which has influenced his art.

Lawrence received his B.F.A. in 2009 in new genres from the San Francisco Art Institute (SFAI). He received the CAAC fellowship in 1999 and the Garber Grant in 2001. While he was a student, he worked under artist Ian McDonald at a De Young museum artist residency and they produced a film for the Truly CA series.

He relocated to Kansas City, Missouri, and seven years later to San Francisco to take up performance, film and video art.

He lived and worked in California for 15 years.

== Career ==
His discography includes such music as Banana Blues, On Your Own Time, Queer from Kansas, and The Media.

One of his early showings of his art was The Man Who Was Too Loud (2001) at the Kansas City, Kansas, Public Library, about coming out publicly as gay. It was followed later in 2001, by a showing in Montreal. Lawrence also was in the art exhibitions, The Indelible Sulk (2013) a solo art installation at Mission: Comics and Art in San Francisco; Ungodly: The Spiritual Medium (2020) a group exhibition at Oregon Contemporary gallery in Portland, Oregon; and At War (2012) with Truong Tran at SOMArts in San Francisco (as part of a curatorial residency).. Lawrence was the third artist in residence for Kalup Linzy's project Queen Rose Art House in tandem with Tulsa Artist Fellowship (2023)

=== Collaborations ===
Paper Waster Press was a collective project with Lawrence, he first engaged with Amy Whitehead, and later with Nico Peck; the duos collaborations continued until 2011. Lawrence was part of, The Cries of San Francisco: Saturday Market #2 (2011), a group project by Allison Smith at Southern Exposure, San Francisco, California. Lawrence was part of the art event, Breaking My Spell (2011) at Reykjavik Culture Night, Reykjavik, Iceland; working with fellow SFAI students Michelle Morby, Kirk Wilder, Jenalee Harmon, and Melkorka Helgadottir.

=== Performances ===
Live performances include collaborations and a trilogy of performances in Athens, Greece, that were the cumulative work of an extended residency at Sub Rosa Space including Beyond Say: An American in Athens (2018), The Umpire Strikes Back (2018), Return of the Yeti (2018). Lawrence performed, I Miss America (2018) at CHEAPArt gallery in Athens.

Lawrence performed Whimper (2014), The Stud bar in San Francisco. He performed at 4WAVES: 40 Performances for the Hole (2019) in the group event in San Francisco.

== Filmography ==
Lawrence has also directed music videos such as Krystle Warren's I've Seen Days and On that First Day of Autumn; Carletta Sue Kay's, The Lady and the Creature From the Black Lagoon, For the Birds, and Just Another Beautiful Boy; Pookie and the Poodlez's, go go away from me; and The Centauros featuring AL-V, Calavera in Barcelona, Spain.

- Glitter (2005)
- Negative Space/Jane Sommerhauser (2006)
- Poor Pandora (Spring 2008)
- Something to Trade (2008)
- Queer in Kansas (2008), an autobiographical film.
- Warholics
- De Young (2017), an experimental documentary as part of the Truly CA series,

== Curator ==
- 2019 – THE ONE
- 2015 – Lid Off Film Festival, alongside the Grassroots Art Center, Lucas Area Community Theater, Lucas, Kansas
- 2014 – The News with Kolmel WithLove at SOMArts, San Francisco, California
