= Brown v. Board of Education =

Landmark 1954 U.S. Supreme Court decision

- Supreme Court of the United States

Argued December 9, 1952 Reargued December 8, 1953 Decided May 17, 1954
- Full case name: Oliver Brown, et al. v. Board of Education of Topeka, et al.
- Citations: 347 U.S. 483 (more) 74 S. Ct. 686; 98 L. Ed. 873; 1954 U.S. LEXIS 2094; 53 Ohio Op. 326; 38 A.L.R.2d 1180
- Decision: Opinion

Case history
- Prior: Judgment for defendants, 98 F. Supp. 797 (D. Kan. 1951); probable jurisdiction noted, 344 U.S. 1 (1952).
- Subsequent: Judgment on relief, 349 U.S. 294 (1955) (Brown II); on remand, 139 F. Supp. 468 (D. Kan. 1955); motion to intervene granted, 84 F.R.D. 383 (D. Kan. 1979); judgment for defendants, 671 F. Supp. 1290 (D. Kan. 1987); reversed, 892 F.2d 851 (10th Cir. 1989); vacated, 503 U.S. 978 (1992) (Brown III); judgment reinstated, 978 F.2d 585 (10th Cir. 1992); judgment for defendants, 56 F. Supp. 2d 1212 (D. Kan. 1999)

Holding
- Segregation of students in public schools violates the Equal Protection Clause of the Fourteenth Amendment, because separate facilities are inherently unequal. District Court of Kansas reversed.

Court membership
- Chief Justice Earl Warren Associate Justices Hugo Black · Stanley F. Reed; Felix Frankfurter · William O. Douglas; Robert H. Jackson · Harold H. Burton; Tom C. Clark · Sherman Minton

Case opinion
- Majority: Warren, joined by a unanimous court

Laws applied
- U.S. Const. amend. XIV
- This case overturned a previous ruling or rulings
- Plessy v. Ferguson (1896) (in part); Cumming v. Richmond County Board of Education (1899); Berea College v. Kentucky (1908)

Brown v. Board of Education of Topeka, 347 U.S. 483 (1954), is a landmark decision of the United States Supreme Court that ruled that U.S. state laws establishing racial segregation in public schools violate the Equal Protection Clause of the Fourteenth Amendment, even if the segregated facilities are presumed to be equal in quality. The decision partially overruled the Court's infamous 1896 decision Plessy v. Ferguson, (Note: The Supreme Court has never explicitly overruled Plessy v. Ferguson in its entirety, although Brown and a series of later Supreme Court decisions have severely weakened Plessy to the point that it is usually considered de facto overruled.) which had ruled that racial segregation laws were constitutional as long as the facilities for each race were equal, a doctrine that had come to be known as "separate but equal", and was rejected in Brown based on the arguement that segregated facilities were inherently unequal. The Court's unanimous decision in Brown and its related cases paved the way for integration and was a major victory of the civil rights movement, and it became a model for many future impact litigation cases.

The case involved the public school system in Topeka, Kansas. In 1951, it had refused to enroll the daughter of local black resident Oliver Brown at the school closest to her home, instead requiring her to ride a bus to a segregated black school farther away. The Browns and twelve other local black families in similar situations filed a class action lawsuit in U.S. federal court against the Topeka Board of Education, alleging its segregation policy was unconstitutional. A special three-judge court of the U.S. District Court for the District of Kansas heard the case and ruled against them, relying on the precedent of Plessy and its "separate but equal" doctrine. The Browns, represented by NAACP chief counsel Thurgood Marshall, appealed the ruling directly to the Supreme Court, where it was heard with other similar cases from the South. In May 1954, the Court issued a unanimous 9–0 decision in their favor. However, the Court's 14-page opinion did not spell out any specific method for ending racial segregation in schools, and the Court's second decision in Brown II (1955) only ordered states to desegregate "with all deliberate speed".

In the Southern United States, the reaction to Brown among most white people was "noisy and stubborn", especially in the Deep South where racial segregation was deeply entrenched in society. Many Southern governmental and political leaders embraced a plan known as "massive resistance", created by Senator Harry F. Byrd, in order to frustrate attempts to force them to de-segregate their school systems, most notably immortalized by the Little Rock crisis. The Court reaffirmed its ruling in Brown in Cooper v. Aaron, explicitly stating that state officials and legislators had no jurisdiction to nullify its ruling.

== Background ==
Educational segregation in the US prior to Brown. Racial segregation was required throughout the states in the Southern United States (in red). Kansas where Topeka is located allowed a local option for school districts to enforce segregation (blue).

For much of the 60 years preceding the Brown case, race relations in the United States had been dominated by racial segregation. Such state policies had been endorsed by the United States Supreme Court ruling in Plessy v. Ferguson (1896), which held that as long as the separate facilities for separate races were equal, state segregation did not violate the Fourteenth Amendment's Equal Protection Clause ("no State shall ... deny to any person ... the equal protection of the laws"). Racial segregation in education varied widely from the 17 states that required racial segregation to the 16 in which it was prohibited. Beginning in the 1930s, a legal strategy was pursued, led by scholars at Howard University and activists at the NAACP, that sought to undermine states' public education segregation by first focusing on the graduate school setting. This led to success in the cases of Sweatt v. Painter, 339 U.S. 629 (1950) and McLaurin v. Oklahoma State Regents, 339 U.S. 637 (1950), suggesting that racial segregation was inherently unequal (at least in some settings), which paved the way for Brown.

The plaintiffs in Brown asserted that the system of racial separation in all schools, while masquerading as providing separate but equal treatment of both white and black Americans, instead perpetuated inferior accommodations, services, and treatment for black Americans. Brown was influenced by UNESCO's 1950 Statement, signed by a wide variety of internationally renowned scholars, titled The Race Question. This declaration denounced previous attempts at scientifically justifying racism as well as morally condemning racism. Another work that the Supreme Court cited was Gunnar Myrdal's An American Dilemma: The Negro Problem and Modern Democracy (1944). Myrdal had been a signatory of the UNESCO declaration.

The United States and the Soviet Union were both at the height of the Cold War during this time, and U.S. officials, including Supreme Court justices, were highly aware of the harm that segregation and racism were doing to America's international image. When Justice William O. Douglas traveled to India in 1950, the first question he was asked was, "Why does America tolerate the lynching of Negroes?" Douglas later wrote that he had learned from his travels that "the attitude of the United States toward its colored minorities is a powerful factor in our relations with India." Chief Justice Earl Warren, nominated to the Supreme Court by President Dwight D. Eisenhower, echoed Douglas's concerns in a 1954 speech to the American Bar Association, proclaiming that "Our American system like all others is on trial both at home and abroad, ... the extent to which we maintain the spirit of our constitution with its Bill of Rights, will in the long run do more to make it both secure and the object of adulation than the number of hydrogen bombs we stockpile."

== District court case ==
=== Filing and arguments ===
In 1951, a class-action lawsuit was filed against the Board of Education of the City of Topeka, Kansas, in the United States District Court for the District of Kansas. The plaintiffs were thirteen Topeka parents on behalf of their 20 children.

The suit called for the school district to reverse its policy of racial segregation. The Topeka Board of Education operated separate elementary schools due to an 1879 Kansas law, which permitted (but did not require) districts to maintain separate elementary school facilities for black and white students in 12 communities with populations over 15,000. The plaintiffs had been recruited by the leadership of the Topeka NAACP. As directed by the NAACP leadership, the parents each attempted to enroll their children in the closest neighborhood school in the fall of 1951. They were each refused enrollment and redirected to the segregated schools.

Notable among the Topeka NAACP leaders were the chairman McKinley Burnett; Charles Scott, one of three serving as legal counsel for the chapter; and Lucinda Todd. Prompted by Todd, Katherine Carper Sawyer was the only student plaintiff to testify on her challenges reaching the segregated Buchanan Elementary School in Topeka, Kansas. Following the Supreme Court's decision, she was among the Black students to integrate Capper Junior High and Topeka High School.

The named African-American plaintiff, Oliver Brown, was a parent, a welder in the shops of the Santa Fe Railroad, as well as an assistant pastor at his local church. He was convinced to join the lawsuit by a childhood friend, Charles Scott. Brown's daughter Linda Carol Brown, a third grader, had to walk six blocks to her school bus stop to ride to Monroe Elementary, her segregated black school 1 mi (1.6 km) away, while Sumner Elementary, a white school, was seven blocks from her house.

Brown was chosen as the named plaintiff since the NAACP felt a male representative would be better received by the Supreme Court. The 13 plaintiffs were Oliver Brown, Darlene Brown, Lena Carper, Sadie Emmanuel, Marguerite Emerson, Shirley Fleming, Zelma Henderson, Shirley Hodison, Maude Lawton, Alma Lewis, Iona Richardson, Vivian Scales, and Lucinda Todd. Zelma Henderson was the last surviving plaintiff and died in Topeka on May 20, 2008, at age 88.

=== District court opinion ===
The District Court ruled in favor of the Board of Education, citing the U.S. Supreme Court precedent set in Plessy v. Ferguson. Judge Walter Huxman wrote the opinion for the three-judge District Court panel, including nine "findings of fact," based on the evidence presented at trial. Although finding number eight stated that segregation in public education has a detrimental effect on negro children, the court denied relief on the ground that the negro and white schools in Topeka were substantially equal with respect to buildings, transportation, curricula, and educational qualifications of teachers. This finding would be specifically cited in the subsequent Supreme Court opinion of this case.

== Supreme Court arguments ==
The case titled Brown v. Board of Education as heard before the Supreme Court combined five cases: the original Brown case (appealed from Kansas), Briggs v. Elliott (filed in South Carolina), Davis v. County School Board of Prince Edward County (filed in Virginia), Gebhart v. Belton (filed in Delaware), and Bolling v. Sharpe (filed in Washington, D.C.).

All were NAACP-sponsored cases. The Davis case, the only one of the five to originate with a student protest, began when 16-year-old Barbara Rose Johns organized and led a 450-student walkout of Moton High School in Farmville, Virginia. The Gebhart case was the only one in which a trial court, affirmed by the Delaware Supreme Court, found that school segregation was unlawful; in all the other cases the plaintiffs had lost as the original courts had found segregation to be lawful.

The Kansas case was unique among the group in that there was no contention of gross inferiority of the segregated schools' physical plant, curriculum, or staff. The district court found substantial equality as to all such factors. The lower court, in its opinion, noted that, in Topeka, "the physical facilities, the curricula, courses of study, qualification and quality of teachers, as well as other educational facilities in the two sets of schools [were] comparable." The lower court observed that "colored children in many instances are required to travel much greater distances than they would be required to travel could they attend a white school" but also noted that the school district "transports colored children to and from school free of charge" and that "no such service [was] provided to white children." In the Delaware case the district court judge ordered that black students be admitted to the white high school due to the substantial harm of segregation and the differences that made the separate schools unequal.

Under the leadership of Walter Reuther, the United Auto Workers donated $75,000 to help pay for the NAACP's efforts at the Supreme Court. The NAACP's chief counsel, Thurgood Marshall—who was later appointed to the U.S. Supreme Court in 1967—argued the case before the Supreme Court for the plaintiffs. Assistant attorney general Paul Wilson—later distinguished emeritus professor of law at the University of Kansas—conducted the state's defense in his first appellate argument.

In December 1952, the Justice Department filed an amicus curiae ("friend of the court") brief in the case. The brief was unusual in its heavy emphasis on foreign-policy considerations of the Truman administration in a case ostensibly about domestic issues. Of the seven pages covering "the interest of the United States," five focused on the way school segregation hurt the United States in the Cold War competition for the friendship and allegiance of non-white peoples in countries then gaining independence from colonial rule. Attorney General James P. McGranery noted that "the existence of discrimination against minority groups in the United States has an adverse effect upon our relations with other countries. Racial discrimination furnishes grist for the Communist propaganda mills." The brief also quoted a letter by Secretary of State Dean Acheson lamenting that "the United States is under constant attack in the foreign press, over the foreign radio, and in such international bodies as the United Nations because of various practices of discrimination in this country."

British barrister and parliamentarian Anthony Lester has written that "Although the Court's opinion in Brown made no reference to these considerations of foreign policy, there is no doubt that they significantly influenced the decision."

=== Consensus building ===
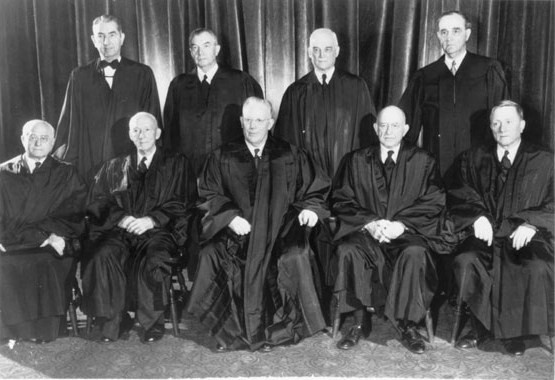
The members of the U.S. Supreme Court that on May 17, 1954, ruled unanimously that racial segregation in public schools is unconstitutional.

In spring 1953, the court heard the case, but was unable to decide the issue and asked to rehear the case in fall 1953, with special attention to whether the Fourteenth Amendment's Equal Protection Clause prohibited the operation of separate public schools for whites and blacks.

Conference notes and draft decisions illustrate the division of opinions among the Supreme Court Justices before their unanimous decision developed. Justices William O. Douglas, Hugo Black, Harold Hitz Burton, and Sherman Minton were predisposed to overturn Plessy. Chief Justice Fred M. Vinson noted that Congress had not adopted desegregation legislation. Justice Stanley F. Reed discussed incomplete cultural assimilation and states' rights, and was inclined to the view that segregation worked to the benefit of the African-American community. Tom C. Clark wrote that "we had led the states on to think segregation is OK and we should let them work it out." Felix Frankfurter and Robert H. Jackson disapproved of segregation, but were also opposed to judicial activism and expressed concerns about the proposed decision's enforceability. Chief Justice Vinson had been a key stumbling block. After Vinson died in September 1953, President Dwight D. Eisenhower appointed Earl Warren as Chief Justice. Warren had supported the integration of Mexican-American students in California school systems following Mendez v. Westminster. However, Eisenhower invited Earl Warren to a White House dinner along with John W. Davis, who was the oral advocate against desegregation in Briggs v. Elliott, where the president told Warren privately: "These [southern whites] are not bad people. All they are concerned about is to see that their sweet little girls are not required to sit in school alongside some big overgrown Negroes." (Note: One source gives Eisenhower's quote as saying "big black bucks" instead of "big overgrown Negroes".) Nevertheless, the Justice Department sided with the African-American plaintiffs.

While all but one justice personally rejected segregation, the judicial restraint faction questioned whether the Constitution gave the court the power to order its end. The activist faction believed the Fourteenth Amendment did give the necessary authority and were pushing to go ahead. Warren, who held only a recess appointment, held his tongue until the Senate confirmed his appointment.

Warren convened a meeting of the justices and presented to them the simple argument that the only reason to sustain segregation was an honest belief in the inferiority of Negroes. Warren further submitted that the court must overrule Plessy to maintain its legitimacy as an institution of liberty, and it must do so unanimously to avoid massive Southern resistance. He began to build a unanimous opinion. Although most justices were immediately convinced, Warren spent some time after this famous speech convincing everyone to sign onto the opinion. Justice Jackson dropped his planned concurrence and Justice Reed, after being reminded by Warren that a lone dissent would only encourage resistance in the South, finally decided to drop his planned dissent. The final decision was unanimous. Warren drafted an initial ruling document and kept circulating and revising it until he had an opinion endorsed by all the members of the Court. Justice Reed, the last holdout, reportedly cried during the reading of the opinion.

== Supreme Court decision ==
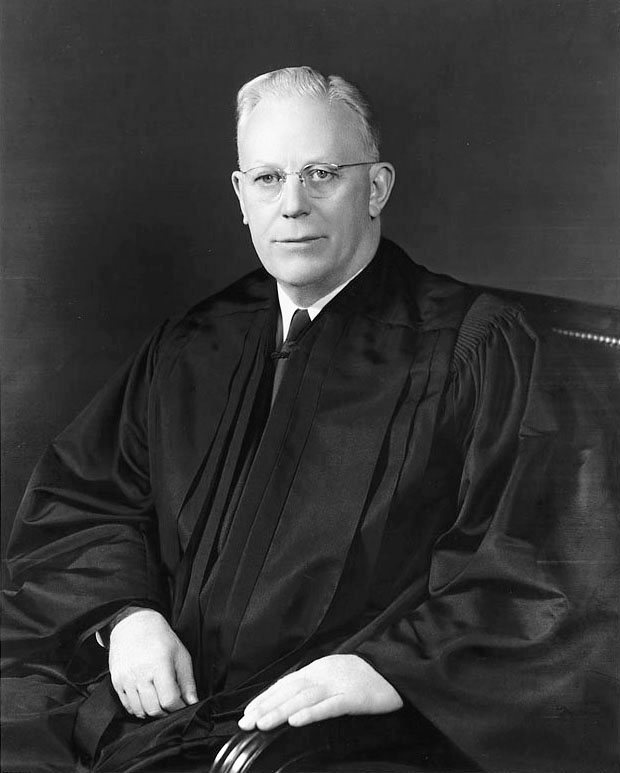
Chief justice Earl Warren, the author of the Supreme Court's unanimous opinion in Brown

On May 17, 1954, the Supreme Court issued a unanimous 9–0 decision in favor of the Brown family and the other plaintiffs. The decision consists of a single opinion written by Chief Justice Earl Warren, which all the justices joined.

The opinion began by discussing whether the Fourteenth Amendment, adopted in 1868, was meant to abolish segregation in public education. The Court said it had been unable to reach a conclusion on that question, even after hearing a second round of oral arguments from the parties' lawyers specifically on the historical sources.

Reargument was largely devoted to the circumstances surrounding the adoption of the Fourteenth Amendment in 1868. It covered exhaustively consideration of the Amendment in Congress, ratification by the states, then-existing practices in racial segregation, and the views of proponents and opponents of the Amendment. This discussion and our own investigation convince us that, although these sources cast some light, it is not enough to resolve the problem with which we are faced. At best, they are inconclusive.

— Brown, 347 U.S. at 489.

The Court said the question was complicated by the major social and governmental changes that had taken place in the United States in the late 19th and early 20th centuries. It observed that in the late 1860s, public schools had been uncommon in the American South. At that time, Southern white children whose families could afford schooling usually attended private schools, while the education of Southern black children was "almost nonexistent", to the point that in some Southern states the education of black people was forbidden by law. The Court contrasted this with the situation in 1954: "Today, education is perhaps the most important function of our local and state governments." The Court concluded that, in making its ruling, it would have to "consider public education in light of its full development and its present place in American life throughout the Nation."

During the segregation era, it was common for black schools to have fewer resources and poorer facilities than white schools despite the equality required by the "separate but equal" doctrine. The Brown Court did not address this issue, probably because some of the school districts involved in the case had improved their black schools in order to "equalize" them with the white schools. This prevented the Court from finding a violation of the Fourteenth Amendment's Equal Protection Clause in "measurable inequalities" between all white and black schools and forced the Court to look to the effects of segregation itself. The Court therefore framed the case around the more general question of whether the principle of "separate but equal" was constitutional when applied to public education.

We come then to the question presented: Does segregation of children in public schools solely on the basis of race, even though the physical facilities and other "tangible" factors may be equal, deprive the children of the minority group of equal educational opportunities?

— Brown, 397 U.S. at 493.

In answer, the Court held that it did. The Court ruled that state-mandated segregation, even if implemented in schools of otherwise equal quality, is inherently unequal because of its harmful psychological effects upon the segregated black children.

To separate them [black children] from others of similar age and qualifications solely because of their race generates a feeling of inferiority as to their status in the community that may affect their hearts and minds in a way unlikely to ever be undone. The effect of this separation on their educational opportunities was well stated by a finding in the Kansas case ... :

Segregation of white and colored children in public schools has a detrimental effect upon the colored children. The impact is greater when it has the sanction of the law, for the policy of separating the races is usually interpreted as denoting the inferiority of the negro group. A sense of inferiority affects the motivation of a child to learn. Segregation with the sanction of law, therefore, has a tendency to retard the educational and mental development of negro children and to deprive them of some of the benefits they would receive in a racially integrated school system.

Whatever may have been the extent of psychological knowledge at the time of Plessy v. Ferguson, this finding is amply supported by modern authority. Any language in Plessy v. Ferguson contrary to this finding is rejected.

— Brown, 347 U.S. at 494 (alterations and footnotes omitted).

The Court supported its conclusion with citations to several psychological studies concluding that segregating black children made them feel inferior and interfered with their learning. These studies included those of Kenneth and Mamie Clark, whose experiments in the 1940s had suggested that black American children from segregated environments preferred white dolls over black dolls.

The Court concluded its relatively short opinion by declaring that segregated public education was inherently unequal, violated the Equal Protection Clause, and therefore was unconstitutional:

We conclude that in the field of public education the doctrine of "separate but equal" has no place. Separate educational facilities are inherently unequal. Therefore, we hold that the plaintiffs and others similarly situated for whom the actions have been brought are, by reason of the segregation complained of, deprived of the equal protection of the laws guaranteed by the Fourteenth Amendment.

— Brown, 397 U.S. at 495.

The Court did not close with an order to implement the integration of the schools of the various jurisdictions. Instead, it requested the parties re-appear before the Court the following term to hold arguments on what the appropriate remedy should be. This became the case known as Brown II, described below.

== Reaction and aftermath ==
Americans mostly cheered the Court's decision in Brown, but most white Southerners decried it. Many white Southerners viewed Brown as "a day of catastrophe—a Black Monday—a day something like Pearl Harbor." In the face of entrenched Southern opposition, progress on integrating American schools was slow. The American political historian Robert G. McCloskey described:

The reaction of the white South to this judicial onslaught on its institutions was noisy and stubborn. Certain "border states," which had formerly maintained segregated school systems, did integrate, and others permitted the token admission of a few Negro students to schools that had once been racially unmixed. However, the Deep South made no moves to obey the judicial command, and in some districts there can be no doubt that the Desegregation decision hardened resistance to integration proposals.

For several decades after the Brown decision, African-American teachers, principals, and other school staff who worked in segregated Black schools were fired or laid off as Southerners sought to create a system of integrated schools with White leadership. According to historian Michael Fultz, "In many ways the South moved faster, with more 'deliberate speed' in displacing Black educators than it did in desegregating schools."

A number of private segregation academies sprung up, as Brown only applied to public schools; scholars estimate that, across the nation, at least half a million white students were withdrawn from public schools between 1964 and 1975 to avoid mandatory desegregation. The Supreme Court ruled in Runyon v. McCrary (1976) that racial segregation in private schools violated federal law.

=== Deep South ===
Texas Attorney General John Ben Shepperd organized a campaign to generate legal obstacles to the implementation of desegregation. In September 1957, Arkansas governor Orval Faubus called out the Arkansas Army National Guard to block the entry of nine black students, later known as the "Little Rock Nine", after the desegregation of Little Rock Central High School. President Dwight D. Eisenhower responded by asserting federal control over the Arkansas National Guard and deploying troops from the U.S. Army's 101st Airborne Division stationed at Fort Campbell to ensure the black students could safely register for and attend classes.

Also in 1957, Florida's response was mixed. Its legislature passed an Interposition Resolution denouncing the decision and declaring it null and void. But Florida Governor LeRoy Collins, though joining in the protest against the court decision, refused to sign it, arguing that the attempt to overturn the ruling must be done by legal methods.

In Mississippi, fear of violence prevented any plaintiff from bringing a school desegregation suit for the next nine years. When Medgar Evers sued in 1963 to desegregate schools in Jackson, Mississippi, White Citizens Council member Byron De La Beckwith murdered him. Two subsequent trials resulted in hung juries. Beckwith was not convicted of the murder until 1994.

In June 1963, Alabama governor George Wallace personally blocked the door to the University of Alabama's Foster Auditorium to prevent the enrollment of two black students in what became known as the "Stand in the Schoolhouse Door" incident. Wallace sought to uphold his "segregation now, segregation tomorrow, segregation forever" promise he had given in his 1963 inaugural address. Wallace moved aside only when confronted by General Henry V. Graham of the Alabama National Guard, whom President John F. Kennedy had ordered to intervene.

Native American communities were also heavily impacted by segregation laws with native children being prohibited from attending white institutions. Native American children considered light-complexioned were allowed to ride school buses to previously all white schools, while dark-skinned Native children from the same tribe or band were barred from riding the same buses. Tribal leaders, having learned about Martin Luther King Jr.'s desegregation campaign in Birmingham, Alabama, contacted him for assistance. King promptly responded to the tribal leaders and through his intervention the problem was quickly resolved.

=== Upper South ===
In North Carolina, there was often a strategy of nominally accepting Brown, but tacitly resisting it. On May 18, 1954, the Greensboro, North Carolina school board declared that it would abide by the Brown ruling. This was the result of the initiative of D. E. Hudgins Jr., a Rhodes Scholar and prominent attorney, who chaired the school board. This made Greensboro the first, and for years the only, city in the South to announce its intent to comply. However, others in the city resisted integration, putting up legal obstacles to the actual implementation of school desegregation for years afterward, and in 1969, the federal government found the city was not in compliance with the 1964 Civil Rights Act. Transition to a fully integrated school system did not begin until 1971, after numerous local lawsuits and both nonviolent and violent demonstrations. Historians have noted the irony that Greensboro, which had heralded itself as such a progressive city, was one of the last holdouts for school desegregation.

In Moberly, Missouri, the schools were desegregated as ordered. However, after 1955, the African-American teachers from the local "negro school" were not retained; this was ascribed to poor performance. They appealed their dismissal in Naomi Brooks et al., Appellants, v. School District of City of Moberly, Missouri, Etc., et al.; but it was upheld, and the Supreme Court declined to hear a further appeal.

In Virginia, Senator Harry F. Byrd organized the Massive Resistance movement that included the closing of schools rather than desegregating them. Governor Thomas Stanley, a member of the Byrd Organization, appointed the Gray Commission, consisting of 32 Democrats led by state senator Garland Gray, to study the issue and make recommendations. The commission recommended giving localities "broad discretion" in meeting the new judicial requirements. However, in 1956, a special session of the Virginia legislature adopted a legislative package which allowed the governor to simply close all schools under desegregation orders from federal courts. In early 1958, newly elected Governor J. Lindsay Almond closed public schools in Charlottesville, Norfolk, and Warren County rather than comply with desegregation orders, leaving 10,000 children without schools despite opposition from various parents' groups. However, he reconsidered when on the Lee-Jackson state holiday, the Virginia Supreme Court ruled the closures violated the state constitution, and a panel of federal judges ruled they violated the U.S. Constitution. In early February 1959, both the Arlington County (also subject to an NAACP lawsuit) and Norfolk schools desegregated peacefully.

Soon, all counties in Virginia reopened and integrated their public schools with the exception of Prince Edward County which took the extreme step of choosing not to appropriate any funding for its school system, thus forcing all its public schools to close. As a partial remedy, Prince Edward County provided tuition grants for all students, regardless of their race, to use for private, nonsectarian education. Since no private schools existed for blacks within the county, black children either had to leave the county to receive any education between 1959 and 1963, or received no education. All private schools in the region remained racially segregated. This lasted until 1964, when the U.S. Supreme Court ruled in Griffin v. County School Board of Prince Edward County that Prince Edward County's decision to provide tuition grants for private schools that only admitted whites violated the Equal Protection Clause of the Fourteenth Amendment.

=== North ===
Many Northern cities also had de facto segregation policies, which resulted in a vast gulf in educational resources between black and white communities. In Harlem, New York, for example, not a single new school had been built since the turn of the century, nor did a single nursery school exist, even as the Second Great Migration caused overcrowding of existing schools. Existing schools tended to be dilapidated and staffed with inexperienced teachers. Northern officials were in denial of the resulting segregation, but Brown helped stimulate activism among African-American parents such as Mae Mallory, who with support of the NAACP initiated a successful lawsuit against the city and State of New York on Brown's principles. Mallory and thousands of other parents bolstered the pressure of the lawsuit with a school boycott in 1959. During the boycott, some of the first Freedom Schools of the period were established. The city responded to the campaign by permitting more open transfers to high-quality, historically white schools.

=== Topeka ===
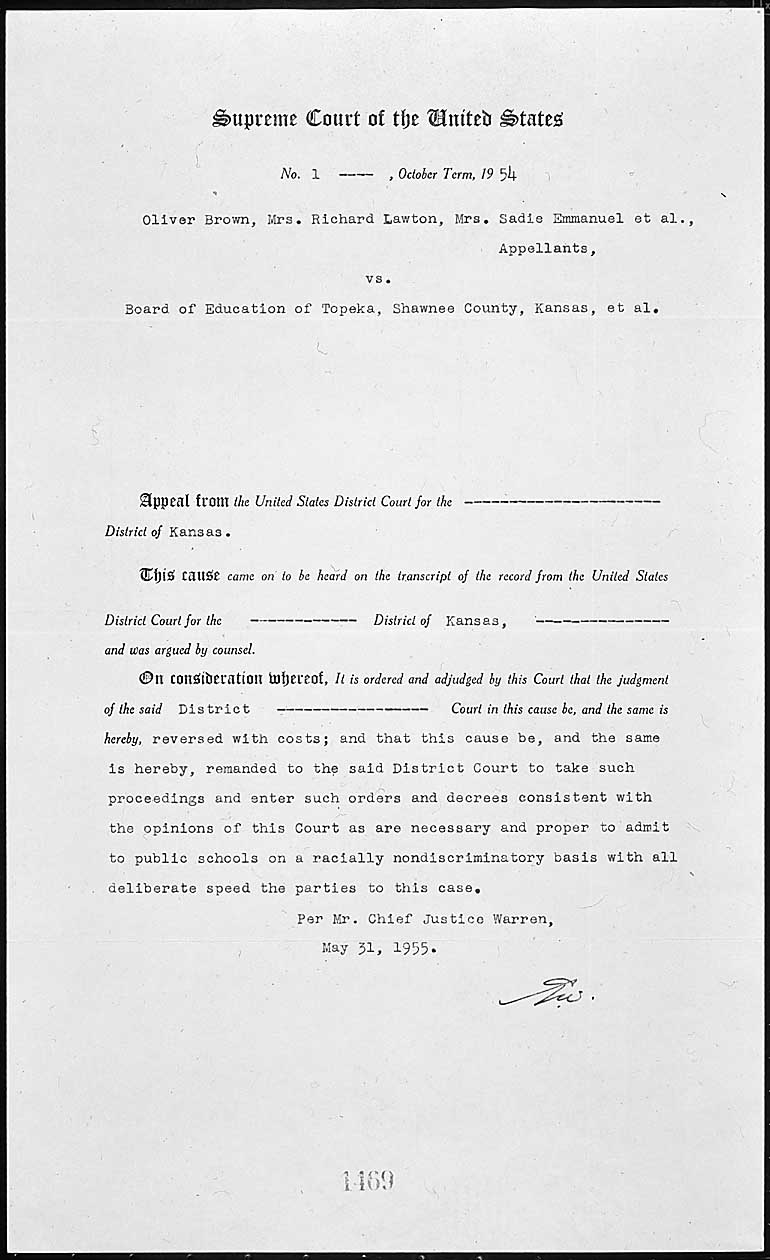
Judgment and order of the Supreme Court for the case

In Topeka, Kansas, where the Brown case originated, the junior high schools had been integrated since 1941. Topeka High School was integrated from its inception in 1871 and its sports teams had been integrated since 1949. The Kansas law permitting segregated schools allowed them only "below the high school level".

Soon after the district court decision, election outcomes and the political climate in Topeka changed. The Board of Education of Topeka began to end segregation in the Topeka elementary schools in August 1953, integrating two attendance districts. All the Topeka elementary schools were changed to neighborhood attendance centers in January 1956, although existing students were allowed to continue attending their prior assigned schools at their option. Plaintiff Zelma Henderson, in a 2004 interview, recalled that no demonstrations or tumult accompanied desegregation in Topeka's schools: "They accepted it ... It wasn't too long until they integrated the teachers and principals."

The Topeka Public Schools administration building is named in honor of McKinley Burnett, NAACP chapter president who organized the case. Monroe Elementary was designated a National Historic Site under the National Park Service on October 26, 1992, and redesignated a National Historical Park on May 12, 2022.

== Legal criticism and praise ==
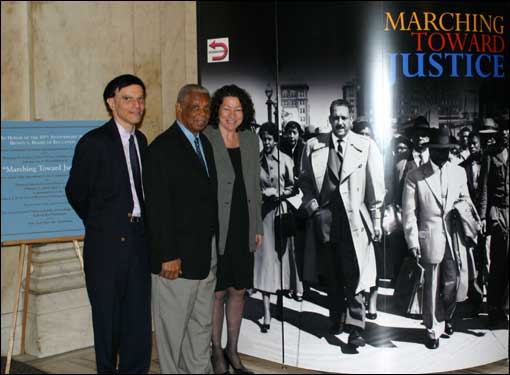
U.S. circuit judges (from left to right) Robert A. Katzmann, Damon J. Keith, and Sonia Sotomayor at a 2004 exhibit on the Fourteenth Amendment, Thurgood Marshall, and Brown v. Board of Education

Future Supreme Court Chief Justice William Rehnquist wrote a memo titled "A Random Thought on the Segregation Cases" when he was a law clerk for Justice Robert H. Jackson in 1952, during early deliberations that led to the Brown v. Board of Education decision. In his memo, Rehnquist argued: "I realize that it is an unpopular and unhumanitarian position, for which I have been excoriated by 'liberal' colleagues but I think Plessy v. Ferguson was right and should be reaffirmed." Rehnquist continued, "To the argument ... that a majority may not deprive a minority of its constitutional right, the answer must be made that while this is sound in theory, in the long run it is the majority who will determine what the constitutional rights of the minorities are." Rehnquist also argued in favor of Plessy with other law clerks.

However, during his 1971 confirmation hearings to join the Supreme Court, Rehnquist said, "I believe that the memorandum was prepared by me as a statement of Justice Jackson's tentative views for his own use." Jackson had initially planned to issue a dissent in Brown. Later, at his 1986 hearings for the slot of Chief Justice, Rehnquist put further distance between himself and the 1952 memo: "The bald statement that Plessy was right and should be reaffirmed, was not an accurate reflection of my own views at the time." In any event, while serving on the Supreme Court, Rehnquist made no effort to reverse or undermine the Brown decision, and frequently relied upon it as precedent.

Chief Justice Warren's reasoning was broadly criticized by contemporary legal academics. Judge Learned Hand decried that the Supreme Court had "assumed the role of a third legislative chamber" and Herbert Wechsler found Brown impossible to justify based on neutral principles.

Some aspects of the Brown decision are still debated. Notably, Supreme Court Justice Clarence Thomas, himself an African American, wrote in Missouri v. Jenkins (1995) that at the very least, Brown I has been misunderstood by the courts.

Brown I did not say that "racially isolated" schools were inherently inferior; the harm that it identified was tied purely to de jure segregation, not de facto segregation. Indeed, Brown I itself did not need to rely upon any psychological or social-science research in order to announce the simple, yet fundamental truth that the Government cannot discriminate among its citizens on the basis of race. ...

Segregation was not unconstitutional because it might have caused psychological feelings of inferiority. Public school systems that separated blacks and provided them with superior educational resources making blacks "feel" superior to whites sent to lesser schools—would violate the Fourteenth Amendment, whether or not the white students felt stigmatized, just as do school systems in which the positions of the races are reversed. Psychological injury or benefit is irrelevant ...

Given that desegregation has not produced the predicted leaps forward in black educational achievement, there is no reason to think that black students cannot learn as well when surrounded by members of their own race as when they are in an integrated environment. (...) Because of their "distinctive histories and traditions," black schools can function as the center and symbol of black communities, and provide examples of independent black leadership, success, and achievement.

Some Constitutional originalists, notably Raoul Berger in his 1977 book Government by Judiciary, make the case that Brown cannot be defended by reference to the original understanding of the Fourteenth Amendment. They support this reading of the Amendment by noting that the Civil Rights Act of 1875 did not ban segregated schools and that the same Congress that passed the Amendment also voted to segregate schools in the District of Columbia. Michael W. McConnell, a federal judge on the United States Court of Appeals for the Tenth Circuit, in his article "Originalism and the Desegregation Decisions," argued that the Radical Reconstructionists who spearheaded the Fourteenth Amendment were in favor of desegregated southern schools. Evidence supporting this interpretation of the Amendment has come from archived Congressional records showing that proposals for federal legislation to enforce school integration were debated in Congress a few years following the Amendment's ratification.

In response to Michael McConnell's research, Raoul Berger argued that the Congressmen and Senators who were advocating in favor of school desegregation in the 1870s were trying to rewrite the Fourteenth Amendment to make it fit their political agenda and that the actual understanding of the Amendment from 1866 to 1868 (when it was debated in Congress) does, in fact, permit US states to have segregated schools. Berger criticized McConnell for being unable to find any reference to school segregation—let alone any reference to a desire to prohibit it—among supporters in the congressional history of this amendment (specifically in the recordings of the 39th United States Congress) and also criticized McConnell's view that "civil rights" philosophy of the 1950s should be decisive in interpreting the Fourteenth Amendment as opposed to the prevailing viewpoints of 1866.

The case also attracted some criticism from more liberal authors, including some who argue that Chief Justice Warren's reliance on psychological criteria to find a harm against segregated blacks was unnecessary. For example, Drew S. Days III has written: "we have developed criteria for evaluating the constitutionality of racial classifications that do not depend upon findings of psychic harm or social science evidence. They are based rather on the principle that 'distinctions between citizens solely because of their ancestry are by their very nature odious to a free people whose institutions are founded upon the doctrine of equality," referencing the 1943 Supreme Court ruling in Hirabayashi v. United States.

In June 1987, Philip Elman, a civil rights attorney who served as an associate in the Solicitor General's office during Harry Truman's term, claimed he and Associate Justice Felix Frankfurter were mostly responsible for the Supreme Court's decision, and stated that the NAACP's arguments did not present strong evidence. Elman has been criticized for offering a self-aggrandizing history of the case, omitting important facts, and denigrating the work of civil rights attorneys who had laid the groundwork for the decision over many decades. However, Frankfurter was also known for being one of the court's most outspoken advocates of the judicial restraint philosophy of basing court rulings on existing law rather than personal or political considerations.

In a 2016 article in Townhall.com, economist Thomas Sowell argued that when Chief Justice Earl Warren declared in the landmark 1954 case of Brown v. Board of Education that racially separate schools were "inherently unequal," Dunbar High School was a living refutation of that assumption. And it was within walking distance of the Supreme Court." In Sowell's estimation, "Dunbar, which had been accepting outstanding black students from anywhere in the city, could now accept only students from the rough ghetto neighborhood in which it was located" as a detrimental consequence of the Supreme Court's decision.

== Brown II ==
Brown v. Board of Education
- Supreme Court of the United States

Argued April 11-14, 1955 Decided May 31, 1955
- Full case name: Oliver Brown, et al. v. Board of Education of Topeka, et al.
- Citations: 349 U.S. 294 (more)
- Decision: Opinion

Holding
- Racial discrimination in public education is unconstitutional, and all provisions of federal, state or local law requiring or permitting such discrimination must yield to this principle. The District Courts are to take such proceedings and enter such orders and decrees consistent with this opinion as are necessary and proper to admit the parties to these cases to public schools on a racially non-discriminatory basis with all deliberate speed.

Court membership
- Chief Justice Earl Warren Associate Justices Hugo Black · Stanley F. Reed; Felix Frankfurter · William O. Douglas; Harold H. Burton · Tom C. Clark; Sherman Minton · John M. Harlan II

Case opinion
- Majority: Warren, joined by unanimous

In 1955, the Supreme Court considered arguments by the schools requesting relief concerning the task of desegregation. In their decision, which became known as Brown II, the court delegated the task of carrying out school desegregation to district courts with orders that desegregation occur "with all deliberate speed", a phrase traceable to Francis Thompson's poem "The Hound of Heaven".

Supporters of the earlier decision were displeased with these instructions. The language "all deliberate speed" was seen by critics as too ambiguous to ensure reasonable haste for compliance with the court's desegration ruling. Many Southern states and school districts interpreted Brown II as legal justification for resisting, delaying, and avoiding significant integration for years or decades with tactics such as closing down school systems, using state money to finance segregated "private" schools, and "token" integration where a few carefully selected black children were admitted to former white-only schools while keeping the vast majority in underfunded, unequal black schools.

For example, based on Brown II, a district court ruled that Prince Edward County, Virginia did not have to desegregate immediately. When faced with a court order to finally begin desegregation in 1959 the county board of supervisors stopped appropriating money for public schools, which remained closed for five years, from 1959 to 1964. White students in the county were given assistance to attend white-only "private academies" that were taught by teachers formerly employed by the public school system, while black students had no education at all unless they moved out of the county. But the public schools reopened after the Supreme Court overturned Brown II in Griffin v. County School Board of Prince Edward County, declaring that "the time for mere 'deliberate speed' has run out" and that the county must provide a public school system for all children regardless of race.

== Brown III ==
In 1978, Topeka attorneys Richard Jones, Joseph Johnson, and Charles Scott Jr. (son of the original Brown team member), with assistance from the American Civil Liberties Union, persuaded Linda Brown Smith—who now had her own children in Topeka schools—to be a plaintiff in reopening Brown. They were concerned that the Topeka Public Schools' policy of "open enrollment" had led to and would lead to further segregation. They also believed that with a choice of open enrollment, white parents would shift their children to "preferred" schools that would create both predominantly African-American and predominantly European-American schools within the district. The district court in Kansas reopened the initial Brown case after a 25-year hiatus, but denied the plaintiffs' request to rule the schools as "unitary". In 1989, a three-judge panel of the Tenth Circuit ruled 2–1 that the vestiges of segregation remained with respect to student and staff assignment. In 1993, the Supreme Court declined to hear this case on appeal and remanded it to the district court for implementation of the Tenth Circuit's mandate.

After a 1994 plan was approved, and a bond issue passed, Topeka issued a plan to add magnet schools and redraw district attendance plans to meet court standards of racial balance by 1998. Unified status was eventually granted to Topeka Unified School District No. 501 on July 27, 1999. One of the new magnet schools is named after the Scott family attorneys for their role in the Brown case and the civil rights movement.

== Legacy ==
In 1977 the Supreme Court said in Dayton Board of Education v. Brinkman that the equitable power of federal courts to restructure the operation of local school boards is "not plenary" and may be exercised "only on the basis of a constitutional violation". Quoting post-Brown cases like Swann v. Charlotte-Mecklenburg and Milliken v. Bradley, the Court ruled that federal courts finding a violation of constitutional significance may apply the Swann standard —"the scope of the remedy is determined by the nature and extent of the constitutional violation"—to design a remedy that redresses the difference between the incremental effect of discriminatory violations on school demographics and "what it would have been in the absence of such constitutional violations".

Linda Brown Thompson later recalled the experience of being refused enrollment:

...we lived in an integrated neighborhood and I had all of these playmates of different nationalities. And so when I found out that day that I might be able to go to their school, I was just thrilled, you know. And I remember walking over to Sumner school with my dad that day and going up the steps of the school and the school looked so big to a smaller child. And I remember going inside and my dad spoke with someone and then he went into the inner office with the principal and they left me out ... to sit outside with the secretary. And while he was in the inner office, I could hear voices and hear his voice raised, you know, as the conversation went on. And then he immediately came out of the office, took me by the hand and we walked home from the school. I just couldn't understand what was happening because I was so sure that I was going to go to school with Mona and Guinevere, Wanda, and all of my playmates.

Linda Brown died on March 25, 2018, at age 75.

== See also ==
- Civil rights movement (1896–1954)
- History of African Americans in Kansas
- List of United States court cases involving the Fourteenth Amendment
- Lum v. Rice (1927)
- New Orleans school desegregation crisis—Unrest following school desegregation
- Ole Miss riot of 1962
- Runyon v. McCrary (1976)—Bars segregation in private schools whereas Brown only applies to public schools
- Timeline of the civil rights movement
