= Oliver Brown (American activist) =

American activist (1918–1961)

- Undated photo of Brown
- Born: Oliver Leon. Brown; August 2, 1918; Topeka, Kansas, U.S.
- Died: June 20, 1961 (aged 42); Topeka, Kansas U.S.
- Education: Theology
- Occupation: African Methodist Episcopal pastor
- Known for: Brown v. Board of Education
- Spouse: Leola Brown (date of marriage unknown)
- Children: 3, including Linda Carol

Oliver Leon Brown (August 2, 1918 – June 20, 1961) was an American welder and Episcopalian pastor. He was known for being the plaintiff in the landmark 1954 United States Supreme Court case Oliver Brown, et al. v. Board of Education of Topeka, et al.

== Career ==
=== Supreme Court case ===
Brown was recruited to be part of the Topeka NAACP legal action to desegregate the city's public elementary schools in 1950. At the time, he was a welder for the Atchison, Topeka and Santa Fe Railway and was studying to become a minister. Attorney Charles Scott, Browns' childhood friend, asked him to join the roster of parents who would become plaintiffs in the organization's case against the Topeka Board of Education. The Topeka NAACP had assembled a group of 13 parents to serve as plaintiffs for the case that would eventually be filed under the name of one of the parents, Oliver Brown, becoming known as Oliver L. Brown et al. v. the Board of Education of Topeka (KS).

In the Topeka NAACP case, parents involved were concerned that their children had to be bused many blocks away from their neighborhoods when there were schools nearby. However, those schools were segregated, and for white children only. African-American children were assigned to one of the only four segregated schools for them.

After an unsuccessful attempt in federal district court, the NAACP case was appealed to the United States Supreme Court, where it was joined with cases from Delaware, South Carolina, Virginia, and Washington, D.C.

After the initial arguments in early 1953, the high court suffered the loss of Chief Justice Fred Vinson, who died suddenly. President Dwight Eisenhower then appointed former California Governor Earl Warren, who set a schedule for the cases to be reargued in late 1953. After several months of oral arguments, led by attorney Thurgood Marshall, who was director and counsel for the NAACP Legal Defense Fund (and would later be a Supreme Court justice himself), on May 17, 1954, Chief Justice Warren announced the court's landmark unanimous decision in favor of the plaintiffs. The plaintiffs included several hundred parents in addition to the 13 families in the Topeka case.

This decision overturned the "separate but equal" doctrine that had been used as the standard in civil rights lawsuits since the Plessy v. Ferguson case in 1896, in effect declaring it unconstitutional to have separate public schools for Black and white students. The decision is considered a major milestone in the Civil Rights Movement.

=== Pastor ===
In 1959, he was tenured as pastor of the Benton Avenue AME Church in Springfield, Missouri from 1959 until his death in 1961.

== Personal life ==
Brown abruptly died of a heart attack on June 20, 1961; he had been riding with fellow pastor Maurice Lange enroute to Topeka where his wife and daughters were visiting her parents. He was forty-two years old.

In 1988, the nonprofit Brown Foundation for Educational Equity, Excellence and Research was founded to preserve the legacy of the Brown decision. His daughter Cheryl Brown Henderson is the founding president of the foundation.

On October 26, 1992, after two years of work by the Brown Foundation, President George H. W. Bush signed the Brown v. The Board of Education National Historic Site Act, establishing the former Monroe Elementary School, one of the four formerly segregated African American elementary schools, as a national historic site.
