= Explorer Search and Rescue =

Team of search and rescue explorers

Explorer Search and Rescue (ESAR) are teams of Explorers in the Learning for Life program of the Boy Scouts of America who are trained and deployed for search and rescue missions. Well-developed ESAR programs emerged in the state of Washington in the mid-1950s (Beginning with King County in 1954) and were followed by others in California and elsewhere. The rugged, mountainous terrain of these areas often require massive amounts of manpower for proper searches for missing people, not to mention their rescue and evacuation from remote areas. The ESAR mission has also expanded over the years to include urban search and rescue and other disaster-related disciplines. Many ESAR groups also provide wilderness safety training to the public.

Hundreds of youths and adult advisors regularly participate as trained search specialists or provide other support services related to wilderness search and rescue. Some Law Enforcement Exploring groups also participate in ESAR training and missions. At times, qualified ESAR teams have also assisted in locating evidence of crimes, such as victims of Ted Bundy, in 1974, or Gary Ridgway (The Green River Murderer) in the 1980s, and searching for notorious aircraft hijacker D. B. Cooper in 1971. Generally, however, their skills are applied to finding overdue hikers, hunters, or carrying injured mountaineers to safety when airborne MEDEVAC is not feasible.

== Training and certification ==
Training can be rigorous and demanding, and may take years to accomplish. Members are generally proficient in wilderness survival, navigation, and first aid, and take advanced training in wilderness searching techniques including tracking, grid-searching for missing persons, and various types of rescue. There are also specialty areas including Incident Command System, radio communications, commissary and logistics provisioning, and progressive leadership advancement.

The first level of certification is that of team member and it is awarded only after an individual is able to demonstrate proficiency in search techniques, advanced wilderness navigation and depending on the region an Explorer post may be in a weekend of snow training. The extensive King County ESAR training course takes place during the winter months at Camp Edward (formerly camp Brinkley) in Snohomish County, Washington.

Once a team member is certified they can progress to the rank of team leader where they are in charge of a search team of anywhere from 2-15 individuals. Field leaders are in charge of the various teams in the field and report to the Operations Leader who in turn reports to the overall search coordinator who is responsible for coordinating all search and rescue efforts on a mission.

Certified teams are generally on-call 24 hours per day, 365 days per year, ready to assist local authorities, in cooperation with other SAR agencies. Many members go on to round out their skills with volunteer ski patrol, mountain rescue, Civil Air Patrol or as other professionals.

== See also ==
- Fire Service Exploring
- Health Career Exploring
- Law Enforcement Exploring
- Exploring
- Mountain rescue
- Wilderness first aid
- Multnomah County Sheriff's Office Search and Rescue
- Marin County Sheriff's Office Search & Rescue
- California Explorer Search and Rescue
