= Aviation Career Exploring =

Defunct branch of the Boy Scouts of America

- Owner: Learning for Life
- Country: United States
- Website; Aviation Career Exploring

Aviation Career Exploring, whose participants are called "Explorers," was one of the career-oriented programs offered by Learning for Life, an affiliate of the Boy Scouts of America (BSA).

== History ==
Air Scouts was a program of the BSA. The Air Scouts program had four ranks Apprentice, Observer, Craftsman, and Ace (later under the Explorer program the ranks were Apprentice, Bronze, Gold, and Silver Award). The Ace (Silver Award) cloth knot and medal may still be worn by anyone who earned them before the program was dropped.

The program was established in 1941 and existed under the name Air Scouts until 1949, when it was renamed Air Explorers. With minor changes, this program lasted until 1965, when it was fully merged into the then existing Explorer program of the BSA as a specialty called "Aviation Career Exploring."

On 1 March 1985, the Boy Scouts of America officially ended powered aircraft flight in its Aviation Exploring program, citing difficulties with maintaining insurance coverage in the event of an aircraft accident. 450 Explorer Posts and over 10,000 Explorer Scouts were affected.

== Activities ==
Members attend meetings twice a month. Activities during meetings may include:

- taking orientation flights in military transports, helicopters, gliders, or single-engine general aviation aircraft
- taking trips to Air Force bases, aviation museums, air shows, or FAA facilities.
- learning to pre-flight an aircraft
- taking pilot training ground school classes

Activities may be geared towards providing information for many common aviation careers, including:

- Pilots
- Aircraft mechanics
- Aerospace engineers
- Airport management and operations
- Unmanned aerial vehicle operators
- Avionics technicians
- Air traffic controllers
- Flight attendants

== Membership ==
The program is open to youth aged 14–20.

== See also ==
- Civil Air Patrol
- Fire Service Exploring
- Health Career Exploring
- Law Enforcement Exploring
