= W. Scott Sorrels =

American attorney at law

Scott Sorrels
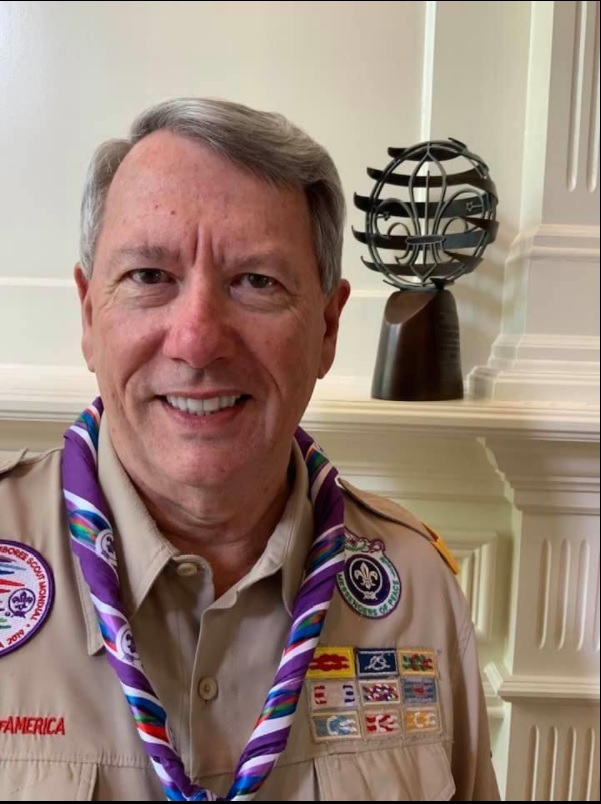
- Sorrels in 2020
- Born: William Scott Sorrels; January 2, 1956 (age 70); Macon, Georgia, US
- Education: Mercer University (BA); University of Georgia School of Law (JD)
- Occupation: Attorney at law
- Known for: Scouting
- Board member of: Midtown Alliance; Boy Scouts of America
- Spouse: Tina Sorrels
- Children: 2
- Awards: Distinguished Eagle Scout Award, Justice Robert Benham Award

W. Scott Sorrels is an American attorney at law. Sorrels was a partner of the law firm Sutherland Asbill & Brennan LLP, a law firm headquartered in Atlanta, Georgia. He was the 12th National Commissioner of the Boy Scouts of America (BSA), from 2020 to 2025.

== Background ==
Sorrels graduated magna cum laude from Mercer University, later graduating from the University of Georgia School of Law.

== Civic Involvement ==
=== Boy Scouts of America ===
He is an Eagle Scout, the highest rank attainable in the Scouts BSA program. He has been awarded the Vigil Honor from the Order of the Arrow, and the William H. Spurgeon III Award.

Sorrels has served many positions within the Scouts at the unit, council, area, and regional levels. He has served as the National Commissioner Service Chairman, vice chair for the National Venturing Committee, the Area 9 president for the Southern Region, Venturing chair for the Southern Region,

He is a past council president for the Northeast Georgia Council, and served on the boards of the Atlanta Area Council, and the Northeast Georgia Council. Sorrels was the co-chair of the 24th World Scout Jamboree.

== Awards ==
Sorrels has been awarded with the Venturing Leadership Award, the District Award of Merit, Silver Beaver, Silver Antelope, Silver Buffalo and Distinguished Eagle Scout Award by the Boy Scouts of America.

He was awarded the Bronze Wolf Award by the World Scout Committee.
