= Northeast Georgia Council =

Local council of the Boy Scouts of America

- Owner: Scouting America
- Headquarters: Pendergrass, Georgia
- Location: 148 Boy Scout Trail, Pendergrass, GA 30567
- Country: United States
- Coordinates: 34.153448°N 83.663190°W
- Website nega-bsa.org

The Northeast Georgia Council is a local council of the Scouting America that serves 26 counties in northeastern Georgia. The council provides Scouting programs to over 25,000 youth through Cub Scouting, Scouts BSA, Venturing, Exploring, and in-school Learning for Life initiatives.

== Organization ==
The council has service centers in Pendergrass and Lawrenceville, Georgia. Administratively, the council is divided into seven geographic districts, along with a separate district for Exploring and Venturing programs:

- Apalachee District – serves northern Gwinnett County;
- Chattahoochee District – serves Barrow, Hall, and Jackson counties;
- Cherokee District – serves Hart, Elbert, Franklin, Madison, Clarke, Oglethorpe, Oconee, Morgan, and Greene counties;
- Currahee District – serves Banks, Habersham, Rabun, Stephens, and White counties;
- Etowah District – serves Forsyth, Dawson, and Lumpkin counties;
- Mountain District – serves Gilmer, Fannin, Towns, and Union counties;
- Sweetwater District – serves Walton and southern Gwinnett counties.
- Exploring–Venturing District – supports the Venturing and Exploring programs in Gwinnett and Walton counties, which are not covered in traditional district roundtables.

== Camps ==
=== Camp Rainey Mountain ===
Camp Rainey Mountain, founded in 1954, is located near Clayton, Georgia. Centered around Lake Toccoa, the camp features 25 campsites equipped with tents and/or Adirondack shelters. Adjacent to the Parade Field is the H. Randolph Holder Dining Hall, where Scouts, Scouters, and staff eat most meals during Summer Camp and other major events throughout the year.

During Summer Camp, the Trading Post operates, offering T-shirts, pocket knives, and other camp merchandise. Attached to the Trading Post is the Snack Shack, where campers and staff can purchase candy, soft drinks, ice cream, and other snacks. Along the shores of Lake Toccoa is the Stewart Amphitheater, constructed entirely from granite sourced in Elberton, GA.

At the northern end of the camp, the Big Rock Trail leads hikers to a granite outcrop on the side of Rainey Mountain, offering scenic views of the camp and the surrounding Blue Ridge Mountains. The current camp ranger is Alex Foster.

==== Summer Camp ====
Each summer, Camp Rainey Mountain hosts the Northeast Georgia Council's only Scouts BSA Summer Camp. Troops from across the Southeastern United States attend to earn merit badges, participate in a variety of programs, and enjoy recreational activities. The summer camp typically runs for seven week-long sessions, each from Sunday to Saturday.

Classes are held Monday through Friday, with no formal classes on Thursday, which is designated as "Free-range Thursday." On this day, Scouts can explore camp-wide activities and experiences not typically offered during the standard schedule.

As of the 2023 season, the camp offered 68 different merit badges and several high-adventure programs. Certification courses are also available to both youth and adult participants, including CPR/AED, Safety Afloat, and BSA Lifeguard training.

The 2023 camp fees were $365 for Scouts registered with the Northeast Georgia Council, and $395 for out-of-council participants.

For newer Scouts, Camp Rainey Mountain offers a structured advancement program called The New Trail (TNT). This program helps new Scouts work toward rank advancement in a guided, group environment.

===== High Adventure =====
For scouts aged 14 or older, several high adventure programs available at additional cost:

====== C.O.P.E. ======
The Challenging Outdoor Personal Experience (commonly known as C.O.P.E.) is a program designed to help Scouts develop teamwork, confidence, leadership, and initiative. Participants work together to complete a series of physical and mental challenges, many of which involve navigating obstacles at height. The emphasis is on group problem-solving and personal growth.

At Camp Rainey Mountain, the C.O.P.E. program takes place in Challenge Valley, located just south of the main camp area.

====== Whitewater K.R. ======
Whitewater K.R. (short for Whitewater Kayaking and Rafting) is an offsite program that allows Scouts to participate in whitewater activities throughout the week. Led by certified and experienced instructors, Scouts depart from Camp Rainey Mountain each morning to engage in kayaking and rafting on the nearby Chattooga River, returning to camp each evening.

====== Climbing Adventure ======
Climbing Adventure teaches Scouts the fundamentals of rock climbing. The program begins at Challenge Valley, where participants practice on the camp’s climbing tower. As the week progresses, Scouts climb at various locations around the camp. Weather permitting, they have the opportunity to climb a natural rock face at Currahee during Free-range Thursday.

====== Bow Xtreme Skills ======
Bow Xtreme Skills is a program introduced at Camp Rainey Mountain in 2022. Designed for older Scouts, it focuses on teaching advanced survival skills, particularly the use of improvised equipment. The program is held at Pioneer Village, located south of the main camp.

=== Scoutland ===
Scoutland, located on Lake Lanier, offers year-round camping and aquatics activities. It serves as one of the Northeast Georgia Council's two summer camps and is also the site of the Webelos Adventure Camp. The current ranger is Jon Clark.

=== Camp Rotary ===
Camp Rotary, located on Lake Hartwell, offers year-round primitive camping. This 25-acre camp was established with funds raised by the Rotary Club of Hartwell, Georgia. The current ranger is Jon Willette.

== Order of the Arrow ==
The Northeast Georgia Council is served by Mowogo Lodge of the Order of the Arrow, Scouting’s national honor society. Each year, members of the Lodge—called Arrowmen—contribute hundreds of hours of service to the council’s three camps. According to records from the National Office, Mowogo Lodge was first chartered in 1943. The name Mowogo honors Moses W. Gordon, a longtime friend and supporter of the council’s camping and Scouting programs. The Lodge’s totem is a black bear on all fours.

Mowogo Lodge is organized into seven chapters, each corresponding to a district within the council:

- Ani-Gatogewi – Cherokee District
- Canantutlaga – Apalachee District
- Japeechen – Etowah District
- Jutaculla – Currahee District
- Lau-in-nih – Sweetwater District
- Machque – Mountain District
- Yona-Hi – Chattahoochee District

As of 2025, the Lodge Chief is Sankalp Yeleti, the Lodge Adviser is Rusty Royston, and the Lodge Staff Adviser is Phillip Nichols, Council Program Director.

In April 2016, Camp Rainey Mountain hosted the Southern Region, Section 9 (SR-9) Conclave. As part of the Order of the Arrow’s national reorganization under Project Magellan, Mowogo Lodge was reassigned in December 2021 from SR-9 to the newly created Eastern Region, Section 6 (E6). Camp Rainey Mountain is scheduled to host Section E6’s Indian Winter in January 2027 and the Section Conclave in April 2028.

Mowogo Lodge members Jacob Ball and James Chalmers have held several regional leadership roles. Ball served as the 2021–2022 Section Secretary, and Chalmers served as 2021–2022 Section Vice Chief and 2022–2023 Section Chief. Ball later ran unopposed for the 2023–2024 Section Chief position.

At the 2022 National Order of the Arrow Conference (NOAC), Jason Stribling, a member of Mowogo Lodge, was honored with the prestigious Distinguished Service Award.

== See also ==
- Scouting in Georgia (U.S. state)
