= Young American Award =

Award of the Boy Scouts of America

- Country: United States
- Created: 1954
- Founder: Department of Justice
- Awarded for: Excellence in scholastics and in service
- Recipients: 188 national awards (1968–2008)

The Young American Award is an award of the Boy Scouts of America for outstanding college students ages 19 through 25 who have achieved excellence in the fields of art, athletics, business, community service, education, government, humanities, literature, music, religion, and science; and have given service to their community, state, and/or country.

The award was presented at both the national and the local council levels, but the national program was discontinued in 2009 due to funding. A maximum of five national awards had been presented annually while local awards continue to be unlimited. Each local council made the determination for nominating its candidates for national competition. Recipients of the national award also received a $7,500 cash award that was primarily funded by Learning for Life. Membership in any of the BSA or Learning for life programs is not obligatory.

== Award ==
The national award consisted of a silver medallion suspended from a red, white and blue ribbon worn around the neck. The medallion bears the images of young man and a young woman above a wreath. Local recipients receive a gold version of the medallion affixed to a wooden plaque. Recipients may wear the corresponding square knot insignia, with a silver knot on a red, white and blue background, on the BSA uniform.

== History ==
The award was first presented in 1954 by the United States Department of Justice as the Young American Award for Service and the Young American Award for Bravery. Each of these awards were to be presented to two young people from each state and territory annually. The Justice Department had trouble promoting the award and approached the BSA for assistance in 1966.

With the launch of coeducational Exploring in 1968, the BSA took on the role of soliciting and receiving nominations, and assumed the program in 1971. The awards were originally available to youth ages 15 through 25; in 2005, it was changed to college students ages 19 through 25.

The original medals were suspended from neck ribbons, but the BSA soon changed them to a table medal, with the medallion placed in a block of acrylic glass. The ribbon version of the medal was restored for the national award after the introduction of Venturing.

The square knot insignia is the same as was used for three former Exploring awards: the Explorer Silver Award, Exploring Achievement Award and the Exploring G.O.L.D. Award. This knot may also be worn by those Scouting and Venturing leaders who have earned the predecessor awards.

== National Recipients ==
From 1968 through 2008, there have been 188 recipients of the national award.

1968

- Greg Bamford, Colorado
- Anthony Watson, Illinois
- William Cobb, Nevada
- Ann Marie Kaminski, Nebraska
- Rick Sowash, Ohio

1969

- Michael Shearn, Texas
- Debra George, Wyoming
- Joseph Lundy, California
- Staff Sgt. Dwight H. Johnson, Michigan
- George Begay, Arizona

1970

- Rodney Earl Donaldson, Texas
- Paul Douglas Ring, Arizona
- John Parker Stewart, Colorado
- Rex Kern, Ohio
- Madeline Manning Jackson, Ohio
- Jennifer Sue Inskeep, Kansas

1971

- David Powell, Utah
- Craig R. Rudlin, Virginia
- Clayton Taylor, Oklahoma
- James Heath, New York
- Claudia Turner, South Carolina
- Virginia A. Stroud, Wyoming

1972

- Charles Ealey, Jr. Ohio
- Janet Lynne Nowicki, Illinois
- Suzonne Elizabeth Quave, Louisiana
- Larry Lee Shaw, Utah
- Larry Simpson, Tennessee

1973

- Rufus Washington, Jr., North Carolina
- Stephen Brady, Hawaii
- Robert Meldrum, Utah
- Larry Eisenberg, Illinois
- Judy Bochenski, Oregon
- Robert Charles Howe, Illinois

1974

- Roger Henry Brown, Jr., Georgia
- Kenneth Beale, Jr., Pennsylvania
- Aaron J. Jorgensen, Minnesota
- Darrel Owen Pace, Ohio

1975

- Graciela Trilla, New York
- Garth Cox, Ohio
- Ashby Boyle II, Utah
- Thomas Camp, Nebraska
- Stanley Roach, Oklahoma
- Stan Tenenbaum, New York

1976

- Fredrick McClure, Texas
- Nancy Ann Kraemer, New York
- Terri Sue Hannon, Kansas
- John L. Dardenne, Jr., Louisiana
- Mary Van Lear Wright, Massachusetts
- Bradley Haddock, Kansas
- Angela Lea Garner, Tennessee
- Eileen Devine, California
- John E. Hayashi, Missouri
- Gerald R. Castellianos, Florida
- Dorothy Hamill, Connecticut

1977

- Lee Zachary Maxey, Texas
- Mark Daniel Worrell, Pennsylvania
- David Gene McKenney, United States Air Force Academy
- Allen Matheson Hughes, Utah
- Douglas Leighton Bandow, California
- Richard David Thomas, Idaho
- Beth Susan Dochinger, Ohio
- Ruth Lydia Bonaparte, Oregon
- Robert Hoke Perkins, Jr.

1978

- Kathy Howard, Oklahoma
- William Grau, New Jersey
- Joseph Rabatin, Minnesota
- Kenneth Allen, Nebraska
- Mary Beth Caruso, Massachusetts
- Larry Kwak, Kansas

1979

- Steve Cauthen, Kentucky
- Catherine Lazaro, Texas
- Richard Preister, Nebraska
- Jill Sterkel, California
- Scott Trotter, Utah
- David Tulanian, California

1980

- Peggy Ann Hall, Iowa
- Robert J. Hayashi, Missouri
- Mark W. Leinmiller, Georgia
- Nancy Lieberman, New York
- Steadman Shealy, Alabama
- Kerry L. Sorenson, Utah

1981

- Karen L. Middleton, Wisconsin
- Jeffrie A. Herrmann, New York
- Jennifer L. Shaw, Connecticut
- Roger W. Slead, Missouri
- Davalu D. Smith, Texas
- Sherri L. Dalphonse, New Hampshire

1982

- John Ashley Null, Kansas
- Timothy Michael Delorey, Florida
- Vincent Arnold Lazaro, Texas
- Cynthia Ann Reeves, Oklahoma
- Karl Julius Edelmann, Michigan
- Anthony Deh-Chuen So, Delaware

1988

- Douglas C. Barnhart, Pennsylvania
- Ron Brooks, New Jersey
- Paul Gonzales, California
- Laura Hengehold, Ohio
- Anne V. Ingram, North Carolina

1990

- Peter Boyer, Rhode Island
- John M. Garrison, Texas
- Hugh Herr, Pennsylvania
- Vick Huber, Delaware
- Talia Melanie McCray, Colorado

1992

- Frank Bradish, Idaho
- Derek Y. Kunimoto, Hawaii
- Arthur J. Ochoa, Delaware
- Mark Smith, Oregon
- Trina R. Williams, Indiana

1993

- Tracy L. Collett, Georgia
- Marlon Harmon, Wisconsin
- Hung Pham, Colorado
- Michael E. Plochocki, New York
- Joseph E. Ponzo, Massachusetts

1994

- Harold Richard Davis, Jr., South Carolina
- Javier David Margo, Jr., Texas
- Lethuy Thi Nguyen, Oklahoma
- Jamel Oeser-Sweat, New York
- Roderick D. Tranum, Georgia

1995

- Kevin Michael Crozier, Colorado
- Renee Kylene Hamel, Oklahoma
- Preston Hopson, III, Michigan
- Robert Lester Murry, Massachusetts
- Phillip Charles Rodriguez III, California

1996

- David Quinn Gacioch, New York
- Joel Morales, Jr., Texas
- Nan-Phong Duy Phan, California
- Randolph Walker, Jr., Mississippi
- Julie Anne Waller, North Carolina

1997

- Robert Edward Hugh Ferguson, Jr., Utah
- Christopher Todd Fullerton, Georgia
- Yukitoshi Murasaki, Florida
- Matthew John Spence, California
- Sabrina Martinique Thompson, North Carolina

1998

- Amanda Gayle Cox, Georgia
- Kirk Cristman Fistick, Maryland
- G. Christopher Jones, Oklahoma
- Denise Yvette Margo, Texas
- Hayata Kristy Poonyagariyagorn, Oregon

1999

- Justin Daniel Guerra, Missouri
- Erica Camille Quick, North Carolina
- Sylvester George Tan, Georgia
- Michelle Irene Towle, Minnesota
- John J. van Velthuyzen, Washington

2000

- Julius Demarcus Jackson, Texas
- Carl Frederick Regelmann, New York
- Svati Singla, North Carolina
- Alison L. Smith, Minnesota
- Christopher Kirill Sokolov, California

2001

- James W. Johnson, Pennsylvania
- Jason Wayne Kemp, North Carolina
- Hong-Ly Thi La, Maryland
- Cyrus Jerrerson Lawayer IV, Maryland
- Evan Michael Todd, Colorado

2002

- Michael John Beckel, Minnesota
- Lindsey D. Cameron, Texas
- Christina Hsiung Chen, Texas
- Mark Alan Mallak, Florida
- Edward J. Walneck, Arizona

2003

- Kyle James Cline, Illinois
- Brett Michael Patrick Klukan, Pennsylvania
- Katherine Ann Knuth, Minnesota
- Akeem Rasheed Samuels, New Jersey
- Jonathan P. Wilkerson, Texas

2004

- Aaron Azur Allen, California
- Elizabeth Anne Beckel, Minnesota
- Evan Eugene Hunsberger, California
- James Steven Kleckner, Wisconsin
- Kevin Koo, New Hampshire

2005

- Robert Kyle Alderson, Oklahoma
- Aubyn Cathleen Burnside, South Carolina
- Christopher Alan Kerzich, Illinois
- Melanie Alise Perry, Missouri
- Michael David Sekora, Pennsylvania

2006

- Benjamin Jacob Ulrich Banwart, Minnesota
- Mark Christopher Bicket, Oklahoma
- Richard B. Birrer, New York
- Shreyans C. Parekh, California
- Phillip D. Stewart, Nevada

2007

- Fernando S. Arán Jr., Florida
- Daniel Cayce, Arkansas
- Michael Alexander Hayoun, New Jersey
- Michael Quang Nguyen, California
- Logan Mark Skelley, Missouri

2008

- Paul Jacob Parker Banwart, Minnesota
- Gary Conard Bosshardt, Utah
- Welland Dane Burnside, South Carolina
- Sameer Gupta, Georgia
- Evan Jameson Spencer, Arizona

Per the national office national awards will no longer be given.

== See also ==
- Awards and decorations of the United States government
