= Mike Bannister =

British airline pilot (born 1949)

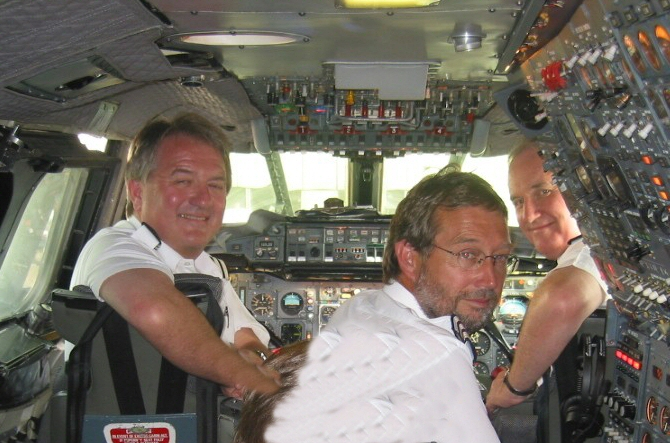
- Bannister (left) in 2006
- Born: May 1949 (age 76)
- Known for: Chief Pilot of British Airways' Concorde fleet

Mike Bannister (born May 1949) is an airline pilot. He is best known as the Chief Pilot of British Airways' Concorde fleet, a post which he held from 1995 until its withdrawal from service in 2003.

== Education ==
Bannister graduated from the Ashton School, Dunstable, and the College of Air Training Hamble, having been awarded a Royal Air Force Flying Scholarship in 1966.

== Career ==
Bannister joined BOAC (British Airways' predecessor) in 1969 as a pilot and flight navigator on the Vickers VC10 fleet. He joined the British Airways crew of Concorde in 1977 where he became its youngest pilot. In his Concorde career Bannister accumulated around 9,600 Concorde flight hours, almost 7,000 of which were supersonic. Bannister captained Concorde's retirement flight from New York to London on 24 October 2003.

Since Concorde's retirement, Bannister has contributed significantly to the raising of over £350,000 for good causes by lectures, signings and personal contributions. He holds voluntary roles including a Chair of School Governors of an independent school in Surrey, corporate non-executive directorships, lay chair of a parochial church council of the Anglican Church, and as a trustee of Brooklands Museum.

He currently works for an aviation consultancy specialising in airline management and aircraft-related operational, safety, and security matters.

He released a book, Concorde, in 2022 in which he writes about his flying experiences especially his flying career on Concorde.
