= Fatimé Soukar Térab =

Chadian businesswoman and entrepreneur

Fatimé Soukar Térap
- Born: 1989 (age 36–37); N'Djamena
- Citizenship: Chad

Fatimé Soukar Térap, born on 1989, September, 20 in N'Djamena, is a businesswoman and Chadian entrepreneur.

== Biography ==
=== Education and Private Life ===
Fatimé Soukar was born in N’Djamena on September 20, 1989. Having obtained a baccalaureate in science (series D), in 2006 she enrolled in social sciences at the Higher School of Commerce in Dakar before joining her husband in Addis Ababa, Ethiopia. She also continued her studies at the Ethiopian Airlines academy, graduating with a degree in aviation management, while simultaneously undertaking professional training in hotel management, business administration, and information technology.

She married at the age of 16, and is the mother of four children.

=== Background ===
After working at Ethiopian Airlines and in the protocol division of the African Union, Fatimé embarked on agricultural entrepreneurship and the empowerment of youth and women. She became the leader of the network of stakeholders for organic agricultural production in Chad and created the "Khadar Market & Garden" supermarket.

In 2016, she co-founded the organization "AYA-Chad," which aimed to reduce poverty among young people and women through the promotion of sustainable development, and which she led until 2020.

Director General of the Special Fund for the Environment (FSE) in Chad, from September 2019 to February 2020, she was appointed, on March 28, 2022, advisor on gender, family promotion and early childhood to the President of the Republic of Chad.

== Distinctions ==
Winner of the African Patriotic Amazon Prize for Best Entrepreneur in 2019, she won, in 2020, the Africa 3535 Prizes in the Agriculture and Agribusiness category and the Best Initiatives 2021 prize.

In 2022, she was selected as Obama leader Africa and Desertech leader in 2023.
