= Richards Miller =

American scout leader

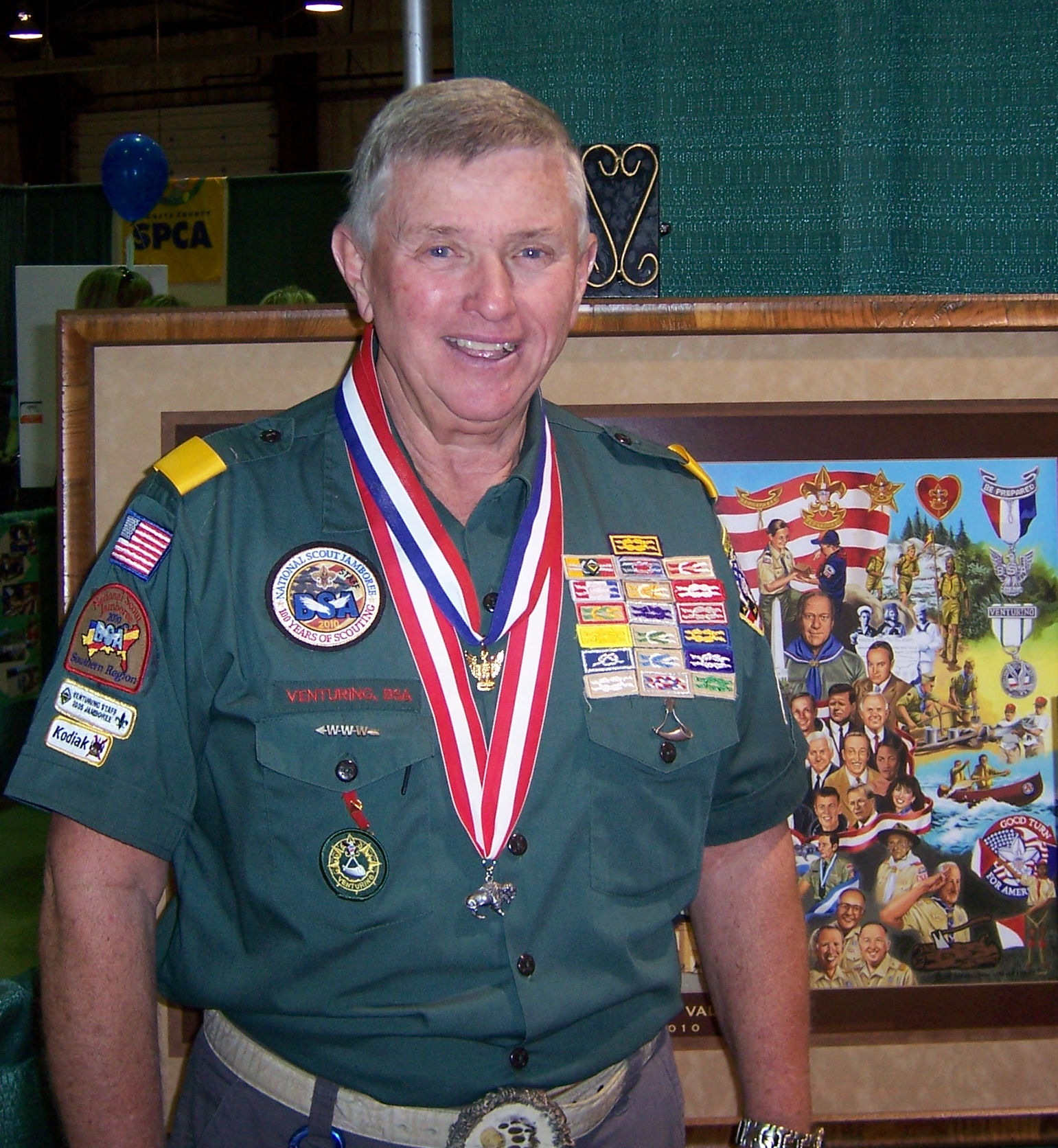
- Born: Richards Marion Miller
- Other name: Doc Miller
- Education: Brigham Young University
- Occupation: Dentist
- Awards: Distinguished Eagle Scout Award; Silver Buffalo Award; Venturing Leadership Award; Silver Antelope Award

Richards Marion "Doc" Miller is a dentist and one of the founders of the Venturing program of the Boy Scouts of America. Miller is the recipient of the Distinguished Eagle Scout Award and Silver Buffalo Award

== Early life ==
Miller attended Brigham Young University. While there, he was a cheerleader from 1967 to 1969; becoming the head cheerleader in 1969.

== Career ==
Miller founded a dental practice in Waynesboro, Virginia in 1974.

From 1986–1997, Miller was the junior varsity volleyball coach at Wilson Memorial High School in Fishersville, Virginia.

== Scouting ==
Miller joined the Boy Scouts of America (BSA) when he was fourteen years old and became an Eagle Scout with two Eagle Palms in 1959. Miller was the Eagle Scout chosen to escort President John F. Kennedy for his inauguration and Inaugural Ball in 1960.

He joined the Eagle Scout honor society, Knights of Dunamis, and helped to found a local chapter of its successor, the National Eagle Scout Association, serving as its chairman. Active in the BSA Order of the Arrow honor since 1957, he served as a lodge adviser.

Miller was a Scoutmaster for seven years, was president of the Virginia Headwaters Council, and the council commissioner. He was the National Outdoor Venturing Chairman from 1998 to 2004, overseeing 250,000 scouts. From 2000 to 2003, he served on the National BSA Field Book Task Force, writing the Fieldbook: The BSA's Manual of Advanced Skills for Outdoor Travel, Adventure, and Caring for the Land, 4th edition (2004). He also helped authored the Wood Badge in the 21st Century scout leader training course.

In 2005, he received the Silver Buffalo Award, Scouting’s highest commendation for adult volunteers. On May 25, 1996, he was awarded the Silver Antelope Award at the national BSA convention in Hawaii.

== Awards and honors ==
- Eagle Scout with two Eagle Palms, 1959
- Silver Antelope Award, 1996
- Distinguished Service Award of the Order of the Arrow, 1998
- Venturing Leadership Award, 2000
- Distinguished Eagle Scout Award, 2001
- Silver Buffalo Award, 2005

== Personal and family life ==
Miller lives in Waynesboro, Virginia with his wife Georgiana Hardesty Miller. He is the father of four daughters and one son who is also an Eagle Scout. He is a member of The Church of the Latter-Day Saints.

== See also ==
- List of Eagle Scouts
- List of recipients of the Silver Antelope Award
- List of recipients of the Silver Buffalo Award
- Recipients of the Distinguished Service Award of the Order of the Arrow
