= Los Angeles Police Department Cadet Program =

Cadet program of the LAPD

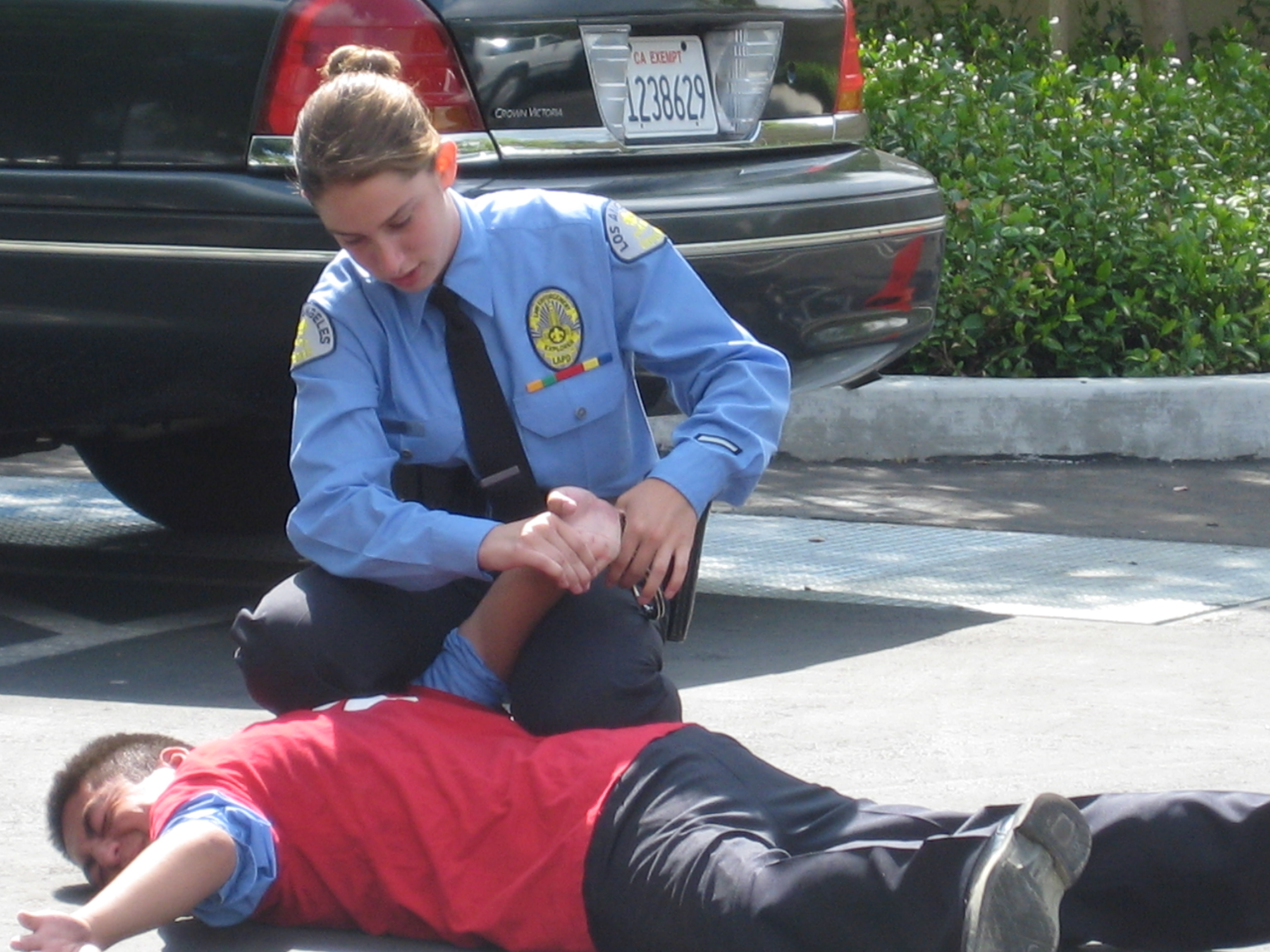
An LAPD cadet conducting a handcuffing drill

The Los Angeles Police Department Cadet Program, known informally as the LAPD Cadets, is a cadet program run and sponsored by the Los Angeles Police Department for youth aged 13 to 17. The cadet program is similar in nature to the police explorer programs that are present in many police departments through the Learning for Life program.

Cadets volunteer in several different ways for the police department, including taking part in ride alongs, crowd control, charity assistance, working in stations, and other tasks. The cadet program has posts at all of the LAPD's 21 regional divisions, South and Central Traffic divisions, LAPD Headquarters, and a post in partnership with the YMCA. The University of Southern California and Los Angeles Airport Police both host affiliated cadet posts as well, and as of 2014 there were 5,000 cadets.

== History ==
The LAPD program was formerly associated with Learning for Life, but it was withdrawn from the program and reorganized as an independent organization in 2007 after the police commission broke off their partnership with the Boy Scouts of America over their policy of barring gays, atheists and agnostics from being troop leaders.

The newer cadet program shifted focus from the old explorer program, which focused primarily on preparing cadets for a career in law enforcement, to a broader program that is designed to give cadets a solid foundation in life and to help them prepare for whatever careers they choose by offering things like tutoring and college scholarships to different cadets in need of assistance. The cadets complete courses not only on law enforcement but also on citizenship, leadership, financial literacy and other different skill sets.

== Membership ==
In order to join the cadet program a person must be between the ages of 13 and 17, maintain a 2.0 grade point average, have no serious criminal record, obtain a medical examination, and complete the cadet academy.

== Organization and Structure ==
Each Cadet Post is run by two Youth Services Officers, who are sworn police officers. At each post, a staff of senior cadets mentors and teaches the more junior cadets. While cadets have, and can promote to, different ranks, cadet rank is designed to provide mentorship and leadership, and cannot issue orders or impose punishment.

| Ranks | Insignia | Notes |
|---|---|---|
| Recruit Cadet | No Insignia | While in the Cadet Academy |
| Cadet I | No insignia | Immediately following graduation from the Cadet Academy |
| Cadet II | No insignia | Automatic promotion to Cadet II following completion of 3 months' probation |
Staff Ranks †
| Cadet III | | At least six months as a Cadet-II to be eligible. |
| Cadet Sergeant | | At least one year as a Cadet-II and/or Cadet-III to be eligible. |
| Cadet Lieutenant | | At least one year as a Cadet-III and/or Cadet Sergeant to be eligible. |
| Cadet Captain | | At least six months in the ranks of Cadet Sergeant and/or Cadet Lieutenant |
| Cadet Commander | | Silver shoulder cord worn on the left shoulder; At least six months as a Cadet Lieutenant and/or Cadet Captain |
| Cadet Chief | | Gold shoulder cord worn on the left shoulder; At least six months as a Cadet Captain or Cadet Commander |
† All ranks from Cadet-III to Cadet Chief require both a written exam and an oral interview.
Rank insignia for Cadet-III and Cadet Sergeant is worn on both sleeves as embroidered chevrons. Rank insignia for Cadet Lieutenant to Cadet Chief is worn as metal, pin-on insignia on the collar.

== Training ==
Recruits must attend the Cadet Leadership Academy, which lasts for thirteen consecutive Saturdays. Recruits learn basic law enforcement skills through classroom learning, physical training, and drill. Classes taught at the academy include criminal law, public speaking, conflict resolution, and demonstrations by SWAT, K-9, and Bomb Squad units.

== Activities ==
Cadets attend meetings once a week for additional training and other law enforcement-related activities. In addition to meeting weekly, cadets volunteer to assist law enforcement officers in coordinating and securing special activities, or take part in additional training opportunities, including:

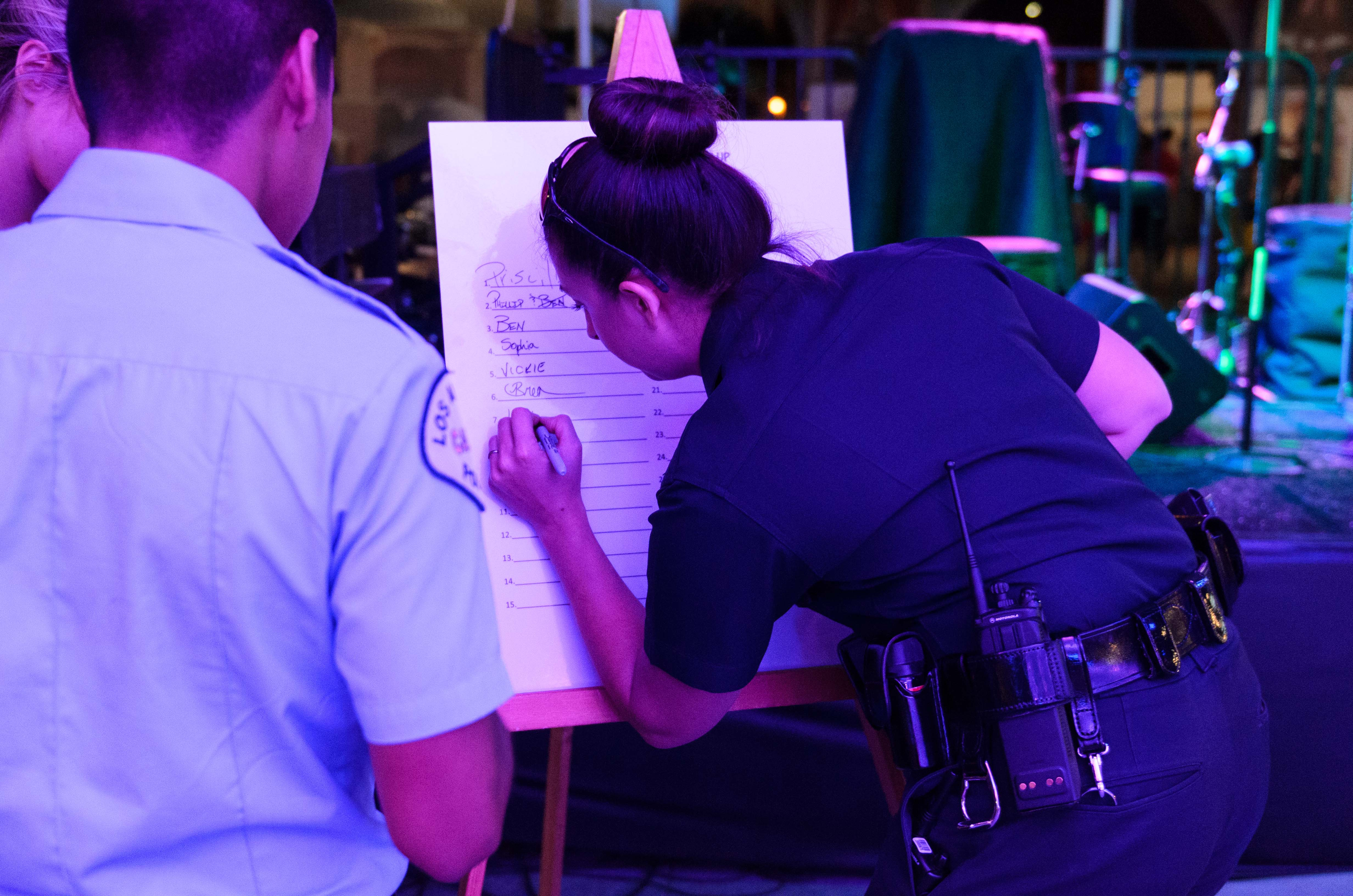
An LAPD officer signs up cadets wanting to compete in a dance contest during the annual Los Angeles Greek Fest in 2013.

- March of Dimes
- Division Picnics/Holiday Parties
- National Night Out
- SWAT Fitness Challenge
- The Academy Awards
- Hollywood Christmas Parade
- LA Marathon
- Dodgers Nights
- Division Vice Operations
- Working at Division front desks
- Officer oriented training for bike patrol

== Controversy ==
In June 2017, three cadets were arrested after they led police in a car chase using stolen department vehicles, and crashed two of them during the pursuit. Investigators later discovered a ring of cadets had been stealing and using department vehicles and other equipment for at least two months prior to their discovery; ultimately, seven cadets were arrested. During the investigation into the thefts, investigators discovered evidence of a sexual relationship between a fifteen year old female cadet, who was one of the cadets arrested for the theft of department property, and a thirty-one year old police officer, who was subsequently arrested and charged with sexual assault. Following the investigation, the sexual assault victim announced her intention to file a suit against the city for negligence.

== See also ==
- California Cadet Corps
