= Seabadge =

Scouting America leadership course

- Seabadge Trident pin and knot
- Owner: Boy Scouts of America
- Country: United States
- Created: 1970
- Awarded for: Completion of the Seabadge leadership course
- Website; Sea Scouting

Seabadge is the advanced leadership and management course for adult leaders of the Boy Scouts of America's Sea Scout program.

== Award ==
The award is a small silver-colored pin-on badge with the Sea Scout emblem (the Boy Scout universal badge over an anchor) superimposed on a trident and surrounded by a laurel wreath. The silver trident within a circle of blue olive leaves is the ancient symbol of Neptune's leadership over his dominions of the sea combined within a circle of friendship. The three prongs of the trident are symbolic of the three purposes of the BSA— citizenship, character and fitness development. The trident also symbolizes that the Seabadge recipient is a spearhead of Sea Scouts in attaining the program objectives of the Boy Scouts of America.

Those who completed the course prior to 2012 were issued a corresponding cloth sew-on square knot insignia, a sea-blue trident on a silver gray background, on the BSA uniform. The Seabadge knot was one of the few that do not actually use a representation of a square knot.

Unofficial knot emblems are still worn by many recipients. These have a contrasting background of tan, green, white, or navy blue to match the uniform shirt. Unofficial emblems featuring two or three tridents to indicate staff and course directors are also available.

== Origins ==
In 1970, a group of experienced Sea Scout leaders met at the Naval Postgraduate School in Monterrey, California. Their goal was to come up with an advanced management training experience for Sea Scout leaders. A curriculum was devised and the first Seabadge conference was held later that year at the U.S. Coast Guard training facility on Governor's Island, Alameda, California. A subsequent conference was held at U.S. Coast Guard Station, Los Angeles, California, and then spread all over the United States. The national committee on Sea Scouts saw the merit in this program and appointed a special subcommittee to gather the best practices of the courses that had been held. The result was the creation of the Seabadge Conference Guide, which is the definitive outline for delivering the Seabadge conference. Since 1970, the course has been revised several times, with the current course revised in 2002.

== Course ==
Seabadge is offered by the four BSA Regions each year. It is delivered as a weekend course to those Sea Scout leaders who have completed basic training for Sea Scout leaders. Trained Scouters in other BSA programs can also take the course. The focus of the course is leadership and management for Sea Scout leaders. It is not meant to be a course in seamanship — this is covered by the basic leader training courses and seamanship courses offered by the US Coast Guard Auxiliary and United States Power Squadron.

Seabadge is awarded after the participant had completed both 1. the weekend classroom program and 2. a set of 5 participant set and advisor approved Sea Scout focused action goals called a 'rutter' 'log' or 'praxis', similar to the 'ticket' in Wood Badge. The second requirement was dropped for a time, but is now again required to complete the course and receive the Seabadge.
