= William I. Koch International Sea Scout Cup =

- Founder: Bill Koch
- Founded: 2002
- Affiliation: Boy Scouts of America
- Website seascoutcup.org

The William I. Koch International Sea Scout Cup is a biannual Sailing Regatta put on by the William I. Koch International Sea Scout Cup Association, Inc. in conjunction with the Sea Scouting (Boy Scouts of America). The event was founded by Bill Koch in 2002 in order to allow Sea Scouts from around the world to compete. The original National Sea Scout Sailing Championship began in the 1930s but went dormant when Sea Scouts left the program to serve in World War II. Today Sea Scouts from around the world gather for a week of friendly competition. Scouts from Australia, Brazil, Denmark, Egypt, England, Finland, Germany, Ireland, Liberia, New Zealand, Norway, Poland, Saudi Arabia, South Africa, Sweden, Trinidad and Tobago, Turkey, and the United States have participated.

== History ==
After nearly half a century since there was a Sea Scout national sailing competition, the Sea Scouts program asked Bill Koch if he would be interested in reviving the championship that had been dormant since World War II. Koch requested that the regatta be open to Scouts from around the world in order to foster international understanding and camaraderie.

== The Koch Cup ==
Bill Koch president of the America³ Foundation, Inc. commissioned Asprey’s of London, the silversmith who made the original America's Cup trophy, to manufacture the William I. Koch International Sea Scout Cup. The trophy referred to as The Koch Cup is made of silver and stands thirty-four inches tall. America³ Foundation, Inc. transferred the Cup to the National Scouting Museum where it is on display in the national Boy Scout Office in Irving, Texas when not on loan to the Koch Cup or the America³ Foundation, Inc.

== Kiwi Cup ==
Teams qualify on the first few days of the cup. Sea Scouts in the top half of the fleet qualify for the Koch Fleet and the rest qualify for the Kiwi Fleet. The Kiwi Cup was donated by the Sea Scouts of New Zealand in 2000. It is an authentic Maori carved statue that is presented to the winners of the Kiwi Fleet.

== Results ==
Year	Location	Host	Winner of Koch Cup	Winner of Kiwi Cup
2002	Chicago, IL	Columbia Yacht Club	(United States) Thomas Hartman and Trevor Gurley	(United States) P Cotera and J Cotera
2004	Buzzards Bay, MA	Massachusetts Maritime Academy	(United States) Trevor Gurley and Corey Kemp	(Norway) Erling Guderud and Siri Neslein
2006	Miami, FL	Coral Reef Yacht Club	(United States) Corey Kemp and John Harada	(United States) Andrew Scheuermann and Danielle Meeker
2008	Annapolis, MD	United States Naval Academy	(United States) Patrick Arrington	(United States) Eric Johnson and Levi White
2010	New London, CT	United States Coast Guard Academy	(United States) Cody Stansky and Andrew Britton	(United States) Barchan Rodgers and Abby King
2012	Vallejo, CA	California Maritime Academy	(United States) Jack Donnell and Brooke Stinson	(United States) Mathew Rozario and Colin Bartels
2014	Long Beach, CA	Long Beach Yacht Club	(United States) Ben Brough and Laura Roudebush	(United States) Andrew Berkowitz and Isabella Rudrow
2016	Long Beach, CA	Long Beach Yacht Club	(New Zealand) Nicholas Gardiner and Nicholas Williams	(United States) Teagan Foley and Mick Foley
2018	Galveston, TX	Sea Star Base Galveston	(United States) Max Katz-Christy and Thomas Craciun	(United States) Robert Gustke and Andrew York
2020	Galveston, TX	Sea Star Base Galveston	Canceled due to COVID‐19Pandemic	
