= Law Enforcement Exploring =

American education program for youth in law enforcement

- Owner: Learning for Life
- Country: United States
- Founded: July 12, 1973
- Website https://www.exploring.org/law-enforcement

Law Enforcement Exploring, commonly referred to as Police Explorers or Police Scouts, is an American vocational education program that allows youth to explore a career in law enforcement by working with local law enforcement agencies. Founded on July 12, 1973, it is one of the Exploring programs from Learning for Life, a non-Scouting affiliate of the Boy Scouts of America. The program is generally available to qualified young adults who have graduated from 8th grade and are between the ages of 14 and 21.

== Organization ==
=== National ===
Learning for Life (LFL) coordinates the Law Enforcement Exploring program at the national level. LFL provides resources, including advisor training, sample policies, and insurance. LFL also hosts a biannual conference and competition, the National Law Enforcement Explorer Conference.

=== Local ===
A local law enforcement agency charters local explorer programs. At least one officer from that agency serves as the post's "Advisor". This advisor is responsible for department-level administration of the program and ensuring that the program meets the department's objectives.

Most posts maintain a command structure mirroring that of the hosting agency.

== Activities and training ==
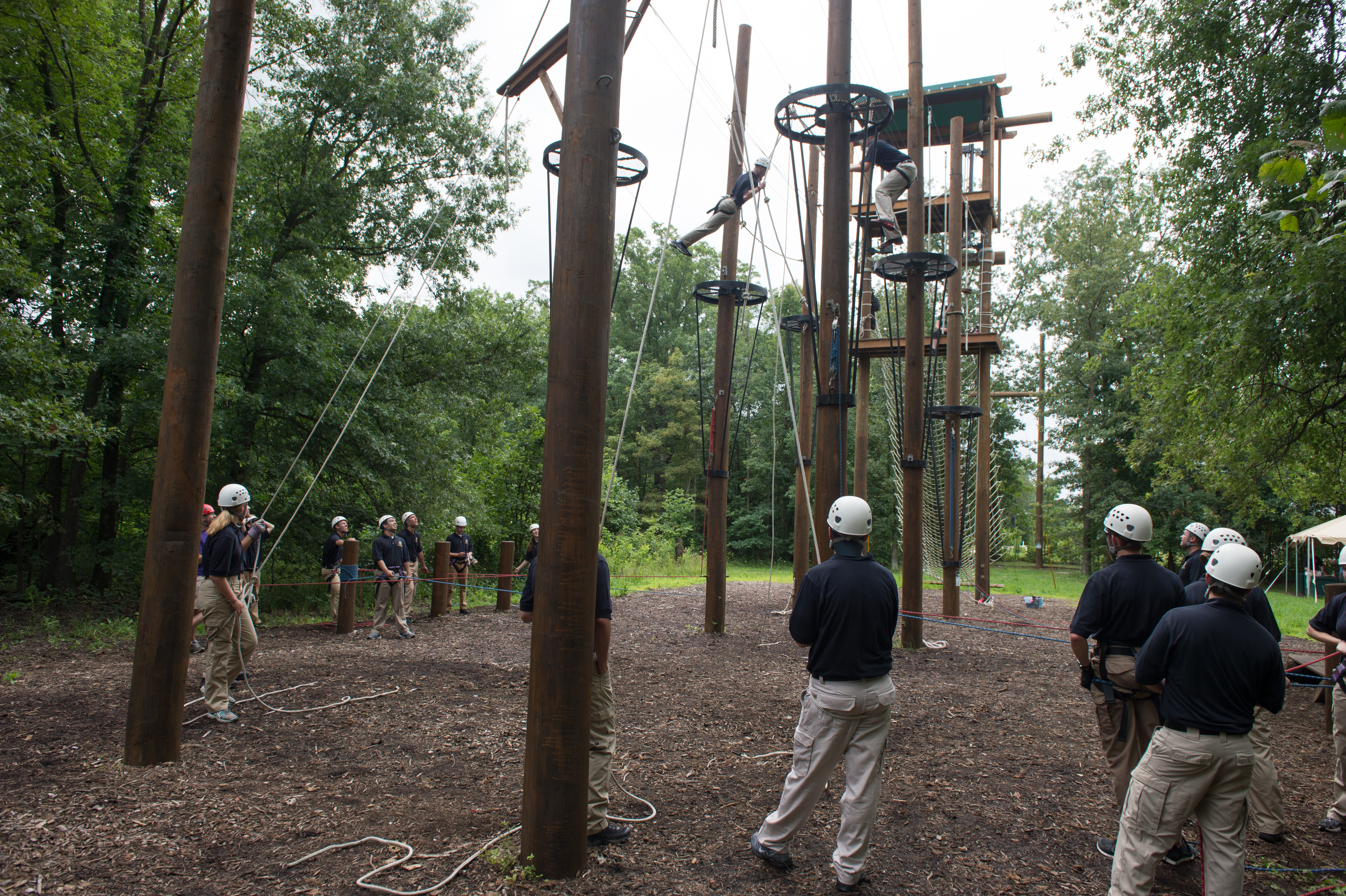
Explorers navigating an obstacle course in Washington, D.C., 2015

Each post is unique, and the activities of each depend on their specific department's policies and guidelines. Typical activities include:

- Weekly or bi-monthly administrative and training
- Patrol "ride-alongs" (Some Posts require the Explorers participating to be 18 years or older and participate as private citizens)
- Community Service
- Tactical training
- Honor guards
- Search and Rescue (ESAR posts specialize in this)
- Radio procedure (how to properly use police radios)
- Arrests and use of force
- Traffic stops
- Building searches
- Crime scene investigations
- Crisis/hostage negotiations
- Report writing
- Domestic crises
- Emergency first aid & CPR/AED/officer down
- White collar crime
- Active shooter response
- Field intoxication tests

Since the September 11 attacks, some Explorer posts have focused their training on counter-terrorism, border patrol, drug raids, hostage negotiation, and active shooter areas, while still teaching the above-listed areas.

=== Academy ===
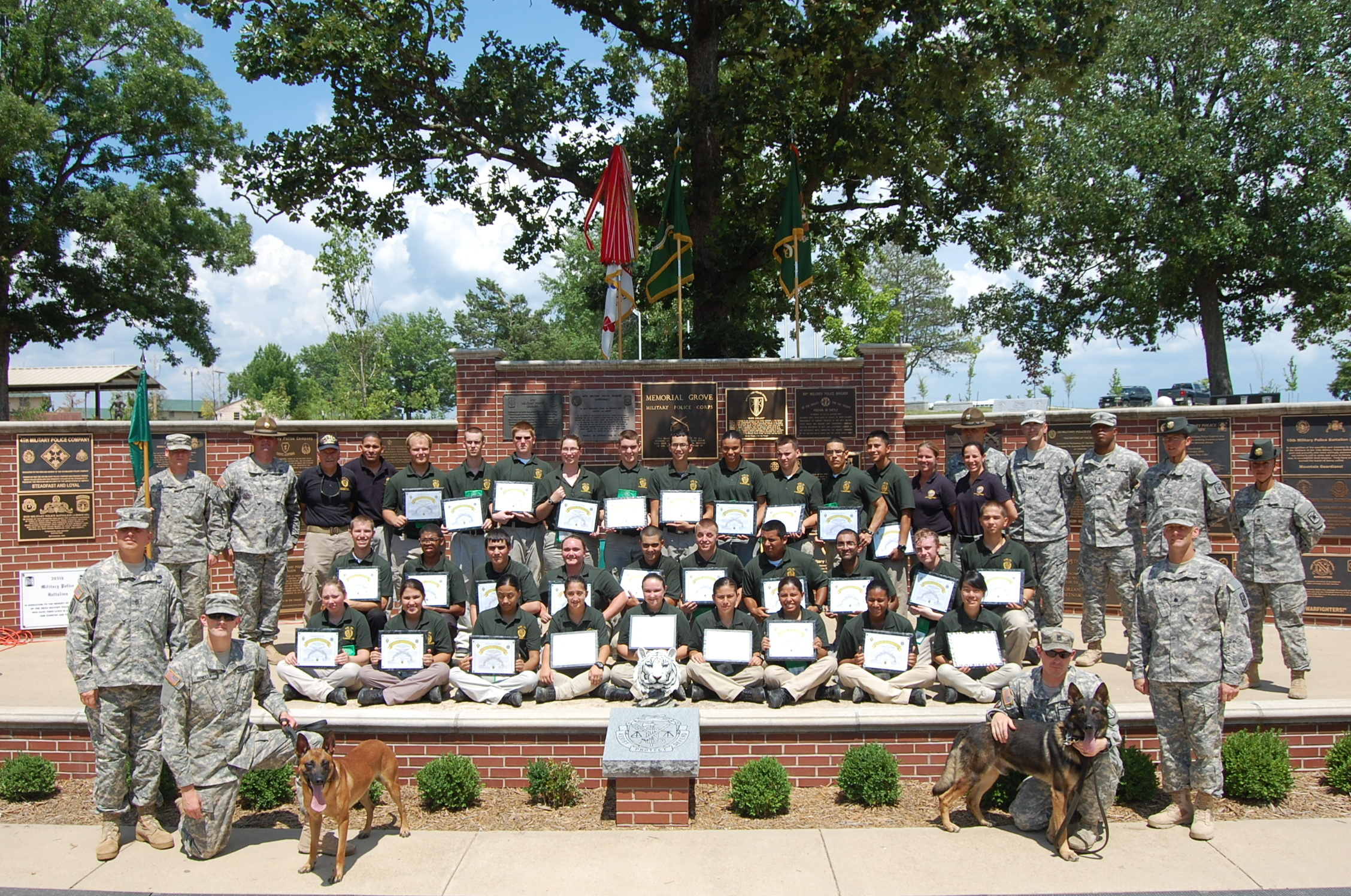
Graduates of the National Law Enforcement Explorer Academy at Fort Leonard Wood, 2013

In some areas of the country, Explorers may attend an Explorer Academy, typically on consecutive weekends or for a week, to receive training and discipline similar to that of a real law enforcement academy. The academy ends with a graduation ceremony where certificates (such as CPR certification) and awards are given.

Some systems may provide different levels of academic training, such as:

- Basic (Complete overview of basic law enforcement)
- Advanced (with rotating topic each academy, or simply more in-depth training on various topics)
- Explorer Administrative Assistants (EAA's assist in the running of academies and assist with training)
- Selection (Either to prepare for a leadership position within the post or to prepare for the actual hiring process)
- Academy Police Department (Explorers apply, and are selected to join the APD. This course will simulate what it is like to work for a law enforcement agency for a week, using mock scenes to challenge the Explorers)
- Ride Along (Explorers learn how to safely ride alongside a police officer serving on their patrol shift. They learn where to stand on traffic stops and how to react in high-stress situations. They are also taught when and when not to get out of the patrol car, depending on the severity of the call.)

Post advisers instruct a majority of the Explorer Training, including Academies.

== Activities ==
=== Public events ===
Public services offer Explorers the opportunity to engage with the community in a public setting. Events range from crowd control at parades, to providing security and uniformed presence at events like fairs and sporting events, and directing traffic during mass traffic floods, such as those following sporting and other civic events.

=== Conferences and competition ===
Every other year, Learning for Life hosts a National Law Enforcement Explorer Conference, which includes role-playing scenarios that law enforcement officers regularly encounter, seminars, and networking opportunities.

Depending on the regional structure, explorers may compete several times annually. They perform the skills they have learned (such as traffic stops, building searches, marksmanship, and arrests) in the form of scenarios. They are graded by judges against fellow explorers from the region, country, and sometimes the world.

== Awards and recognition ==
Explorers are eligible for awards and scholarships offered through Learning for Life, as well as local and regional Explorer organizations.

== Criticism ==
=== Sexual abuse ===
Since the mid-1970s, there have been over 190 reported cases of police officers grooming, sexually abusing, or engaging in inappropriate behavior with Explorers, the vast majority of whom were underage girls. Such incidents have occurred in at least 66 police departments.

Investigation by the Marshall Project has revealed that lack of oversight is common in the program, and that in many cases, armed police officers are allowed to be alone with teenagers. Learning for Life has created a set of rules governing the Explorer program, which includes a non-fraternization policy between officers (or "adult leaders") and Explorers. However, it leaves oversight to individual departments. There are no reported cases of Learning for Life revoking a police department's ability to operate an Explorer program over failed oversight leading to one or several incidents of sexual abuse.

The Boy Scouts of America hired Michael Johnson, a former detective, as the national director of youth protection in 2010. He became alarmed by the sexual abuse taking place in the Explorers program, and stated that, "[mentors] have these Explorers with them riding around at night and the officers do a nonexistent-to-poor job of maintaining clear boundaries."

==== Serial abuse by officers in St. Petersburg, Florida ====
In 1996, John Ferraro, a police officer and mentor in the Explorers program, was accused of sexually abusing a 16-year-old girl. He died by suicide soon after the allegations surfaced, and in the note he left behind, he wrote, "I'm not the only person who's having sex with a minor at the police department... They really need to tighten up the rules." An outside investigation sparked by the allegations against Ferraro revealed that 11 officers in the departments near St. Petersburg, Florida had sexually abused or raped Explorers in the previous ten years.

==== Serial abuse by Sergeant Vince Ariaz ====
Sergeant Vince Ariaz ran the Brownwood, Texas, Police Department's Explorer program in the 2000s. In 2004, a 15-year-old Explorer came forward and alleged that Ariaz had sexually abused her one night when they were at the station house alone. She also claimed that he had sent her text messages "bragging about the size of his penis and how he intended to use it on her." Ariaz was not removed after the girl's report. In 2007, Ariaz began sexually abusing another 15-year-old Explorer. He was arrested after a Texas Ranger set up a hidden camera to catch Ariaz in the act of sexual abuse. He was sentenced to 20 years in prison. The City of Brownwood paid the victim's family $300,000 in a settlement.

==== Murder of Sandra Birchmore ====
In 2024, former Explorers mentor and Stoughton Police Department detective Matthew Farwell was indicted on charges that he murdered former Explorer Sandra Birchmore and attempted to cover up her death by staging her suicide. Birchmore joined the Explorers program at age 12. Farwell allegedly used his position as a mentor in the program to groom, sexually exploit, and eventually sexually abuse Birchmore from the age of 15 up until her death at age 23. When Birchmore informed Farwell that she was pregnant with his child in 2021, the charges allege that he killed her and staged the scene as suicide by hanging. The Office of the Chief Medical Examiner for Massachusetts initially ruled the cause of death a suicide. Subsequent pathologists and experts who reviewed Sandra Birchmore's autopsy report concluded that the findings were not consistent with the position the body was found in. A 2022 internal investigation by Stoughton police found that two other officers involved in the Explorers program, including the veteran who ran the program, also sexually abused Birchmore.

=== Post disbandments ===
In 2000, Los Angeles City Council voted unanimously to disband the Los Angeles Police Department's Explorer Program due to the Scouts of America's policies (at the time) prohibiting homosexual, atheist, or agnostic members, which violated city laws preventing associations with businesses that discriminate. The LAPD replaced their program with the Cadet Program in 2007.

In September 2015, Fox Lake, Illinois disbanded the Fox Police Explorers Post 300 following the staged suicide of Joe Gliniewicz, the head of the group who had been embezzling money from it, among other crimes.

== In popular culture ==
In the 1971 Adam-12 episode "Pick-Up", a group of LAPD Explorers manage to apprehend a robbery suspect.

In an episode of Law and Order: Special Victims Unit, a member of the New York City Police Department Law Enforcement Explorers program jeopardizes, but then saves, a criminal case against a serial rapist.

In an episode of Blue Bloods, a group of NYPD Law Enforcement Explorers is seen attending presentations hosted by Frank and Jamie Reagan concerning the career of law enforcement.

In an episode of Chicago PD, Officer Roman talks to some youths about the Law Enforcement program. Officer Roman later tells fellow officers that he started his law enforcement career in this program, and it saved his life.

== See also ==
- Aviation Career Exploring
- Fire Service Exploring
- Health Career Exploring
- Explorer Search and Rescue
- Exploring
