= National Boatswain =

National Sea Scout Boatswain
- Owner: Scouting America
- Created: May 1979
- Website seascout.org

The National Boatswain is the leading youth member of Sea Scouts program of Scouting America. The National Boatswain is a member of the National Sea Scout Committee and the Scouting America Executive Board.

== National Sea Scout Boatswain ==
Year	Name
2025-2026	Abbey Holloman
2024-2025	Gabi Furnans
2023-2024	Evan Nazareth
2022-2023	Jewell Norris
2021-2022	Cassidy Christian
2020-2021	Aven Alexander
2019-2020	Hannah Carter
2018-2019	Jack Otto
2017-2018	Mercedes Matlock
2016–2017	Rachel West
2015–2016	Edward Campbell
2014–2015	Peter Schmidt
2013–2014	William McElligott
2012–2013	Matthew Miller
2011–2012	Eva Hogan
2010–2011	Vanya Keys
2009–2010	Connor Rieve
2008–2009	Monica Traylor
2007–2008	Doug Bowman
2006–2007	David George
2005–2006	Jesse Milton
2004–2005	James Houghton
2003–2004	Christopher A. Kerzich
2002–2003	Cyrus Lawyer
2001–2002	Katie S. Hagen
2000–2001	Yukitoshi Murasaki
1999–2000	Christopher Sokolov
