= Aviation management =

Discipline in aviation

Aviation management is a study discipline responsible for coordinating operations at an Airport and airline management or other business in the airline industry. Professionals in this discipline specialize in various fields, such as flight logistics, aircraft maintenance, customer service and marketing for the airline.
