= Venturing Leadership Award =

- Venturing Leadership Award
- Country: USA
- Created: 2004
- Awarded for: Outstanding service to Venturing

The Venturing Leadership Award is presented by councils, areas, regions, and the National Council of the Scouting America to Venturers and Venturing Advisors who have made exceptional contributions to Venturing and who exemplify the Scout Oath and Scout Law.

The Venturing Leadership Award was briefly unavailable to adult recipients, but has been restored as a recognition for adults as of the 2015 National Annual Meeting of the Boy Scouts of America.

== Recipients of the National Venturing Leadership Award ==
Recipients of the National Venturing Leadership Award
Year	Name	Affiliation	Age
2025	Helen Lockwood	CST 4	Adult
2025	MaryBeth Choconas	CST 15	Adult
2025	Sara Yeung	CST 3	Youth
2025	Aiden Wells	CST 15	Youth
2025	Alyssa Ross	CST 14	Youth
2025	Katie Chatow	CST 3	Youth
2024	Tom McDonald	CST 8	Adult
2024	Patrick Jaime	CST 3	Adult
2024	Robert Avery	CST 12	Adult
2024	Hannah Todd	CST 15	Youth
2024	Jacob Schmidt	CST 4	Youth
2024	Andrea Marron Leycegui	CST 16	Youth
2024	Ryanne Fisher	CST 12	Youth
2023	Nathan Vick	NST 14	Adult
2023	Douglas Taylor	NST 15	Adult
2023	Natalie MacEwen	NST 3	Adult
2023	micah Vocco	NST 4	Youth
2023	Olivia Townsend	NST 16	Youth
2023	Jamey Schnasse	NST 3	Youth
2023	Gahn Mungardnee	NST 14	Youth
2023	kaitlyn Bishop	NST 12	Youth
2022	Gail Plucker	NST 14	Adult
2022	Bernie Lockard	NST 12	Adult
2022	Richard Kagawa	NST 3	Adult
2022	Tanadet Itsarapakdetam	NST 3	Adult
2022	Steve Garner	NST 9	Adult
2022	Cynthia Cyrus	NST 14	Adult
2022	Miciah Thacker	NST 9	youth
2022	Freedom Tansley	NST 11	Youth
2022	Nicole Steele	NST 3	Youth
2022	Steven Soto	NST 3	Youth
2022	Carnia Landgraf	NST 16	Youth
2022	Tera Izadi	NST 3	Youth
2021	Jamie Shearer	Northeast	Adult
2021	Gordon Leary	Northeast	Adult
2021	Brenna Leary	Northeast	Adult
2021	Elizabeth Finley	Western	Adult
2021	Juliana Murillo	Western	Youth
2021	Andrew Steckner	Central	Youth
2021	Amy Hermann	Southern	Youth
2021	Samantha Troiano	Northeast	Youth
2020	Natalie Nichols	Central	Youth
2020	Tyler Grey	Western	Youth
2020	Ryan Davis	Southern	Youth
2020	Lyndsey Nedrow	Southern	Youth
2020	Ella Hirsch	Southern	Youth
2020	Clare Toman	Northeast	Youth
2020	April McMillan	Southern	Adult
2020	Bob Sirhal	Northeast	Adult
2020	David Bush	Southern	Adult
2020	Jim Lynch	Southern	Adult
2020	Julie Dalton	Central	Adult
2019	Pamela Petterchak	Central	Youth
2019	Reece Kilbey	Western	Youth
2019	Jake Brillhart	Southern	Youth
2019	Katelyn St. Louis	Northeast	Youth
2019	Hannah Wheaton	Southern	Youth
2019	Scott Sorrels	Southern	Adult
2019	Aaron Parks-Young	Southern	Adult
2019	Sherry McGugin	Southern	Adult
2018	Lydia Borah	Southern	Youth
2018	Savannah McMillan	Southern	Youth
2018	Dominic Wolters	Central	Youth
2018	Ripley Price	Northeast	Youth
2018	Robbie DiBiagio	Northeast	Adult
2018	Jack Furst	Southern	Adult
2018	Jennifer Hancock	Southern	Adult
2018	Jeff Geralds	Central	Adult
2017	Christopher Mausshardt	Central	Youth
2017	Michelle Merritt	Northeast	Youth
2017	Erik Saderholm	Northeast	Youth
2017	Katie Schneider	Western	Youth
2017	Cathie Seebauer	Central	Youth
2017	Nate Steele	Central	Youth
2017	Russ Hunsaker	Western	Adult
2017	Andrew Miller	Northeast	Adult
2016	Shannon Mulligan	Western	Youth
2016	Pratik Vaidya	Western	Youth
2016	Christina Vogt	Central	Youth
2016	Bob Scott	National Council	Adult
2016	Wendy Kurten	National Council	Adult
2015	Emily Mausshardt	Central	Youth
2015	Peter Schmidt	Central	Youth
2015	Edward Abraham	Western	Youth
2015	Rachel Eddowes	Southern	Youth
2015	Elizabeth Wisman	Central	Youth
2015	Ken King	Central	Adult
2015	Ken Bower	Western	Adult
2015	John Kennedy	Northeast	Adult
2015	Peter Self	National Council	Adult
2015	Don Shepard	National Council	Adult
2015	Jessica Ayala-Janscha	National Council	Adult
2015	Keith Christopher	National Council	Adult
2015	Angela Elliott	National Council	Adult
2014	Maddie Culwell	Southern	Youth
2014	Jillian Infusino	Western	Youth
2014	Billy McElligott	Southern	Youth
2014	Gerry Souser	Northeast	Youth
2013	Annaliese Parker	Western	Youth
2013	Sarah Mittrucker	Central	Youth
2013	Cara Sepcoski	Northeast	Youth
2012	Christine Luczka	Northeast	Youth
2012	Josh Nolan	Southern	Youth
2012	Dustin Readenour	Central	Youth
2012	Brent Uberty	Western	Youth
2012	Iris Ramos	Western	Youth
2012	Stephanie Soto	Western	Youth
2011	Dan Carriveau	Central	Youth
2011	Gina Curtis	Northeast	Youth
2011	David Frolander		Youth
2011	Mackenzie Lardie	Western	Youth
2010	Jennifer Lowe	Western	Youth
2010	Kalla French	Southern	Youth
2010	Amy Clark	Northeast	Youth
2010	Ben Hayes	Central	Youth
2010	Connor Rieve		Youth
2009	Katelyn A. Childs	Central	Youth
2009	Monica Traylor		Youth
2009	Kyla Mahoney	Northeast	Youth
2009	John D. Washburn	Southern	Youth
2009	Matthew McGroarty	Western	Youth
2009	Keith Gehlhausen	Central	Adult
2008	Doug Bowman		Youth
2008	Amanda Vogt	Central	Youth
2008	Andria Neff	Northeast	Youth
2008	Thomas Joyce	Southern	Youth
2008	Dana Friede	Western	Youth
2008	Roger Bast		Adult
2008	Greg Taylor		Adult
2008	Jim Virgin	Western	Adult
2008	Joseph Vollmer	Central	Adult
2007	Charles A. Thorpe	Southern	Adult
2007	Marion Rice		Adult
2007	Dr. Tom Mildenhall		Adult
2007	Jim Smith		Adult
2007	Tim Beaty		Adult
2007	Charles W. Dahlquist II	Western	Adult
2007	Kevin ‘Kip’ Peterson		Adult
2007	Aaron Stockwell	Northeast	Youth
2007	Michael R. Bebeau	Southern	Youth
2007	Christopher Szybisty	Central	Youth
2007	Robyn L. Knoll	Western	Youth
2007	David George		Youth
2007	Dana McRae		Adult
2007	Dan Wilson		Adult
2007	Michael Roan Walker		Adult
2006	Craig Burkhardt	Central	Adult
2006	Paul Dillon	Central	Adult
2006	John F. Smith		Adult
2006	Ian Cheesman	Central	Adult
2006	Dr. Michael Barrett		Adult
2006	Jess Rumburg		Youth
2006	Marguerite Belli	Southern	Youth
2006	Paul Robert Lee	Central	Youth
2006	Brian Casper		Youth
2006	Jesse Milton	Central	Youth
2006	Roberta L. Dougherty		Adult
2005	J. Stephen Fossett	Central	Adult
2005	James Houghton		Youth
2005	Amy Frantz	Northeast	Youth
2005	Lee Y. Barrera	Southern	Youth
2005	Bridget M. Degel	Central	Youth
2005	Amara (Amy) Cramer DiFrancesco	Western	Youth
2005	David A. Wilson	Western	Adult
2005	Richard B. Cuciti		Adult
2005	Rhoda Clayton		Adult
2004	Theodore H. Smith		Youth
2004	Christopher A. Kerzich	Central	Youth
2004	Danielle Bird	Northeast	Youth
2004	Randall Porch	Southern	Youth
2004	Iris Kalkofen	Central	Youth
2004	Joshua Green	Western	Youth
2004	William Robinson	Central	Adult
2004	Walter E. Whitacre		Adult
2004	Dorothy R. Brown		Adult
2004	William W. Daggett		Adult
2004	Wm. Lee Popham		Adult
2004	Carl Shellhorn		Adult
2004	C. Ben Jelsema		Adult
2003	Charles J. Holmes	National Council	Adult
2003	Gregory Carstens		Adult
2003	Signe Rogers	Central	Adult
2003	Clayton Cranor		Adult
2003	Matt Szramoski		Adult
2003	Sam Stocker		Youth
2003	Cyrus Lawyer IV		Youth
2003	Thomas Southard	Northeast	Youth
2003	Thomas Franklin	Southern	Youth
2003	Nathan Petrusak	Central	Youth
2003	Melisa A. Bures	Western	Youth
2003	Raymond Derk	Central	Adult
2003	Susan Derk	Central	Adult
2003	Cassie Johnson		Adult
2002	Rod Mortensen		Adult
2002	Jin Matsumoto		Adult
2002	Francesca Anne Scanio	Southern	Youth
2002	Christine Lynne Capen	Northeast	Youth
2002	Robert Rescot	Central	Youth
2002	Marissa Morgan	Central	Youth
2002	Timothy Burchett	Western	Youth
2002	Katie Hagen		Youth
2002	Kerry Cheesman	Central	Adult
2002	William James		Adult
2002	Ryck Lydecker		Adult
2002	Bradley D. Harris		Adult
2001	Katherine ‘Kate’ Knuth	Central	Youth
2001	Kelly McGovern	Northeast	Youth
2001	James 'Wesley' Miller	Southern	Youth
2001	Kristopher J. Zahrobsky	Central	Youth
2001	Daniel H. Bronstein	Western	Youth
2001	Robert Legg		Adult
2001	Bruce Johnson		Adult
2001	F. Melvin Hammond		Adult
2001	R. William Evans	National Council	Adult
2001	Ronald L. Sunker		Adult
2001	Jeremiah M. Crabtree		Adult
2000	Dr. Richards S. Miller	Southern	Adult
2000	Ed Burke, Jr		Adult
2000	Donna Cunningham	Southern	Adult
2000	Larry Cunningham	Southern	Adult
2000	Jimmie Homburg		Adult
2000	Bob Soldivera		Adult
2000	Jonathan Fulkerson	Central	Adult
2000	James Wells	Southern	Youth
2000	Gavin Svensen	Northeast	Youth
2000	Chad King	Central	Youth
2000	Christopher K. Sokolov		Adult
2000	Robert French		Adult
2000	Sylvester Tan		Adult
2000	Jim Elroy		Adult
2000	James A. Umberger		Adult

== See also ==
- Advancement and recognition in the Boy Scouts of America
