= National Venturing President =

- Owner: Scouting America
- Created: August 8, 1998
- National Venturing President: Shreemann Patel
- National Venturing Advisor: Savannah McMillan
- National Venturing Chair: Rick Bausher
- Website https://venturing.org

The National Venturing president is the leading youth member of Venturing, BSA and is a voting member of the Executive Board of the National Council of Scouting America.

President
2026–2027	Shreemann Patel

Past National Venturing President
2025-2026	Aidan Wells
2024–2025	Andrea Marron
2023–2024	Jamey Schnasse
2022–2023	Tara Izadi
2021–2022	Andrew Steckner
2020–2021	Tyler Grey
2019–2020	Pamela Petterchak
2018–2019	Dominic Wolters
2017–2018	Michelle Merritt
2016–2017	Pratik Vaidya
2015–2016	Edward Abraham
2014–2015	Maddie Culwell
2013–2014	Annaliese Parker
2012–2013	Dustin Readenour
2011–2012	Daniel Carriveau
2010–2011	Jennifer Lowe
2009–2010	Matthew McGroaty
2008–2009	Amanda Vogt
2007–2008	David George
2006–2007	Marguerite Belli
2005–2006	Amara Cramer DiFrancesco
2004–2005	Christpher A. Kerzich
2003–2004	Thomas Franklin
2002–2003	Sam Stocker
2001–2002	Marissa Morgan
2000–2001	Katherine Knuth
1998–2000	Jon Fulkerson
