= Sea Scouts (Scouting America) =

Coed program of Scouting America for ages 14 to 20

- Owner: Scouting America
- Age range: 13 through 20 years
- Country: United States
- Founded: 1912
- Founders: Arthur A. Carey; Charles T. Longstreth
- National Commodore: Salvatore Ciampo
- National Boatswain: Gabi Furnans
Previous; Scouts BSA	Next; Venturing
- Website seascout.org
- Dark Navy shirt and trousers

Sea Scouts is a program of the Scouting America for coeducational teenagers and young adults ages 14 (or 13 and have completed the eighth grade) through 20.

== Aims and principles ==
In addition to the Scout Oath and Law, Sea Scouts also subscribe to the Sea Promise.

=== Sea Promise ===
As a Sea Scout, I promise to do my best:
To guard against water accidents
To know the location and proper use of the lifesaving devices on every boat I board
To be prepared to render aid to those in need
To let those less able come first.

== Organization ==
The ship is the fundamental unit of Sea Scouts, consisting of five or more Sea Scouts and the adult leaders. Ships are numbered and may adopt a name.

Each ship is sponsored by a community organization such as a business, service organization, private school, labor group or religious institution. The chartered organization is responsible for providing a meeting place and promoting a good program. A chartered organization representative manages the relationship between the ship, the chartered organization, and the BSA.

The ship committee is a group of adults, led by the ship committee chair, who guide the ship program and activities and manage record keeping, finance, leadership recruitment and registration. The ship is led by youths who are elected to the positions of boatswain, boatswain's mate, crew leader, assistant crew leader, yeoman, purser, and storekeeper. Skipper and mate provide guidance while allowing the youth to lead the ship.

Above the ship level, committees are organized to support the program at the Council, Territory, and National level.

Annually, the Sea Scouts National Office in conjunction with the Boat Owners Association of the US (BoatUS) award several ships the honor of being apart of the National Flagship Fleet. BoatU.S. created the award in 2002 to mark the 90th anniversary of Sea Scouts. It is presented in recognition of excellence in program quality, youth achievement, and adult commitment.

== History ==
Sea Scouts is the BSA's implementation of the Sea Scout program, initially developed in 1910 by Warington Baden-Powell in England. The founders of Sea Scouts in the United States are Arthur A. Carey of Waltham, Massachusetts, and Charles T. Longstreth of Philadelphia, Pennsylvania. Both leaders independently established Sea Scout groups in the summer of 1912. This accomplishment was recorded in the inaugural issue of Scouting.

In 2016, Sea Scouts became an independent program within the BSA. From 1998 to 2016, it had been part of Venturing, and prior to that part of Exploring.

In 2018, Sea Scouts was designated as the official youth program of the U.S. Coast Guard Auxiliary.

== Uniform and insignia ==
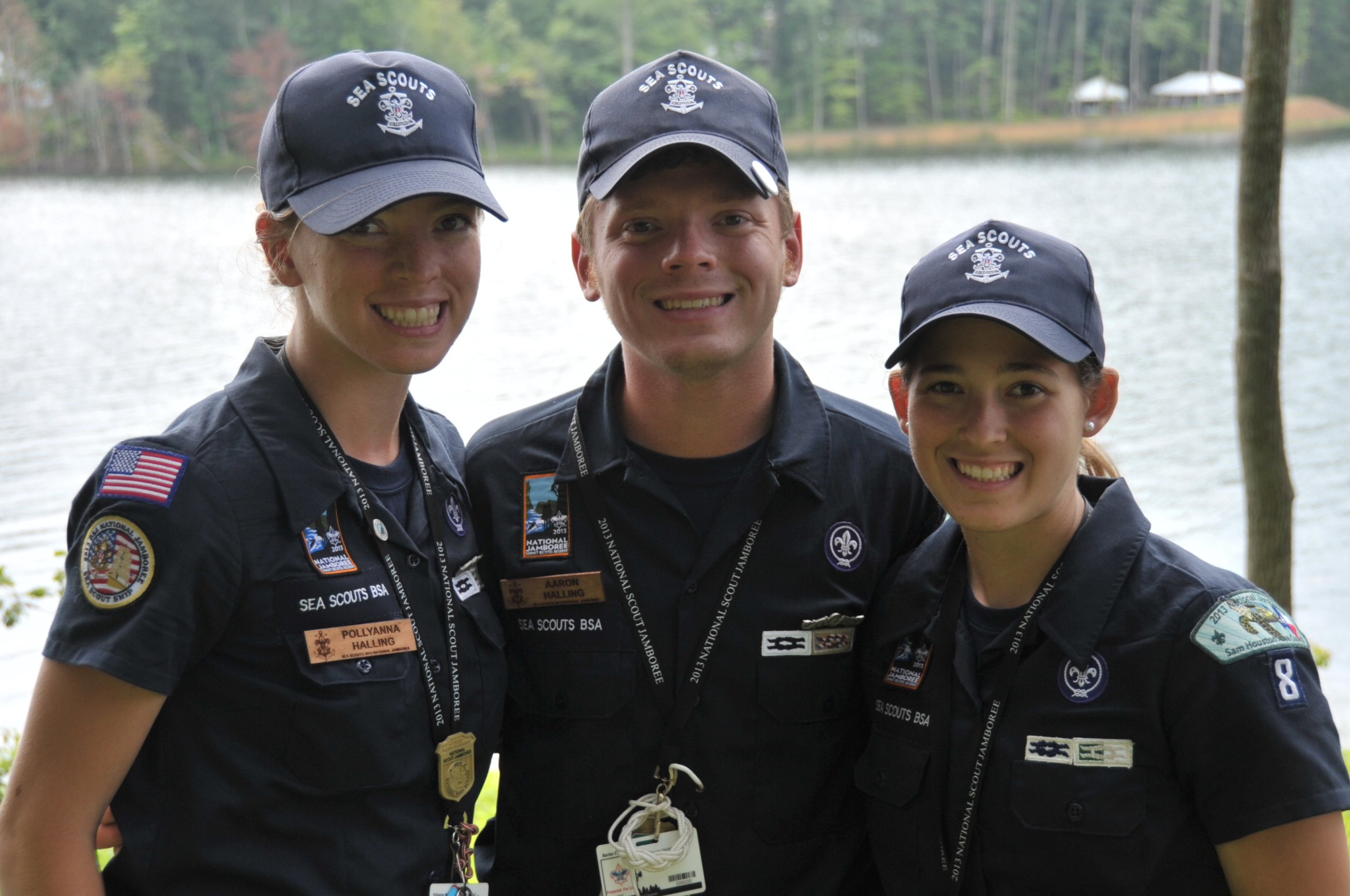

Ship Officers
Boatswain, boatswain mate, crew leader, assistant crew leader,
yeoman, purser, storekeeper, specialist
Ship Leaders
Skipper, mate, committee chair, committee member
Council Leadership
Commodore, committee, boatswain

In 2012, the National Sea Scout Committee introduced the Official Sea Scout Uniform, previously known as the New Century Universal Uniform. This universal uniform is the same for youth and adults as well as men and women. It is flexible enough to be used as an all purpose uniform and is authorized for wear at National Events. The uniform is made up of a dark blue shirt, dark blue pants, a black ball cap or the traditional "Dixie Cup" hat, an optional dark blue neckerchief or "Tar Flap" neckerchief (youth only), a black belt, and black shoes.

Insignia are as follows:

- The local council shoulder patch (CSP) is worn on the left sleeve just as it is worn on other Scout uniforms.
- Below the CSP, the ship numerals are worn. Below the numerals the badge of office is worn. Below the badge of office is the Long Cruise patch, with segments in red and white for addition cruises (red=1 additional award, white=5 additional awards).
- On the right sleeve the U.S. Flag patch is worn.
- Below the flag, the ship's emblem or standard Sea Scout emblem is worn is worn. The ship emblem, unique to each unit, has the ship's name, number, and location (city & state) on it. If the individual works above the ship level, the standard Sea Scout emblem is always worn.
- Above the left breast pocket, Sea Scouts and leaders can wear up to six square knots or five pin-on medals, with the badge of rank being worn on the pocket itself. The Sea Scout Experience Advanced Leadership (SEAL) training pin is worn above the knots.
- Above the right breast pocket, the "SEA SCOUTS BSA" strip is worn. The nametag being worn above it. The Seabadge pin is worn above the nametag.

=== Legacy Uniforms and Insignia ===
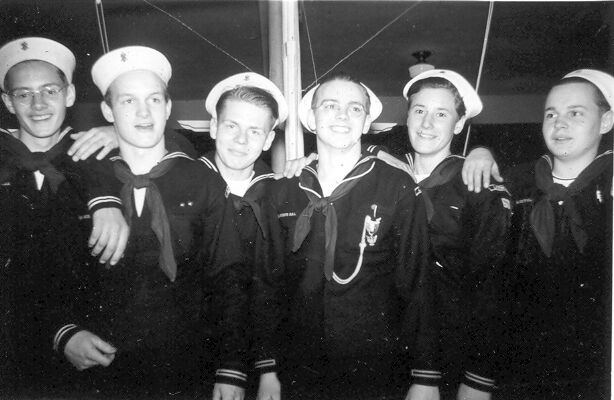
Sea Scout uniforms from 1923 to 2012

Traditional Sea Scout Uniforms, based on modified US Navy uniforms, were standardized by Commander Thomas J. Keane, a U.S. Naval Officer, who revamped Sea Scouts in the mid-1920s.

The legacy youth uniform resembled US Navy enlisted-style uniform: the so-called "Cracker Jack" uniforms in white or navy blue. To avoid confusion with Naval personnel, changes are made to these uniforms.

The legacy adult uniform resembled US Navy officer-style uniform: the dress blue and summer whites. A white combination cap is worn with blues and whites. The wearing of adult uniforms is optional for those with the Quartermaster rank. If worn, the uniform is worn in the same manner as that of a Navy Chief Petty Officer.

The position of adult or youth leaders was indicated by insignia that uses the Sea Scout Badge (Boy Scout First Class badge superimposed on an anchor) or the Boatswain's insignia, and a combination of and stars to indicate the level. All badges are white on blue for navy blues, adult khaki and dungarees, and blue on white for whites. One does not wear contrasting insignia on the uniforms. On the collar of the adult's khaki uniform, the adult wear "collar marks", showing position of office, in the same manner as that of US Navy officers. On the shoulders of adult summer white uniform, black soft shoulder epaulet covers are worn on the shirt's epaulets. These have the position of office embroidered.

The level of a Scouter is indicated by the stars.

- 1 star (★) is ship level
- 2 stars (★★) is council level
- 4 stars (★★★★) is National level

With the publication of the 2012 Sea Scout Manual, the rope diamond and rope oval around the Sea Scout emblem were discontinued for the committee chairman and committee member respectively. All adult leadership above the Ship level use the standard Sea Scout Badge no matter their position. At the ship level, the Skipper is indicated by a star and bar (★▮) below the Sea Scout badge, while the mate (Skipper's assistant leaders), have just a star (★).

== Advancement ==
Sea Scout ranks: Apprentice, Ordinary, Able, Quartermaster

The Sea Scout rank system consists of Apprentice, Ordinary, Able and Quartermaster. The first rank of Apprentice shows basic marlinspike seamanship skills, safety and basic ideals. To earn Ordinary, the Sea Scout must know the Ideals of Sea Scouts, be an active member for six months, learn specials skills relating to boats, marlinspike seamanship, piloting, communicating, swimming, safety, and cooking. In addition electives. For the Able rank, the Sea Scout must be able to explain and demonstrate a complete knowledge seamanship skills, earn the Lifesaving merit badge, complete a long cruise, and must be an officer in his or her ship. Sea Scouts who earn the rank of Able can enlist in the U.S. Coast Guard at the pay grade of E-2.

Quartermaster is the highest rank attainable by a Sea Scout and is equivalent to Eagle Scout (Boy Scouts of America). The Sea Scout must attend at least three-quarters of all Ship meetings and special activities over eighteen months, demonstrate marlinspike seamanship and leadership skills, demonstrate the ability to teach Sea Scouts skills, complete a Quartermaster Leadership Service Project (community service project) and pass a council level board of review. The Quartermaster emblem is a medal consisting of the Sea Scout emblem on a ship's wheel that is suspended from a solid dark blue ribbon that is in turn suspended from a bar bearing the design of a double carrick bend knot. In 2011, 40 Sea Scouts attained the rank of Quartermaster, compared with over 51000 Eagle Scouts.

Sea Scouts who earn this rank are entitled to wear a uniform similar to that of a United States Navy Chief Petty Officer (CPO), and can enlist in the U.S. Navy or United States Coast Guard at the pay grade of E-3.

== Other awards and recognitions ==
Sea Scout qualifications

Small Boat Handler, Qualified Seaman
Long Cruise Badge

Sea Scouts currently may earn two seamanship knowledge and skill qualification recognitions: the "Qualified Seaman" and "Small Boat Handler" badges.

The Sea Scout Leadership Award is presented at the Council, Area, Region, and National levels to those who provide notable service beyond the unit.

The Long Cruise Badge may be earned by Ordinary rank and above Sea Scouts and adults who complete a two-week cruise, or a series of weekend or overnight cruises adding up to 14 days. Segments indicate subsequent awards – red for one additional award and white for five additional awards.

From June 1998 to February 2016 Sea Scouts was part of the Venturing program and Sea Scouts could earn Venturing awards. Sea Scouts who have earned the First Class rank in Scouts BSA can work on requirements and merit badges for the rank of Eagle Scout until age 18.

== Activities ==
As a high adventure maritime program, most ships engage in several on the water activities, such as sailing trips, scuba dives, paddling, power boating, and other activities. Ships also have to work on maintaining their boats and equipment.

Councils may hold Sea Scout regattas or rendezvous organized among local ships, usually with sailing competitions that may include ships from other councils. Several areas and regions also organize similar events. Every summer several Sea Scouts sail aboard the USCGC Eagle. Sea Scouts also have the opportunity to qualify for the biennuel William I. Koch International Sea Scout Cup, an international Sea Scout event.

The Ancient Mariner Regatta (AMR) began in 1952. The location of AMR was the Coast Guard Island in Alameda California, until the tragic events of September 11, 2001. After 9/11, the heightened level of security at the Coast Guard base prohibited the regatta from happening. As a result, the regatta was temporarily rehomed to the Sea Scout Base in Stockton, and then found a home on the aircraft carrier USS Hornet for several years. The regatta now takes place at the California Maritime Academy (CMA) campus.

AMR takes place over the course of Memorial Day Weekend each year. Various ships from across the western region gather to partake in a friendly competition, including ships from SoCal, NorCal, Hawaii, and sometimes even Idaho and Arizona. The regatta is intended to enhance one's maritime skills, including marlinspike, charting, sailing, safety, and many others. In addition to advancing, the regatta also contributes to socialization and fellowship with events like a movie or a dance at the end of each day.

Other similar regattas exist, such as the Old Salts Regatta and the Southwestern Rendezvous. The latter takes place over Thanksgiving Weekend, and was once located at Camp Pendleton, California. In 2018, the regatta was relocated to the Cabrillo facility and has since been dubbed "Cabrillo Rendezvous" rather than Southwestern Rendezvous.

== Training ==
Sea Scouts take specific Sea Scout training for youth and adults.

=== Youth Training ===
There are several training opportunities available to Sea Scout youth including Quarterdeck Training, and Introduction to Leadership Skills for Ships (ILSS), and National Youth Leadership Development Training (NYLT).

Sea Scouts may also obtain the boating licenses and safe boating training certifications offered at the state and local levels and are encouraged to qualify in first aid, CPR, lifesaving, SCUBA and US Sailing certifications. Ships are encouraged to affiliate with the United States Coast Guard Auxiliary and the United States Power Squadrons enabling Sea Scouts and Scouters to obtain additional training.

=== Adult Training ===
A trained Sea Scout Leader has completed Sea Scout Adult Leader Basic Training. Supplemental training includes Long Cruse Planning, Introduction to on the Water Leadership Skills, and Advanced on the Water Leadership Skills. Seabadge is an advanced leadership unit management training targeted to Sea Scout leaders.

== See also ==
- S.S.S. Lotus
- United States Coast Guard Auxiliary
- United States Power Squadrons
