= National Youth Leadership Training Leadership Academy =

Training program of the BSA

- Owner: Boy Scouts of America
- Country: United States
- Founded: 2005
- Website www.nylt-leadershipacademy.org

The National Youth Leadership Training Leadership Academy (NYLT Leadership Academy or The Academy) is a program of the National Council of the Boy Scouts of America that trains youth staff members for council level National Youth Leadership Training (NYLT) courses. The course, formerly named the Northeast Region Youth Staff Development Course (YSDC) while located in New Jersey, has moved to its new home in Haymarket, Virginia, just outside Washington, D.C. at the National Capitol Area Council Camp William B. Snyder. The course is currently offered two times each summer. The course is only available to those who staff or will staff a National Youth Leadership Training course in their home council.

NYLT Leadership Academy is the new name for the Youth Staff Development Course (YSDC) previously held in New Jersey at Yards Creek Scout Reservation and replaces the National Junior Leader Instructor Camp (NJLIC) that was held at Philmont Scout Ranch.

== Pilot course ==
The Northeast Region Youth Staff Development Course began as a pilot program of the Boy Scouts of America Northeast Region. It trains youth staff members for council level NYLT courses. This training program is one of several programs available within the youth leadership training program. The program has now graduated out of the pilot phase and is now a fully national program. In the process, the name of the course was updated to the current NYLT Leadership Academy.

== History ==
National Junior Leader Instructor Camp (NJLIC) was a national level course at Philmont Scout Ranch that trained youth leader staff who would then provide leadership for Junior Leader Training courses at the council level. In 2006, NJLIC was discontinued. YSDC, as a pilot program, was created by the Northeast Region. The first program was held at Yard's Creek Scout Reservation in Blairstown, New Jersey in 2006.

The original course designed to train staff for council leadership camps, National Junior Leader Instructor Training Course (NJLITC) was held at Mortimer L. Schiff Scout Reservation in Mendham, New Jersey and at Philmont Scout Ranch in Cimarron, New Mexico. The Schiff program began in 1952 and was discontinued in 1974. That this new program brings BSA youth leadership training full circle—this is symbolically represented in the program's emblem. Advanced leadership training has traditionally been recognized by a red and blue shield. The shield is divided into a blue upper and a red lower region, as were the Schiff and Philmont NJLITC emblems. At the center of the shield are the points of a compass, representing NYLT, and within the compass is a fleur-de-lis, the universal symbol of scouting. In the center of the fleur-de-lis is a red tent on a green tulip tree leaf, the symbol of Schiff Scout Reservation. This program is a culmination of all previous Scout youth train-the-trainer programs.

The current courses are held in campgrounds around 3 major US cities, Washington D.C., St. Louis, and Los Angeles, in the summertime.

== Course philosophy ==
NYLT Leadership Academy embodies Baden-Powell's "Scouting is a game with a purpose" philosophy. The overarching purpose of Leadership Academy is to develop quality youth staff for council NYLT courses by creating an environment that fosters learning and growth. It is a general maxim in the Scouting movement that Scouting provides a "special place;" meaning that Scouts, by following the Scout oath and law, create an environment that is open, accepting, and positive. At its inception the Youth Staff Development Course wholly embraced and broadened this concept to include elements of servant leadership, and equality of participants and staff at camp. This concept of "special place" allows the participating staff to take risks in a safe environment, and to be able to learn from their mistakes.

The preferred term for participants is participating staff, as all people at NYLT Leadership Academy are staff, if not at NYLT Leadership Academy then at their council NYLT. NYLT Leadership Academy is egalitarian; any dichotomy of staff and participants is discouraged in the atmosphere and culture of the course. Out of this environment of equal footing for all, the concept of servant leadership naturally emerges. At Leadership Academy, participating staff members are encouraged to be both leaders and servants. NYLT Leadership Academy's intent is to make Robert K. Greenleaf’s statement, “A great leader is seen as servant first, and that simply is the key to his greatness.” come to life.

== Course content ==
The Academy's purpose is to train youth to run the best possible NYLT courses in their local councils. This is accomplished by teaching both presentation skills, team development, and servant leadership. By enhancing the presentation skills of the participating staff, they are better enabled to teach both NYLT content and other skills at their home courses. When the concept of Tuckman's stages of team development is taught, youth are able to recognize both their own development, and the development of those around them. The participating staff are then able to adapt their teaching styles to match the stage of development that their team is in. By teaching the concept of servant leadership, youth can lead others while serving them too.
