= National Flagship =

Sea Scouting
- Owner: Scouting America
- Website seascout.org

The Sea Scouts BSA National Flagship recognition was created in conjunction with the Boat Owners Association of the United States. The National Flagship is presented in recognition of excellence in program quality, youth achievement, and adult commitment.

The National Flagship is recognized with a National Flagship trophy, a National Flagship flag emblazoned with four national stars, and the designated shoulder patch for members of the Ship (unit). The National Flagship is accompanied by the National Flagship Fleet which recognizes runners-up for the award.

== National Flagships ==
- 2026 - Viking, Ship 100, San Francisco, California
- 2025 - Pearls, Ship 669, Santa Cruz, California
- 2024 - Invincible, Ship 502, Houston, Texas
- 2023 - Viking, Ship 100, San Francisco, California
- 2022 - Ranger, Ship 8009, Belleville, Illinois
- 2021 - Seafarers Commitment, Ship 1959, Annapolis, Maryland
- 2020 - Ship 198, Lewes, Delaware
- 2019 – Confluence, Ship 16, Hampton, Virginia
- 2018 – Unique, Ship 1, Palestine, Texas
- 2017 – Dominion, Ship 100, Manassas, Virginia
- 2016 – Viking, Ship 100, San Francisco, California
- 2015 – Enterprise, Ship 1000, Rockwall, Texas
- 2014 – Dragonlady, Ship 1942, Arlington, Virginia
- 2013 – Makai, Ship 700, San Leandro, California
- 2012 – Albatross, Ship 72, Martinez, California
- 2011 – Tsunami, Portland, Oregon
- 2010 – Minnow, Houston, Texas
- 2009 – Renegade, Newport Beach, California
- 2008 – Indomitable, Bay Village, Ohio
- 2007 – Dragonlady, Arlington, Virginia
- 2006 – DelMar, Newport Beach, California
- 2005 – Arcturus, Westover, West Virginia
- 2004 – Jolly Roger, Houston, Texas
- 2003 – Gryphon, Redwood, City, California
- 2002 – Invincible, Houston, Texas
- 1946 - Polaris, Saint Louis, Missouri
- 1945 - Alamitos, Long Beach, California
- 1944 - Unknown
- 1943 - Chadwick, Enid, Oklahoma
- 1942 - Flying Dutchman, Chicago, Illinois
- 1941 - Sea Lion, St. Louis, Illinois
- 1940 - Marblehead, Salem, Massachusetts
- 1939 - Davy Jones, Greensboro, North Carolina
- 1938 - Sea Hawk, Berkeley, California
- 1937 - Polaris, St. Louis, Missouri
- 1936 - Columbia, Portland, Oregon
- 1935 - Tarpon, Great Neck, Long Island, New York
- 1934 - Ranger, Portland, Oregon
- 1933 - Kansan, Topeka, Kansas
- 1932 - Frederick Harris, Springfield, Massachusetts
- 1931 - Kansan, Topeka, Kansas
- 1930 - Leif Erikson, Birmingham, Alabama
- 1929 - Old Ironsides, Chicago, Illinois

== National Flagship Fleet ==
2026 National Flagship Fleet

- Corsair, Ship 2, San Francisco, California
- Dragon Lady, Ship 1942, Arlington, Virginia
- Polaris, Ship 2028, Villa Park, Illinois
- Rising Phoenix, Ship 1908, Union City, New Jersey
- Valhalla, Ship 185, Apollo Beach, Florida

2025 National Flagship Fleet

- Alamo, Ship 26, San Antonio, Texas
- Salvagers, Ship 1926, Montgomery, Illinois
- Spear, Ship 25, Ithaca, New York
- Valkyrie, Ship 9024, Muskegon, Michigan

2024 National Flagship Fleet

- Alamo, Ship 26, San Antonio, Texas
- Déjà Vu, Ship 202, Portland, Oregon
- Invincible, Ship 502, Houston, Texas
- Rising Phoenix, Ship 1908, Union City, New Jersey
- Valkyrie, Ship 9024, Muskegon, Michigan

2023 National Flagship Fleet

- Maolo, Ship 550, Long Beach, California
- Rising Phoenix, Ship 1908, Union City, New Jersey
- Sea Fox, Ship 9, Alameda, California
- Valkyrie, Ship 9024, Muskegon, Michigan

2022 National Flagship Fleet

- Aeolus, Ship 1889, Capitol Area Council, Texas
- Corsair, Ship 22, San Francisco, California
- Dragonlady, Ship 1942, Arlington, Virginia

2021 National Flagship Fleet

- Ship 100, Canton, Georgia
- Centennial, Ship 444, Littleton, Colorado
- Heatwave, Ship 450, Lake Havasu City, Arizona

2020 National Flagship Fleet

- Enterprise, Ship 1701, Bellaire, Texas
- Heatwave, Ship 450, Lake Havasu City, Arizona
- Response, Ship 911, Round Rock, Texas

2019 National Flagship Fleet

- Dragonlady, Ship 1942, Arlington, Virginia
- Enterprise, Ship 1701, Bellaire, Texas
- Response, Ship 911, Round Rock, Texas

2018 National Flagship Fleet

- Captain Awesome, Ship 1015, Prairielands Council, Illinois
- Charles N. Curtis, Ship 110, Tacoma, Washington
- Decisive, Ship 5011, Kapaa, Hawaii
- Del Mar, Ship 711, Newport Beach, California
- Dragonlady, Ship 1942, Arlington, Virginia
- Nahar, Ship 626, Mansfield, Texas
- Response, Ship 911, Round Rock, Texas

2017 National Flagship Fleet

- Charles N. Curtis, Ship 110, Tacoma, Washington
- Decisive, Ship 5011, Kapaa, Hawaii
- Dragonlady, Ship 1942, Arlington, Virginia
- Response, Ship 911, Round Rock, Texas

2016 National Flagship Fleet

- Columbia Ranger, Ship 361, Columbia, Maryland
- Cricket, Ship 876, Liverpool, New York
- Decisive, Ship 11, Kapaa, Hawaii
- Dragonlady, Ship 1942, Arlington, Virginia
- Heatwave, Ship 450, Lake Havasu City, Arizona
- Response, Ship 911, Round Rock, Texas
- Sea Fox, Ship 9, Alameda, California

2015 National Flagship Fleet

- Dragonlady, Ship 1942, Arlington, Virginia
- Response, Ship 911, Round Rock, Texas
- Runners, Ship 212, Stafford, Virginia

2014 National Flagship Fleet

- City of Roses, Ship 601, Portland, Oregon
- The Dawn Treader, Ship 378, West Point Lake, Georgia
- Heatwave, Ship 450, Lake Havasu City, Arizona
- Tsunami, Ship 678, Battleground, Washington
