= Fire Service Exploring =

Program of the Boy Scouts of America

- Owner: Learning for Life
- Country: United States
- Website; Fire Service Exploring

Fire Service Exploring (sometimes referred to as just Fire Exploring or Exploring, while its participants are called "Explorers") is one of the career-oriented programs offered by Learning for Life, a branch of the Boy Scouts of America.

== Description ==
Fire Service Exploring is a program offered by Learning for Life that introduces major aspects of the fire service to young adults ages 14–21, or in the ninth grade. Once enough training has been acquired, Explorers can be allowed on actual fire-related emergency calls under certain conditions such as:

- Explorers cannot enter a structure unless deemed stable and secure.
- Explorers may only enter a structure fire after the initial attack, and search.
- Explorers are not to be used or substituted as trained personnel
- Explorers are not permitted to perform life saving tasks or rescues

Certain local, state, and federal laws as well as National BSA Regulations restrict the duties an Explorer can perform on a fire ground.

== Organization ==
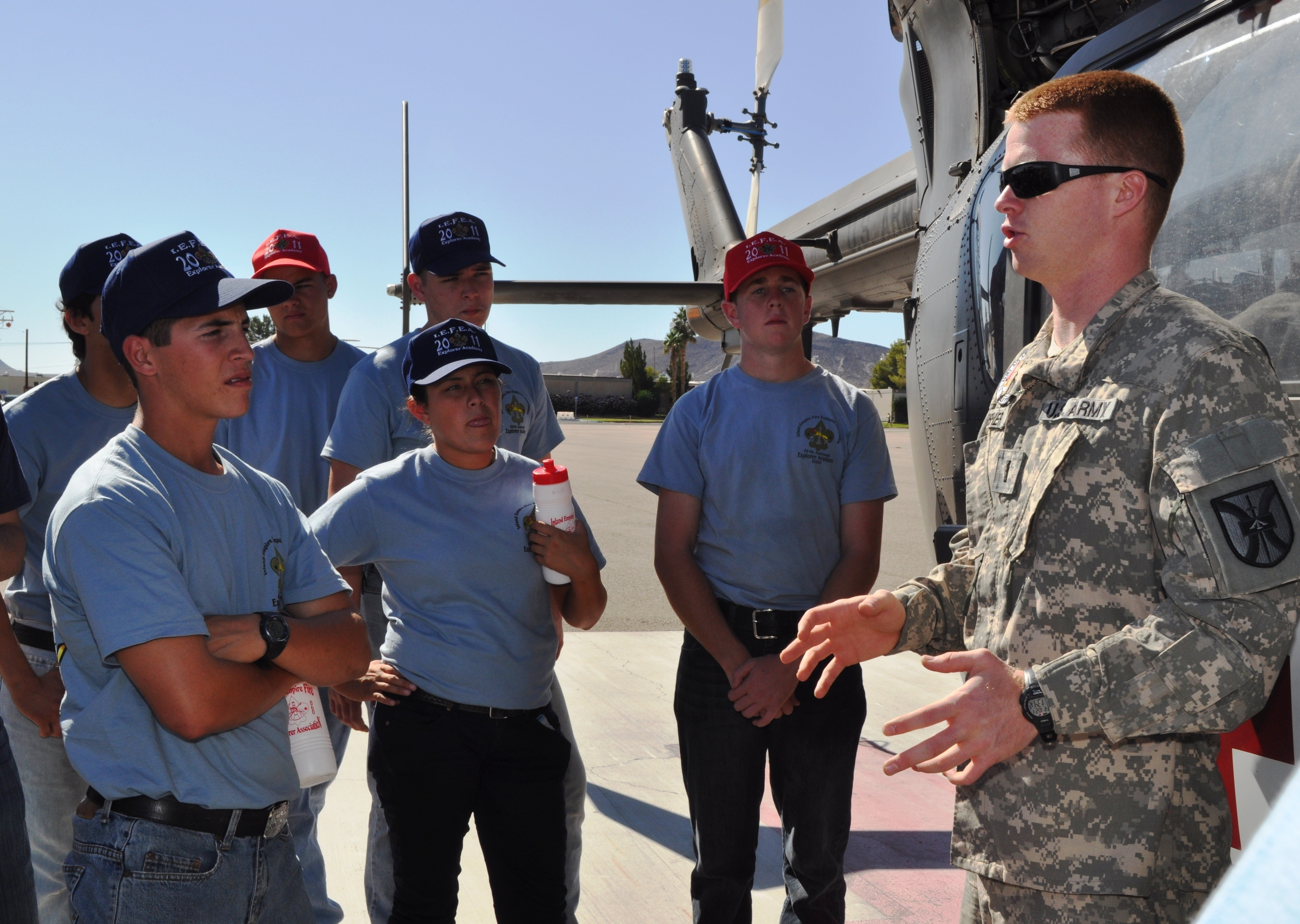
1st Lt. Davidson Fisher, C Company, 2916th Aviation Battalion, speaks to fire explorers about his company's work during the Inland Empire Fire Explorers Academy.

The program is divided into numbered local groups called "Posts" which are sponsored and organized by a fire department in the area. This fire department provides some funding, materials, gear, and a place to meet and train. A Post is typically run by the post officers, headed by an Explorer Captain, who is first Explorer in command and usually elected annually by the Post membership. In addition to the captain, there are one or more lieutenants who act as second and third in command. Besides the officers, other positions include secretary, engineer, treasurer and others. Also, a number of adult leaders, called "advisors", are required of every post. Advisors are above the captain in command and advise the officers and provide training and supervision for Post activities and events.

== Training and duties ==
The Fire Service Explorer Post does not train Explorers to a level of certification, but does offer correct methodology for tasks that the Explorer may encounter upon official entry into the fire service. There are strict guidelines and regulations that must be followed for the Explorer's safety as outlined by Learning For Life and the Boy Scouts of America.

Explorers may receive verbal lectures, practical skill assessments, scenario mitigation, and other methods of instruction. There are no regulations for instructors as many are members of the sponsoring fire department(s) sharing their knowledge on a less than standardized level.

== Medical training ==
Most Explorer Posts offer First Aid and CPR/AED training. Medical training is provided while following strict local, state, and federal requirements which may vary vastly depending on location.

Explorers may be permitted to respond with their sponsoring fire department, but under Learning For Life regulations, Explorers are prohibited from performing both as trained emergency personnel and as rescue personnel.

Explorers should remember that this program is for "exploring" the possibility of a future with a fire department and that they are not permitted by law to perform as firefighters or emergency medical personnel.

== Uniforms and insignia ==
Fire Service Explorers may be issued professional or casual style uniforms, but are required to identify the member as a Fire Service Explorer.

Official Uniform Name	Description of Typical Uniform	Occasion
Class A	Light blue/Black/Gray/Orange dress shirt, Dark blue dress pants, dress shoes	Public events such as parades, funerals, fairs, etc.
Class B	Light blue/Black/Gray/Orange T-shirt/Polo shirt (duty shirt), pants	Station/Duty Wear
Turnout (Bunker) Gear	Bunker coat, bunker pants, bunker boots, hood, gloves, and helmet.	Field Wear

Uniforms will almost always bear the insignia of Fire Exploring and/or the fire department they run out of. Class A uniforms can bear the American Flag shoulder badge, the official Fire Explorers badge, and sometimes the badge of the department they represent and various pins like name plates etc. The Class B uniform T-shirt will be a simple Explorers or fire department logo printed in the shirt. Turnout gear may or may not have much more than the name of the Explorer printed on the back on the jacket.

== Media depiction ==
- In the television series, Code Red, the child character, Danny Blake, is a Fire Explorer who is considerably younger than the actual allowed age group for the organization, who enjoys unusually privileged access to Fire Department activities due to his father being a Battalion Fire Chief.

== See also ==
- Explorer Search and Rescue
- Exploring
- Health Career Exploring
- Junior firefighter (typically outside of United States)
- Law Enforcement Exploring
