= Health Career Exploring =

- Owner: Learning for Life
- Country: United States
- Website; Health Career Exploring

Health Career Exploring, whose participants are called "Explorers," is one of the career-oriented programs offered by Learning for Life, a branch of the Boy Scouts of America.

== Description ==
Health Career Exploring is a program for high school students who want to learn more about specific health careers and observe the workplace of various healthcare professionals. Explorers may attend monthly meetings where they can study health-related topics.

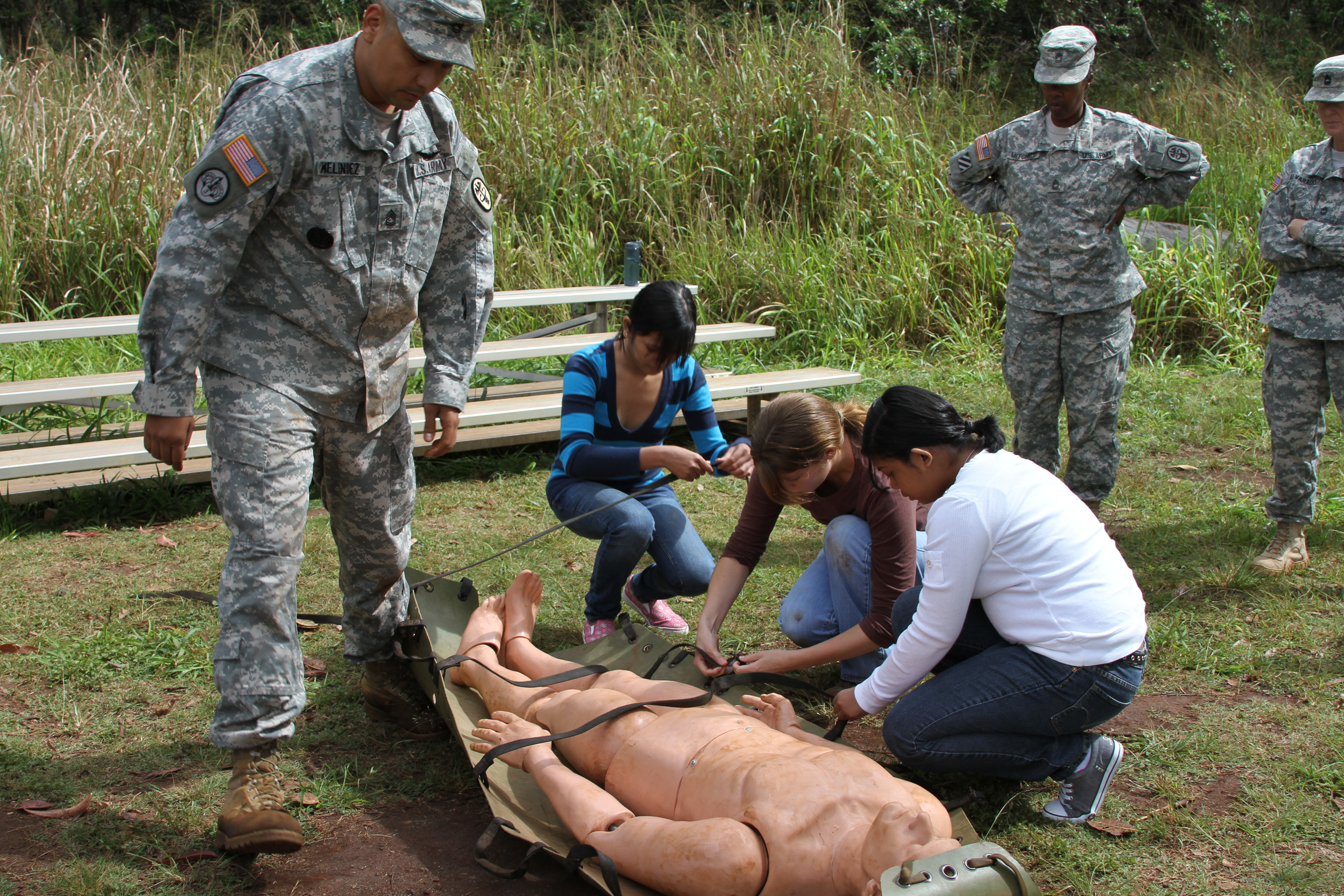
Soldiers from the Tripler Army Medical Center teaching explorers from Medical Explorers Post 1948.

Explorers may study medical careers including the following, but not limited to:

- Nurse
- Physician
- Pharmacist
- Veterinarian
- Physical Therapists
- Psychologists / Psychiatrists
- Sports medicine
- Dentistry
- Home Health Care Aide

== See also ==
- Aviation Career Exploring
- Fire Service Exploring
- Law Enforcement Exploring
