= Venturing =

Program of Scouting America for young adults ages 14 to 20

- Owner: Scouting America
- Age range: 13 through 20 years
- Country: United States
- Founded: February 9, 1998
- Membership: 20,174 youth (2025); 1,730 crews (2025)
- President: Shreemann Patel
Previous; Scouts BSA	Next; Sea Scouts
- Website; BSA Venturing
- Standard uniform colors for Venturing

Venturing is a core program of Scouting America for coeducational teenagers and young adults ages 14 (or 13 and graduated the eighth grade) through 20. It is one of Scouting America's three programs for older youth, the others being Sea Scouts and Exploring. The purpose of Venturing is to provide a positive environment where youth members, called Venturers, can experience adventure, leadership, personal growth, and service.

== History ==
While the Venturing program is relatively new, older youth Scouting has a long history within Scouting America. The program got its start in the 1930s as the "Senior Scout" Division for boys 15 and older.

In 1949 the Senior Scout Division became the Explorer Division. Sea Scouts became Sea Explorers, Air Scouts became Air Explorers, and Explorer Scouts simply Explorers. The Explorer program became less of an advanced outdoor program and more a broader program for young men, with the minimum age lowered to 14 years old. Explorers received a new advancement program, which lead to the Silver Award.

Explorer advancement was dropped in 1959. The Air Explorer program was dropped in 1964 and the Sea Explorer program had changes made, appealing more to older youth with career exploration becoming a bigger part of the program.

The BSA (known today as Scouting America) admitted young women ages 14–20 beginning in 1969. Many posts became co-ed. The focus on career exploration was increased, and, as the years progressed, Exploring focused more on career exploration posts, though outdoor and sports-oriented posts continued to thrive.

Career Awareness Explorer posts were introduced in the early 1980s. This was the fastest growing segment of Exploring and the BSA during the 1980s. These posts were realigned into the new Learning for Life subsidiary in 1991, and the posts were then designated as High School Career Awareness groups and the youth were no longer considered to be Explorers.

In 1998, the Venturing program took over the outdoor activities of the old BSA Explorer program, while career-oriented activities were transferred to the Learning for Life organization and renamed Exploring. In February 2016, Sea Scouting became a separate program division from Venturing.

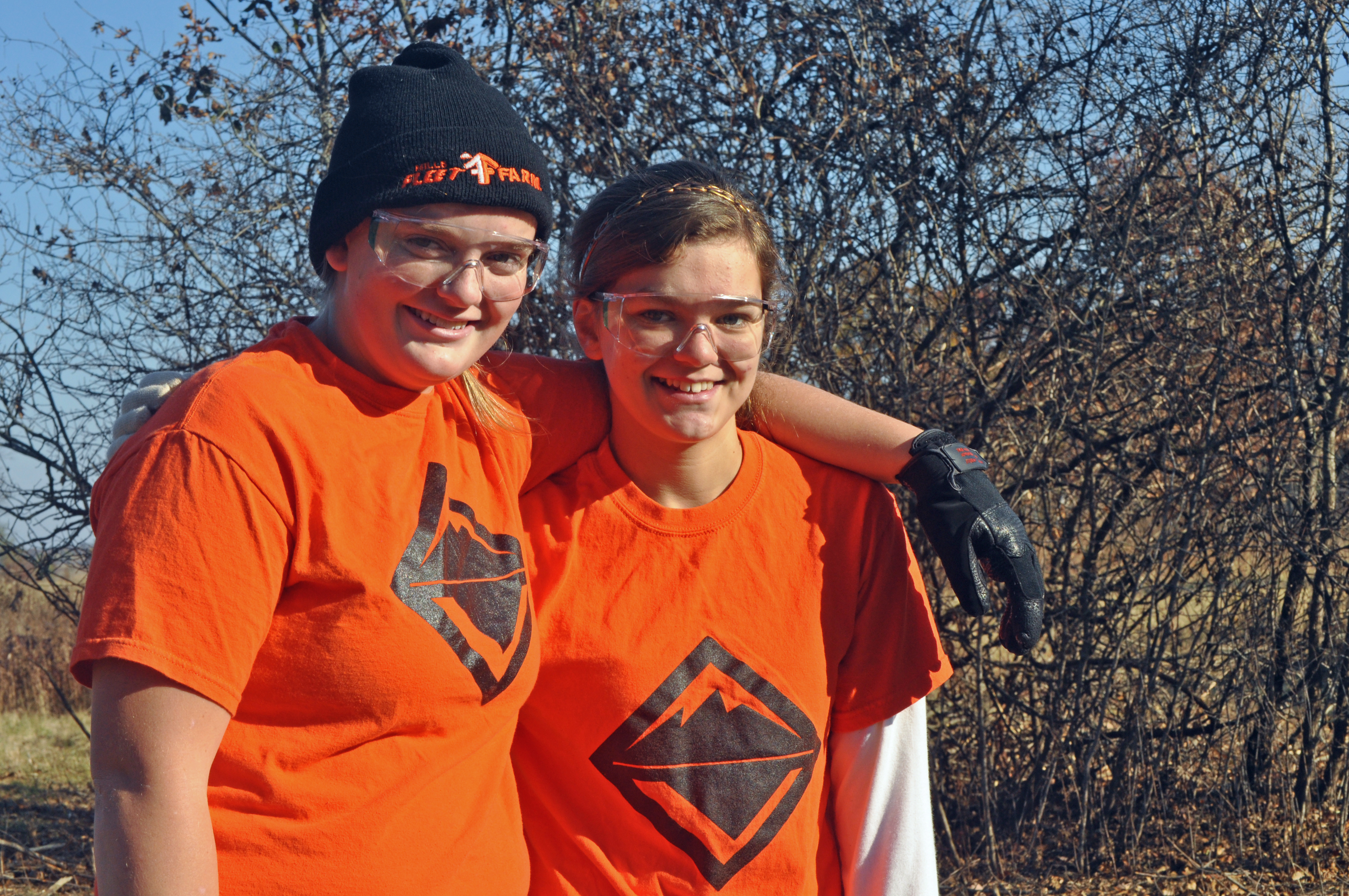
Venturers wearing informal (class B) uniforms

== Aims and principles ==
Venturers subscribe to the Scout Oath and Law, the Venturing Motto and the ALPS Model.

=== Venturing Motto ===
"Lead the Adventure"

=== ALPS Model ===
Adventure, Leadership, Personal Growth, Service

== Organization ==
=== Venturing crews ===
Each crew is sponsored by a community organization such as a business, service organization, school, labor group or religious institution, called the chartered organization. The chartered organization, represented by the adult Chartered Organization Representative, is responsible for providing a meeting place and promoting a good program. A chartered organization representative manages the relationship between the crew, the chartered organization, and Scouting America.

Additionally, Venturing crew's should have a crew committee. The crew committee is a group of adults, led by the Crew Committee Chair, who guide the crew program and activities and manage record keeping, finance, leadership recruitment, and registration. The crew committee may elect to have the crew be all-male, all-female, or co-ed.

The crew itself is led by youth members who are elected to different leadership positions. Traditionally, these include president, vice president of administration, vice president of program, secretary, treasurer, quartermaster, guide, and historian. However, crews are free to add or remove positions as it benefits their crew. Additionally, crews may choose to have ad hoc or temporary positions like activity chair. The crew officers are encouraged to select a specialty for their crew, plan program for the upcoming year, train their crew's members, recruit new Venturers, and give service to their communities.

The role of the Crew Advisor is to help guide and mentor youth crew officers and members as they lead their crew. Depending on the size of the crew, the Crew Advisor may choose to recruit Crew Associate Advisors.

=== Venturing Officers' Association ===
Supporting Venturing Crews, Venturing is supported by Council, Territory, and National Venturing Officers' Associations (VOAs). The purpose of the VOA is to better the Venturing program for Venturing youth and adults across the country. They strive to host Venturing program, teach Venturing trainings, provide crews with important resources, and grow Venturing membership.

The National Venturing Officers’ Association (National VOA or NVOA), previously known as the National Venturing Cabinet, is composed of the National Venturing President and five National Venturing Vice Presidents, each responsible for Administration, Program, Communication, and Territory Support for the Eastern and Western Council Service Territories. These youth leaders work closely with a team of adult advisors, including the National Venturing Advisor, Associate Advisors, and the National Professional Director, to support and represent Venturers nationwide.

The National Venturing Cabinet includes all members of the National VOA as well as the 14 Territory VOA Presidents from across the country. This expanded body serves as the national advisory group for Venturing and reports to the National Venturing Committee.

In 2024, NSTs were renamed to Council Service Territories (CSTs) and several CST boundaries were updated. The Venturing model refers to them as "Council Support Territories" to emphasize the supporting role of Territory Venturing Officers' Associations. Additionally, two territories were merged into adjacent ones, resulting in a total of 14 Council Service Territories.

== Scouts BSA Awards, Venturing Advancement, and Venturing Awards ==
=== Scouts BSA Awards ===
Any Venturer who has achieved the First Class rank as a Scout in a troop (or did so as a Varsity Scout in a team) may continue advancement toward Star, Life and Eagle Scout ranks, and Eagle Palms, up to his or her 18th birthday. Venturers must meet the requirements as prescribed in the official Scouts BSA Handbooks and on Scouting.org. As the Venturer meets requirements for the Star and Life ranks, a Board of Review is to be conducted by the crew committee. The Eagle Board of Review follows the procedures for advancement established by the local council.

There are more than 135 merit badges any Venturer under 18 years old may earn any of these at any time. Venturers 18 years and over may register to become a Merit Badge Counselor with their local council.

=== Rank advancement ===
The core Venturing program includes advancement opportunities for youth featuring four different ranks: Venturing, Discovery, Pathfinder, and Summit. These ranks must be earned in order. The Venturing Summit Rank is comparable to the rank of Eagle Scout.

- Venturing Rank – The Venturer makes a commitment to join the crew and move forward into the experience of Venturing.
- Discovery Rank – The Venturer must participate in adventures, take CPR and first aid training, complete the Introduction to Leadership Skills for Crews and the Goal-Setting and Time Management, and Crew Officers' Orientation. They must also set and achieve a personal goal and participate in service activities.
- Pathfinder Rank – The Venturer must participate in and lead adventures, take the Project Management training, and give leadership to advanced adventures. They must also serve as a leader in the crew, serve on a VOA, or serve on staff for leadership training. Additionally, they must set and achieve another personal goals, lead a crew recruitment project, and participate in service activities.
- Summit Rank – The Venturer must participate in and lead adventures, complete the Mentoring training, mentor another youth in leading an activity, serve as a leader in the crew, serve on a VOA, or serve on staff for a leadership training. They must also complete a personal reflection, create a personal code of conduct, lead an ethical controversy and conflict resolution scenario, and plan and conduct a service project similar to that required for the rank of Eagle Scout.

=== Specialty awards ===
In addition to Venturing's core ranks, Venturers may also earn awards that demonstrate their unique skill sets.

- Ranger Award – The Ranger Award recognizes youth for high-level outdoors and high-adventure skills like first aid, conservation, and various electives.
- Quest Award – The Quest Award recognizes youth who take control of their personal health by managing their diet and exercise.
- TRUST Award – The TRUST Award recognizes youth who learn to trust those around them by more closely connecting themselves with their religion, culture, community, and themself.
- Supernova Award – The Supernova award recognizes youth who work alongside an adult mentor to better understand the world of STEM and take on unique STEM-related projects.
- Shooting Sports Outstanding Achievement Award – This award recognizes youth who take their shooting skills to the next level by becoming proficient in five of the seven shooting sports sections: air pistol, air rifle, archery, muzzle-loading rifle, shotgun, pistol, or small bore rifle.
- World Conservation Award – The World Conservation Award provides an opportunity for individual Venturers to “think globally” and “act locally” to preserve and improve our environment. Requirements are tailored to be age appropriate to individual Scouting America Programs.

=== Venturing Leadership Award ===
The Venturing Leadership Award is given to recognize both Venturing adults and youth who have made exceptional contributions to Venturing and who exemplify the Scout Oath and Law. The Venturing leadership can be given out by councils, territories and the National Council. Territories may only give out six and the National Council may only give out 12 Venturing Leadership Awards every year. Councils do not have a limit on the number they may present. The award was not presented to adults from 2012 – 2015.

=== National Noteworthy Crew Award ===
The National Noteworthy Crew award is a distinction presented by the National Venturing Officers' Association every year to 3–5 Venturing crews from across the country who approach Venturing in innovative ways. The award was modeled off of Sea Scouting's National Flagship. The award was first presented in May 2021.

== Training ==
=== Youth training ===
As part of its rank advancement, Venturing offers youth members the opportunity to complete the following trainings:

- Personal Safety Awareness Training (Venturing Rank)
- Introduction to Leadership Skills for Crews (Discovery Rank)
- Goal Setting and Time Management (Discovery Rank)
- Crew Officers' Orientation (Discovery Rank)
- Project Management Training (Pathfinder Rank)
- Mentoring Training (Summit Rank)

Additionally, Venturers may also choose to take the following trainings:

- National Youth Leadership Training (NYLT) offered by a local council.
- National Youth Leadership Training Leadership Academy (NYLT Leadership Academy or The Academy) is a program that trains youth staff members for council level NYLT courses offering locations vary by year.
- National Advanced Youth Leadership Experience (NAYLE) offered at the Philmont Training Center or The Summit Bechtel Reserve.
- Wood Badge offered by a local council if the Venturer is 18 or older.

Upon turning 18, all youth Venturing participants are required to take Scouting America's Youth Protection Training (YPT).

=== Adult training ===
To help prepare adults to guide youth through their Venturing experience, Venturing offers adults access to the following Venturing-specific trainings:

- Venturing Advisor Position-Specific Training available online.
- Crew Committee Position-Specific Training available online.
- Wood Badge offered by a local council.

Additionally, all adult Venturing volunteers are required to take the Scouting America's Youth Protection Training Youth Protection Training (YPT). Re-certification is required every two years.

== Retired, Outdated, or Discontinued ==
=== Aims and Principles ===
Prior to 2014, Venturers also had their own Venturing Oath and Code.

=== Awards ===
- Before the current Venturing advancement was created, the Gold Award and the Silver Award were the highest Venturing recognition that could be obtained. They were both discontinued on December 31, 2014.
- Before the current Venturing specialty awards, the Venturing Bronze awards for Arts and Hobbies, Outdoor, Sea Scouts, Sports and Religious Life were the primary specialty awards Venturers could earn. They were discontinued on December 31, 2014.

=== Organization ===
Prior to the BSA's national restructure in 2021, there were Council, Area, Regional, and National VOAs. The nation was divided into four regions: Central, Northeast, Southern, and Western. Combined, there were 27 areas – seven in the Central Region, six in the Northeast Region, nine in the Southern Region, and five in the Western Region.

Post restructuring the country was divided into 16 national service territories (NSTs), each with its own VOA.

=== Trainings ===
- Kodiak offered by a local council. Kodiak was a Venturing-specific training that was discontinued in 2024.
- Powder Horn offered by a local council. Powder Horn was a Venturing-specific training that was retired in 2024.

=== VenturingFest ===
VenturingFest is a gathering for hundreds of Venturers from across the country to intermingle at The Summit Bechtel Reserve in Mount Hope, West Virginia. During their week-long VenturingFest experience, Venturers had the opportunity to rock climb, skateboard, BMX bike, participate in a variety of water sports, use the facilities shooting ranges, zip line, and attend concerts. VenturingFest has been hosted twice, once in 2016 and once in 2018. The third VenturingFest was planned for the summer of 2020, but was cancelled due to the COVID-19 pandemic.
