= Airport and airline management =

Aviation industry administration as a business studies field

Airline and airport management is the administration of airports and airlines. It includes the activities of setting the strategy of airports to gather and provide information on airline commercial and operational priorities. It covers a broad overview of the airline management. It is also studied as a branch of study that teaches management of airport and airlines. Those in charge of a certain airline at an airport are typically called station managers. This provides a broad overview of the airline industry and creates awareness of the underlying marketing, financial, operational, and other factors influencing airline management. This study provides information on airline commercial and operational priorities, along with teaching the key characteristics of aircraft selection and the impact of airport decision-making.
