= Exploring (Learning for Life) =

Program of the Boy Scouts of America

- Owner: Learning for Life
- Headquarters: Irving, Texas
- Country: United States
- Founded: 1949
- Membership: 37,678 youth (2025)
- National Director: Tim Anderson
- Website www.exploring.org

Exploring is an interactive, worksite-based career education program of Learning for Life, an affiliate of Scouting America. Participants in the program are called Explorers. The program serves youth in 6th-8th grades (Exploring clubs), and coeducational teenagers and young adults who are 14 through 20 years old (Exploring posts). Exploring units (clubs or posts), are sponsored by local businesses, government agencies, and nonprofit organizations, and usually focus on a single career field, but can also introduce youth to a variety of career fields within a single unit.

Prior to 1998, the Exploring program was the main BSA program for older youth and participants were called Explorer Scouts. The program included both career-focused posts, and posts with an emphasis on outdoor activities. The outdoor posts became the BSA's Venturing program.

== History ==
The Exploring program has a long history within the BSA. The program got its start in the 1930s as the "Senior Scout" program for boys 15 and older. The Senior Scout program included the Sea Scouts, Air Scouts, Explorer Scouts, Rover Scouts and a few others. Explorer Scouts focused on advanced camping and worked on advancement leading to the Ranger Award. Sea Scouts and Air Scouts were nautical and aviation focused programs, respectively.

In 1949, the Senior Scout program became the Explorer Program. Sea Scouts became Sea Explorers, Air Scouts became Air Explorers, and Explorer Scouts became just Explorers. The Explorer program became less of an advanced outdoor program, and more a broader program for older youth. They got a new advancement program leading to the Silver Award. Also, the minimum age was lowered to 14.

In 1959, the Explorer Program became the Exploring program. Explorer advancement was dropped. In 1964, the Air Explorer program was eliminated, and the Sea Explorer program had changes made. The program was further changed to be more appealing to older youth, with career exploration becoming a bigger part of the program.

In 1969/71, the BSA allowed Girl Scouts of the USA and Camp Fire Girls to join Exploring, then made the Explorer program fully co-ed, and raised the upper age to 21. After this time, Exploring started to focus more and more on career exploration, though outdoor oriented Posts still existed.

In 1998, the Exploring program was split. All the career-oriented posts were moved to Learning for Life, Sea Explorers reverted to a standalone Sea Scout program, while the rest became the new Venturing program. Exploring is now a worksite-based career education program for young men and women 14 through 20 years old.

== Current programs ==
There are many different programs with Exploring.

- Arts and Humanities Career Exploring Field
- Aviation Field / General Interest / Career Exploring
- Business / Small or Large Exploring Field
- Communications Career Field Exploring
- Engineering & Technology Career Field
- Fire & Emergency Service Exploring Field
- Healthcare Career Field
- Law, Government, & Public Service Field
- Law Enforcement Exploring
- Science Career Exploring Fields
- Skilled Trades Career Exploring Field
- Social Services Career Exploring
- Hobbies Exploring
