= Learning for Life =

American youth program

- Owner: Learning for Life
- Headquarters: Irving, Texas
- Country: United States
- Founded: 1991
- Membership: 52,180 youth (2023)
- Website; Learning for Life

Learning for Life (LFL) corporation's mission is to develop and deliver engaging, research based academic, character, leadership and career focused programs aligned to state and national standards that guide and enable all students to achieve their full potential. LFL provides United States school and work-site based youth programs and is an affiliate of Scouting America. It utilizes programs designed for schools and community-based organizations that are designed to prepare youth for the complexities of contemporary society and to enhance their self-confidence, motivation, and self-esteem, and for careers.

Learning for Life is not considered a traditional scouting program; it does not use the Scout Promise, Scout Law, uniforms or insignia of traditional Scouting. All Learning for Life programs are open to youth and adults without restriction based on gender, residence, religion, sexual orientation, or other considerations, other than minimum age requirements. Exploring posts require background checks for adults over 18 years old as a condition of membership.

== Programs ==
=== School based programs ===
Learning for Life is a series of school-based programs for use by schools and educational organizations in the areas of character education, life skills, building self-esteem, and developing ethical decision-making skills.

The participant program categories, each with its own Learning for Life curriculum developed by the national office, consists of programs covering pre-kindergarten through Grade 12:

- Pre-K
- Kindergarten
- First grade
- Second grade
- Third grade
- Fourth grade
- Fifth grade
- Sixth grade
- Seventh grade
- Eighth grade
- High school - Personal Compass
- High school - Roadmap for the Future
- High school - Leadership Development

Curriculum used for these programs is based on lesson plans developed over the years by teachers and school volunteers. It was originally modeled on lesson plans adapted from Scouting meeting plans, but has been revised substantially so that it currently has little resemblance to Scout meetings.

Learning for Life programs emphasize the need to reinforce self-esteem and recognize student achievement and participation through recognition programs. Most of the Learning for Life programs include the use of wall charts, recognition stickers, iron-on emblems, and certificates produced by the national Learning for Life office.

There are also recognitions for schools, principals, teachers, and volunteers who successfully implement the programs. Local councils may recognize outstanding adults with the Golden Apple Award.

=== Exploring ===
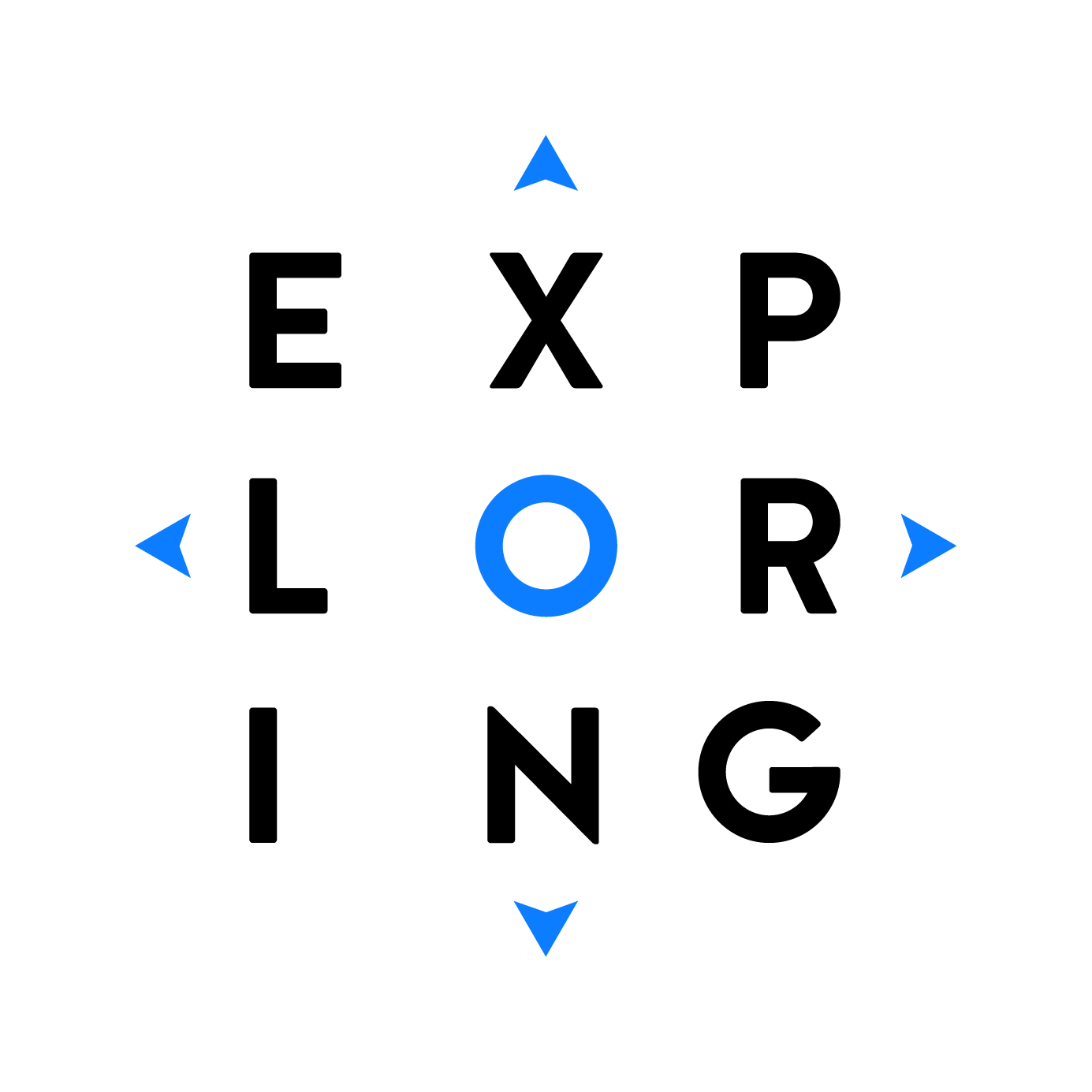
Exploring logo

Exploring is the worksite-based program of Learning for Life, and focuses on involving teenagers in clubs, called posts, that allow young people to learn about possible careers, form friendships, develop leadership skills, and enjoy activities with like-minded teens and adults. Exploring clubs are open to young men and women who are at least 10 years old or in grades 6-8 but not yet 15 years old. Exploring posts are open to young men and women who are 15 to 20 years old. Teens who are 14 and have graduated from eighth grade are also eligible to join an Exploring post. All Explorers are under the supervision of adults who serve as Post Advisors of Club Sponsors. The Explorers elect their own peer leaders to serve as officers, subject to the approval of the adult advisors and sponsors.

Exploring's purpose is to provide experiences that help young people mature and to prepare them to become responsible and caring adults. The result is a program of activities that helps youth pursue their special interests, grow, and develop.

Typical Exploring programs include groups of teenagers specializing in a field such as law enforcement, fire and emergency service, health careers, engineering, aviation, skilled trades, and technology. Exploring posts or clubs do not wear an official uniform. Any uniform worn is related to the type of career on which the post or club is focused. For example, youth in law enforcement Exploring posts and clubs wear a modified law enforcement uniform, similar to the uniform a police officer would wear. Many posts and clubs do not wear a specific uniform if the career field does not have a standard uniform.

Some Exploring posts gather together for national Exploring conferences and regional activities, sometimes called academies or musters. The law Explorers had an annual National Explorer Mock Trial Competition for many years but the competition has not been held since 2010. Some BSA councils host activities at which local Exploring posts and clubs participate.

The National Learning for Life office administers college scholarships for eligible Explorers, based on written applications. The office also creates a number of recognitions presented by local councils for Exploring adult volunteers and community organizations, the most prestigious of which is the William H. Spurgeon III Award. The Learning for Life office also promotes the Young American Award which recognizes outstanding young women and young men who excel in academics, sports and hobbies, community life, and civic service. These awards (which include a scholarship) are presented at the annual meeting of the BSA National Council.

== History ==
Exploring "Big E" logo

During the late 1970s and throughout the 1980s, over 40 BSA councils organized innovative, non-traditional programs called In-School Scouting. These units were in public schools (usually in low-income neighborhoods), where the schools invited the BSA and other partner organizations such as the Girl Scouts of the USA and Camp Fire USA to provide Scouting programs as part of the school curriculum, usually for an hour a week during a daytime elective period. There were some critics who complained that these programs were innovative to the point of not being "real Scouting," and there were occasionally difficulties in maintaining partnerships between these youth-serving agencies in delivering school programs to both boys and girls. This led the BSA to explore options regarding delivery of youth programs in public school settings, and a two-year effort including grass-roots task forces led to the development of Learning for Life, including its name.

The Learning for Life affiliate was launched in 1991 as a separate 501(c)(3) nonprofit organization from the BSA to continue serving youth through public schools and educational organizations with specially developed curriculum separate from traditional Scouting, and with distinctive programs that no longer used traditional Scouting methods like the Scout Oath and Scout Law. Participants in Learning for Life programs would be open to both sexes at all program levels (unlike the programs offered at the time by the Boy Scouts of America (BSA), including Cub Scouts and Boy Scouts), which allowed the BSA to provide in-school programs if the traditional girls' agencies are not able or willing to do so. All existing programs called In-School Scouting, as well as the large number of Career Awareness Exploring posts (where youth participation consisted primarily of career seminars during school hours) were rolled into Learning for Life. This had the immediate effect of dropping the membership totals of the BSA, but had no significant effect on the total numbers of youth served by the BSA when combining membership totals of traditional Scouting with the youth served totals of Learning for Life.

When a number of government agencies and community leaders began to seriously question the appropriateness of those agencies continuing to charter Exploring posts, BSA decided to reorganize the structure of Exploring programs. The decision was made in 1998 to separate work-based Exploring programs from those that were primarily focused on traditional BSA programming, hobbies, outdoors, and sports. The work-based Exploring posts and their membership were transferred to the Learning for Life affiliate, and the posts that were traditional to hobbies, outdoors, and sports were renamed Venturing crews and Sea Scout ships, and remained as part of the traditional BSA organization. Both posts and crews continue to serve the same age-groups of young women and men ages 15–20, but over the years, the terminology and methods of the Exploring and Venturing programs have evolved in separate directions, with Exploring continuing in a very non-traditional direction.

Almost every one of the 264 BSA Councils has at least one Exploring post, and about 90 have Learning for Life programs that are school-based groups. These groups and posts have youth who are described as participants and members of Learning for Life, but are not members of the BSA nor subject to membership restrictions such as faith requirements, other than minimum age requirements. The health and safety policies of Learning for Life are very similar to those used with BSA programs.

Youth Membership
Year	2010	2011	2012	2013	2014	2015	2016	2017
Exploring	113,180	112,783	116,584	114,894	110,853	110,348	119,841	114,751
Learning for Life	664,063	511,359	475,280	418,484	422,139	385,535	372,072	262,086

== Issues ==
=== Non-profit status and funding ===
Although the national Boy Scouts of America organized Learning For Life as an independent affiliate of their own organization, in the local Boy Scouts of America councils the Learning for Life program does not have a separate 501(c)3 non-profit status. This occasionally leads to difficulties with grant-making agencies that do not desire to indirectly support the BSA due to its policies (see Boy Scouts of America membership controversies). The Learning for Life Foundation exists so that local councils can apply for grants or funding from organizations or corporations that do not allow discrimination of any type. Councils work with the National Learning for Life Service Center to apply through the LFL Foundation and when funds are received, 100% of them are sent to the local council for use specifically with LFL/Exploring programs.

=== Leadership ===
Nationally, Learning For Life is an affiliate of the Boy Scouts of America's umbrella. The Learning for Life organization consists of a leadership team of national Learning for Life volunteers, including specialized committees for the various Exploring programs, and supported by seasoned senior executive professionals. These committees and professionals develop the curriculum and national programs for Learning for Life, and advise and provide support to the Learning for Life field offices across the United States and overseas.

Within local BSA councils, Learning for Life groups are supported through special committees of Learning for Life volunteers. The day-to-day support of Learning for Life and Exploring programs is provided by the council through one or more certified executives, either full-time Learning for Life professionals or equally often, through BSA commissioned professionals. These professionals, whether certified Learning for Life executives or BSA commissioned executives, are employees of the local BSA council.

=== Local Learning for Life marketing and promotions ===
Learning for Life on a council level may have its own version of a Key 3 (chair, vice chair and program executive), and in those cases will be responsible for creating its own subcommittees (finance, marketing, program, membership).
