= Leadership training of Scouting America =

Program of Scouting America

Scouting America Training
- Owner: Scouting America
- Headquarters: Irving, Texas
- Country: United States
- Affiliation: World Organization of the Scout Movement
- Website scouting.org

Leadership training in Scouting America includes training on how to administer the Scouting program, outdoor skills training for adults and youth, and leadership development courses for adults and youth. Some of these courses, like Safeguarding Youth Training (formerly known as Youth Protection Training) are mandatory. While a few are hosted at the national level (primarily at Philmont Training Center in New Mexico), most of the courses are offered by local councils or online. Most are available to all members of Scouting America in all programs.

== Adult leadership training ==
Depending on the adult volunteer's role the Boy Scouts require all adults to attend a variety of training and leadership programs. Every adult leader must annually complete Youth Protection Training. Each adult must also complete a Fast Start training specific to their program. Position-specific training is provided, including unit committee members, Den Leaders, Cubmasters, Scoutmasters, Unit Commissioners, and others. Skill-specific training is also available to gain knowledge in outdoors skills including camping, hiking, first aid, Leave No Trace, swim safety, climbing safety, hazardous weather, and other skills. The highest level of training available to Cub Scouting, Boy Scouting, and Venturing leaders is Wood Badge.

In 2010 the National Council added new content about diversity/inclusiveness, a communications patrol, and content on generations. Participants who complete Wood Badge are eligible to attend a new national course at Philmont Training Center. The Philmont Leadership Challenge mirrors the experience youth get at National Advanced Youth Leadership Experience.

=== High adventure training ===
The local council can offer high-adventure training to help prepare adults to conduct outdoor activities. Some councils used Powder Horn program to do this. Powder Horn was available to Venturing, Boy Scouting and Varsity Scouting leaders until it was retired in 2024. Adult leaders of Boy Scouts of America's Sea Scouting program can take Seabadge, which is offered by four BSA Regions in two or three locations each year. Additional high-level adventure programs are available at Philmont Training Center.

=== Wood Badge recognition ===
All Wood Badge graduates have been recognized since the program's inception with a leather thong decorated with two beads. Individuals who take part on staff are eligible to wear three beads, while Course Directors are recognized with four beads. These beads were presented to the first Wood Badge participants by Baden-Powell, who obtained them while on a military campaign in Zululand, from a Zulu king named Dinizulu.

=== National Camping School ===
National Camping School is a training program that takes place over the course of a week designed for summer camp staff members over the age of 18. There are many different sections of the program, and successful completion allows the individual to meet certain training requirements laid out in the National Camp Standards. Completion may allow the individual to become qualified in aquatics, COPE, climbing, camp administration, or other areas of camp staff.

== Youth leadership training ==
Scouts BSA members aged 10 to 17 are offered a variety of training programs. Scoutmasters are encouraged to offer Introduction to Leadership Skills for Troops, a unit level three-hour training session for all new youth leaders. The first program is designed to be run as-needed in a troop setting. The Scoutmaster and senior patrol leader will conduct this three-hour training whenever there are new Scouts or there has been a shift in leadership positions within the patrol or the troop. Venturing Crew members are offered a new course, Introduction to Leadership Skills for Crews.

The second course is a council-level, week-long National Youth Leadership Training (NYLT) usually held at a council camp. This course is an in-depth training program covering a variety of leadership ideas and skills. It is designed to simulate a month in the life of a Scouts BSA troop. It uses fun and hands-on learning sessions to teach leadership skills. The Scouts learn about service-based leadership as they undertake a patrol quest for the meaning of leadership.

The third program, National Advanced Youth Leadership Experience (NAYLE), is offered to a limited number of youth at the Philmont Training Center. Six courses will be offered in 2019. Transportation to and from Philmont is not included in the cost. Scouts are given an opportunity to expand their team building and ethical decision making skills learned in NYLT. NAYLE uses elements of Philmont Ranger training as well as advanced search-and-rescue skills to teach leadership, teamwork, and the lessons of selfless service. The NAYLE program is held in the Philmont wilderness where participants are taught leadership and teamwork using the elements of NYLT. It trains youth staff members from all regions to help lead council-level NYLT courses.

Venturing Crew members ages 14 through 21 of the Venturing program are encouraged to attend the Venturing Leadership Skills Course which is provided by the Venturing Crew or the local BSA council. Crew officers can attend Crew Officer Orientation. and then a council-provided Kodiak leadership training program.

=== National Council approves study ===
There were a few on the National Staff who strongly resisted the change to how leaders and youth were trained, including "Green Bar Bill" Hillcourt, who was loyal to the idea of teaching purely Scoutcraft skills and the Patrol Method at Wood Badge. While immensely respected for his many contributions to Scouting, Chief Scout Joseph Brunton overruled Hillcourt's objections and approved adapting the White Stag leadership competencies for nationwide use. Over the next several years, Larson repeatedly visited the Monterey Peninsula to observe and evaluate the White Stag program. He worked with Perin and Bánáthy to adapt the White Stag leadership competencies. Larson wrote the first syllabus for the adult Wood Badge program.

=== Back to basics program introduced ===
The BSA radically revised their handbook in 1972. The new handbook made learning outdoor skills optional for the three lower ranks and completely eliminated outdoor merit badges, including Camping, Cooking, Nature, Swimming, Lifesaving, from the required list for the higher three ranks. Under the new program, a Scout could reach First Class without hiking, camping or cooking over a fire. It was a disastrous failure for Scouting and membership plummeted.

William Hillcourt came out of retirement and donated a year of his life to write the 9th Edition of the Scout Handbook. It returned to the traditional Scouting program and had a great deal in common with Hillcourt's earlier Handbooks (6th & 7th Editions). It included entire paragraphs and pictures reprinted verbatim from the earlier editions.

=== Brownsea II focuses on Scoutcraft ===
In 1976, the BSA introduced Brownsea II (Brownsea Double Two) to supplement Troop Leadership Development. It was developed in reaction to the changes to Scouting, including the advancement rules that no longer required Scouts to take a hike before obtaining the First Class rank. The week-long course, unlike the Troop Leadership Program, was a "back-to-basics" program for Senior Patrol Leaders that was "program- and action-oriented." It emphasized teaching and practicing Scout skills, the purposes of Scouting, and the role of the patrol method within the troop program. Its goals were to develop leadership by giving Scouts opportunities to lead games that they could take back to the home troop, and by exposing the Scout to a leadership development project called "The Brownsea Pioneering Project".

=== Modifications implemented ===
In 1979, the next iteration of junior leader training was introduced in the Troop Leader Training Conference. It was published "to eventually replace Troop Leader Development (#6544) and also provide the Scoutcraft skills experiences of Brownsea Double Two." This paralleled a roll-back of an urban emphasis in Scouting which had removed mention of the word "campfire" from the 8th edition of the Boy Scout Handbook.

While the stated aim was to consolidate the two programs, many councils continued to produce both programs or used elements from the previous programs. This resulted in growing inconsistency in how junior leader training was delivered nationwide. In 1989 Pine Tree Camp, the Junior Leader Training Conference of the former Viking Council in Minneapolis, Minnesota was the proving grounds for a redesign of the Junior Leader Training Conference, a week-long leadership development program sponsored by local Councils for the top youth leaders of Scout troops.

In 1993, the BSA adapted the Pine Tree program's syllabus for national use. A team of volunteers revised the Junior Leader Training Conference, expanded each of the Scoutcraft activities to include learning objectives, added details of the games and contests, a list of materials and summary information. The national council also rewrote the leadership competencies Setting the Example, and to a lesser extent, Controlling the Group. A new concept called reflection was introduced. These sections of the syllabus suggested questions to assist the youth staff with drawing out from participants what they got out of a learning activity, to reinforce what they learned, and to help with evaluation at the end of each learning session.

The syllabus was revised once again in 1995 and renamed Junior Leader Training Conference Staff Guide. It presented modified versions of the eleven leadership competencies conceived of by Béla Bánáthy and still being presented by the White Stag program.

=== Program updated for nationwide use ===
After the Wood Badge program was updated in 2003, parallel changes were subsequently implemented that affected junior leader training. A junior leadership training Task Force was assembled during 2003-04 and undertook revisions to that program to bring it closer in alignment to the Wood Badge program. In 2003, the BSA pilot-tested a revised NYLT course in the Sam Houston Area Council under the name "Grey Wolf". Additional pilot courses were held in several BSA regions during 2004 and 2005. In 2005, they published the National Youth Leadership Training syllabus. Based on feedback from the youth themselves, the course was renamed using Youth in the title rather than Junior. The teens said they preferred the term "youth" over "junior", because "junior" gave the impression that the teens were not yet a leader where "youth" just described their age.

=== Standardization ===
Recent revisions have emphasized that NYLT is a national program and strongly discouraged variation from the minute-by-minute agenda. Local councils are instructed to be sure that their courses comply with the NYLT syllabus. Councils were permitted for several years to add a local, traditional name like "Pine Tree", "Silver Bear", or "Golden Acorn" to the NYLT course name, a practice which many councils had engaged in for a number of years. In 2009, the National council modified this stance and forbid councils to use any name but NYLT for the program. Not all councils adhere to this requirement. The Northern Star Council still calls their program "Grey Wolf", the Mecklenburg County Council still calls their course "Top Gun National Youth Leadership Training", and the San Francisco Bay Area Council still informally refers to their program as "Brownsea NYLT".
