= Camp Seminole =

Camp Seminole may be:

- Camp Seminole (Mississippi)
- Camp Seminole (Florida)
