= Yocona Area Council =

Scouting America local council

Yocona Area Council (#748)
- Owner: Scouting America
- Headquarters: Tupelo, Mississippi
- Country: United States
- Founded: 1926
- Scout Executive: Owen McCulloch
- President: Ronnie Bell
- Council Commissioner: Ty Robinson
- Website www.yocona.org

The Yocona Area Council of Scouting America serves 12 counties in northeast Mississippi including Alcorn, Benton, Itawamba, Lafayette, Lee, Marshall, Prentiss, Pontotoc, Tippah, Tishomingo, Union, and Yalobusha. The council headquarters is in Tupelo, Mississippi. The Yocona Area Council, supported by 1,100 volunteers, and 130 chartered partners, serves approximately 6,500 youth annually in one of five programs: Boy Scouts, Cub Scouts, Venturing, Learning for Life, and Exploring.

== History ==
The Yocona Area Council (#748) was founded in 1926.

One year after the Boy Scout movement had come to the United States from England around 1911 George F. Maynard Sr. founded the first troop in Tupelo — Troop 1. The local scout movement had its ups and downs the first several years as scout units sprung up in other cities such as Corinth and Oxford. In 1926 representatives from local communities met in Tupelo to establish scouting permanently in the area. In choosing a name for the new council, it was decided to call it "Yocona," an Indian name that would most nearly represent the entire council than any other. Yocona, or "Yakni," is a Choctaw Indian name for "the earth." In 1926, the Yocona Area Council consisted of Tate, Panola, Lee, Yalobusha, Marshall, Lafayette, Calhoun, Benton, Tippah, Union, Pontotoc, Alcorn, Prentiss, Tishomingo, and Itawamba counties. The first application for charter for the local council was dated June 25, 1926, and was given as a "First Class Council."

The first Camp Yocona was held at Springdale Lakes near Myrtle, Mississippi in July 1926. Camp Yocona moved around for the first several summer camps including locations in Booneville and Pickwick lake. A campsite located in Pontotoc County between Tocoppola and Randolph, consisting of 140 acres (0.57 km^{2}), was acquired in 1934 for the purpose of establishing a permanent camp for the Scouts of Yocona Area Council though it would take over 10 years for the camp to be established in 1946–1947.

In the 1930s scouting in the council experienced some growing pains. One of the greatest disasters to ever hit north Mississippi occurred on April 5, 1936. A tornado hit Tupelo cutting a path almost a mile wide. As a result of the disaster the Council Office was moved to New Albany. In the fall, it was returned to Tupelo at the request of the Regional Office in Memphis. The new office was in the Knox Building on West Main. In February 1939, the council was unable to financially retain a full-time professional largely due to the effects of the Great Depression. The Council Office was kept open under the direction of one office secretary until February 1940. Despite the effects of the 1930s, scouting remained viable in the council with the formation of the first Sea Scout Ship and Cub Pack as well as contingents to the National Jamboree and the wilderness camp Philturn (now known as Philmont) in New Mexico. The early 1940s were defined by World War II, but scouting continued throughout the war. In 1941 advanced scouts attending Camp Yocona were given the rare privilege of participating in the initiation ceremonies of the establishment of Chicksa Lodge 202. Chicksa Lodge became the local lodge of the Order of the Arrow, a service society of Honor Campers.

In 1943 a separate division, headed up by E.S. Bishop, was created for the council's African American scouts. Later that year the first scout camp was held for black troops. In 1947, Camp Warriner was conceived, established and developed through the leadership of Corinth Scouters. Dr. R.B. Warriner Sr. was instrumental in securing a site, five miles (8 km) south of Corinth, and in developing the facilities as the council's camp for black troops. In 1951 the council hired its first black district executive, Palmer Foster, who was one of the first African American executives in the south. During the first five months of 1969, the integration movement was underway and Camp Warriner was used less and less. In 1976, Camp Warriner was sold and the money was put into the Yocona Area Council Trust Fund.

In 1971, Erst Long Sr. purchased a building at 411 South Spring Street for the new Scout Service Center. This remained the Council Office until May 1989, when a new Service Center was built at 505 Air Park Road. Chauncey Godwin Sr. chaired the Finance Committee and Eddie Lomenick chaired the Building Committee that built the new facility which serves as the present location of the Yocona Area Council Service Center. Scouting in northeast Mississippi remained a strong and viable part of the community throughout the 1990s with record numbers of Eagle Scouts being produced almost every year.

In 2001, the Yocona Area Council celebrated its 75th Diamond Anniversary. During that year, a $1.5 million capital development campaign was successfully conducted to raise the funds necessary to renovate Camp Yocona. In 2004 phase 1 renovations were completed, with additional renovations continuing. Camp Yocona now host cabins, a conference center, first-class shooting sports ranges, a new aquatics facility, air-conditioned dining hall, and new restroom facilities in each campsite. These renovations along with major program updates helped spur a large increase in summer camp attendance during the late 2000s. In 2009 the council camped over 1,000 youth during summer camp programs.

In 2007 the council celebrated the 100th anniversary of the Scouting movement with the national theme "Scouting: When Tradition Meets Tomorrow." Then in 2010 the Council celebrated the 100th anniversary of the Boy Scouts of America, "Celebrating the Adventure, Continuing the Journey." The council kicked off the celebration in November 2009 with the Centennial Park Camporee, the largest event in council history. In February 2010 the council hosted the Adventure Base 100, a traveling scout exhibit which toured the country and included a traveling scouting museum.

== Districts ==
The Yocona Area Council is divided into three districts:

- Apilachi District serving Lee, Itawamba and Pontotoc counties
- Chicksa District serving Benton, Lafayette, Marshall, Union and Yalobusha counties
- Jacinto District serving Alcorn, Prentiss, Tippah and Tishomingo counties

== Funding ==
The Yocona Area Council is funded primarily by direct contributions from Scout families, individuals, corporations, alumni and service organizations through the annual Friends of Scouting campaign. These direct contributions form 50% of the council's income. Another 1.6% comes from the support of local United Way organizations. Other income includes camping activities 16.9%, fundraising events 10% and interest generated through operating and endowment funds 6.5%.

== Service ==
Through the Cub Scouting, Boy Scouting, and Venturing programs, the Yocona Area Council serves youth ages 6 through 20. The council offers Learning for Life, a character education program used by local schools. Explorer posts in the council offer vocation-oriented experience to teenage boys and girls in the council's 12 county area.

== Camp Yocona ==
Camp Yocona
- Location: Randolph, Mississippi
- Founded: 1946 - 1947
- Camp Ranger: Rick Crone
- Camp Director: David Rogers
- Website http://campyocona.org/

Camp Yocona is the Boy Scout camp serving the Yocona Area Council. The camp is located about 40 minutes from Tupelo and 90 minutes from Memphis on Hwy 334 between Pontotoc and Oxford. Camp Yocona is open year-round to Scout groups, other non-profit organizations, and corporations.

=== History ===
The very first Camp Yocona was held at Springdale Lakes near Myrtle, Mississippi in July 1926. The location of Camp Yocona moved around for the first several summer camps including locations in Booneville and Pickwick lake. A campsite located in Pontotoc County between Tocoppola and Randolph, consisting of 140 acres (0.57 km^{2}), was acquired in 1934 for the purpose of establishing a permanent camp for the Scouts of Yocona Area Council though it would take over 10 years for the camp to be established. On June 26, 1947, the dedication ceremonies of the permanent Camp Yocona were held in the central lodge on the campgrounds and the first week's camp was on June 29 of that same year.

In 2001, a $1.5 million capital development campaign was successfully conducted to raise the funds necessary to renovate Camp Yocona. In 2004 renovations were completed turning Camp Yocona into a first class camping facility, with additional renovations continuing. Camp Yocona now boosts cabins, a conference center, first class Shooting sports ranges, a new Aquatics facility, air conditioned dining hall, and new rest room facilities in each campsite. These renovations along with major program updates helped spur a large increase in summer camp attendance during the late 2000s. In 2009 the council camped over 1,000 youth during summer camp programs.

=== Facilities ===
Facilities include air-conditioned dining hall, conference center, administration building, health lodge, four air-conditioned staff cabins with restroom facilities, eight campsites with eight-person cabins and shower houses, two primitive campsites, two large pavilions, COPE course, waterfront with swimming docks and boating, and shooting sports facilities.

=== Activities ===
Camp Yocona is primarily a Boy Scout camp and is used for camporees, summer camps, winter camp, Scout leader training, Cub Scout campouts, and other Boy Scout-related events. The camp is also used year-round as a camping destination for unit campouts. In addition to scouting activities Camp Yocona often hosts church camps and other groups through the Challenging Outdoor Personal Experience program.

== Chicksa Lodge ==
Chicksa Lodge
- Headquarters: Tupelo, Mississippi
- Founded: 1941
- Founder: Curtis L. "Scottie" Carlisle
- Lodge Chief: Dylan Colucci
- Lodge Advisor: Vance Perkins
- Staff Advisor: Rick Wise
- Website http://chicksa.org/

The Order of the Arrow is represented by the Chicksa Lodge #202. It supports the Scouting programs of the council through leadership, camping, and service.

=== History ===
C. L. "Scottie" Carslile was scoutmaster of a troop in Corinth. Scottie had moved to northeast Mississippi from Atlanta, Georgia where he had worked with scouting. In 1941, Scottie brought a team from Atlanta to conduct the first induction ceremony in the state with Alex Beiler as the chief. The induction of a group took place at the first of the two weeks of summer camp. The boys inducted at the first ceremony served to induct a group during the last week of camp. This group of arrowmen make up the charter members of Chicksa 202. The lodge has been chartered and very active since then. The lodge name was derived from the first chief of the mighty Chickasaw Nation. The Chickasaw Nation settled and ruled in what is now northeast Mississippi until they ceded their lands to the United States of America.

=== Service ===
Chicksa Lodge devotes much of its service time to development and maintenance of Camp Yocona. The lodge is given the primary task of promoting camping in the council. The lodge plays an active role in council summer camp promotions as well as encouraging year round camping among units. The lodge publishes an online "Where To Go Camping Guide."

== See also ==
- Scouting in Mississippi
