= Kodiak (Boy Scouts of America) =

Youth leadership development program

- Owner: Boy Scouts of America
- Country: United States
- Awarded for: Leadership training
- Website http://www.kodiak-bsa.org/

Kodiak is the second level leadership development course for Venturers in the Boy Scouts of America's Venturing program.

Introduction to Leadership Skills for Crews is recommended but not required. Kodiak is the second course in the overall Venturing youth leadership development program called Nature of Leadership. When it was first being developed, Kodiak was being offered as Nature of Leadership Treks.

This training is one of several programs available within the youth leadership training program. Participants must complete unit-level training, National Youth Leadership Training or a special bridge course that has not yet been defined. This training is an element of the overall leadership training program.

It was announced on February 10, 2024, that Kodiak Challenge has been discontinued. From the announcement:

"As BSA continues to streamline and refine its trainings, the Kodiak Challenge, a field-based leadership training that originated in the Venturing program, is being discontinued in favor of utilizing the primary leadership elements of the Venturing program. Currently scheduled Kodiak courses for individual crews (through summer 2024) may continue as planned. All other courses at other levels (multi-crew, district, council, etc.) should be cancelled. New courses at any level should not be scheduled or held. The National Venturing Committee is currently working on a survey to be sent out to Venturing youth in order to make sure that we are moving forward in a manner that will meet the program needs of Venturers. This survey will contain elements surrounding training and we hope to have the survey sent out within the 1st quarter of 2024. As the survey data is received, it will help determine the training needs within the Venturing program."

== Kodiak ==
Kodiak is presented in a six-day (or 2 weekend) trek-oriented course. It may be conducted by a crew by a District or by a local Council. Because it is offered in a trek-format, Kodiak can be incorporated into a long-term high adventure trip by a crew. It is not intended to be offered as a camp-based retreat format.

Kodiak covers seven basic leadership concepts:

- Values and Vision
- Planning
- Communication
- Effective Teams
- Inclusiveness
- Ethical Decision Making
- Servant Leadership

The first two concepts (Values and Planning) are covered before the trek, and the last five are covered, one per day, during the trek.

Completion of the course is recognized by the presentation of the Kodiak medal, which is worn on the left pocket. As Kodiak is a youth course, adults should not wear the medal unless they are promoting a Kodiak course they are involved with.

== Kodiak X ==
Kodiak X was a weekend course put on by local councils, which uses leadership challenges to reinforce the skills learned in Kodiak, and introduces two new leadership commissions. It is intended to be offered at a camp, in a retreat/activity format. To participate in a Kodiak X course, the participant needs to have already completed a Kodiak course.

Kodiak X added the following leadership concepts:

- Evaluating Performance
- Mentoring

Completion of the course is (was) recognized by the presentation of the Kodiak X medal, which is worn on the left pocket. As Kodiak X is a youth course, adults should not wear the medal unless they are promoting a Kodiak X course they are involved with.

Kodiak X in its original form was retired in 2011. Evaluating Performance is being rolled into all training and Mentoring is now its own course for Venturing. As of 2015 there is not an official syllabus and recognition metals and patches are no longer available from the Scout stores.

== Kodiak/Kodiak X Course Director Course ==
BSA National offers a Course Director Course for those adults wishing to put on Kodiak/Kodiak X courses for their crews or in their local councils. Currently, this course is offered in a week-long format at Philmont Training Center and at the Florida Sea Base Conference Center, and in a weekend format at the regional level. While attendance at this CDC is not required to offer a Kodiak or Kodiak X course, it is encouraged. Attendance at this CDC may be required in the future to offer a Kodiak /Kodiak X course, however.
