= Mortimer L. Schiff Scout Reservation =

Boy Scout reservation in Mendham, New Jersey, U.S.

Schiff Scout Reservation
- Owner: Boy Scouts of America
- Location: Mendham, New Jersey
- Country: United States of America
- Coordinates: 40°45′0.63″N 74°37′46.83″W
- Founded: 1932
- Defunct: 1979

The Mortimer L. Schiff Scout Reservation, located in northern New Jersey, was a major Boy Scout training facility for almost 50 years. It was named after Mortimer L. Schiff, the father of John M. Schiff.

== Background ==
The original reservation comprised 400 acres (1.6 km^{2}) near Mendham, New Jersey and was in operation from 1932-1979. It was formally dedicated on October 18, 1933. The land was purchased for the BSA by Mrs. Jacob Schiff in memory of her son, Mortimer, who died while President of the BSA in 1931. During this time it served as the BSA's National Training Center and hosted the first Wood Badge courses held in the United States. Additionally, it served as the home of a Troop, with William "Green Bar Bill" Hillcourt serving as Scoutmaster. This Troop was used a proving ground for Hillcourt's ideas and was commonly used for photographs in Boys' Life and in the 1948 Fieldbook. It also hosted Explorer Post 604, an all Eagle Scout post dedicated to providing service for scouting events.

William "Green Bar Bill" Hillcourt is buried in Mendham, New Jersey near the Mortimer L. Schiff Scout Reservation, now within the Patriots' Path Council. Today over 310 acres (1.3 km^{2}) of the original 500 acres (2.0 km^{2}) of the camp are preserved as the Schiff Nature Preserve.

== Closure ==
After the National Council moved its headquarters in 1979 from New Brunswick, New Jersey to Irving, Texas, the Philmont Scout Ranch in New Mexico became the new home of the National Training Center.

When the Mortimer L. Schiff Scout Reservation was closed, Nassau County Council's (now called the Theodore Roosevelt Council) Camp Wauwepex in Wading River, New York was renamed as the John M. Schiff Scout Reservation, in honor of Mortimer's son, John.

== Men of Schiff ==
The reservation's anthem, sung communally in the dining hall, chanted for unity and faith in Scouting:

Men of Schiff together
Taking to the world,
Scouting ways forever
With flags and Banners
Mightily unfurled.
To our Oath and Scout Law
True we’ll always be,
With every council
Every region
Bound together in our legion
Men of Schiff are we.

== See also ==
- Scouting memorials
