= Scouts BSA =

Coed program of Scouting America for youth ages 11 to 17

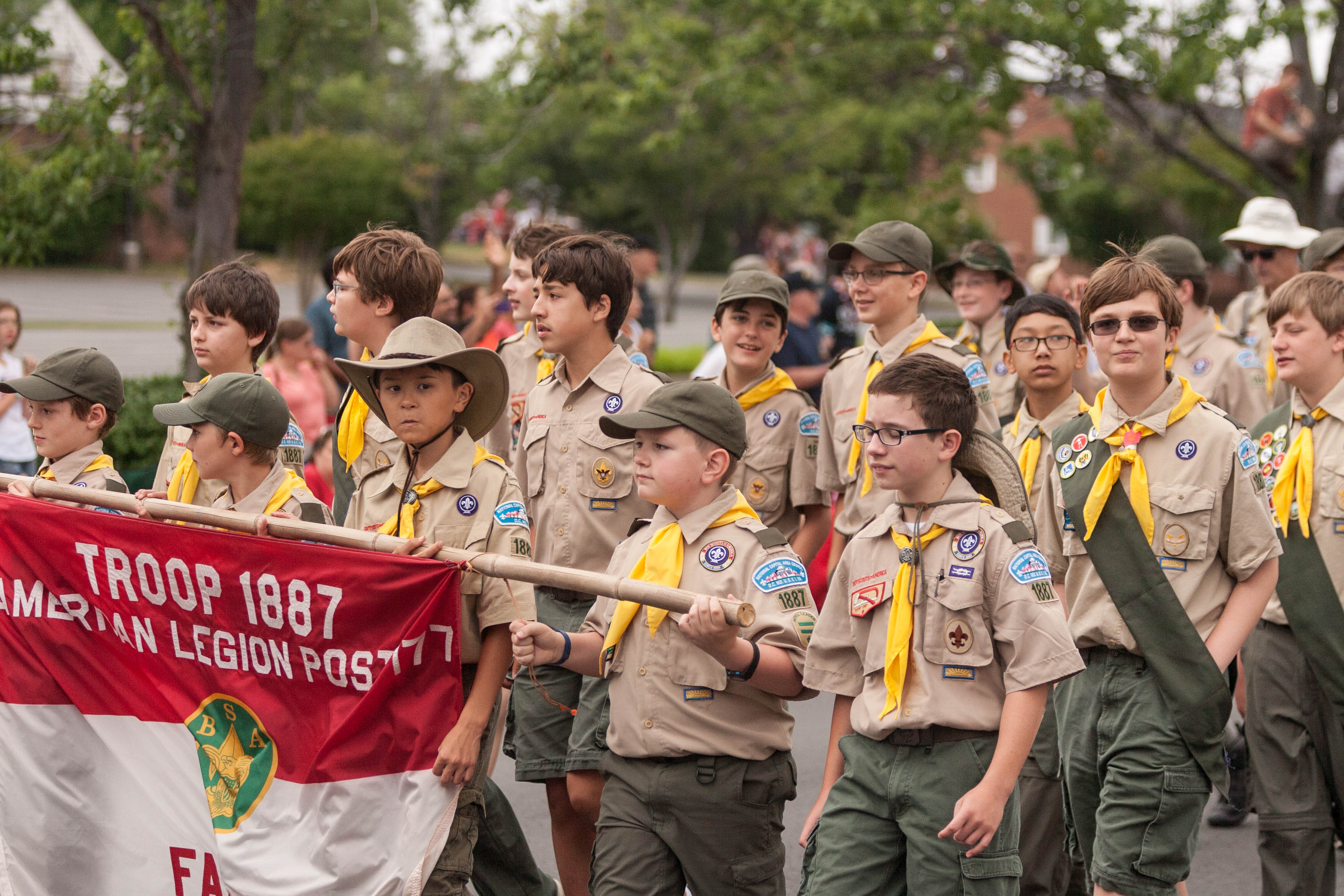
- Troop 1887, from Fairfax, Virginia, at a 4th of July celebration
- Owner: Scouting America
- Age range: 11 to 17 years
- Country: United States
- Founded: 1910
- Membership: 388,941 youth (2025); 21,242 troops (2023)
Previous; Cub Scouts	Next; Venturing; Sea Scouts
- Website scouting.org
- Standard uniform colors for Scouts BSA

Scouts BSA (known as Boy Scouts until 2019) is the flagship program and membership level of Scouting America for children and teenagers between the ages of typically 11 and 17. It provides youth training in character, citizenship, personal fitness, and leadership, and aims to develop the skills necessary to become successful adults.

To foster these skills, Scouting utilizes eight methods of Scouting to guide their educational programing: scouting ideals (as exemplified by the Scout Oath, the Scout Law, the Scout Motto, and the Scout Slogan), the patrol method of working in small groups, participation in outdoor programs, advancement and recognition for achievements, adult leaders, personal growth, leadership development, and the uniform.

The participants, also known as Scouts, are organized into small groups called Scout troops, which are each led by a youth leader, called the Senior Patrol Leader (SPL), as well as adult leaders, called Scouters. In February 2019, the program began admitting girls as well as boys, and the name of the program was changed from "Boy Scouts" to "Scouts BSA".

== Aims and Methods ==
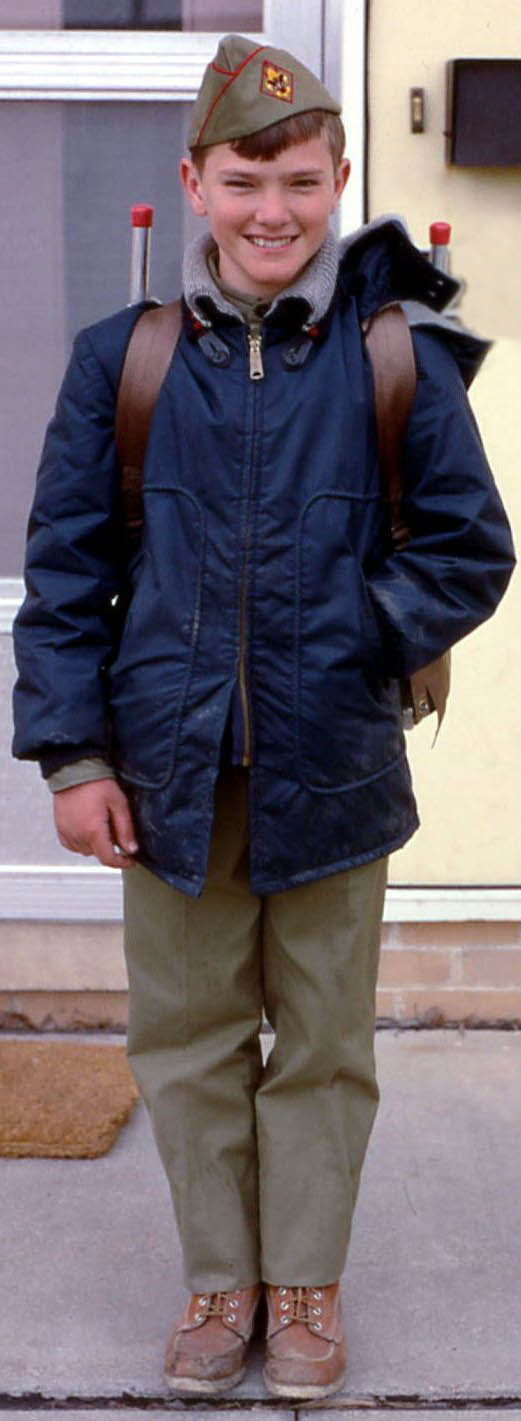
Boy Scout, 1969

Scouts BSA is focused on developing four skills: Character, Citizenship, Personal Fitness, and Leadership. These qualities are promoted through the eight methods of Scouting: scouting ideals (as exemplified by the Scout Oath, the Scout Law, the Scout Motto, and the Scout Slogan); the patrol method; advancement; adult association; participation in outdoor programs; personal growth; leadership development, and the uniform.

== Program and activities ==
Troop programs and activities are determined by the senior patrol leader and a council of adults under the oversight of the Scoutmaster. Troops generally hold meetings weekly, although they can be irregular during the summer. Troop meeting activities can include training in Scout skills to planning camping trips or playing games.

Troops may plan outings and activities outside the troop meeting, potentially involving outdoor programs such as camping, backpacking, hiking, canoeing, rafting, climbing, caving, or rappelling. These outings are intended to allow Scouts to work on skills and rank advancement, and have fun.

Most councils own and operate one or more permanent camps, that often host a variety of activities throughout the year. The BSA summer camp program provides a week-long session for troops that includes merit badge advancement and adventure activities. Camp facilities may include ranges for shooting sports (archery, rifle, and shotgun) or for climbing and rappelling.

It is common for several troops within a district or council to gather at least once a year at a special weekend campout called a camporee. A camporee is a district- or council-wide event where several units camp and engage in activities, Scoutcraft competitions and learn specialized skills.

The national Scout jamboree usually occurs every four years and draws more than 30,000 Scouts from across the country and the world. Since 2013, Jamborees have been held at The Summit Bechtel Family National Scout Reserve in West Virginia, which is a new high-adventure base and intended to be a more permanent home for the Jamboree.

=== Ideals ===
Several written elements are cornerstones of the program.

The Scout Law

A Scout is
- trustworthy,
- loyal,
- helpful,
- friendly,
- courteous,
- kind,
- obedient,
- cheerful,
- thrifty,
- brave,
- clean,
- and reverent. — Scouts BSA Handbook

The Scout Oath

On my honor, I will do my best
- To do my duty to God and my country
- And to obey the Scout Law;
- To help other people at all times;
- To keep myself physically strong, mentally awake, and morally straight. — Scouts BSA Handbook

The Scout Motto

Be Prepared! — Scouts BSA Handbook

The Scout Slogan

Do a Good Turn Daily — Scouts BSA Handbook

The Outdoor Code

As an American, I will do my best:
- to be clean in my outdoor manners,
- to be careful with fire,
- to be considerate in the outdoors, and
- to be conservation-minded — Scouts BSA Handbook

The goal of the Scouting program is for Scouts to embody these ideals, as well as memorize and understand them.

The Scout Sign is used when giving the Scout Law or the Scout Oath and as a signal for silence. The Scout Salute is used when saluting the flag of the United States. The left-handed handshake is used as a token of friendship and forms connections between Scouts worldwide.

=== Emblems ===
First Class emblem

Scouting uses a collection of medals and patches with emblems, which represent a Scout's specific achievements. The badge for the Scout rank consists of a simple fleur-de-lis, which symbolizes a compass rose. The compass symbolically points the Scout in the right direction, which is onward and upward. The three points of the fleur-de-lis, along with the three-finger salute represent the three parts of the Scout Oath (duty to God and Country, duty to others, duty to oneself).

The Tenderfoot badge utilizes the fleur-de-lis of the Scout badge and adds two stars and the eagle and shield from the Great Seal of the United States. The stars symbolize truth and knowledge; the eagle and shield symbolize freedom and readiness to defend it. The Second Class badge features a scroll inscribed with the Scout Motto, with the ends turned up and a knotted rope hanging from the bottom. The knot is intended to remind each Scout to remember the Scout slogan and the upturned ends of the scroll symbolize cheerfulness in service. The First Class badge combines the elements of the Scout, Tenderfoot and Second Class badges.

For years, the First Class badge was used as the emblem of the BSA. The Star rank has a First Class symbol on a five-pointed yellow star, which initially indicated the five merit badges required to earn the rank. Life has a First Class emblem on a red heart, and initially symbolized the first-aid and health-related merit badges that the rank required. Now it signifies that the ideals of Scouting have become a part of the Scout's life and character.

=== Equipment ===
In the United States, the Boy Scouts of America functions as a licensor and distributor of official Scout uniforms, camping gear, and other items since the 1920s. These include backpacks, pocket knives, belt knives, tents, sleeping bags, canteens, and mess gear.

=== Uniform and insignia ===
The uniform and insignia of the Scouts BSA gives a Scout visibility and creates a level of identity within both the unit and the community. While BSA uniforms are similar in basic design, they do vary in color and detail to identify the different programs of Cub Scouts, Scouts BSA, Venturers, and Sea Scouts. The uniform is used to promote equality while showing individual achievement.

Scouts BSA youth and adult leaders wear the Scout uniform. It generally consists of a khaki button-up shirt, olive green pants or shorts, belt, socks, and optional neckerchief. The Scouter dress uniform is appropriate for professional Scouters and Scouting leaders on formal occasions.

== Organization ==
=== Troop and patrols ===
The scout troop is the fundamental unit of Scouts BSA. The troop size can vary from a minimum of five Scouts to over one hundred. Each troop is sponsored by a community organization such as a business, service organization, private school, labor group, or religious institution. The chartering organization is responsible for providing a meeting place and promoting a good program. A chartering organization representative manages the relationship between the troop, the chartering organization, and the BSA.

While both boys and girls are members of Scouts BSA, as of 2024 individual troops are single gender. A boys' troop and girls' troop may however share a common Troop Committee made up of adult leaders, parents of Scouts, and other interested parties that manage membership, finances, camping arrangements, and chartering organization relations among other responsibilities.

Each troop is divided into patrols of about eight Scouts led by a patrol leader elected from within the patrol. Patrol meetings are generally held during the weekly troop meeting. The patrol's independence from the troop varies among troops and between activities. Patrols' autonomy becomes more visible at campouts, where each patrol may set up its own camping and cooking area. Divisions between patrols may disappear during an event which only a small part of the troop attends. Patrols may hold meetings and even excursions separately from the rest of the troop.

When a Cub Scout group crosses over from Cub Scouting to Scouts BSA, the "new Scout patrol" method may be used. The new Scouts are kept together as a group, elect their own patrol leader, and are assigned a troop guide—an older Scout who acts as a mentor. Some troops may have an older Scout patrol that experiences more autonomy from the troop and provides older Scouts with expanded social contact and physical challenges.

=== Other programs ===
Lone Scout logo

The Lone Scout program serves youth who cannot take part in a nearby troop on a regular basis because of distance, weather, time, disability, or other difficulties. While the Lone Scout does not participate in troop or patrol activities, they may still participate in the values, and achievements of Scouting.

The Order of the Arrow (OA) is a program of the Scouts BSA, Venturing, and Sea Scouts divisions of the BSA. It is the BSA's national honor society for experienced campers, based on Native American traditions, and dedicated to the ideal of cheerful service. Scouts and Scouters must belong to a troop, crew, or ship to become OA members. The OA is run by youth under the age of 21 with adult Scouters serving as advisers.

From 1984 to 2017, Varsity Scouting was a part of the Scouts BSA division of the BSA. It was an alternative available to boys ages fourteen through seventeen that took basic Boy Scouting and adds high adventure, sporting, and other elements that are more appealing to older youth to accomplish the aims of character development, citizenship training, and personal fitness. Varsity Scouts were organized into teams, which were separate chartered units from a Boy Scout troop. Varsity Scouts participated in the standard Boy Scouting advancement program along with programs unique to Varsity Scouting.

== Advancement and recognition ==
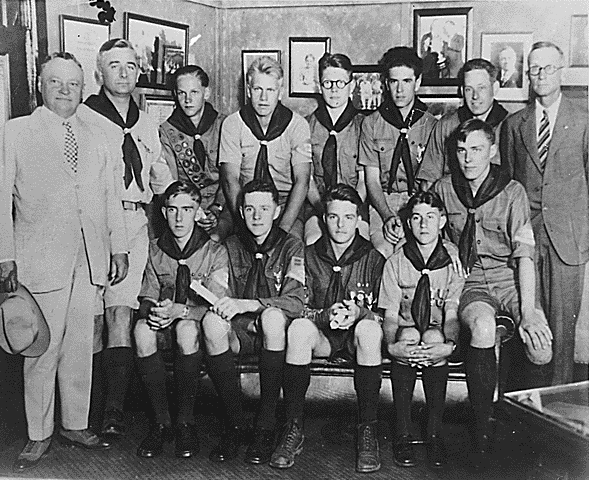
Michigan Eagle Scouts in 1929, including President Gerald Ford at age 16

=== Youth advancement ===
Scouts BSA has seven ranks that can be earned, grouped into two phases. The first phase of Scout, Tenderfoot, Second Class, and First Class is designed to teach Scoutcraft skills, teamwork, and self-reliance. Scout is the first rank, and requires demonstration of knowledge of Scouting's ideals, the process of rank advancement, troop and patrol structure, and some basic skills (e.g., knot-tying and knife safety). As with all other ranks, a Scoutmaster conference is also required. Further ranks have progressive requirements in the areas of Scoutcraft, physical fitness, citizenship, personal growth, and Scout Spirit. These ranks also require participation in a Board of Review. Scouts with a permanent mental or physical disability may use alternate requirements, based on their abilities and approved by the council.

The second phase of Star, Life, and Eagle is designed to develop leadership skills and encourage the Scout to explore potential vocations and avocations through the merit badge program. These ranks require that the Scout serve in a position of responsibility and perform community service.

The Eagle Scout rank requires, in addition to merit badges and a position of responsibility, a community service project planned and led entirely by the Eagle Scout candidate. After attaining the rank of Eagle, a Scout may earn Eagle Palms for additional tenure and merit badges.

Although Eagle is the highest rank Scouts may achieve, the number of Scouts achieving the rank of First Class within one year of joining is still one of the key measures of unit effectiveness. Studies have shown that if a Scout achieves First Class within a year of joining, they typically stay in Scouting for at least three years. Scouts who do so are more likely to retain Scout values as an adult, thus achieving the BSA's primary mission.

Ranks and other recognition are presented in a troop awards ceremony called the court of honor. The Eagle Scout rank is usually presented in a separate and special court of honor.

=== Adult recognition ===
Scouts BSA leaders who complete training, tenure, and performance requirements are recognized by a system of awards, often represented by "knots" on the uniform, for various accomplishments. One of the more intensive Scout leader training programs is Wood Badge, for which successful participants receive a special neckerchief, woggle and wooden beads on a thong.

Adults may also earn Order of the Arrow ranks and awards in the same manner as Scouts.

=== Awards ===
Several religious emblems programs are administered by various religious institutions and are recognized by the BSA. These are generally recognized by a medal and an embroidered square knot. Other advancements and recognitions—such as the Nova (and Supernova) Awards, 50-miler award, BSA Aquatic Awards, Emergency Preparedness Award, Outdoor Ethics Award and World Conservation Award — are available to Scouts who show proficiency in special areas. These are all awarded at a Court of Honor.

BSA's National Court of Honor is responsible for lifesaving and meritorious awards. All Courts of Honor for Eagle Scout rank also are convened as National Courts of Honor.

== Leadership in the troop ==
Every troop has two separate leadership structures: one consisting of Scouts and another consisting of adults. The adult leadership manages the logistics of troop activities, administers rank advancement and awards, maintains troop records and finance, and recruits new Scouts and adult leaders. The youth leadership keeps order and coordinates labor at activities. Scouts and adults cooperate to plan agendas for troop meetings, as well as the troop's schedule of outings.

=== Adult leadership ===
The troop Key 3 are the primary adult leaders for a troop. The Key 3 are the chartered organization representative, the committee chair and the scoutmaster. The chartered organization appoints the chartered organization representative. The chartered organization representative appoints the committee chair. The troop committee chair appoints and supervises the unit committee and unit leaders, and organizes the committee to see that all committee responsibilities are delegated, coordinated and completed. The chartered organization representative and local council must approve the registration of the troop's adult leaders. The committee chair leads the committee and appoints its members to specific tasks such as treasurer, secretary, advancement, activities, equipment, and membership. The Scoutmaster must be at least twenty-one and is directly responsible for training and guiding the youth leaders, working with other adults to bring Scouting to youth, and for using the methods of Scouting to achieve the aims of Scouting. A troop may have a chaplain who helps to provide a spiritual element in the unit program, provides spiritual counseling as needed, and encourage Scouts to participate in the religious emblems program.

=== Youth leadership ===
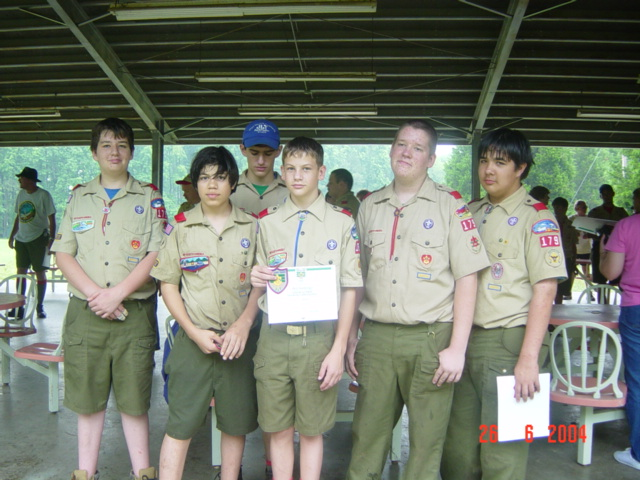
Five new graduates of BSA's Junior Leader Training, June 2004

The youth leader in charge of the troop is the senior patrol leader (SPL). The SPL "[M]ust be elected by the majority of youth members registered in the troop]". The SPL is responsible for the overall performance of the troop, runs troop meetings and ensures that the program for troop meetings and other activities is carried out. They also appoint youth to fill all other positions of leadership and responsibility (with the consent of the Scoutmaster). There may also be one or more Assistant Senior Patrol Leaders (ASPL). Each patrol elects a patrol leader who then appoints an assistant patrol leader and other positions within the patrol. Together, the senior patrol leader, assistant senior patrol leader, and patrol leaders make up the patrol leaders council (PLC), the group of Scouts that is responsible for developing the troop's program with the advice of the Scoutmaster.

There are other youth positions of responsibility in a troop; the use of these positions is dependent on the size of the troop and the program. The junior assistant Scoutmaster (JASM) is a 16- or 17-year-old Scout who performs the same duties as an assistant Scoutmaster; the scribe takes minutes at patrol leaders council meetings and troop meetings and is often responsible for taking attendance and collecting money or dues; the quartermaster maintains the troop's equipment; the librarian maintains the troop library; the chaplain aide works with the troop chaplain and promotes the religious program in the troop; the troop historian maintains photos and records of troop functions, meetings and outings; a den chief works with a den of Cub Scouts, assisting the den leaders and helps retain Cub Scouts when they cross over into Scouts BSA; the troop guide is a senior Scout who provides guidance to new Scout patrols; the Leave No Trace Coordinator ensures the Scouts are trained in and follow Leave No Trace Guidelines; the Order of the Arrow representative provides a line of communication between the Order of the Arrow and the troop; the bugler provides music as needed; the instructor teaches Scout skills. These troop positions are appointed by the senior patrol leader with the advice and counsel of the Scoutmaster, except for the Junior Assistant Scoutmaster, who is appointed by the Scoutmaster. Some positions may also be determined by election.

=== Development ===
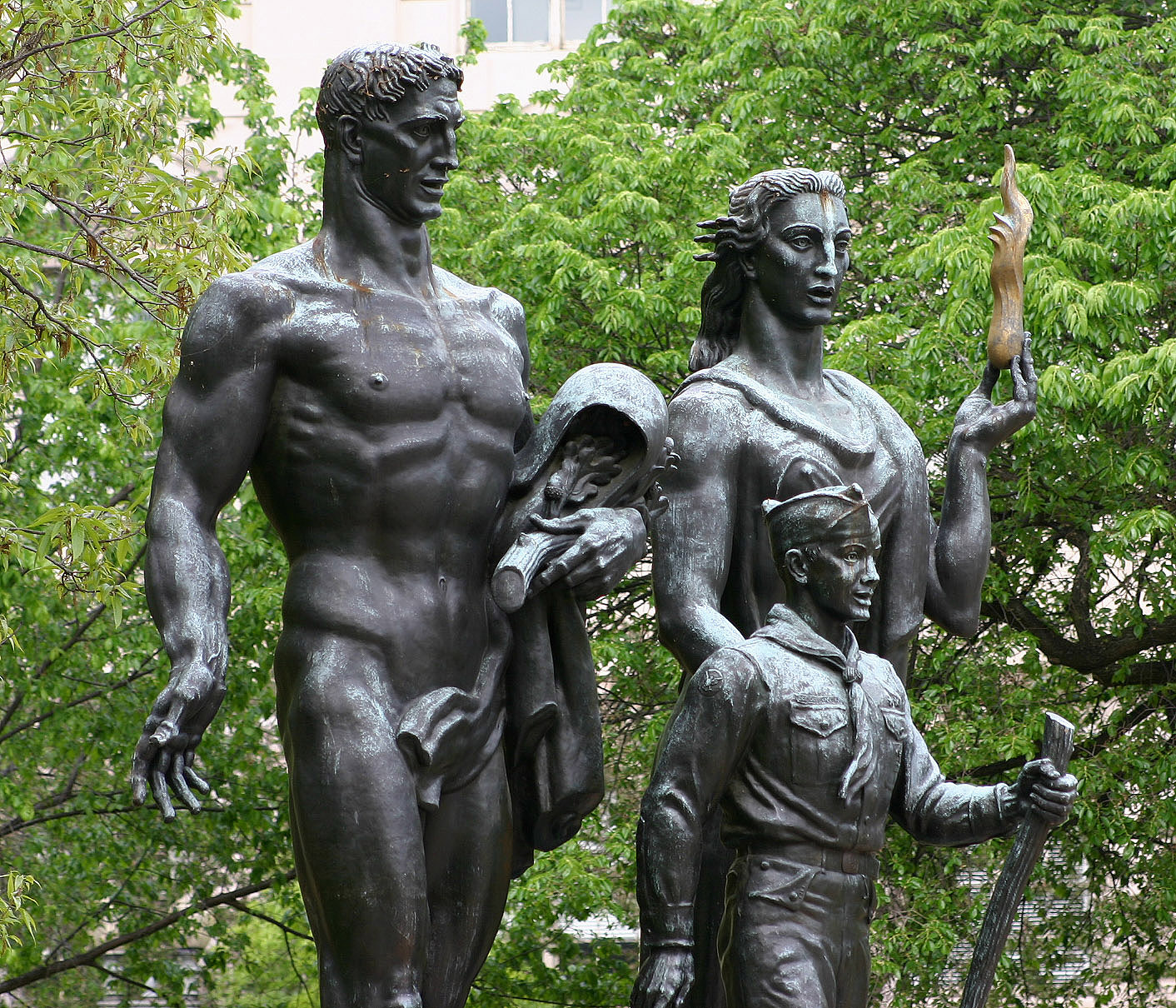
Boy Scout Memorial in President's Park, Washington, D.C.

The Scouts BSA has a defined Youth Leadership Training Continuum to provide a growth path for youth leaders. The Scoutmaster provides Introduction to Leadership Skills for Troops (ILST) at the troop level. Youth leaders are encouraged to attend National Youth Leadership Training (NYLT) at the council level and a select few may progress to National Advanced Youth Leadership Experience (NAYLE) at the national level.

New adult leaders are required to attend training for their position. This training provides the essential information they need to provide a safe and successful quality program. In addition to position-specific training, all adults are required to complete Youth Protection Training (YPT). This program covers the BSA policies on preventing child abuse, including types and signs of abuse, how to respond to disclosed abuse and how to report suspected abuse. YPT recertification is required every two years and may be completed online. Introduction to Outdoor Leader Skills (IOLS) is another course that is required for Scoutmasters and Assistants Scoutmasters and furthers instruction in Scouting and outdoor skills. Once completed, the "Trained" emblem may be worn on the sleeve. The troop committee chairman and members should attend the Troop Committee Challenge for instruction in administering the program. This completes Basic Leader Training for these positions and the Trained emblem may be worn on the left sleeve.

Supplemental training modules are designed to provide instruction beyond Basic Leader Training. These shorter training sessions are often provided at the District/Council Roundtable, a monthly meeting of leaders from the district, at a University of Scouting event offered by the local councils, or at National Training Conferences held at the Philmont Training Center and the Florida National High Adventure Sea Base. Additional training events may be held at summer camps, Council events, and various BSA-sponsored events.

At least one leader with current Safe Swim Defense training is required for swimming activities. Boating activities require Safety Afloat and CPR training. Climb on Safely training and CPR certification are required for climbing and rappelling events.

Wood Badge is advanced training for leadership skills for adults in the BSA. Wood Badge consists of five days of training (usually presented as two, nonconsecutive weekends) and an application phase of several months. When training is complete, leaders are recognized with the Wood Badge beads, neckerchief, and woggle. Powder Horn is a high adventure resource course designed to help Scout leaders to safely conduct outdoor activities of a fun and challenging nature, provide an introduction to the resources necessary to successfully lead their youth through a program of high adventure and to understand what is involved in different high adventure disciplines.

== Outdoor education ==
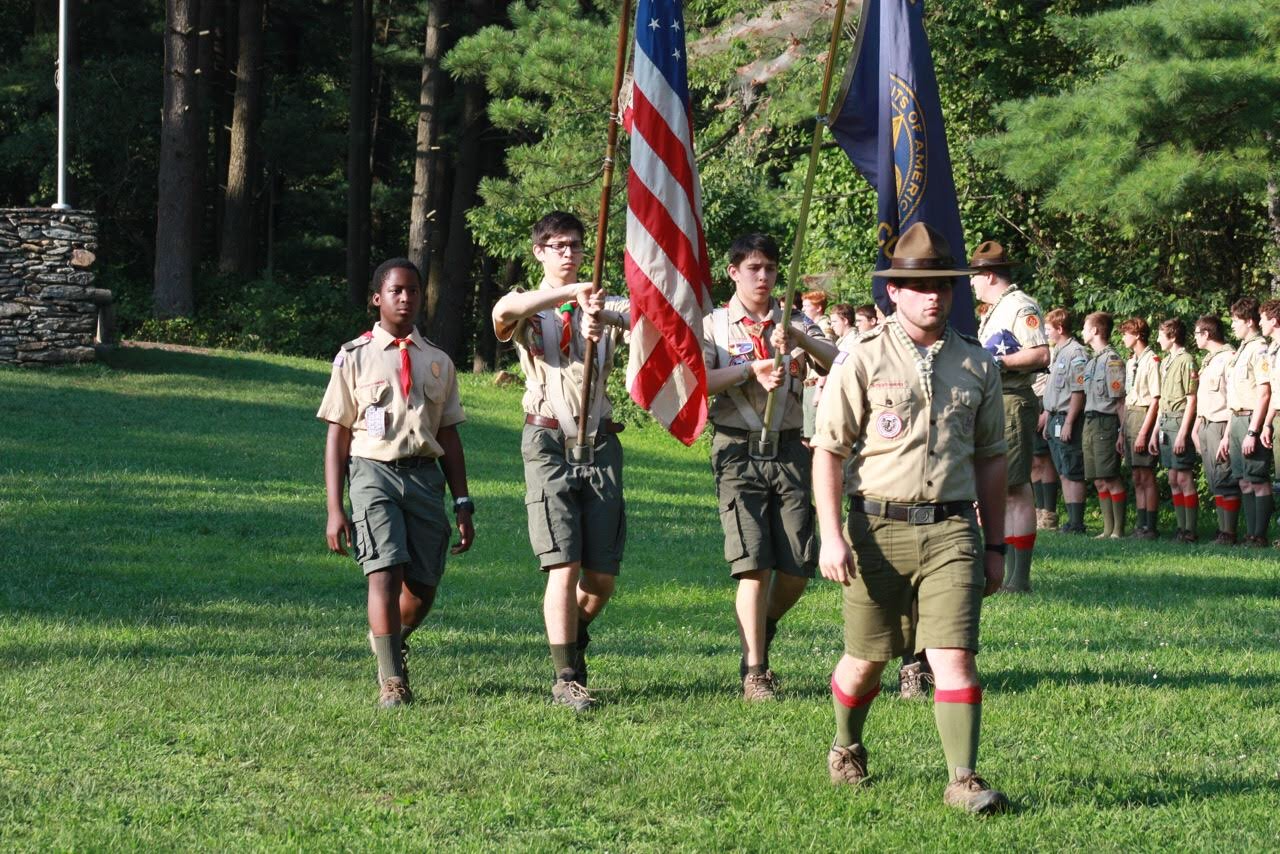
Scouts and the evening colors at Horseshoe Scout Reservation

"A week of camp life is worth six months of theoretical teaching in the meeting room."— Baden-Powell

Since its founding in 1907 by Baden-Powell, the Scouting movement has employed employs non-formal education with an emphasis on practical outdoor activities. Scouts see adventure in nature, and it is this adventure which draws them to learning.

For its members, the Scout method is part of the program to instill typical Scouting values such as trustworthiness, good citizenship, and outdoors skills, through a variety of activities such as camping, aquatics, and hiking. This also represented by the Outdoor Code.

The local councils of the Boy Scouts of America operate several hundred local camps. The national organization operates several high-adventure bases. These include Philmont Scout Ranch, Northern Tier National High Adventure Bases, Florida National High Adventure Sea Base, and The Summit Bechtel Family National Scout Reserve.

== See also ==
- History of the Boy Scouts of America

== Bibliography ==
- The Boy Scout Handbook (11th ed.). Irving, Texas: Boy Scouts of America. 1998. ISBN 0-8395-3105-2.
- Boy Scout Handbook (2 ed.). New York: Boy Scouts of America. 1925.
- Baden-Powell, Robert (1933). "10". Lessons from the Varsity of Life. Archived from the original on December 2, 2006 – via pinetreeweb.com.
- Fieldbook: The BSA's Manual of Advanced Skills for Outdoor Travel, Adventure, and Caring for the Land. Boy Scouts of America. 2004. ISBN 978-0839531043. Archived from the original on February 24, 2017 – via BSA Troop 577.
- Guide to Advancement. Boy Scouts of America. 2021. ISBN 978-0-8395-3088-6.
- BSA Troop Committee Guidebook. Irving, TX: Boy Scouts of America. 1990. ISBN 0-8395-6505-4. OCLC 19345019.
- "The Chartered Organization Representative Guidebook" (PDF). scoutingwire.org. Boy Scouts of America. 2015.
- Insignia Guide. Boy Scouts of America. 2007. ISBN 978-0-8395-3066-4. #33066. Archived from the original on November 29, 2007.
- "Manual for Chaplain Aides and Chaplains". Boy Scouts of America. 2008. Archived from the original on June 30, 2008.
- "Guide to Safe Scouting". Boy Scouts of America. February 2022.
- Davis, Ken (2000). Brotherhood of Cheerful Service: A History of the Order of the Arrow (3rd ed.). Boy Scouts of America. ISBN 9780839549987.
- Block, Nelson (2000). A Thing of the Spirit, The Life of E. Urner Goodman. Boy Scouts of America.
- Davis, Kenneth P. (1990). A History of Wood Badge in the United States. Boy Scouts of America. ISBN 9780839501237.
- Scoutmaster Handbook. Irving, Texas: Boy Scouts of America. 1998.
