= Wood Badge (Scouting America) =

Highest level of adult training in Scouting America

- Owner: Scouting America
- Country: United States
- Founded: 1948
- Founder: William "Green Bar Bill" Hillcourt

Wood Badge in the United States is an advanced leadership training course available to adult leaders of Scouting America. The first Wood Badge course was presented in England by the founder of Scouting, Baden-Powell, and he introduced the program into the United States during a visit in 1936. The first course was held at the Mortimer L. Schiff Scout Reservation, but Americans did not fully adopt Wood Badge until 1948. The National Council of Scouting America provided direct leadership to the program through 1958, when the increased demand encouraged them to permit local councils to deliver the training.

The program originally focused almost exclusively on Scoutcraft skills, some elements of the Patrol Method, and First Class Scout requirements. In a major cultural shift during the 1970s, Wood Badge was modified to train Scouters in eleven specific leadership competencies. The National Council has updated it several times since then, and during 2001–2002 implemented an overhaul that emphasized a prototypical troop as a method for teaching team leadership and problem-solving skills. The training is delivered through a lecture classroom environment and a short outdoor camping experience. It is a key element of the overall leadership training program.

== Slow adoptions ==
Francis Gidney, the first camp chief of Gilwell Park, came to the United States in 1922 at the instigation of Walter W. Head, a member of the Boy Scouts of America National Board, and later its President. While Gidney demonstrated some of the Scoutcraft tricks from Gilwell, his ideas did not arouse interest, but were treated as entertainment by the American audience. A number of American Scouters later traveled to England and took the British Wood Badge course. These included assistant director of Volunteer Training Gunnar Berg and assistant director of camping William C. Wessel. Though the national training department approved a "Gillwill Training Camp" to be held at Camp Parsons in 1929 (conducted by John A. Stiles, the Chief Scout Executive of Canada), the prevailing attitude of the Boy Scouts of America was that American men would not set aside eight days from their busy lives to attend the course.^{[a]}

=== Shift away from the British course ===
In 1935, BSA President Walter W. Head attended the eighth International Boy Scout Conference in Stockholm, Sweden. He met with James E. West, Scouting's founder Baden Powell, and his aide, Gilwell Park's second camp chief John Skinner Wilson. Wilson was persuaded to visit the United States during 1936 and spend three months teaching others about Wood Badge. During May 1936, he conducted two Wood Badge courses at Mortimer L. Schiff Scout Reservation. Wilson had been told to "follow the book" as it was done in England, which he faithfully did, including the English menu with dishes like boiled leg of lamb and boiled ham. Wilson had a reputation as a "dour Scot" and he brooked no discussion during his course. William Hillcourt was a participant in that first course and four days later, he was the senior patrol leader for the second course. He received his Wood Badge beads in 1939 and was appointed as the deputy camp director for Wood Badge.

Some American Scouters chafed under Wilson's authoritarian attitude. They found the course much too restrictive, demanding, and altogether too "British." They felt the course would not work in the United States and recommended to the National Council that the program should not be adopted, which was followed. Before further experimentation could be implemented, World War II interrupted any ideas of men taking time off for Scouting.^{[a]}

=== Adapted for American training ===
After the war ended, new Gilwell Park camp chief John Thurman was interested in persuading the Boy Scouts of America to adapt Wood Badge. The new Chief Scout Executive Elbert K. Fretwell was an educator and training enthusiast. He was convinced to allow a few members of the Program Division and Volunteer Training Service to try a new National Wood Badge Course. Four national staff members were given the responsibility: Frank W. Braden (assistant director of the Program Division and national coordinator of Training), William E. Lawrence (director of the Boy Scouting Service), Joseph M Thomas (assistant director of Volunteer Training), and William "Green Bar Bill" Hillcourt (national director of Scoutcraft).^{[a]}

Hillcourt had received his Wood Badge beads in 1939, making him the only national staff member eligible to serve as course Scoutmaster. He was appointed "Deputy Camp Chief of the United States." The four men elected to include in the course all of the recently updated basic Boy Scout requirements for Tenderfoot to First Class, along with information on patrol work covered in the Handbook for Patrol Leaders (authored by Hillcourt) and troop organization and activities described in the Handbook for Scoutmasters (also written by Hillcourt).^{[a]}

They added American touches to the course. They used the names of American birds for patrol names; challenged patrols to make their own flags instead of using store-bought flags; introduced patrol totems and signatures; and added singing Back to Gilwell when each patrol's name was mentioned. Each member took turns as the patrol leader, and they met daily as the Patrol Leaders Council to conduct daily inspections. The staff taught course attendees basic Scout requirements and how to handle the U.S. flag. The patrols took an unsupervised patrol hike and overnight camp. Other American features included a program and a service patrol, a cracker barrel after each evening's event, a feast, and other ceremonies. The first course, begun on July 31, 1948, was attended by 29 men from 12 states. Although it rained on four of the nine days, the Scouters were excited by the experience and enthusiastic about sharing it with others.^{[a]}

=== New course tested ===
Later in 1948, six courses were led by members of the national BSA staff, with one at Mortimer L. Schiff Scout Reservation and another at Philmont Scout Ranch. Scouters were enthusiastic about the new course. "Perhaps the finest experience we have had in 35 years of Scouting was attending the Wood Badge course in New Mexico... Any man who lived nine days in a Gilwell Troop would know how a troop is operated." The new Chief Scout of the Boy Scouts of America, Arthur A. Schuck, was a training enthusiast. He felt Wood Badge would be a great opportunity to train selected men who could return to their local councils and train others.^{[a]}

=== National council presents program ===
From 1948 through 1958, Wood Badge was presented exclusively by the National Council of the Boy Scouts of America. In 1955, John Thurman, the Camp Chief of Gilwell, toured a number of U.S. Wood Badge courses. His assessment and comments helped to continue to improve the program on both the national and local council levels. Attendees from local councils were carefully screened, needing the "unqualified endorsement of the Council's Leadership Training Committee and the Scout Executive."^{[a]} The first Cub Scout Wood Badge beads awarded to a woman were given to Rebekeh T. Weir in 1957. Her husband, Rev. Thomas E. Weir, had already received his beads, which made them the first American couple to both receive Wood Badge beads.

Through 1958, over 6000 individuals took Wood Badge and its popularity continued to expand. Local councils agitated for the opportunity to run their own Wood Badge courses. In 1953, the first council-run program was hosted by the Cincinnati Area (later Dan Beard) Council.^{[a]} Qualified local councils continued to provide advanced leadership training to Scoutmasters and other Scout leaders using Wood Badge. Two or more councils are allowed to join together to present Wood Badge with regional approval.

In the 1970s, the National Council moved its headquarters from North Brunswick, New Jersey to Irving, Texas, and the national training center from Mortimer L. Schiff Scout Reservation to the Philmont Training Center. However, the majority of Wood Badge courses are held throughout the country at local council camps under the auspices of each BSA region.

== Change from camping to leadership ==
The Wood Badge program originally focused exclusively on teaching Scoutcraft skills, the Patrol Method and First Class Scouting requirements.

=== White Stag program draws national attention ===
Beginning in the 1950s, Béla H. Bánáthy, Chairman of the Leadership Training Committee of the Monterey Bay Area Council, formulated the idea of an experimental leadership training program. He named it White Stag Leadership Development after the white stag of Hungarian mythology, the emblem of the Fourth World Scout Jamboree, which Bela had attended when he was 14 years old. With the active interest and support of the Monterey Bay Area Council executive staff and board, Bela continually improved his experimental program. In 1963 Maury Tripp and Fran Peterson were working closely with Bela. They also served on the National Council of the Boy Scouts of America and brought the White Stag program to their attention. In November 1963, Dr. John W. Larson, a staff researcher for the National Council, observed the program's annual Indaba at the Presidio of Monterey. Impressed with what he witnessed, he recommended that the national office conduct a detailed analysis of the White Stag program.^{[a]}

During a thorough study, the national BSA staff interviewed participants, parents, and leaders. They distributed questionnaires to program participants, reviewed the White Stag literature, and observed the program in action. They also conducted a statistical analysis of troops taking part in White Stag and compared them to non-participating units. In December 1965, Chief Scout Executive Joseph Brunton received the White Stag Report. It stated that offering leadership development to youth was a unique opportunity for Scouting to provide a practical benefit to youth and would add substantial support to Scouting's character development goals. It recommended that Wood Badge should be used to experiment with the leadership development principles of White Stag.^{[a]} The program had until this time taught the adults the same Scoutcraft skills a boy was required to learn to become a First Class Scout along with concepts of the patrol method.

=== Focus shifts to leadership skills ===
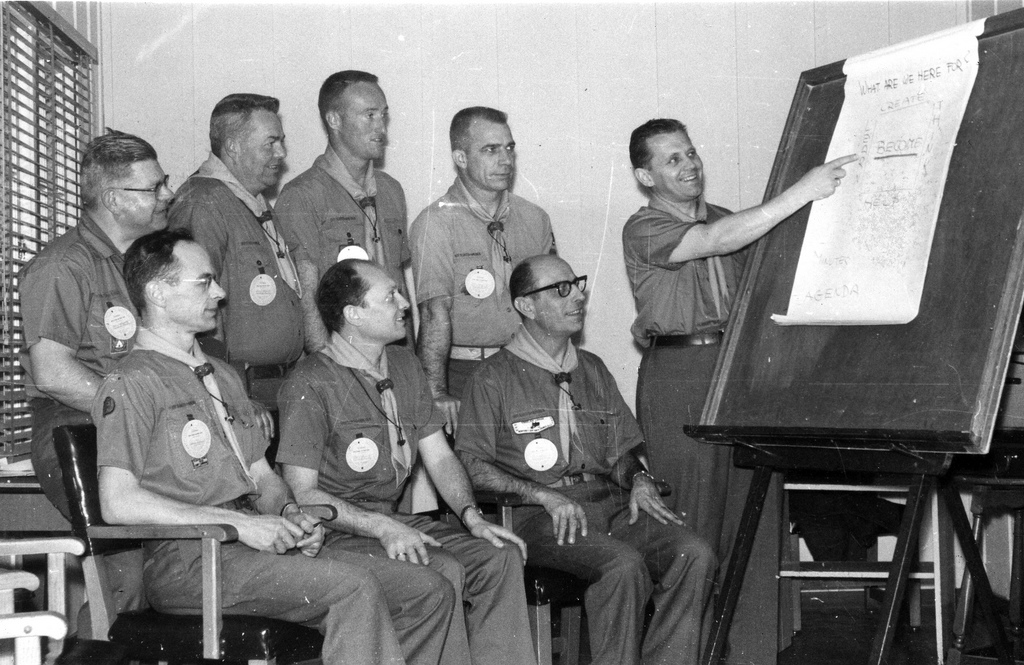
1962 Wood Badge staff meeting on the Monterey Peninsula. Front row, L-R Joe McConnell, Alex Szaszy, Tiz Urbani, Bela Banathy; Back row, L-R Joe St. Clair, William "Bill" Sutcliffe, Bob Bowman, Tom Moore. Flipchart says: "What are we here for? Create, Think, Help, Learn, BECOME"

In February 1966, Brunton appointed seven men to a National task force to lead the effort: Robert L. Calvert, head of the BSA Education Division, was chair of the committee composed of A. Warren Holm, John Larson, William E. Lawrence, Ben H. Love, Kenneth Wells, and Joseph W. Wyckoff. Their plan identified Wood Badge and senior patrol leader training as the best opportunities for providing leadership education within the BSA. Their report recommended that the National Council develop an experimental Wood Badge program as soon as possible to be tested at Mortimer L. Schiff Scout Reservation, to be followed by further testing in selected local councils.^{[a]}

In January 1967, John Larson, along with Bob Perin, Assistant National Director of Volunteer Training, were tasked with working with Dr. Bánáthy to write a new Wood Badge staff guide focusing on the White Stag leadership competencies.

=== Resistance to change ===
Shifting from teaching primarily camping skills to leadership competencies was a paradigm shift. It required rethinking the underlying assumptions, concepts, practices, and values guiding how adults were trained as Scout leaders. Some individuals on the national staff and many volunteers across the nation resisted the idea of changing the focus of Wood Badge from training leaders in Scout craft to leadership skills. Among them was Bill Hillcourt, who had been the first United States Wood Badge Course Director in 1948. He remained loyal to the idea that Wood Badge should teach Scoutcraft skills. Although he had officially retired on August 1, 1965, his opinion was still sought after and respected.

Larson later reported, "He fought us all the way... He had a vested interest in what had been and resisted every change. I just told him to settle down, everything was going to be all right." Hillcourt presented an alternative to Larson's plan to incorporate leadership into Wood Badge. Chief Scout Brunton asked Larson to look at Hillcourt's plan, and Larson reported back that it was the same camping-oriented skills content, just reordered and rewritten. Larson's plan for Wood Badge was approved and he moved ahead to begin testing the proposed changes.

=== Pilot tests conducted ===
In May 1967, participants from six councils met at Mortimer L. Schiff Scout Reservation in New Jersey to train to prepare the new course and follow-on courses. The first laboratory test was during June 1967. Participants from five councils delivered the June course and follow-on council courses. The councils represented were Del-Mar-Va Council in Wilmington, Delaware; Baltimore Area Council in Baltimore, Maryland; Valley Forge Council in Philadelphia, Pennsylvania; Onondaga Council in Syracuse, New York; and the National Capital Area Council in Washington, D.C.

A second experimental course was held at Philmont in New Mexico beginning on June 17, 1967. Bob Perin was Scoutmaster, Louis Adin of the Circle Ten Council in Dallas was senior patrol leader, and John Larson was assistant senior patrol leader. Participants were primarily from the councils who would conduct the next step in laboratory-testing the new program. One month later, on July 18, the Circle Ten Council presented its first new Wood Badge program at Philmont, while Bob Perin and John Larson watched from the sidelines.

In September 1967, after the program was revised, William E. Lawrence, director of the Volunteer Training Service, named six councils who would pilot-test the next phase of the experimental Wood Badge courses during 1968. The councils and Course Directors were: Monterey Bay Area Council, Béla H. Bánáthy; Piedmont Council, Don Crawford; Middle Tennessee Council, Jimmy Stevens; Del-Mar-Va Council, Bill Whisler; Hiawatha Seaway Council, Carson Buck; and the Circle Ten Council, Louis Adin.^{[a]}

=== Leaders and boys both trained ===
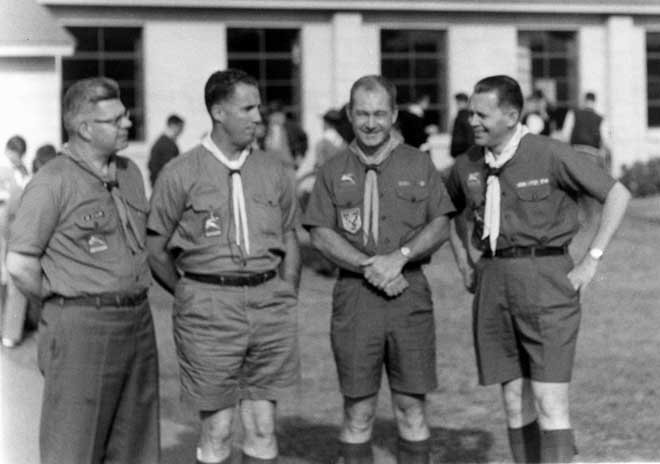
Joe St. Clair, Fran Peterson, Maury Tripp, and Béla H. Bánáthy at the White Stag Leadership Development Program Indaba held at Fort Ord, California, during November 1968. St. Clair, Peterson, and Bánáthy led Course #25-2 over four weekends in January and February 1968 at Fort Ord, one of six experimental Wood Badge courses held nationwide.

In the Monterey Bay Area Council, Bánáthy implemented a unique approach to training both the adults and the boys. During 1967, he recruited a select group of young men and their leaders from troops in the Monterey Bay Area. The individuals were chosen to pilot-test teaching both adult leaders and their Scouts in sequence. In an application not since reproduced, all Wood Badge attendees were also asked to bring their troop to a single week of White Stag summer camp in August.

The leaders attended Wood Badge at Fort Ord, California over four weekends during January and February 1968. Joe St. Clair served as Scoutmaster, Bánáthy was course director, and Fran Petersen was Senior Patrol Leader. John Larson, who had become National Director of Education, was also present. The following August, boys from the troops of the Scoutmasters who attended Wood Badge went to the White Stag Leadership Development Program summer camp. Many of the Wood Badge staff were also present during summer camp so they could follow up on the Wood Badge participant's tickets and their application of the leadership skills learned at Wood Badge. During the summer camp, Larson held a day-long leadership symposium for all of the youth and adults.

=== Experiment includes junior leader training ===
The results were promising and John Larson was appointed Director of Leadership Development. He was charged with continuing support for the experiment. During 1969, Gene Rutherford of the Circle Ten Council along with the Course Directors from the pilot programs—Crawford, Stevens, Whisler and Carl Marlowe of the Hiawatha Councils—were charged with evaluating the project. They continued pilot-testing and experimenting with the program for three more years, through 1972. They also began developing an experimental junior leader training program that utilized the White Stag competencies.

The Boy Scouts also obtained funding that year from the Rockefeller Brothers Fund to evaluate the results of the unique experiment in leadership development by design. The grant underwrote continued testing of the junior leader instructor training program at the Philmont Scout Ranch in New Mexico and the Mortimer L. Schiff Scout Reservation in New Jersey.

They "requested that this program be evaluated by an outside source; hence the Management Analysis Center of Cambridge, Mass., was contracted to make an independent analysis of this experience by interviewing participants, staff members, and parents to determine Scouts' attitudes toward understanding the different aspects of leadership before and after they had completed this program." "In their report, the Management Analysis Center indicated that the educational methods being used in leadership development are consistent with both the current state of knowledge concerning the conditions under which people learn most effectively and within the current practice in the best leadership development programs available to managers in both public and private organizations."

The junior leader training program was developed and named Troop Leader Development when it was published in 1974. In 1991, it was revised and rechristened Troop Leader Training Conference, and then in 1994 Junior Leader Training Conference.^{[a]} It was substantially revised and renamed again in 2004 as National Youth Leadership Training.

=== National pilot-tests begun ===
The Wood Badge course was pilot-tested still further in 1971 at Philmont, the five test councils, and in every national region excepting Region 8.^{[a]} In 1972, after five long years of testing and experimentation, the official new Wood Badge Staff Guide was published. The program was mandated for nationwide implementation and included for the first time teaching leadership skills over Scoutcraft skills.

An experimental Cub Scout Trainer Wood Badge was field tested in 1976. In 1978 the National Council decided in a half-step backwards that Wood Badge needed to place greater emphasis on the practical aspects of good troop operation along with a variety of leadership exercises. Wood Badge was adopted as the official advanced training program for adult Cub Scout Leaders. The modified course blended Scoutcraft skills and troop management practices along with scaled-down content about the leadership competencies.

=== More recent modifications ===
In 1994, the National Council revised the course content again to add key concepts based on Ethics in Action which had been added to Boy Scout training and literature. The leadership competencies remained an essential part of Wood Badge until 1998, when the National Council revised it again to use the unit meeting and a troop camping activity as a delivery model. This new version, re-titled Wood Badge for the 21st Century, was initially revised to include principles of Situational Leadership. However, the Center for Leadership Studies, which owns the trademark for Situational Leadership, required the Boy Scouts to pay royalties for each Scouter attending Wood Badge nationwide. The Wood Badge Task Force decided to describe how groups change and evolve using more generic, non-trademarked language free of royalties. The program emphasized the stages of team development based on the principles described by Bruce Tuckman in 1965 as forming-storming-norming-performing.

On January 1, 2002, the National Council required all councils to implement the updated Wood Badge for the 21st Century program which removed much of the Boy Scout-specific information from the program. This allowed the National Council to designate Wood Badge as the advanced leadership training program for Cub Scout, Boy Scout, Varsity Scout, Venturing, council leaders, district leaders, and professional staff. It replaced both Boy Scout Leader Wood Badge and Cub Scout Trainer Wood Badge. Unlike the prior Wood Badge course which was conducted entirely outdoors, the modified Wood Badge program is delivered through a lecture classroom environment and in a short outdoor camping experience. Participants spend the first three days in a classroom setting, and the last three days camping. Teaching aids include VCRs, laptop computers, and video projectors. Session titles include Leading Change, Problem Solving, Valuing People and Leveraging Diversity, Managing Conflict, and Coaching and Mentoring. At the conclusion of the course, the participants are presented a multimedia presentation titled "Leaving a Legacy." It includes inspirational excerpts from the movie Mr. Holland's Opus and from a John Prine song "Hello in There", sung by Bette Midler. Thus Wood Badge for the 21st Century, at one time based on eleven leadership competencies adapted from White Stag Leadership Development during the 1960s and 1970s, was 30 years later updated, given the 21st century imprint, yet still based on generic group leadership concepts from the 1960s.

=== Centennial Wood Badge ===
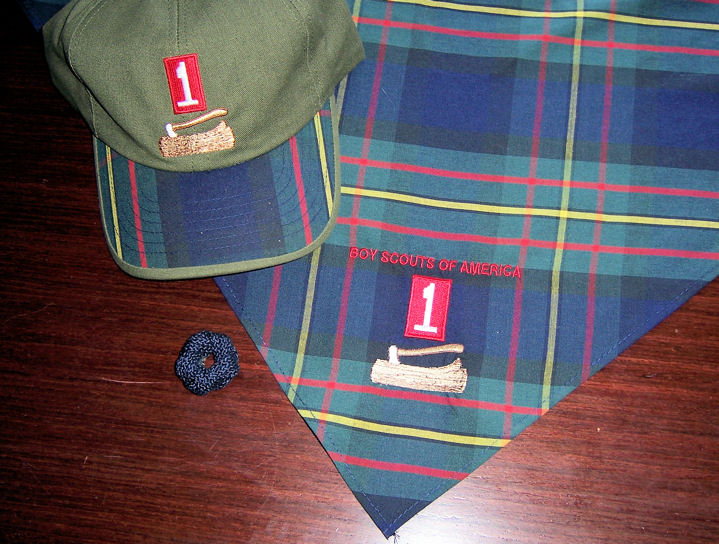
Wood badge regalia

In early 2018, two Wood Badge Centennial Update national pilot courses at Sea Base and Philmont field tested the revised Wood Badge program, due for rollout in Fall 2019 and implementation nationwide in 2020. Later in 2018, eight regional pilots were conducted to further refine Centennial Wood Badge.

Region	Council	Course #	Dates	Location	Course Director
Western	Utah National Parks Council	W2-591-18-4	7/16-7/21	Tifie Scout Camp	Paul Radcliffe
Northeast	Cradle of Liberty Council	N5-525-18-1	8/17-8/19, 9/7-9/9	Musser Scout Reservation	Brenda Conallen
Central	Three Fires Council	C7-127-18-1	8/24-8/26, 9/21-9/23	Camp Big Timber	David George
Central	Blackhawk Area Council	C7-660-18-1	8/24-8/26, 9/21-9/23	Camp Lowden	Kyle Baker
Northeast	Mayflower Council - Cluster	N1-251-18-1	9/15-9/18, 10/26-10/28	Camp Squanto	Laurie Cirignano
Western	Chief Seattle Council	W1-609-18-2	9/28-9/30, 10/12-10/14	Camp Pigott	Bonnie Stafford
Southern	Longhorn Council	S2-662-18-4	10/5-10/7, 10/26-10/28	Sid Richardson Scout Ranch	John Yovanovitch
Southern	Atlanta Area Council	S9-092-18-4	11/8-11/12	Bert Adams SR	Brett DeVore

== Course effectiveness ==
During the 1960s and 1970s, the Boy Scouts spent more than five years studying the White Stag program before implementing a version of the program that included adaptations of the eleven competencies, but excluded the program's symbolism, spirit and traditions. All subsequent revisions have been implemented in two years or less. The actual usefulness and practical effect of Wood Badge training in the United States has never been measured. The Boy Scouts of America wrote in its A History of Wood Badge in the United States that:

It should be stated at the start that there is no objective evidence that Wood Badge improved leadership in Scouting. The Boy Scouts of America has never undertaken to statistically validate the impact of Wood Badge by conducting before and after tests, or by comparing Wood Badge Scouters with Scouters who are not Wood Badge trained.^{[a]}
