= William Hillcourt =

American scouting leader (1900–1992)

- Hillcourt (Left) and Lord Robert Baden-Powell (Right), at Hillcourt Cottage, Schiff Scout Reservation, on July 15, 1935
- Born: Vilhelm Hans Bjerregaard Jensen; August 6, 1900; Aarhus, Denmark
- Died: November 9, 1992 (aged 92); Stockholm, Sweden
- Resting place: St. Joseph's Cemetery, Mendham, New Jersey, United States
- Occupation: Scouter
- Employer: Boy Scouts of America
- Known for: First U.S. Wood Badge course director, author including Boy Scout Handbook, Boy Scout Fieldbook, Patrol Leaders Handbook, and articles for Boys' Life and Scouting magazines.
- Spouse: Grace Brown
- Awards: Knight-Scout, Denmark (1918); Distinguished Eagle Scout Award (1978); Silver Buffalo Award (1980); Bronze Wolf Award (1985)

Signature
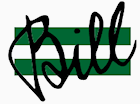

William Hillcourt (born Vilhelm Hans Bjerregaard Jensen; August 6, 1900 – November 9, 1992), was a Danish-American scouting leader. Known within the Scouting movement as "Green Bar Bill", he was an influential leader in the Boy Scouts of America (BSA) organization from 1927 to 1992. Hillcourt was a prolific writer and teacher in the areas of woodcraft, troop and patrol structure, and training; his written works include three editions of the BSA's official Boy Scout Handbook, with over 12.6 million copies printed, other Scouting-related books and numerous magazine articles. Hillcourt developed and promoted the American adaptation of the Wood Badge adult Scout leader training program.

Hillcourt was Danish-born and moved to the United States as a young adult. From his start in Danish Scouting in 1910 until his death in 1992, he was continuously active in Scouting. He traveled all over the world teaching and training both Scouts and Scouters, earning many of Scouting's highest honors. His legacy and influence can still be seen today in the BSA program and in Scouting training manuals and methods for both youth and adults.

== Personal life ==
Hillcourt was born in 1900 in Aarhus, Denmark, and was the youngest of three sons of a building contractor. He was given the name Vilhelm Hans Bjerregaard Jensen. Around 1930, he changed his name by anglicizing "Vilhelm", translating "Bjerregaard" into "Hill-court" and dropping "Jensen". His first published work was a poem about trolls and elves, printed by an Aarhus newspaper when he was nine years old. For Christmas 1910, Hillcourt's brother gave him a Danish translation of Scouting for Boys by Baden-Powell, the founder of the Scout movement. He went on to earn the highest award in Danish Scouting, Knight-Scout in 1918, at age 17. He was selected to represent his troop at the 1st World Scout Jamboree in Olympia in 1920 where he first met Baden-Powell, with whom he was later to work.

While Hillcourt studied pharmacy in Copenhagen, he became more involved in Scouting. As a Scout leader, he became a Scoutmaster, national instructor, writer and then the editor for the Danish Scouting journal. He wrote his first book, The Island, recounting his early Scouting experiences.

After deciding to experience Scouting around the world and to return home with the best ideas, Hillcourt worked his way through Europe and England and then arrived in the United States in February 1926. He was soon hired by the BSA's national office and worked for the BSA until he retired as a professional Scouter in 1965. In 1933 Hillcourt married Grace Brown, the personal secretary of Chief Scout Executive James E. West.

== Scouting career ==
Hillcourt worked at a BSA camp at Bear Mountain in Harriman State Park, New York, in 1926 where he became an instructor in American Indian dance. He then worked for the BSA Supply Division where he broke his leg when a crate fell on him. He met James West while riding in an elevator at the national office. West solicited Hillcourt's thoughts on Scouting in the U.S. Hillcourt later sent West an 18-page memo detailing issues with the lack of patrol structure and leadership. He recommended that the BSA write a handbook for patrol leaders, and that it needed to be written by someone who had been both a patrol leader and a Scoutmaster. West hired Hillcourt as a writer and editor and was later persuaded to commission Hillcourt to write the first Handbook for Patrol Leaders which was published in 1929.

Hillcourt with a totem pole, made by Ernest Thompson Seton, on his lawn, featured in an 85th birthday tribute in the magazine Scouting

From 1932 until his retirement in 1965, Hillcourt was a major contributor to Boys' Life, the magazine for Scouting youth. Each monthly issue included a page on advancement and Scoutcraft, outdoor Scouting skills, and included his signature superimposed over the two green bars that are the emblem of the patrol leader, which led to his moniker "Green Bar Bill" and its adoption as the logo of his regular Boys' Life column.

Hillcourt was tasked to write a new manual for Scoutmasters in 1934 and worked with his good friend and colleague E. Urner Goodman, the national program director of the BSA. He and his wife moved to a house in Mendham Borough, New Jersey, to be near Schiff Scout Reservation, the BSA's national training center, so he could be in place to put his theories to a practical test. In order to do so, he founded Troop 1 of Mendham in 1935 as a unit directly chartered to the National Council of the BSA. As the Scoutmaster, he used Troop 1 to test and validate his work for 16 years.

The Baden-Powells visited Schiff in 1935 and began a steadfast friendship with the Hillcourts. Baden-Powell died in 1941. After World War II, Baden-Powell's widow, Olave Baden-Powell, allowed Hillcourt to edit Aids to Scoutmastership into the World Brotherhood Editions to help the Scouting movement recover from the war. She then allowed Hillcourt access to Baden-Powell's letters, diaries and sketchbooks when she and Hillcourt co-authored the narrative biography of Baden-Powell, Baden-Powell: The Two Lives of a Hero.

The BSA national office moved from New York City to North Brunswick, New Jersey, in 1954, and the Hillcourts moved with it. He completed the sixth edition of the Boy Scout Handbook in time for the BSA's 50th anniversary in 1960.

=== Wood Badge ===
To encourage the creation of Rovering in the U.S., J. S. Wilson travelled from the UK to oversee a Wood Badge course in May 1936 at Schiff. Hillcourt was a participant in that first course and four days later, he was the senior patrol leader for the second course. He received his Wood Badge beads in 1939 and was appointed as the deputy camp director for Wood Badge. After World War II, Wood Badge was revived and Hillcourt was the Scoutmaster for a test course begun on July 31, 1948, at Schiff and the first standard course at Philmont Scout Ranch. As the national director of training, Hillcourt wore five Wood Badge beads, a tradition that has been discontinued in the U.K. Scout Association, however other countries still continue the use of the five Wood Badge Beads and are still worn by the National Volunteer Leader of Wood Badge Training of each country as well as by special decree of Gilwell Park today.

== Later life ==
Hillcourt later in life

Hillcourt retired from the BSA on August 1, 1965. In 1971, he and Grace finally completed the world tour he had started in 1926; along the way they attended the 13th World Scout Jamboree in Fujinomiya, Japan. Grace Hillcourt died in 1973. Rather than live alone, Bill moved into the home of his good friends Carson and Martha Buck.

The BSA had introduced the "Improved Scouting Program" in 1972, along with a new edition of the Boy Scout Handbook. Many of the changes were intended to expand Scouting to a broader base of youth and to make Scouting more "in tune with the times". Many Scouters, including Hillcourt, were critical of the new program changes, exclaiming that the de-emphasis on traditional outdoor skills had taken the "outing out of Scouting". This change proved to be unsuccessful, deterring existing adherents and attracting relatively few new enrolments. To remedy this situation, Hillcourt convinced Chief Scout Executive Harvey L. Price that a new handbook was needed. Hillcourt then came out of retirement and spent a year writing and editing the 1979 edition of The Official Boy Scout Handbook, returning to the focus of Scoutcraft. In addition, he helped to develop the All Out for Scouting program that launched the return to the old standards. Hillcourt was regarded as a prominent figure and guide in BSA's recovery from its experiment earlier in that decade.

Hillcourt was recognized for his service to youth by the BSA with the Distinguished Eagle Scout Award on May 19, 1978. (Note: When or if Hillcourt earned the Eagle Scout Award is uncertain. The official BSA DESA list shows that Hillcourt earned Eagle Scout in 1918—the year he earned Knight-Scout in Denmark—but he did not arrive in the U.S. until 1926.) In 1980, the BSA presented Hillcourt with their highest national honor, the Silver Buffalo Award and he was cited as "The Voice of Scouting". The World Scout Committee of the World Organization of the Scout Movement recognized him for exceptional services to world Scouting in 1985 with the Bronze Wolf Award. In the same year, an article in the Scouting magazine proclaimed Hillcourt as "the foremost influence on development of the Boy Scouting program."

In the last 12 months of 1985, he traveled to Dallas, Washington, Knoxville, Houston, San Francisco, Cleveland, Los Angeles, and other cities. He also attended the World Conference held for the first time in Germany, an inter-American scout conference in Brazil (with side trips to Argentina and Paraguay). He served as scoutmaster in the Wood Badge program for "South Explorers Leaders and Center –Leadership Course in Troop", He ended his trip to South America in Caracas, Venezuela. He also was Troop Head and Director of the Field-School "Paramacay".

To celebrate during the month of August his 85 years of age with his old friends explorers in Copenhagen, Denmark. And then, of course, in the middle of the times, he continued to camp in the different events that took place during his campaign and did not fail to make a presence with his uninterrupted record, with the Jamboree. In 1990 he also became a member of Firecrafter, an American Scouting service organization. Travel and appearances at Scouting events both local and worldwide were part of his routine until he died, for which he was referred to as Scoutmaster to the World.

Hillcourt died at the age of 92, in Stockholm, Sweden, while traveling on a Scouting tour with Carson Buck on November 9, 1992. He is buried with his wife Grace in St. Joseph's Cemetery (Row 8, Block I) in Mendham Borough, New Jersey, United States. The grave lies within the geographic scope of the Patriots Path Council near Schiff Scout Reservation at coordinates 40.7755°N 74.6024°W, where he lived for many years. His legacy in Scouting and his influence continue in the programs and training of Scouting. His writings are still used within the Scouting movement and his material continues to be reprinted in Scouting magazine. The Longhouse Council operates the William Hillcourt Scout Museum and Carson Buck Memorial Library at Camp Woodland in New York to "keep the traditions of Scouting alive" through the preservation of the history that is a foundation for today's Scouting movement.

== Works ==
Hillcourt was one of the BSA's most prolific writers. He wrote numerous articles for Boys' Life and Scouting magazines, including a column aimed at patrol leaders under the by-line of "Patrol Leader Green Bar Bill". At least 12,610,000 copies of his three editions of the Boy Scout Handbook were printed.

- (1925) The Island
- (1929) Handbook for Patrol Leaders
- (1933) The 1933 Scout Jamboree Book with James E. West
- (1936) Handbook for Scoutmasters, Third edition in two volumes
- (1946) Aids to Scoutmastership, World Brotherhood Edition, by Baden-Powell, revised by Hillcourt
- (1946) Scouting for Boys, World Brotherhood Edition, by Baden-Powell, revised by Hillcourt
- (1948) Scout Fieldbook, First edition, with West
- (1950) Handbook for Patrol Leaders; World Brotherhood Edition
- (1959) Boy Scout Handbook, Sixth edition
- (1961) Field Book of Nature Activities and Conservation: An Indispensable Guide for Nature Lovers
- (1964) Baden-Powell: The Two Lives of a Hero; biography of Baden-Powell
- (1965) Boy Scout Handbook, Seventh edition
- (1967) Handbook for Patrol Leaders, Second edition (heavily edited revision)
- (1967) Physical Fitness for Boys
- (1967) Physical Fitness for Girls
- (1968) Your Guide to Fitness
- (1970) New Field Book of Nature Activities & Hobbies
- (1970) Fun With Nature Hobbies
- (1971) The Golden Book of Camping
- (1975) Outdoor Things To Do: Year-round Nature Fun for Girls and Boys
- (1977) Norman Rockwell's World of Scouting; biography of iconic illustrator Norman Rockwell
- (1979) The Official Boy Scout Handbook, Ninth edition
- (1980) The Official Patrol Leader Handbook, Third edition

== See also ==
- Scouting memorials
