= Scouting in Mississippi =

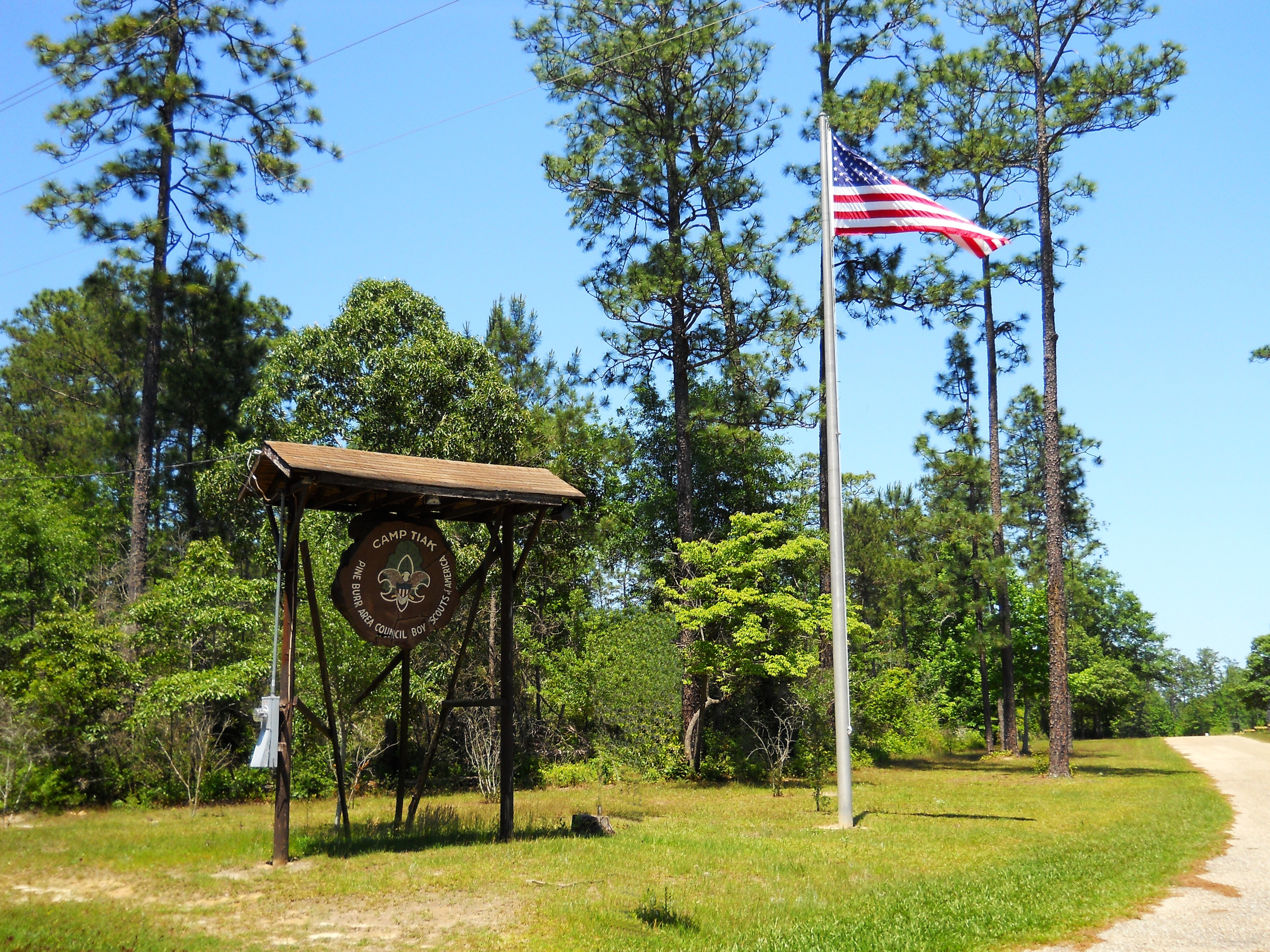
- Camp Tiak Sign

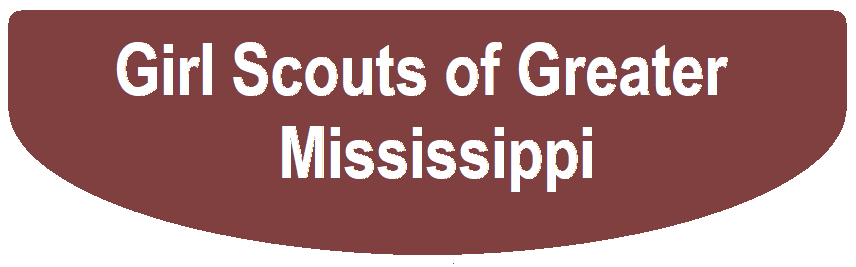
- Girl Scouts of Greater Mississippi

Scouting in Mississippi has a long history, from the 1910s to the present day, serving thousands of youth in programs that suit the environment in which they live.

== Early history (1910-1950) ==
In 1909, Dr. Cran, the Local Episcopal Minister, and Mr. C.H. Hamilton organized Troop 19 in Brookhaven, Mississippi. In 1910, the unit was officially recognized by the local scout office in Vicksburg. Troop 19 became Troop 119 after the Andrew Jackson Council was formed. It was sponsored by the First Presbyterian Church until 1938/39 when it was then sponsored by "The Men's Bible Class" First United Methodist church where it has remained. The Troop has been continuously chartered since 1910 and is as old as the incorporated Boy Scouts of America.

In 1912, one year after the Boy Scout movement came from England to the United States, George F. Maynard Sr. founded the first troop in Tupelo — Troop 1. Scout units were soon founded in other cities such as Picayune, Corinth and Oxford.

The Yazoo County Council was founded in 1919, and closed in 1922. The Southwest Mississippi Council (#303) was founded in 1923, and closed in 1928. The South Mississippi Area Council (#705) was founded in 1925, and closed in 1928. The Meridian Council (#302) was founded in 1920, and in 1935 changed its name to the Choctaw Area Council (#302).

The Pine Burr-Hattiesburg Area Council (#304) was founded in 1927, changing its name to the Pine Burr Area Council (#304) in 1935. The East Mississippi Area Council (#691) was founded in 1926, changing its name to the Pushmataha Area Council (#691) in 1936. The Yocona Area Council (#748) was founded in 1926.

The Jackson Council (#301) was founded in 1918, changing its name to the Hinds and Rankin Counties Council (#301) in 1922. The Vicksburg Council (#304) was founded in 1919. The Hinds and Rankin Counties and Vicksburg councils merged to become the Kickapoo Area Council (#301) in 1927. In 1930, the Andrew Jackson Area Council (#303) was merged, and it merged with the Kickapoo Area Council (#301) in 1937 to become the Andrew Jackson Council (#303).

== Recent history (1950-1990) ==
Scouting has continued to thrive in Mississippi. There are eight Boy Scout councils and two Girl Scout councils that serve the state.

== Scouting in Mississippi today ==
There are eight Boy Scouts of America (BSA) local councils that serve Mississippi.

=== Andrew Jackson Council ===
Andrew Jackson Council (#303)
- Andrew Jackson Council CSP
- Owner: Scouting America
- Headquarters: Jackson, MS
- Country: United States
- Website bsa-jackson.org

The Andrew Jackson Council serves Scouts in the area surrounding the state capital.

=== History ===
The Jackson Council (#301) was founded in 1918, changing its name to the Hinds and Rankin Counties Council (#301) in 1922. The Vicksburg Council (#304) was founded in 1919. The Hinds and Rankin Counties and Vicksburg councils merged to become the Kickapoo Area Council (#301) in 1927. In 1930, the Andrew Jackson Area Council (#303) was merged, and it merged with the Kickapoo Area Council (#301) in 1937 to become the Andrew Jackson Council (#303).

=== Organization ===
The council has five districts:

- Natchez Trace District: Adams, Amite, Claiborne, Franklin, and Jefferson Counties
- Big Creek District: Copiah, Lawrence, Lincoln, Pike, and Walthall Counties
- Strong River District: Scott, Rankin and Simpson Counties
- Four Rivers District: Hinds, Issquena, Sharkey, and Warren Counties
- North Trace District: Attala, Holmes, Leake, Madison and Yazoo Counties

=== Camps ===
- Hood Scout Reservation

=== Order of the Arrow ===
- Sebooney Okasucca Lodge

=== Chickasaw Council ===
Chickasaw Council (#558)
- Headquarters: Memphis, Tennessee
- Website www.chickasaw.org

The Chickasaw Council serves Scouts in Tennessee and Arkansas, as well as Mississippi. The Delta Area Council of west Mississippi and their Koi Hatachie lodge 345, Order of the Arrow, merged into Chickasaw Council in the early 1990s.

=== Choctaw Area Council ===
Choctaw Area Council (#302)
- Choctaw Area Council CSP
- Owner: Scouting America
- Headquarters: Meridian, MS
- Country: United States
- Website; Choctaw Area Council

The Choctaw Area Council serves youth in east Mississippi and west Alabama, with the council office located in Meridian, Mississippi. The Choctaw Area Council camp is Camp Binachi.

=== History ===
The Meridian Council (#302) was founded in 1920, and in 1935 changed its name to the Choctaw Area Council (#302).

=== Organization ===
- Bobashela District
- Seminole District

=== Order of the Arrow ===
- Ashwanchi Kinta Lodge

=== Istrouma Area Council ===
Istrouma Area Council (#211)
- Headquarters: Baton Rouge, Louisiana
- Website www.iacbsa.org

The Istrouma Area Council serves Scouts in Louisiana and Mississippi.

=== Pine Burr Area Council ===
Pine Burr Area Council (#303)
- Pine Burr Area Council CSP
- Owner: Boy Scouts of America
- Headquarters: Hattiesburg, Mississippi
- Country: United States
- Website; Pine Burr Area Council

The Pine Burr Area Council serves youth in 17 counties in southeast and southern Mississippi, from headquarters in Hattiesburg.

=== History ===
The Pine Burr-Hattiesburg Area Council (#304) was founded in 1927, changing its name to the Pine Burr Area Council (#304) in 1935.

==== Organization ====
- Singing River District
- Spanish Trail District
- Tall Pine District
- Tung Belt District
- Twin Rivers District
- Chickasawhay District

Scoutreach Division

==== Camps ====
- Camp Tiak

=== Pushmataha Area Council ===
Pushmataha Area Council (#691)
- Headquarters: Columbus, Mississippi
- Website www.pushmataha.org

Pushmataha Area Council serves Calhoun, Chickasaw, Monroe, Webster, Oktibbeha, Clay, Lowndes, Winston, Choctaw and Noxubee counties in north Mississippi. Camp Seminole is the Pushmataha Area Council camp. Pushmataha Area Council merged and is now part of Natchez Trace Council.

=== Southeast Louisiana Council ===
The Southeast Louisiana Council serves Scouting in Assumption, Jefferson, Lafourche, Orleans, Plaquemine, Saint John the Baptist, Saint Bernard, Saint Charles, Saint James, Saint Tammany, and Terrebonne Parishes in Louisiana. The 1,200 acres (4.9 km^{2}) camp property known as Salmen Scout Reservation is located in Kiln, Mississippi.

=== Yocona Area Council ===
Yocona Area Council (#748)
- Headquarters: Tupelo, Mississippi
- Website www.yocona.org

The Yocona Area Council of northeast Mississippi is headquartered in Tupelo. It serves Alcorn, Tishomingo, Prentiss, Itawamba, Lee, Pontotoc, Tippah, Union, Benton, Marshall, Lafayette, and Yalobusha counties. The Chicksa Lodge serves local Arrowmen. Yocona Area Council merged and is now part of Natchez Trace Council.

== Girl Scouting in Mississippi ==
Girl Scouting in Mississippi
- Map of Girl Scout Council in Mississippi

There are two Girl Scout councils in Mississippi.

=== Girl Scouts of Greater Mississippi ===
Girl Scouts of Greater Mississippi serves some 10,000 members in 45 counties of south and central Mississippi.

It was formed by the merger of Girl Scouts of Gulf Pines Council and Girl Scout Council of Middle Mississippi in 2009.

Headquarters
Jackson, Mississippi
Website: gsgms.org

Service centers

- Hattiesburg
- Gulfport
- Meridian

Camps

- Camp Iti Kana is 339 acres (137.2 ha) including a 55 acres (22 ha) lake near Wiggins. Its name is from the Choctaw language and means friendship.
- Camp Wahi is 150 acres (61 ha) in Brandon, MS

=== Girl Scouts Heart of the South ===
See Scouting in Tennessee for full information. In Mississippi serves girls in northern counties.

Headquarters
Memphis, Tennessee
Website: www.girlscoutshs.org

Mississippi service centers

- Tupelo, Mississippi

Mississippi camps

- Camp Tik-A-Witha is 310 acres (125.5 ha) (including a 20 acres (8.1 ha) lake) of woods and sand dunes near Van Vleet, MS

== See also ==
- Camp Fire
