= National Youth Leadership Training =

Scouting America youth training program

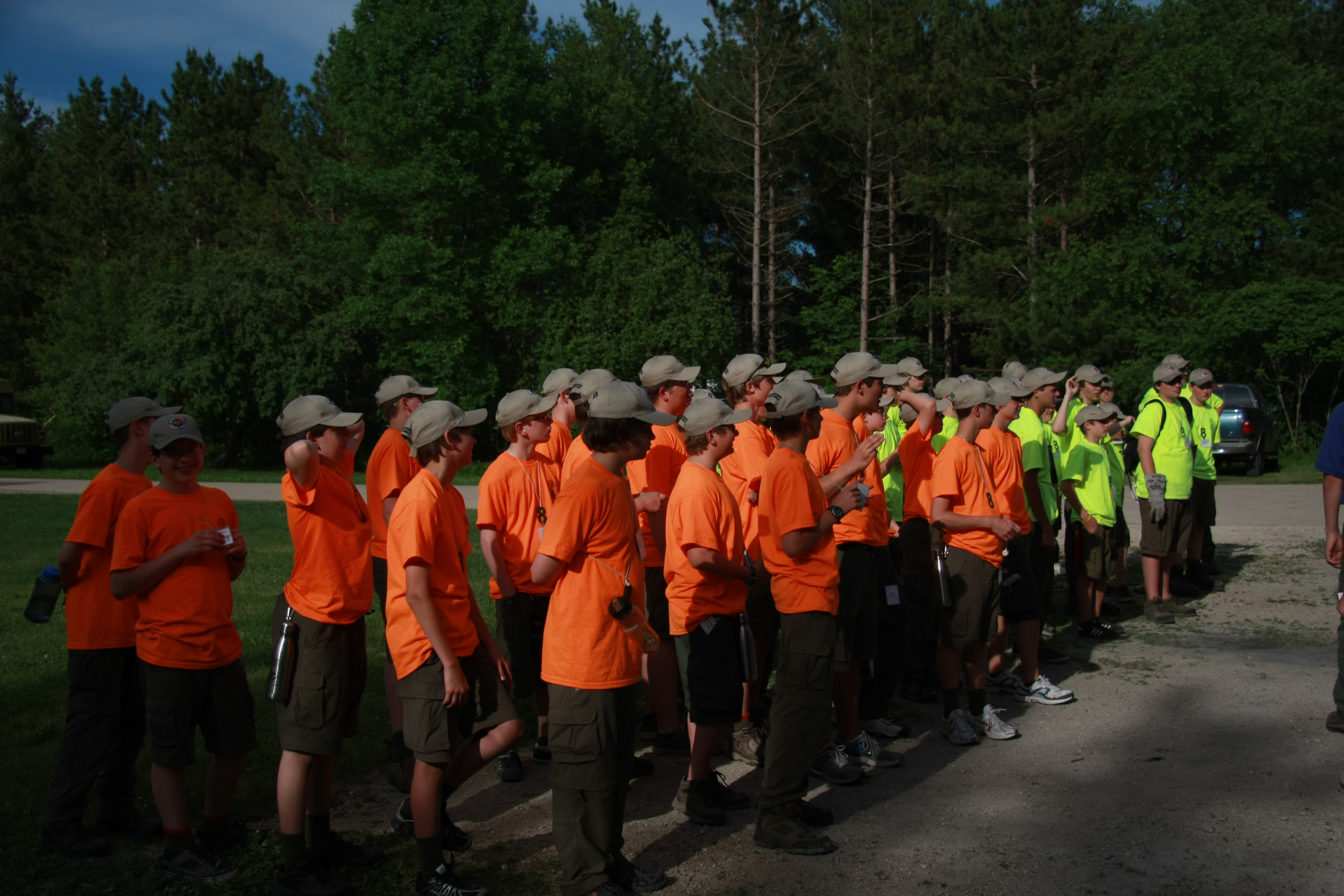
- Patrols gather
- Owner: Scouting America
- Country: United States
- Founded: 2003

National Youth Leadership Training (NYLT) is the current youth leadership training offered by Scouting America. It is conducted at the council level for members of the Scouts BSA, Venturing, and Sea Scout programs, which are open to youth of all genders. NYLT is part of the national organization's leadership training program and is similar to Woodbadge, which is Scouting America's program for adult leadership training. Instead of Adult Leaders conducting the training, the course is operated by youth staff, and adults serve as advisors.

== History ==
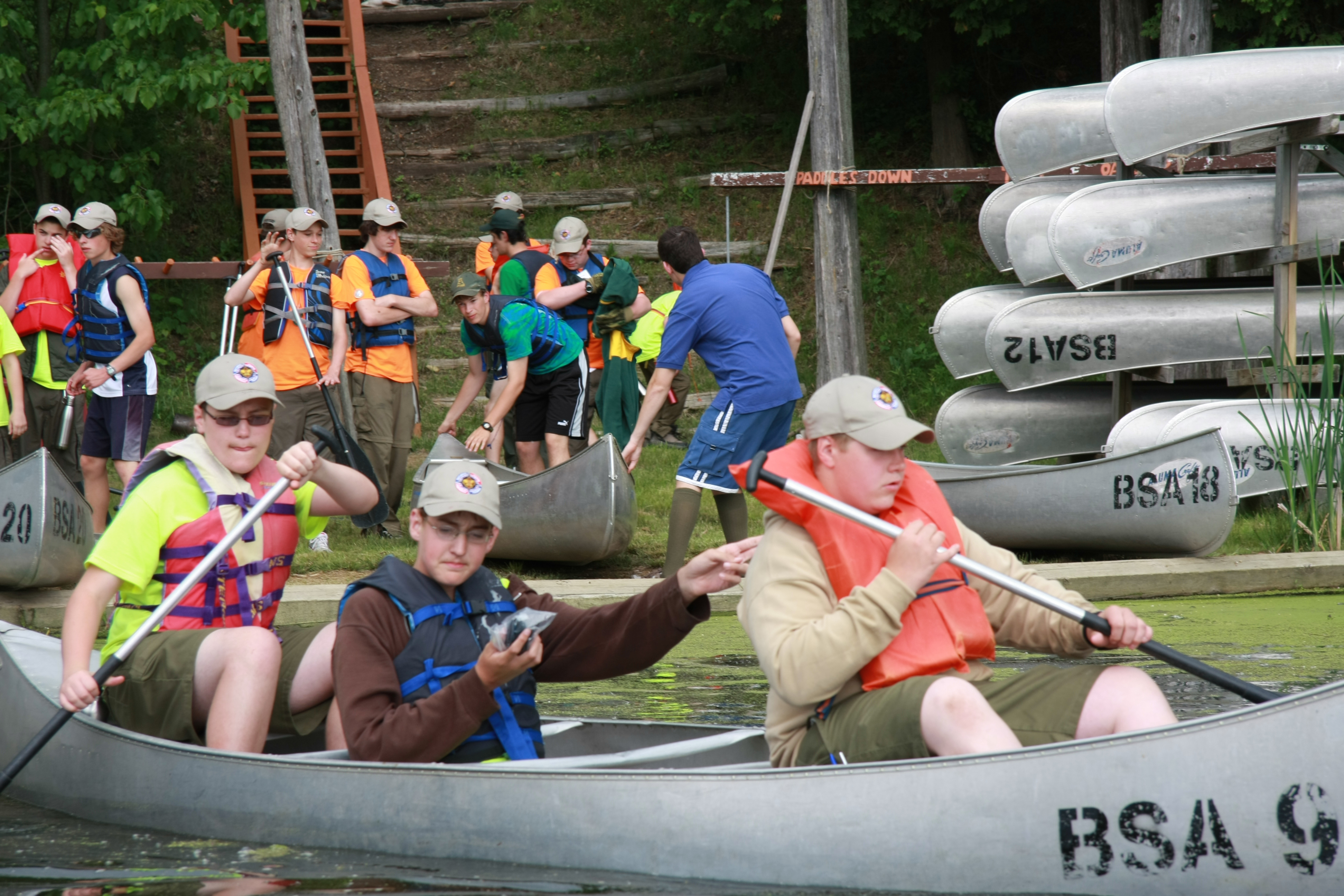
Participants set off on an excursion at Camp Long Lake

In 1949 Scouts from 24 councils in 16 states formed a Junior Leader Training Troop at Philmont Scout Ranch for a forty-day training program in leadership and Scoutcraft. In 1950 the "Junior Leaders' Training Course was developed to give intensive training in Scouting skills and techniques to select Explorers. Each is trained with the end in view that he in turn will train other junior leaders. The course has four parts. The first is centered around studying leadership methods, organization, patrol method, Explorer crews, troop meetings, and camping skills. The second part deals with teaching the same skills. The third sees the trainees actually living the patrol method, using the Scouting skills. The fourth part is devoted to a model junior leaders’ conference, and projects in nature lore, special Scoutcraft skills, emergency service, and personal and group service.” In 1952 at Philmont Scout Ranch 270 participants and at Schiff Scout Reservation 436 participants completed junior leader training camps. At Schiff the program lasted for twelve days, a practice that continued until 1972. In 1974 the Boy Scouts of America published the Troop Leadership Development Staff Guide.

In the 1980s and 1990s, the curriculum was called Junior Leader Training (JLT). Building upon the base of JLT, in 2003 and 2004, NYLT was piloted across the country and rolled out in 2005.

In 2009 the practice of adding names like Pine Tree and Golden Acorn to the program was supposed to end. Some councils ignore that policy and use Grey Wolf NYLT, Top Gun National Youth Leadership Training, Silver Bear NYLT, Golden Falcon NYLT, Timberline NYLT, and Brownsea NYLT. In 2010, Boy Scout and Venturing youth leadership training merged and the curriculum language was modified to reflect the combined nature of the program.

== Program ==
Participants are organized in teams of no more than eight, mirroring a typical local patrol and troop. A staff member, called a troop guide, is assigned to each patrol (a team) to coach, mentor, and present some sessions and activities, much as a den chief would in a den of a pack. During the training the senior patrol leader performs the same function for the training cohort as a senior patrol leader does for a troop: running meetings and events, delegating responsibilities, assisting Scoutmasters, modeling learning, displaying leadership, and recruiting participation. In addition to generally assisting the senior patrol leader, the assistant senior patrol leader(s) are expected to oversee audiovisual support, guide the service patrol, inspect campsites, and prepare a model campsite. Some participants find the combination of technology and outdoor education problematic. Administrative services and rule compliance are left to the adult supervision. The training is presented either in a one-week format or can be split over two or three weekends. The program is often conducted at resident camps.

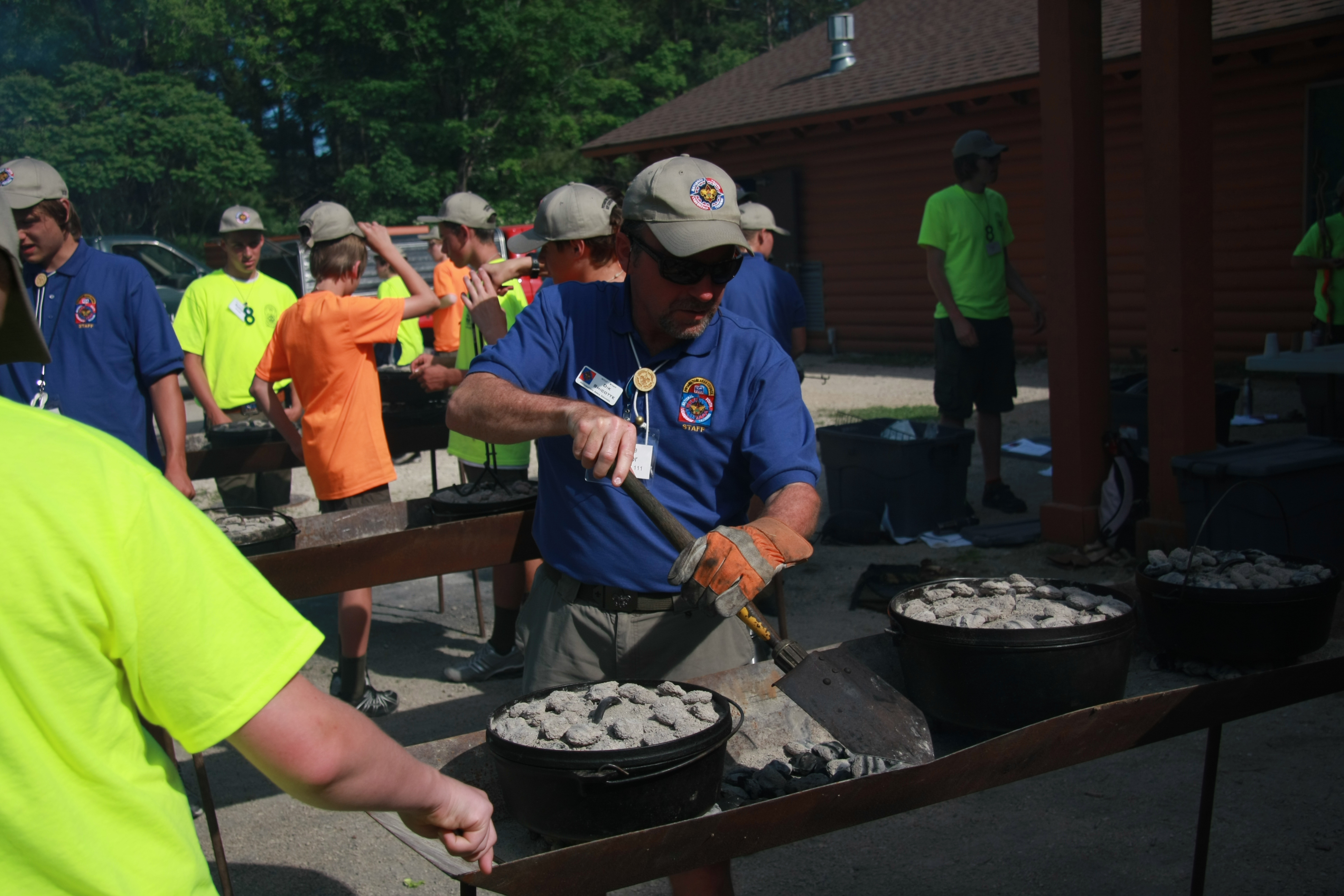
Participants use Dutch ovens

The vast majority of the curriclum includes skills instruction on topics to include: Communication & Speaking, Planning, Goal Setting, Team Development, Problem Solving, Relisience, Diversity, and Ethics. All topics a presented are presented in a classroom or group format often followed by an activity that reinforces the concepts. Most of the topics are taught by other youth that have taken the course and been invited back to staff, with more sensitive topics such as Ethics and Diversity being taught by adults in the program. The curriculum is structured so that as the course progresses each topic eventually builds on those previously delivered.

The EDGE model is included in the NYLT programme, the EDGE model is used by Scoutmaster, an assistant Scoutmaster, or an experienced youth knowledgeable in EDGE to be taught to the troop. The steps are:

- Explain — "The trainer explains how something is done."
- Demonstrate — "The trainer demonstrates while explaining again."
- Guide — "The learner tries the skill while the trainer guides him through it."
- Enable — "The learner works on his own under the eye of the trainer."

Program objectives include developing confidence, knowledge, leadership, teaching, motivation, team working, sharing ideas, sharing experiences, strengthening relationships between youth and adults, fellowship, and fun. Many of the key course concepts are represented as mnemonics including planning and problem-solving tools that focus on where, what, how, when, and who (5WH); the start, stop, continue method of assessing progress; forming, storming, norming, performing often labeled the stages of team development; explain, demonstrate, guide, and enable or EDGE method (consult pages 38–39 in the 13th and 14th editions of the Scouts BSA Handbook which describes the Teaching EDGE method); express, address, and resolve or EAR conflict resolution tool; right vs. wrong, right vs. right, and trivial ethical decision making; message, sender, and receiver communication; and reach out, organize, practice, and experience or ROPE approach to human value.

== National Advanced Youth Leadership Experience ==
National Advanced Youth Leadership Experience
- Owner: Scouting America
- Country: United States
- Founded: 2006
- Website www.scouting.org/programs/scouts-bsa/resources/nayle/

National Advanced Youth Leadership Experience (NAYLE) is a youth leadership training program of Scouting America. The format is a week-long, leadership development experience, providing young men and women aged 14 through 20 the environment to enhance their leadership skills.

=== Program content ===
NAYLE originated at the Philmont Training Center (PTC) as National Junior Leader Instructor Camp (NJLIC) which was replaced by the National Youth Leader Instructor Camp (NYLIC) before its current form. The one-week youth leadership training program of scouting America expands onteam-building and ethical decision-making skills learned in National Youth Leadership Training (NYLT) and was created for young men and women aged 14 through 20.

As of 2018, the program is based at two of Scouting America's four national high adventure bases:

- Philmont Scout Ranch (Rayado Ridge Leadership Camp, part of Philmont Training Center)
- Summit Bechtel Reserve (SBR)
