= Scouts BSA Handbook =

Official handbook of Scouts BSA

- Cover of the 14th edition
- Author: Scouting America
- Language: English
- Publication date: 1910, 1st edition 2019, 14th edition
- Publication place: United States
- ISBN: 978-0-8395-3102-9
- OCLC: 302189421
- Dewey Decimal: 369.43 22
- LC Class: HS3313 .B69 2009
- Text: Scouts BSA Handbook at Wikisource

Scouts BSA Handbook is the official handbook of Scouts BSA, published by Scouting America. It is a descendant publication of Baden-Powell's original handbook, Scouting for Boys, which has been the basis for Scout handbooks in many countries, with some variations to the text of the book depending on each country's codes and customs.

The handbook opens by introducing the Scout Oath, the Scout Law, the Scout Motto, and the Scout Slogan. There are currently three editions of the Scouts BSA Handbook, one for girls, one for boys, and one unified handbook, but other than photographs, the content is essentially the same.

The original edition of the handbook was based on Baden-Powell's work. Ernest Thompson Seton combined his Woodcraft manual, the Birch Bark Rolls, with Baden-Powell's Scouting for Boys. Subsequent works were done by other authors. William "Green Bar Bill" Hillcourt wrote the 6th, 7th, and 9th editions. Frederick L. Hines wrote the 8th, and Robert Birkby the 10th, 11th and 12th editions.

== Purpose of the Handbook ==
Since its first edition, the Boy Scout Handbook was published to be the primary reference for Scouts. It was used by Scouts at a time when the internet was not available and included practical information a Scout needed. It also was designed as a moral compass. It was and still is brought out of the classroom and into the field including on camping outings. Many copies did not survive these years of use in harsh environments and very few early examples have survived to this day in good conditions.

== Editions ==
=== 1910 Original Edition Handbook ===
The first Official Handbook, subtitled A Handbook of Woodcraft, Scouting, and Life-craft was published from July 1910 until March 1911 and appeared in eight distinct variations. It was written by Ernest Seton and drew greatly on Baden-Powell's Scouting for Boys, it included information on the organization of Scouting, signs and signaling, and camping, as well as Scouting games and a description of several Scouting honours. Notably, this book did not place emphasis on first aid, knife and axe use, or map and compass work, as later editions would. Because this edition was intended solely as a temporary guide until an authoritative handbook could be made, it is now known as the 1910 Original Edition Handbook. The cover art was an illustration by Baden-Powell. There were about 28,000 copies printed, not 68,900 as previously thought.

=== First Edition ===
The Official Handbook for Boys was published in June 1911. In this edition, the American Scouting program was standardized, albeit with many omissions and mistakes (cf. external links). As with the Original Edition, many now-standard Scouting skills were passed over, including knife and axe use and map and compass work.

The book describes many Scout-like virtues and qualifications. After a lengthy section on what a Scout should know, including chivalry, history, and national issues, it is noted that "in short, to be a good Scout is to be a well-developed, well-informed boy."

On June 17, 2005, a re-print of the First Edition was published by Dover Publications. The book contains all the original material in 448 pages.

=== Scouts BSA ===
The Boy Scouting program began admitting girls in 2019 and was renamed Scouts BSA. The handbook was renamed the Scouts BSA Handbook for the 14th edition. It is available in two editions with identical content but one with photos of boys and one of girls. The board of directors wanted to make sure that male and female scouts alike would see themselves within the pages of the Handbook. The text however is identical in both version including the requirements and program elements remaining unchanged from the 13th edition. The boys' version has a green with lettering and First Class Rank Emblem in metallic gold cover, while the girls' version is tan with the same lettering and First Class Rank Emblem in metallic green cover.

=== All Editions ===
Dates and names of the various editions are:

- The Official Handbook for Boys: A Handbook of Woodcraft, Scouting, and Life-craft (1st ed.). 1910–1911.
- The Official Handbook for Boys (2nd ed.). 1914–1927.
- The Official Handbook for Boys (Every Boy's Library (Boy Scouts of America Edition) ed.). 1914–1927.
- Revised Handbook for Boys (3rd ed.). 1927–1940.
- Revised Handbook for Boys (4th ed.). 1940–1948.
- Handbook for Boys (5th ed.). 1948–1959.
- Boy Scout Handbook (6th ed.). 1959–1965.
- Boy Scout Handbook (7th ed.). 1965–1972.
- Scout Handbook (8th ed.). 1972–1979.
- Official Boy Scout Handbook (9th ed.). 1979–1990.
- Boy Scout Handbook (10th ed.). 1990–1998.
- Boy Scout Handbook (11th ed.). 1998–2009.
  - Boy Scout Mini Handbook (11th ed.). 2009.; an extract of the standard handbook for use as a temporary advancement record
- Boy Scout Handbook (12th ed.). 2009–2016.
- Boy Scout Handbook (13th ed.). 2016–2019.
- Scouts BSA Handbook for Boys (14th ed.). 2019.
- Scouts BSA Handbook for Girls (14th ed.). 2019.

Number of Prints by Edition
Editions	Original	1st	2nd	3rd	4th	5th	6th	7th	8th	9th	10th	11th	12th	13th
Years Printed	1 year	3 years	13 years	13 years	8 years	11 years	6 years	7 years	7 years	11 years	8 years	11 years	6 years	3 years
Total Copies	68,900	313,500	2,610,471	3,507,129	3,645,000	6,405,000	3,875,000	4,335,000	3,700,000	4,400,000	3,150,000	2,760,000	1,375,000	unknown
Average per year	68,900	104,500	200,805	269,779	455,625	582,272	645,833	619,286	528,571	400,000	393,750	307,000	229,000	unknown

== Appearance ==
=== Finish ===
Most of the handbooks were soft cover usually made of heavy paper. However, some very limited runs also used leather, vinyl and oilcloth. The paper used was always off-white with black ink with the exception of the 3rd edition that was printed using green ink. The first editions were printed in black and white. Later on, full color printing was used in the handbook itself.

The binding used until around 1970 was stitched signatures (as seen in most hardcover books). Starting at the end of the 7th edition, the cheaper perfect binding was used where each page is glued to the spin (as in a paper pad). This resulted in most Handbooks falling apart even faster, especially with the abuse scouts put them through in the field. Some coil-bound versions were introduced to resolve this issue but were sold at a higher price. Finally, the 13th edition was made available only in the coil-bound version, as is the current 14th edition.

=== Cover artwork ===
The Handbook has gone through 17 covers over the years:

- 2 line drawings
- 1 color sketch
- 1 plain cover
- 4 photo montages
- 9 paintings

Four of these covers only were not full color: Original 1910, 1st Edition, early 8th and the 14th Boy and Girl editions.

Various artists contributed to the artwork on the cover including Don Ross, the former BSA art director who is responsible for both covers of the 5th edition and Norman Rockwell who painted the 3rd, 4th, 6th and 9th editions. However, only the 6th edition was painted specifically to be a Handbook cover. The other three were originally used on the Brown & Bigelow annual Scout calendars.

== Content ==
The content of the Handbook has varied from year to year and covered a wide range of subjects essential for scouts.

For example, the 1911 First Edition included the following content:

- The Scout Oath and Scout Law
- Rank requirements
- Badges and awards
- How to tie specific knots
- Woodcraft
- Campcraft
- Tracks, Trailing and Signaling
- Health and Endurance
- Chivalry
- First Aid and Life Saving
- Games and Athletic Standards
- Patriotism and Citizenship.

The handbook has changed over time to reflect the evolution of the Boy Scouts of America program, including the implementation of the Youth Protection program and the admission of girls in the program. While many of the resources are now available online, all youth involved in Scouts BSA today still uses the Scout BSA Handbook as a reference and to track their journey in the program.

=== Firsts ===
The following subjects were first addressed in the following editions:

- Original (1910): starting a fire without matches
- 1st (1911): use of alcohol and tobacco, first aid, hiking and puberty
- 2nd (1914): conservation, safe use of knife and axe, mapping and silent signals
- 3rd (1927): compass and cooking without utensils
- 4th (1940): drug use
- 5th (1948): Scout slogan, edible wild plants, lashing and first introduction of the "Outdoor Code"
- 6th (1959): mouth-to-mouth resuscitation
- 7th (1965): first non-Caucasian people
- 8th (1972): discussion of ethnic groups and modern conservation practices
- 9th (1979): splicing and backpacking
- 10th (1990): bicycling, camping stoves, water filtration and organ donor awareness
- 11th (1998): Leave No Trace, GPS and the internet
- 12th (2009): how to tie a necktike, the food pyramid, geocaching and the Handbook website
- 13th (2016): use of multitool and STEM
- 14th (2019): teen sexting and first edition exclusively for girls

=== Advertising ===
From 1911 to 1964, advertising was found in the Handbook and helped subsidize the cost of production. The advertising stopped after 1964 with the exception of the 1975/1976 printing of the 8th Edition that also contained advertising.

Advertising was provided by companies primarily focused on categories that appealed to boys including camping-related goods, sports equipment, clothing and food products. Food products included chewing gum, canned sardines, pancakes, shredded wheat, chocolate, and baked beans. However, most ads were for rifles and ammunition. Among well-known brands that advertised in the handbook were Coca-Cola, Life Savers, Mercurochrome, Kodak, Wrigley Gum, Harley-Davidson and Aunt Jemima.

=== Variations in Content ===
Scout Handbook Comparison through the years
Edition	Original	1st	2nd	3rd	4th	5th	6th	7th	8th	9th	10th	11th	12th	13th	14th
Years	1910- 1911	1911- 1914	1914- 1927	1927- 1940	1940- 1948	1948- 1859	1959- 1965	1965- 1972	1972- 1979	1979- 1990	1990- 1998	1998- 2009	2009- 2016	2016- 2019	2019-
Handbook Content
Content Arranged by	Subject	Subject	Subject	Rank	Rank	Subject	Rank	Rank	Subject	Subject	Subject	Subject/ Rank	Subject	Subject	Subject
Advertising	No	Yes	Yes	Yes	Yes	Yes	Yes^{1}	No	Yes^{2}	No	No	No	No	No	No
Index Present	No	Yes	Yes	Yes	Yes	Yes	Yes	Yes	Yes	Yes	Yes	Yes	Yes	Yes	Yes
Scouting Information
How to become a Scout	Yes	Yes	Yes	Yes	Yes	Yes	Yes	Yes	Yes	Yes	Yes	Yes	Yes	Yes	Yes
Rank requirements	Yes	Yes	Yes	Yes	Yes	Yes	Yes	Yes	Yes	Yes	Yes	Yes	Yes	Yes	Yes
Scout Oath, Law & Motto	Yes	Yes	Yes	Yes	Yes	Yes	Yes	Yes	Yes	Yes	Yes	Yes	Yes	Yes	Yes
Scout Slogan	No	No	No	No	No	Yes	Yes	Yes	Yes	Yes	Yes	Yes	Yes	Yes	Yes
Scout Sign & Salute	Yes	Yes	Yes	Yes	Yes	Yes	Yes	Yes	Yes	Yes	Yes	Yes	Yes	Yes	Yes
Scout Handshake	5 fingers^{*}	No	3 fingers^{**}	3 fingers^{**}	3 fingers^{**}	3 fingers^{**}	3 fingers^{**}	3 fingers^{**}	5 fingers^{*}	5 fingers^{*}	5 fingers^{*}	5 fingers^{*}	5 fingers^{*}	5 fingers^{*}	5 fingers^{*}
Where to wear the uniform	No	No	Yes^{2}	Yes	Yes	Yes	Yes	Yes	No	Yes	Yes	Yes	Yes	Yes	Yes
How to wear the neckerchief	Yes	No	No	Yes^{2}	Yes	No	Yes	Yes	No	Yes	Yes	Yes	Yes	Yes	Yes
Patrol Information (name, call, etc.)	Yes	Yes	Yes	Yes	Yes	Yes	Yes	Yes	Yes	Yes	Yes	Yes	Yes	Yes	Yes
Troop Leader Duties	Yes	No	Yes	Yes	Yes	Yes	Yes	Yes	Yes	Yes	Yes	Yes	No	Yes	Yes
Scouting History	No	No	No	Yes	Yes	Yes	Yes	Yes	Yes	Yes	Yes	Yes	Yes	No	No
Sr. Scouting, Exploring & Venturing	No	No	No	No	Yes	Yes	Yes	Yes	Yes	Yes	Yes	Yes	Yes	Yes	Yes
Varsity & Venture Scouting	No	No	No	No	No	No	No	No	No	No	Yes	Yes	Yes	Yes	No
Sea Scouting & Sea Exploring	Yes	No	Yes	Yes	Yes	Yes^{1}	No	No	No	No	No	Yes	No	Yes	Yes
Lone Scouting & others	No	No	Yes^{2}	Yes	Yes	No	No	No	No	No	Yes	Yes	No	No	No
Other
List of Official BSA Equipment	No	Yes	No	Yes^{2}	Yes	No	No	No	No	No	No	No	No	No	No

^{1}Early prints only
^{2}Late prints only
^{*}International Handshake
^{**}Boy Scouts of America Handshake
