= Mecklenburg County Council =

Scouting America council in Charlotte

Mecklenburg County Council #415
- Owner: Scouting America
- Location: Charlotte, North Carolina
- Country: United States
- Founded: 1940
- President: Rich Carter
- Scout Executive: Mark Turner
- Website www.mccscouting.org

Mecklenburg County Council is a Scouting America council serving Mecklenburg County, North Carolina. The council was founded in 1915 and its offices are located in Charlotte.

== History ==
Charlotte Council (#415) was founded in 1940, changing its name to Mecklenburg County Council (#415) in 1942.

== Organization ==
The council is divided geographically into three districts:

- Apache District: Southwestern Mecklenburg County
- Etowah District: Southeastern Mecklenburg County
- Hornets Nest District: Northern Mecklenburg County

== Camps ==
It operates two camp facilities, Belk Scout Camp (Formerly Clear Creek Scout Camp) in Midland, North Carolina, and Camp Grimes at Mecklenburg Scout Reservation, outside of the council borders near Marion, North Carolina.

== Order of the Arrow ==
The council is served by Catawba Lodge 459 of the Order of the Arrow. The lodge was chartered on June 18, 1951, and is named after the Catawba Native Americans who inhabited the Mecklenburg County area for many centuries. The translation of Catawba is "People of the River". The lodge totem is the Hornet's Nest.
