= Scoutcraft =

Skills required by people seeking to venture into wild country

Scoutcraft is a term used to cover a variety of woodcraft knowledge and skills required by people seeking to venture into wild country and sustain themselves independently. The term has been adopted by Scouting organizations to reflect skills and knowledge which are felt to be a core part of the various programs, alongside community and spirituality. Skills commonly included are camping, cooking, first aid, wilderness survival, orienteering and pioneering.

== Origins ==
For Europeans, Scoutcraft grew out of the woodcraft skills necessary to survive in the expanding frontiers of the New World in the eighteenth and nineteenth centuries. Frontiersmen such as Daniel Boone needed these skills to travel through the uncharted wildernesses and difficult terrains. But Scoutcraft was practiced by the Native Americans long before the arrival of the colonists and it was from Native American scouts that the art of Scoutcraft, or Woodcraft as it was more commonly known in the American Old West, passed to the early European pioneers.

As the nineteenth century moved on, Scoutcraft began to be adopted by parts of some military forces, as the way in which wars and battles were fought changed. The American scout Frederick Russell Burnham brought Scoutcraft to Africa and, in the Second Matabele War, he introduced it to Robert Baden-Powell, the founder of the Scouting movement. Baden-Powell first began forming his idea for a programme of training young men in Scoutcraft whilst scouting with Burnham in Matobo Hills, Matabeleland (now part of Zimbabwe). Later, Baden-Powell wrote a number of books on the subject, and even started to train and make use of adolescent boys, most famously during the Siege of Mafeking, during the Second Boer War.

== Scouting ==
After the Second Boer War, Baden-Powell enjoyed a celebrity status for his command at Mafeking. He set about writing a new book, Scouting for Boys, which was published in 1908. This was removed from his earlier, more martial works, but kept the idea of Scoutcraft as a core part of the Scouting program. Some critics accused Baden-Powell of trying to create a pseudo-military organisation, but he was quick to distance himself and Scouting from his earlier military experiences, and instead pointed out the importance of self-reliance, duty and thoughtfulness which his new program promoted.

In order to test that a new member had earned the title of Scout, Baden-Powell devised a number of tests for them to complete, including knot-tying, animal tracking, first aid, navigation, and fire-lighting. Other tests listed by Baden-Powell include having sixpence in a bank, and knowing about the Union Flag and its significance — these latter tests are generally not included in Scoutcraft in more recent times. Similar books were published in America by Ernest Thompson Seton, a pioneer of the Scouting movement in the United States.

Scoutcraft is still a core part of many organisations' programs. The Scout Association of the United Kingdom lists the following benefits of Scoutcraft:

- encourages self-reliance, resourcefulness and confidence in their own ability
- develops skills to be used in the outdoors
- provides training for what to do in emergency situations

== Skills ==
An example list of Scoutcraft skills, taken from 1964's Boy Scout Handbook (sixth edition) includes:

- Camp Cooking
- Camp Health
- Camp Preparation
- Cleanup
- Edible Wild Plants
- Finding Directions
- Fire Building
- First aid
- Hiking
- Knowing Trees and Shrubs
- Lashings
- Map Reading
- Map Sketching
- Preparing Firewood
- Selecting [a] Campsite
- Signaling
- Swimming
- Tent Pitching
- Use of [a] Compass
- Using [an] Axe in Camp
- Wildlife

== See also ==
- Batoning
