= Advancement and recognition in Scouting America =

Scouting America program regarding awards

Advancement and recognition in Scouting America is a tradition dating from the inception of the Scouting movement. A fundamental purpose of advancement is the self-confidence a young man or woman acquires from his participation in Scouting. Advancement is one of the methods used in the "Aims and Methods of Scouting"– character development, citizenship training and personal fitness.

There are separate advancement and recognition programs for the main program divisions: Cub Scouting (ages six through 10), Scouts BSA (formerly Boy Scouting) (11–17), Venturing (14–20), and Sea Scouting (14–20) (and, formerly, through the now discontinued Varsity Scouting (14–18)). Each program is designed for its age group and goals.

== Cub Scouting ==
Scouting uses eight methods to fulfill its aims of character development, citizenship training, leadership, and physical fitness. Advancement is one of the eight methods. Cub Scouts use activities call Adventures to earn promotion, following a three step process of: preparation, qualification, and recognition. Cub Scouting is designed to function around the traditional school year with the goal of earning advancement by the end of the year. Youth participate in Cub Scouting from age 5 to 10, working through Lion, Bobcat, Tiger, Wolf, Bear, Webelos, and Arrow of Light.

In addition to the Adventures used to earn promotion, Cub Scouts can work to earn multiple other individual awards though participation in special programs, many of which happen during the summer time. These include Outdoor Activity Award, Shooting Sports Award, World Conservation Award, National Summer Time Pack Award, Whittling Chip (For Bears and Webelos), Cyber-chip, Interpreter Strip, Messenger of Peace, Nova and Supernova, Recruiter Strip, Religious Emblems, and Service Stars.

== Scouts BSA ==
=== Advancement in Scouts BSA ===
The advancement program for Scouting America (formerly known as Scouts BSA) has two phases. The first phase of Scout to First Class is designed to teach the Scoutcraft skills, how to participate in a group and to learn self-reliance. Scout is the joining rank, and is awarded when the Scout demonstrates a rudimentary knowledge of the Scouting ideals. Tenderfoot, Second Class and First Class have progressively harder requirements in the areas of Scoutcraft, physical fitness, citizenship, personal growth and Scout Spirit.

Focus turns toward individual achievement, leadership and community service once First Class is earned. The ranks of Star, Life and Eagle require a set number of merit badges (minimum of 21 for Eagle Scout, with 13 from a compulsory list), as well as a minimum of time spent in a troop leadership position, and community service requirements, among other things. The rank of Eagle Scout requires the Scout plan, develop and lead their own service project that benefits their community or an organization other than Scouting. In 2010, the Life Scout rank added a specific teaching requirement, where a Star-rank Scout must teach a younger Scout certain requirements for one of the early ranks.

Several religious emblems programs are administered by various religious institutions and recognized by Scouting America. These are generally recognized by a medal and an embroidered square knot. Many other advancement and recognitions—such as the 50-Miler Award, Aquatics Awards, Outdoor Ethics Awards, Crime Prevention Award, Emergency Preparedness Award and World Conservation Award —are available to Scouts who show performance in special areas.

Scouts may earn the Den Chief Service Award for their service as a Cub Scout Den Chief.

There are also several positions of responsibility within each troop, which is usually divided into patrols, with patrol leaders and assistant patrol leaders. The troop itself has a senior patrol leader as its youth leader, along with an assistant senior patrol leader, and several other positions of responsibility, such as scribe, quartermaster, librarian, instructor, historian and chaplain's aide. Holding some sort of responsibility in the troop is a requirement for higher advancement ranks.

=== Order of the Arrow ===
The Order of the Arrow is Scouting America's national honor society for experienced campers.

Awards are separate and distinct from the membership levels of Ordeal and Brotherhood. Awards available through the Order of the Arrow include the Vigil Honor, Founder's Award, Distinguished Service Award, Lifetime Achievement Award, Red Arrow Award, E. Urner Goodman Camping Award, E. Urner Goodman, Scholarship Fund, National Service Award. Scholastic awards are also available to Arrowmen to aid in education expenses.

== Varsity Scouting (1984-2017) ==
Advancement was a key part of the Varsity program. Varsity Scouts earned any award or recognition that were available to Boy Scouts, including merit badges, rank advancements, and other awards. There were also several awards that were only available to Varsity Scouts, and sometimes their leaders. Due to the decision by the Church of Jesus Christ of Latter-Day Saints to cease participation in the Varsity Scouting program, BSA ultimately decided to end the Varsity Scouting program, effective January 1, 2018.

== Venturing ==
=== Youth advancement ===
A Bronze Award may be earned for each category of arts and hobbies, outdoor, community and religious life, sea Scouting and sports. After earning at least one Bronze Award and meeting tenure, leadership, personal growth and other requirements the Venturer may earn the Gold Award. To earn the Silver Award, the Venturer must earn the Gold Award, earn first aid and CPR certifications, show leadership and participate in ethics training.

Venturers may also earn expert awards that build on some areas of the Bronze Awards. These include the Venturing Ranger Award (Outdoors); the TRUST Award (Community and Religious Life); the Quest Award (Sports); and the Quartermaster Award (Sea Scouting).

Male members under the age of 18 may also earn Merit Badges and the Star, Life, and Eagle Scout ranks from the Scouts BSA program if they have earned at least First Class rank in a Scout troop.

=== Venturing Leadership Award ===
Both youth and adults are eligible for the Venturing Leadership Award. There are three levels of these awards: council (for those at the crew, district, and/or council levels), region (for those at the area or region levels) and National. A limited number of these awards are presented on an annual basis to those involved in Venturing who have made exceptional contributions to Venturing at their particular level and who exemplify the Venturing Code. These awards are similar in scope to the Silver Beaver Award, Silver Antelope Award, and Silver Buffalo Award.

== Sea Scouting ==
In Sea Scouts, the traditional advancement program consists of the 4 ranks in the following order Apprentice, Ordinary, Able, and finally Quartermaster. Quartermaster is the highest Sea Scout Rank and is equivalent to Eagle Scout or Venturing Silver Award.

SEAL Training, (Sea Scout Experience Advanced Leadership Training ), is the highest level of Leadership Training. The program originated in 1996 and at the time was under the name of Sea Exploring, however in 1998 when Venturing was formed the organization was known as Sea Scouts. The name SEAL training did not change. There are about 4-6 course per year held around the country. Participants age over 14.5 to less than 18 years old. Participants must have earned the rank of Ordinary before attending the course. Approximately 80% of participants pass the course. The course is similar to NAYLE or what was previously known as NJLIC. Upon successful graduation from the course the student may wear the SEAL Pin on their uniform. This is the only youth earned pin that an Adult may wear.

Sea Scouts may choose to earn any Venturing awards, advancement, and training if they wish to. A Sea Scout who has earned the rank of 1st Class in a Scouts BSA Troop may complete further Scouts BSA ranks and training from within their Sea Scout Ship.

== Outdoor Code ==
Since March 1954, the Outdoor Code has represented the core teachings of "Scouting's Outdoor Ethics" and serves as both a goal and a promise:

As an American, I will do my best to –

Be clean in my outdoor manners.
Be careful with fire.
Be considerate in the outdoors.
Be conservation minded.

== Lifesaving and meritorious action awards ==
BSA's National Court of Honor is responsible for lifesaving and meritorious awards. All Courts of Honor for Eagle Scout rank are convened as National Courts of Honor also.

Honor Medal With Crossed Palms
A lifesaving award presented to a registered BSA member (youth or adult leader) who has demonstrated both unusual heroism and extraordinary skill or resourcefulness in saving or attempting to save a life at extreme risk to self; may be awarded posthumously.
Honor Medal
A lifesaving award presented to a registered BSA member (youth or adult leader) who has demonstrated unusual heroism in saving or attempting to save a life at considerable risk to self.
Heroism Award
A lifesaving award presented to a registered BSA member (youth or adult leader) who has demonstrated heroism and skill in saving or attempting to save life at minimal personal risk.
Medal of Merit
Awarded to BSA members (youth or adult leaders) who have performed an outstanding act of service and exceptional character by putting into practice Scouting skills and ideals. It does not need to involve risk to self.
National Certificate of Merit
This award may be presented by the National Court of Honor to a registered BSA member (youth or adult leader) who has performed a significant act of service that is deserving of special national recognition. Such action need not involve attempts of rescue or risk to self, but puts into practice Scouting skills or ideals.
Local Council Certificate of Merit (No. 606760)
This may be awarded by local BSA councils for individual meritorious actions by a registered BSA member (youth or adult leader) that do not merit national recognition.

== Nova and Supernova Awards ==
These STEM (Science, Technology, Engineering and Math) awards are for all three levels of youth scouting. Cub Scouts, Boy Scouts and Venturers may all earn up to four Nova awards, each based on one of the four STEM principles. The Supernova award is a culmination of the youth's work on the Nova award and there are a number of various Supernova awards that the scout may earn.

== Adult leader awards ==
=== Cub Scout leader recognition ===
Cub Scout leaders who complete training, tenure, and performance requirements are recognized by a system of awards. The Cub Scout Den Leader Training Award is available for Den Leaders, the Scouter's Training Award is for any registered Cub Scout leader, and the Scouter's Key and Unit Leader Award of Merit are for Cubmasters. These awards are recognized by a certificate and an embroidered square knot insignia with the appropriate square knot device pin (indicates program or rank for which the award was earned).

=== Scouts, BSA leader recognition ===
Scouts, BSA adult leaders who complete training, tenure, and performance requirements are recognized by a system of awards. The Scouter's Training Award is available to any leader, while the Scoutmaster's Key and the Unit Leader Award of Merit are only available to the Scoutmaster.

=== Varsity Scout leader recognition ===
The Boy Scouts of America ended the Varsity Scouting program, effective January 1, 2018.

Adult Varsity leaders were able to earn the Varsity Letter and activity pins. They met the same requirements as the youth and also had to complete Fast Start and Basic Leader Training (New Leader Essentials and Varsity Coach Leader Specific Training), attend six Varsity Roundtables, and complete a minimum of six months tenure.

Varsity Scout leaders who completed tenure, training and performance requirements were able to earn the Varsity Scout Leader Training Award. Varsity Coaches were able to earn the Varsity Coach's Key and the National President's Varsity Scout Coach Award of Merit.

=== Venturing leader recognition ===
Venturing adult leaders who complete training, tenure, and performance requirements are recognized by a system of awards. The Venturing Leader's Training Award is available to any leader, while the Venturing Advisor's Key and Venturing Advisor Award of Merit are only available to the Advisor.

=== Sea Scout leader recognition ===
Sea Scout adult leaders who complete training, tenure, and performance requirements are recognized by a system of awards. The Sea Scout Leader's Training Award (part of the Scouter's Training Award series) is available to any leader, while the Skipper's Key is only available to Skippers. Seabadge is an advanced leadership program for all Sea Scout leaders. Seabadge can be worn as a pin or a knot with a single trident. Unofficial knots with multiple tridents are sometimes worn to represent a staff member or course director.

Sea Scout adult leaders may also wear the SEAL pin if they, earned it as a youth, served as course director, or served as a course director's mate.

Sea Scout adult leaders may also receive the Venturing Leadership Award

=== Commissioner recognition ===
Commissioners who complete training, tenure, and performance requirements are recognized by a system of awards. The Arrowhead Honor is for commissioners who exhibit quality performance and leadership. The Roundtable Staff Training Award (part of the Scouter's Training Award series) is available to Cub Scout, Boy Scout, Varsity Scout and Venturing roundtable staff. The Commissioner's Key (part of the Scouter's Key series) is available for roundtable commissioners, district commissioner, assistant district commissioners, unit commissioners, council commissioners and assistant council commissioners. The Distinguished Commissioner Service Award recognizes commissioners who provide quality service over a period of at least five years.

=== Scouter's Training Award ===
The Scouter's Training Award is a set of recognitions for leaders who complete tenure, training and performance requirements.

- Cub Scout Leader's Training Award for the Cubmaster, Den Leaders, pack committee chair and pack committee members
- Scouts, BSA Leader's Training Award for the Scoutmaster, assistant Scoutmasters, troop committee chair and troop committee members
- Venturing Leader's Training Award for the Advisor, associate Advisors, crew committee chairman and crew committee members
- Sea Scout Leader's Training Award for the Skipper, mates, ship committee chairman and ship committee members

=== Scouter's Key ===
The Scouter's Key is a set of recognitions for primary unit leaders who complete advanced tenure, training and performance requirements.

- Cubmaster's Key
- Scoutmaster's Key
- Venturing Advisor's Key
- Commissioner's Key for roundtable commissioners, district commissioner, assistant district commissioners, unit commissioners, council commissioners and assistant council commissioner
- District Committee's Key for the district committee chairman and members

=== Unit Leader Award of Merit ===
The Unit Leader Award of Merit is for Cubmasters, Scoutmasters, Venturing Crew Advisors, and Sea Scout Skippers who meet 7 requirements for tenure, personal training, unit quality and youth training.

- Cubmaster Award of Merit
- Scoutmaster Award of Merit
- Venturing Crew Advisor Award of Merit
- Sea Scout Skipper Award of Merit

=== Leadership and training awards ===
- Powderhorn
- Wood Badge
- Sea Badge
- National Youth Leadership Training (NYLT)

=== Distinguished service awards ===
Distinguished service awards are presented at various levels to recognize noteworthy and extraordinary service to youth.

- District Award of Merit – district level
- Silver Beaver Award – council level
- Silver Antelope Award – regional level
- Silver Buffalo Award – national level
- Silver World Award – international level
- National Eagle Scout Association Outstanding Eagle Scout Award – council to regional level
- Distinguished Eagle Scout Award – national level

=== Service awards ===
- International Scouter's Award
- Community Organization Award
  - AFL–CIO George Meany Award (is also part of this category, but retains the use of its original square knot)
  - Alpha Phi Omega Herbert G. Horton Service to Youth Award
  - American Legion Scouting Square Knot Award
  - Benevolent and Protective Order of Elks (BPOE) Marvin M. Lewis Award
  - International Fellowship of Scouting Rotarians (IFSR) Cliff Dochterman Award, (Rotary)
  - Masonic Daniel Carter Beard Scouter Award, (Masons)
  - National Society of the Sons of the American Revolution Robert E. Burt Boy Scout Volunteer Award,
  - Ruritan National Service Clubs Scout Leader Community Service Award,
  - United States Power Squadrons Raymond A. Finley Jr. Sea Scout Service Award,
  - VFW Scouter's Achievement Award,
  - United States Military Outstanding Volunteer Service Medal, U.S. DoD

=== National service awards ===
Scouting Service Award

- Whitney Young Service Award

Named after Whitney M Young Jr., and recognizes outstanding services by an adult individual or an organization for demonstrated involvement in the development and implementation of Scouting opportunities for youth from rural or low-income urban backgrounds.

- ¡Scouting ... Vale la pena! Service Award

Recognizes outstanding services by an adult individual or an organization for demonstrated involvement in the development and implementation of Scouting opportunities for Hispanic American/Latino youth.

- Asian American Spirit of Scouting Service Award

Recognizes outstanding services by an adult individual or an organization for demonstrated involvement in the development and implementation of Scouting opportunities for Asian American youth.

- Special Needs Scouting Service Award

Honors an adult (volunteer or professional) for bringing Scouting opportunities to Scouts with disabilities.

- American Indian Scouting Association Grey Wolf Award

Honors and adult for bringing Scouting opportunities to American Indian youth.

=== Support of Scouting awards ===
- James E West Fellowship Award
  - 1910 Society
    - Ernest Thompson Seton, Daniel Carter Beard, Theodore Roosevelt and Waite Phillips levels
  - Founder's Circle
    - Bronze, Silver, Gold and Platinum levels
- William D. Boyce New-Unit Organizer Award

=== Square knot system ===
Adult leaders display their awards on their uniform through a system of square knots above the left uniform pocket, much as a member of the military would with their ribbons. Although the square knot system was created for adult scouters, there are some square knot awards such as the youth religious emblem which can be granted to scouters below the age of 18.

== Memorials ==
- Spirit of the Eagle Award

== Unit awards ==
- Journey To Excellence (JTE) Award (formerly National Quality Unit Award)
- Veteran Unit Award
- BSA Ready & Prepared Award

== Scholarships ==
- American Legion Eagle Scout of the Year Scholarship
- Eastern Orthodox Committee on Scouting scholarships
- Emmett J. Doerr Memorial Scout Scholarship for Catholic Scouts
- National Eagle Scout Association (NESA) scholarships
- Mervyn Sluizer Jr. Scholarship for Philadelphia-area Scouts
- National Jewish Committee on Scouting Eagle Scout Scholarship Programs
- Sons of the American Revolution (SAR) Arthur M. & Berdena King Eagle Scout Scholarship
- Veterans of Foreign Wars (VFW) Scout of the Year Scholarship
- William M. Minto Memorial Scholarship For Sea Scouts
- The E. Urner Goodman Scholarship program has been suspended and is no longer available.

Wood Badge Scholarships for Scouters

- AFL-CIO Wood Badge Scholarship Program
- VFW Wood Badge Scholarship Program
- some American Legion Departments (e.g., North Carolina, Pennsylvania, Illinois, etc.) offer Wood Badge Scholarships

== Special opportunities ==
Aquatics

- Scouting America Boardsailing
- Scouting America Kayaking
- Scouting America Mile Swim
- Scouting America Scuba
- Scouting America Snorkeling
- Scouting America Stand Up Paddleboarding
- Scouting America Whitewater Rafting
- Scouting America Lifeguard
- Long Cruise - Sea Scouts
- Qualified Seaman - Sea Scouts
- Small Boat Handler - Sea Scouts

Conservation

- The Conservation Good Turn Award for Cub Scout Packs, Scout Troops and Venturing Crews
- Cub Scout World Conservation Award
- Scouts BSA World Conservation Award
- Venturing World Conservation Award
- Outdoor Ethics Awareness Award
- Outdoor Ethics Action Award
- Keep America Beautiful Hometown USA Award - Scouts
- Distinguished Conservation Service Awards
  - Distinguished Conservation Service Award – Scouts
  - Distinguished Conservationist Award - Adults
  - Distinguished Conservation Service Award Certificate - Organizations

Disabilities

- Torch of Gold Certificate – To recognize youth and adult members who have provided outstanding service in the area of Scouts with disabilities
- Woods Services Award – A national-level recognition for volunteer adults who provide outstanding service to Scouts with disabilities

Outdoors

- 50-Miler Award
- Historic Trails Award
- National Medal for Outdoor Achievement
- National Outdoor Challenge Unit Award

Scoutcraft

- Firem'n Chit
- Paul Bunyan Woodsman
- Totin' Chip
- Whittlin' Chip

International

- International Spirit Award - Scouts and Scouters
- International Scouter Award - Scouters

Tenure

- Service stars
- Veteran Scouter Pin

Other

- Interpreter's Strips (17 languages including ASL and Morse Code)
- Recruiter Strip – all Scouts

Retired

- International Activity Patch
- Cub Scout Outdoor Activity Award
- Emergency Preparedness Award

== Awards from other organizations ==
- Alpha Phi Omega offers the Scouting Recognition Certificate
- The American Legion offers the Eagle Scout of the Year Award
- The United States Department of Defense offers the Youth Certificate of Recognition

== Awards no longer in use ==
These awards are no longer awarded, but may be worn by those who earned them:

- BSA Physical Fitness Award
- BSA Ready and Prepared Award
- BSA Young American Award
- Cub Scout Leave No Trace Awareness Award
- Den Mother's Training Award- awarded from 1956, renamed to Den Leader's Training Award in 1967
- Den Leader Coach Training Award- awarded from 1967 to 2006, replaced by the Pack Trainer Award
- Explorer Silver- awarded from 1949 to 1964
- Explorer Achievement Award- awarded from 1981 to 1995, replaced by the Explorer G.O.L.D. Award
- Explorer G.O.L.D. Award- awarded from 1995 to 1998
- Explorer Ranger Award- awarded from 1944 to 1949
- Explorer Ace Award- awarded from 1942 to 1954
- Heroism Award- a lifesaving award presented to a registered youth member or adult leader who has demonstrated heroism in saving or attempting to save a life at minimum risk to self
- National Camping Award- replaced by the National Outdoor Challenge Unit Award in 2010
- Silver Fawn Award- equivalent of the Silver Beaver Award for female leaders issued from 1971 to 1974
- Tiger Cub Coach Award— renamed to Tiger Cub Den Leader Award
- Varsity Scout Leader's Training Award for the Coach, assistant Coaches, team committee chairman, team committee member
- Varsity Scout Coach's Key
- William H. Spurgeon III Award – moved to Exploring (Learning for Life)

== Sources ==
- scouting.org – The official BSA Website for Scouting in the US.
- MeritBadge.Org – is a Wikipedia that provides resources to Scouts and leaders in the US.
- USScouts.Org – another volunteer site that provides resources to Scouts and leaders in the US.
