= Square knot insignia =

Scout association insignia

- Square knot Figure-eight knot

Square knot insignia are embroidered cloth patches that represent awards of the Scout associations throughout the world.

The Scout Association of the United Kingdom uses a "figure-eight" knot and many Scouting organizations of the Commonwealth countries follow suit. The World Organization of the Scout Movement uses military-style ribbons. Scouting America uses a square knot made of colored ropes is depicted; the colors are generally dictated by the award the insignia is associated with.

== History ==
In the earliest days of the Scouting Movement military veterans were urged into service as Scoutmasters. The first Scout uniforms therefore resembled military uniforms. It was common for these veterans to wear their military decorations on their modified Boy Scout uniform — a national uniform was not to be developed until the early 1920s.

Military tradition dictated that the actual medal from a military award was only worn on ceremonial occasions — at other times, it was replaced with a thin ribbon bar with the same ribbon style as found attached to the medal. This carried over to Scouting, whose awards were medals, similar to the military, but were most often worn as ribbons.

The first country to switch over from military ribbons to a unique parallel was the United Kingdom, which introduced its knot emblems in 1922.

== Scouting America ==
The Boy Scouts of America likewise moved away from allowing Scouters to wear military ribbons, but kept the style, introducing their own ribbons in place of medals in 1934. The BSA introduced its own square knot insignia in lieu of the military-style ribbons in 1947. The choice of the square knot as the common emblem was made by James E. West, who is said to have chosen it for its use as the knot associated with first aid, thereby reminding Scouts to continue to be of service to others.

The first eight awards with square knot insignia in the BSA were the Eagle Scout Award, Quartermaster Award, Scouter's Training Award, Scouter's Key, Silver Beaver Award, Silver Antelope Award, Silver Buffalo Award, and Honor Medal.

Since the introduction of square knot insignia, over forty new awards have been added, then combined, and some retired. Currently, there are 32 nationally authorized square knot insignia representing various medals, medallions, certificates, plaques, and other awards.

There are a few cases of local Council-approved square knots and various popular unofficial or spoof knots.

In Scouting America, square knot insignia are worn in rows of three across the top of the wearer's left pocket. Though there is no rule limiting the number of such insignia that may be worn, some suggest limiting to three rows of three. When fewer than three knots are worn in a particular row, knots are generally centered to the pocket, or the row below.

Dates indicated in the chart below indicate the use of the square knot insignia for the particular award, and may not correspond to the history of the award itself. For example, the first Eagle Scout Award was presented in 1912, and there was a ribbon bar for it from 1934. It was among the first eight awards given square knot insignia in 1947, so that later date is indicated.

=== Achievement Awards ===
These awards are generally earned by the Scouts themselves.
These represent the highest youth rank or achievement in each respective program of Scouting America.

Insignia	Title	Started	Description
Arrow of Light	Arrow of Light (Cub Scouts)	1979	Highest rank of the Cub Scouting program (ages 5-11)
Eagle Scout Award	Eagle Scout (Scouts BSA)	1947	Highest rank of the Scouting program (ages 11-18)
Eagle Scout - NESA Life Member	Eagle Scout with Life Membership in NESA	2008	Indicates lifetime membership in the National Eagle Scout Association
Quartermaster Award	Quartermaster Award (Sea Scouts)	1947	Highest rank in the Sea Scouting program (ages 14-20)
venturing summit award	Silver Award / Summit Award (Venturing)	1999	Highest rank in the Venturing program (ages 14-20)

=== Distinguished service ===
These awards are generally granted via nomination and review; they cannot be earned or applied for by Scouts or Scouters directly.

Insignia	Title	Started	Description
Unit Leader's Award of Merit	Unit Leader Award of Merit	2010	Unit-level quality leader recognition award
District Award of Merit	District Award of Merit	1971	District-level distinguished service award
Silver Beaver Award	Silver Beaver Award	1947	Council-level distinguished service award
Silver Antelope Award	Silver Antelope Award	1947	Territory-level distinguished service award
Silver Buffalo Award	Silver Buffalo Award	1947	National-level distinguished service award
Silver World Award	Silver World Award	1976	International-level distinguished service award

=== Heroism ===
These awards are generally granted via nomination and review; they cannot be earned or applied for by Scouts or Scouters directly.

Insignia	Title	Started	Description
Medal of Merit	Medal of Merit	1952	Performed an act of service of a rare or exceptional character that reflects an uncommon degree of concern for the well-being of others.
Heroism Award	Heroism Award	1983	Demonstrated heroism and skill in averting serious injury or saving or attempting to save life at minimum risk to self. Discontinued late 2012; reinstated February 2018
Honor Medal	Honor Medal	1947	Demonstrated unusual heroism and skill or resourcefulness in saving or attempting to save life at considerable risk to self. Awarded with crossed palms for situations with extreme risk to self.

=== Leadership and training ===
These awards are generally earned by the Scouters themselves.

Insignia	Title	Started	Description
Den Leader's Training Award	Den Leader Training Award	1989	
Scouter's Training Award	Scouter's Training Award	1947	
Scouter's Key	Scouter's Key	1947	
Commissioner Award of Excellence in Unit Service	Commissioner Award of Excellence in Unit Service	2011	
Doctorate of Commissioner Science	Doctorate of Commissioner Science	2008	
Philmont Training Center Masters Track Award	Philmont Training Center Masters Track Award	2008	
Professional Scouter Training Award	Professional Training Award	1980	

=== Special achievements ===
These awards are generally earned by the Scouts and Scouters themselves.
In one case (James E. West Fellowships) nomination by others is also possible.

Insignia	Title	Started	Description
Youth Religious Emblem	Youth Religious Emblems	1971	
Distinguished Conservation Service Award	Distinguished Conservation Service Award	2020	Replaced William T. Hornaday Awards
James E. West Fellowship Award	James E. West Fellowship	1993	
International Scouter Award	International Scouter Award	2002	
William D. Boyce New-Unit Organizer Award	William D. Boyce New-Unit Organizer Award	2005	
Alumni Award	Alumni Award	2011	Presented to Scouting alumni who promote continued engagement with Scouting America

=== Special service recognition ===
These awards are generally granted via nomination and review; they cannot be earned or applied for by Scouts or Scouters directly.

Insignia	Title	Started	Description
Adult Religious Award	Adult Religious Awards	1973	Distinguished Service to Scouts and Youth associated with a religious community or organization
Order of the Arrow Distinguished Service Award	Order of the Arrow Distinguished Service Award	1976	Distinguished service to the Order of the Arrow
Distinguished Commissioner Service Award	Distinguished Commissioner Service Award	1987	Distinguished Service as a Commissioner at the unit, district, or council level
Community Organization Awards	Community Organization Awards	2002	Distinguished Service to Scouts and Youth affiliated with a non-religious community organization
Venturing Leadership Award	Venturing Leadership Award	2004	Distinguished Service to Venturing and Venturers
Scouting Service Award	Scouting Service Award	2017	Distinguished Service to Scouts of a specific ethnic or special needs identity; Incorporates - Whitney M. Young Jr. Service Award, Scouting ... Vale la pena! Service Award, Asian American Spirit of Scouting Service Award, American Indian Scouting Association Grey Wolf Award, Special Needs Scouting Service Award
Military Service Knot	Military Service Knot	2026	Military veterans and active-duty service members

=== Order of precedence ===
There is no official direction on the order of precedence of these awards by Scouting America, other than that those deemed most important should be worn on his or her own right (closest to the heart).

Prevailing Scouting custom tends to follow the military recognitions order of precedence in some ways, prioritizing honor and valor awards highest, distinguished selective recognition over broad participation, long time service over single event or action achievements, the scope of impact, the length of service, and service over training, as well as awards that require nomination over those that can be earned directly by the individual.

=== Discontinued ===
These awards have been completely discontinued or combined and represented by current award knots.

Insignia	Title	Started	Ended	Description
William T. Hornaday Award	William T. Hornaday Medals	1991	2020	Superseded by Distinguished Conservation Service Award
Skipper's Key	Skipper's Key	1947	1949	Superseded by Scouter's Key
Ranger Award	Exploring Ranger Award	1933	1951	Superseded by "Ranger" bar
Air Scout Ace Award	Air Scout Ace Award	1950	1954	
Exploring Silver Award (Type I)	Exploring Silver Award	1954	1958	
Multiple Exploring Awards	Exploring Awards Knot	1954	1998	
William H. Spurgeon Award	William H. Spurgeon III Award	1989	2007	Recognition for individuals and organizations contributing significant leadership to the Exploring program
Scoutmaster Award of Merit	Scoutmaster Award of Merit	1987	2010	Superseded by Unit Leader Award of Merit
Scoutmaster Award of Merit	Venturing Advisor / Varsity Coach Award of Merit	1999	2010	Superseded by Unit Leader Award of Merit
Pack Trainer Award	Pack Trainer Award	2006	2011	Superseded by Scouter's Training Award
Cubmaster Award	Cubmaster Award	1989	2012	Superseded by Scouter's Key
Cub Scouter Award	Cub Scouter Award	1989	2012	Superseded by Scouter's Training Award
Den Leader Coach Award	Den Leader Coach Award	1989	2012	Superseded by Den Leader Training Award
Webelos Den Leader Award	Webelos Den Leader Award	1989	2012	Superseded by Den Leader Training Award
Tiger Cub Den Leader Award	Tiger Cub Den Leader Award	1992	2012	Superseded by Den Leader Training Award
George Meany Award	George Meany Award	1987	2011	Incorporated in Community Organization Award
Sea Badge	Sea Badge	1989	2012	Superseded by Seabadge Trident pin
Asian American Spirit of Scouting Service Award	Asian American Spirit of Scouting Service Award	2003	2016	Incorporated in Scouting Service Award
¡Scouting ... Vale la peña! Service Award	¡Scouting...Vale la Pena! Service Award	2003	2016	Incorporated in Scouting Service Award
Whitney M. Young Jr. Service Award	Whitney M. Young Jr. Service Award	1989	2016	Incorporated in Scouting Service Award
Speakers Bank Award	Speakers Bank Award	2007	2011	Discontinued

== The Scout Association (UK) ==
The British Scout Association introduced the idea of a cloth 'knot' insignia in 1922, modeled after the military use of ribbons to represent medals and other citations. Many of the Scouting organizations of the Commonwealth of Nations either copy the British system or simply use the British awards and insignia.

=== Gallantry ===
Insignia	Title	Started	Description
Bronze Cross	Bronze Cross	Year	The Bronze Cross is the highest gallantry award given by the Scout Association UK for special heroism or action in the face of extraordinary risk.
Silver Cross	Silver Cross	Year	The Silver Cross Award is a prestigious accolade within the UK Scout Association, awarded for gallantry in circumstances of considerable risk. This award is a testament to the recipient's bravery and commitment to duty, often in challenging and perilous situations.
Gilt Cross	Gilt Cross	Year	The Gilt Cross Award is a prestigious accolade within the UK Scout system, awarded for gallantry in circumstances of moderate risk. It is a symbol of bravery and acts of heroism where life is at risk.
Cornwell Scout Badge	Cornwell Scout Badge	Year	is a gallantry award of The Scout Association of the United Kingdom and some of its branches in other countries. It is awarded in recognition of devotion to duty, courage and endurance.

=== Meritorious Conduct ===
Insignia	Title	Started	Description
Medal for Meritorious Conduct	Medal for Meritorious Conduct	Year	The Chief Scouts Medal for Meritorious Conduct is the highest award for acts of bravery and service within the UK Scouts.
Chief Scout's Commendation for Meritorious Conduct	Chief Scout's Commendation for Meritorious Conduct	Year	The Chief Scout's Commendation for Meritorious Conduct is one of the highest awards within the UK Scouts. It is awarded for acts of bravery, dedication, and outstanding service to the Scouts.

=== Service ===
Insignia	Title	Started	Description
Silver Wolf	Silver Wolf	Year	The Silver Wolf is the highest award made by The Scout Association (UK) "for services of the most exceptional character." It is an unrestricted gift of the Chief Scout.
Silver Acorn	Silver Acorn	Year	The Silver Acorn is awarded after at least 20 years’ service, which should be specially distinguished and appreciably better than outstanding.
Award for Merit	Award for Merit	Year	The Award of Merit is awarded for outstanding service. It implies keen, conscientious, imaginative and dedicated service over a sustained period, of at least 10 years duration.
Chief Scout's Commendation for Good Service	Chief Scout's Commendation for Good Service	Year	The Chief Scout's Commendation is awarded in respect of not less than 5 years good service, which stands out. It should be regarded as the Chief Scout's recognition of the very real contribution made to the Scouts by the individual concerned.
Chief Scout's Personal Award	Chief Scout's Personal Award	Year	The Chief Scout's Award is a prestigious recognition in the UK Scouting system, awarded to individuals for their outstanding contributions to Scouting. The award is available in various levels, each representing a different age group and level of achievement.
Commissioner Commendation Award	Commissioner's Commendation Award	Year	The Commissioners Commendation Award in the UK is a local award used to recognize individuals, including youth members, adult members, and non-members, for their contributions to Scouting.
Chief Scout's Length of Service Awards	Length of Service Decoration	Year	The Chief Scout's Length of Service Awards in the UK are presented to recognize the significant contributions of adult members to the Scout Association. These awards are given at intervals of 5, 10, 15, 20, 25, 30, 40, 50, 60, and 70 years of service.

== World Organization of the Scout Movement ==
Insignia	Title	Started	Description
Bronze Wolf Award	Bronze Wolf Award	1935	The World Organization of the Scout Movement offers only one award to scouters, the Bronze Wolf Award and it is considered the highest honor that can be bestowed on an adult scout leader throughout the world. There is approximately one award given for every 2,000,000 scouts. A rare variation of this is the Gold Wolf Award, a unique distinction that has been awarded only three times. First in 1917 to Prince Arthur, Duke of Connaught, by Lord Robert Baden-Powell. Second, in 1953, to Her Majesty Queen Elizabeth II, in recognition of her patronage of The Scout Association in the United Kingdom. Finally, in 2026 to His Majesty King Carl XVI Gustaf of Sweden, for five decades as Honorary Chairman of the World Scout Foundation and tireless commitment to Scouting.
