= Green Scouting =

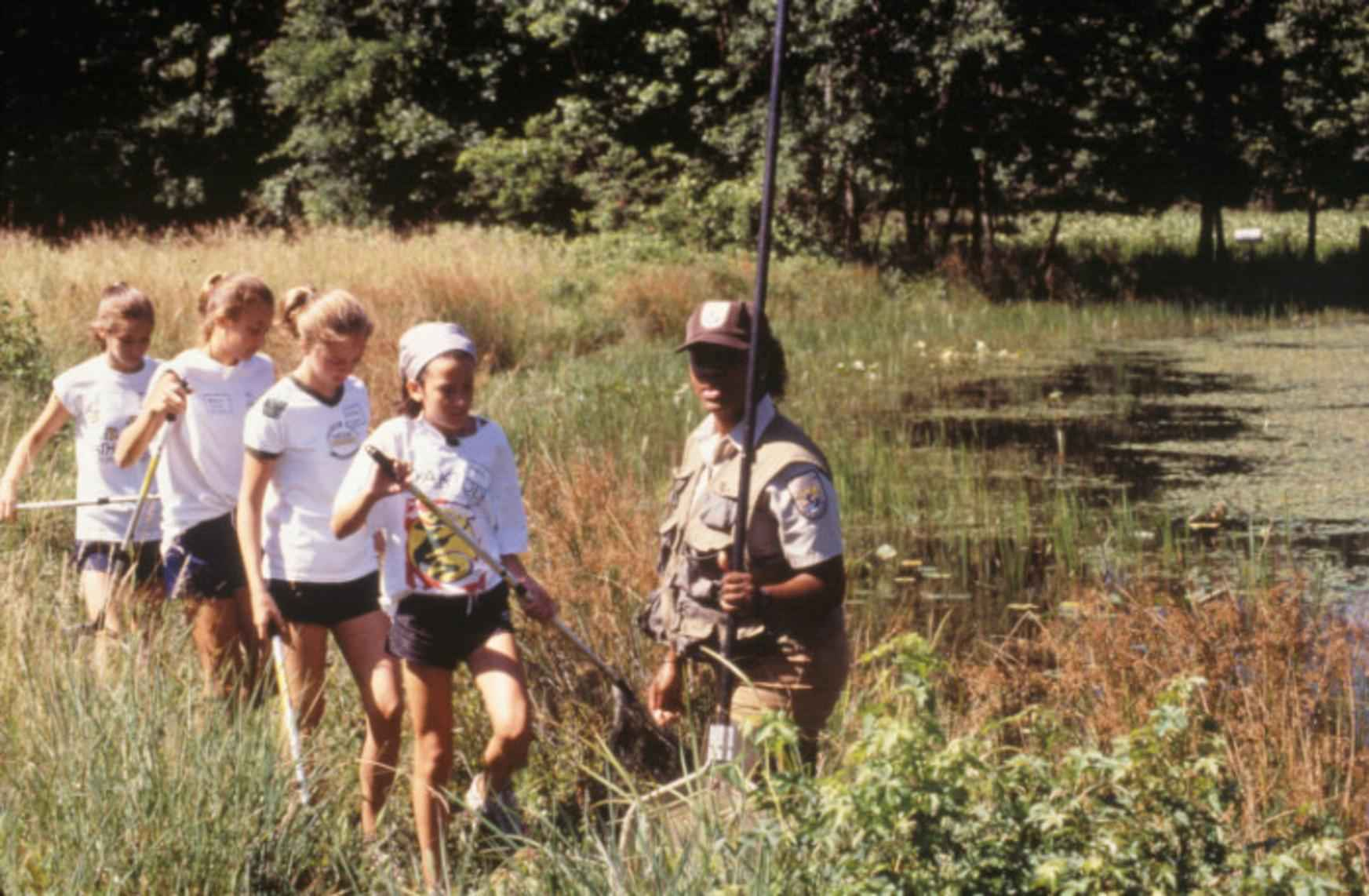
- Maryland Girl Scouts in frog survey

Green Scouts have been formed in several countries, with a focus on protection of the environment. Some have been linked to Greens parties. Environmentally-minded Scouts have existed since the very earliest days of the Scout Movement.

== Background ==
In 1912, following a rash of devastating fires in the late nineteenth and early twentieth centuries, the State of Michigan established a group of Boy Scouts called the Michigan Forest Scouts. A similar group, with nearly identical badges, was later established in the State of New York. The Forest Scouts did not have merit badges or rank badges and their emphasis was on protecting the state's forests and they were auxiliaries to fire wardens. In a Boy Scouts of America annual report, the Forest Scouts are mentioned with approval and a note is made that "the groups are headed up by Boy Scout men and that the Forest Scouts and the Boy Scouts of America are closely affiliated."

Tenzin Gyatso, 14th Dalai Lama has had direct involvement with Green Scouting on at least two occasions and, on September 3 1999, he was made a patron of the Global Movement of Green Scouts in New Delhi, India.

Scout organizations in Niger include the Association Nigerienne des Scouts de l'Environnement (ANSEN), founded in 2003, which seems to have UN accreditation.

Many Scout organizations issue an environment badge, e.g. World Conservation Award.

== Opposition to Green Scouts ==
The Scout Movement is a pluralist movement, not a single organization. One international Scout organization, the World Organization of the Scout Movement has attempted to disuade involvement with Green Scout organizations, as it does with any non-member Scout organization. It has opposed the use of the words "Scout" and "Boy Scout" by Green Scout organizations and attempted to influence international governmental and non-governmental organizations involved with the environment, such as the United Nations' Environment Program and the World-Wide Fund for Nature., stating:

"There is room for all in the fight to protect nature and the environment,... but there is no room for creating confusion between that fight and the broader purposes of an established educational organization such as World Scouting and its duly authorized member associations around the globe." (Jacques Moreillon, WOSM Secretary General in the 1990s).

The statement represented the Scout Movement to be "an ... organization" with "duly authorized member associations"

== See also ==
- Traditional Scouting
- Green party
