= Summit Award =

Rank in Scouting America

Venturing Summit Rank
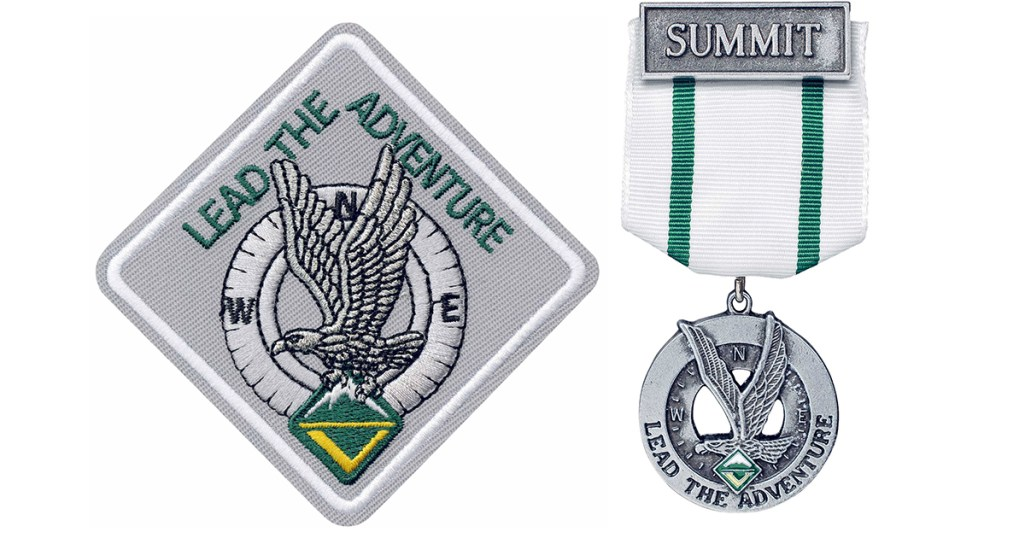
- Cloth Patch & Medal
- Owner: Scouting America
- Country: United States
- Founded: June 1, 2014

The Venturing Summit is the highest rank for youth in the Venturing program of Scouting America. It requires Venturers to earn the Pathfinder Rank, participate in adventures, and demonstrate leadership, service and personal growth.

== Rank ==
This rank consists of three elements: a badge, a medal and a knot insignia.

The badge is a rotated square cloth patch, with the Venturing Summit rank emblem and the words LEAD THE ADVENTURE above. The badge is worn on the left pocket by youth have earned the rank

The medal is an antique silver colored roundel with the words LEAD THE ADVENTURE in the border. The inner border is inscribed with a compass rose. Superimposed on the roundel is a silver eagle in flight with the Venturing emblem below. The medal is suspended from a white ribbon with green stripes; the ribbon is suspended from an antique silver colored bar bearing the word SUMMIT. The design incorporates elements from the Exploring Silver Medal (Type II) issued between 1954 and 1965. The medal is worn on formal occasions, such as a Court of Honor.

The square knot insignia is a rectangular cloth patch with a silver knot and border on a green and white background. This is the same knot previously used for the Silver Award. The knot is to be worn above the left pocket by adults who achieved the Summit award while they were a youth. No youth can wear this knot on any uniform, instead they wear the rank patch and/or the medal.

== History ==
The Summit Award replaced the Silver Award on June 1, 2014, with the Silver Award discontinued as of December 31, 2014. The first presentation of the Summit Award was on February 16, 2015, by former BSA National President, Wayne Perry.

In August 2020 the Venturing Summit Award was formally recognized as a Rank that Venturers can earn through a series of requirements.

== Requirements ==
Adventure

1. Participate in at least three additional (for a total of seven) Tier II or Tier III adventures at the crew, district, council, area, regional, or national level. To earn the Summit Award, a Venturer must have participated in at least one Tier III adventure and served as a leader during one adventure.

Leadership

2. Complete BSA Mentoring Training prior to initiating mentoring relationships.
3. Since earning the Pathfinder Award, mentor another Venturer in the planning and implementation of a crew, council, area, regional, or national Venturing activity (see Summit Adventure requirement 1). Work with the youth enough to ensure he or she is ready to lead and has organized the appropriate resources, is prepared for contingencies, and has developed an itinerary, conducted training to support the adventure, and mitigated risk before and during the adventure. Participate in the adventure and provide feedback on how the adventure was conducted.
4. Complete two of the following.
  1. Since earning the Pathfinder Award, serve actively as your crew president, vice president, secretary, treasurer, guide, historian, den chief, or quartermaster for a period of at least six months. At the beginning of your term, work with your crew president (or Advisor, if you are the president) to set performance goals for the position. Any number of different positions may be held as long as the total length of service equals at least six months. Holding simultaneous positions does not shorten the required number of months. Positions need not flow from one to the other; there may be gaps in time. Once during your term of office, discuss your successes and challenges with your crew president (or Advisor, if you are the president). (Note: Venturers may substitute district, council, area, regional, or national Venturing officer or cabinet positions for the positions listed in this requirement.)
  2. Participate in or serve on staff for leadership training such as National Youth Leadership Training, Kodiak Challenge, National Advanced Youth Leadership Experience, Order of the Arrow National Leadership Seminar, Sea Scout SEAL Training, or Wood Badge (for Venturers 18 or older). You may also participate in non-BSA leadership training courses such as those delivered by the National Outdoor Leadership School, if approved by your Advisor. This must be a different training course than you completed for Pathfinder Award requirement 4b or Summit Award requirement 4c.
  3. Lead the delivery of Introduction to Leadership Skills for Crews for members of your Venturing crew or another local Venturing crew or for a local district or council training event. After leading the training course, discuss with your crew Advisor how you believe you helped build the skill set of your crew and what you learned by organizing the training course.

Service

5. Since earning the Pathfinder Award, plan, develop, and give leadership to others in a service project helpful to a religious institution, school, or community. (The project must benefit an organization other than the Boy Scouts of America.) Before you start, a project proposal must be approved by the organization benefiting from the effort, your Advisor, the unit committee, and the council or district advancement committee (per local practices).

Personal growth

6. Since earning the Pathfinder Award, complete a structured personal reflection. Use this reflection to prepare for goal setting and as part of your Advisor conference. Explore two of the following realms: "Adventures of Faith," (Note: A Venturer is not required to share the personal reflection associated with "Adventures of Faith" with his or her Advisor or members of a board of review, including the discussion that takes place at the Advisor conference or the board of review.) "Adventures of Self," or "Adventures of Others." You may explore one of the realms twice or select from between two different realms.
7. Create a personal code of conduct. This code of conduct should be guided by your explorations in the realms of faith, self, and others.
8. Since earning the Pathfinder Award, lead an ethical controversy and conflict resolution scenario with members of your Venturing crew.
9. Participate in an Advisor conference. As a part of this conference, share your code of conduct with your Advisor, and explain how your explorations of faith, self, and others, and your goal-setting exercises, influenced the development of your code.
10. After your Advisor conference, successfully complete a crew board of review. Once that is completed, the crew advisor must submit the Summit Rank application to the local council by email.

== Silver Award ==
Silver Award
- Medal and knot
- Owner: Boy Scouts of America
- Country: United States
- Created: 1998
- Defunct: December 31, 2014

The Silver Award was the highest award in the Venturing program of the Boy Scouts of America from 1998 through 2014. It required Venturers to first earn one of five Bronze Awards, earn the Gold Award, have one year's tenure in a crew, and fulfill requirements relating to emergency preparedness, leadership skills, and ethics-in-action. The Silver Award was replaced by the Summit Award starting in 2014 and was discontinued on January 1, 2015.

=== Award ===
The award consisted of a medal suspended from a white ribbon with green stripes; the ribbon is suspended from an antique silver colored bar bearing the word VENTURING. The medal is an antique silver colored roundel with red, white and blue enameled stripes, the universal Boy Scout logo at the top with a superimposed eagle in flight, and the words VENTURING SILVER in the border.

Recipients may wear the corresponding square knot insignia, with a silver knot and border on a green and white background on the BSA uniform.

=== Origins ===
The original Silver Award was first issued from 1949 to 1954 as part of the BSA's Explorer program. The award was restyled in 1954 and awarded through 1958 when Explorer was renamed to Exploring and advancement was dropped. Air Explorers continued to be able to earn this award through 1964. A total of 18,047 Explorers earned the Silver Award between 1949 and 1958.

The award was re-introduced in 1998 as part of Venturing and its current design is similar to its historic counterpart.

=== Purpose ===
The purpose of the Silver Award was to:

- Provide a pathway for personal development.
- Encourage Venturers to learn, grow and serve.
- Recognize the high level of achievement of Venturers who acquire Venturing skills.
- Identify trained and highly motivated Venturers who will be a training, leadership, and program resource for other Venturers, Scouts, organizations, and the community.
- Help define Venturing.

== Highest awards in other programs ==
The highest awards in other BSA membership divisions are the Cub Scouting Arrow of Light, the Scouts BSA Eagle Scout, the Sea Scouting Quartermaster Award, and the Varsity Scouting Denali Award. Using the United States Military as the model, silver awards are higher than gold awards in the BSA. Other Scouting movements have similar programs and awards.

== See also ==
- Advancement and recognition in Scouting America
