= 50-Miler Award =

Award of Scouting America

- Owner: Scouting America
- Country: United States
- Created: 1956
- Awarded for: Completion of a 50-mile (80 km) trek and a conservation service project
- Website https://www.scouting.org/awards/awards-central/50-miler/

The 50-Miler Award is an award of Scouting America designed to promote the ideals of Scouting, Scoutcraft, conservation, self-reliance, and physical fitness. The award may be earned by Scouts, Venturers, and Scout leaders. The 50-Miler Award was established in April 1956, along with the Historic Trails Award.

== Award ==
The previous award patch

The 50-Miler Award is presented as a cloth or leather patch and as a decal. Currently, the award patch features a horseshoe and bike wheel, while the previous version included only a hiking boot and paddle. The patch may not be worn on the uniform but is affixed to backpacks or sewn onto items such as patch vests or blankets. A hiking staff shield may also be purchased.

== Requirements ==
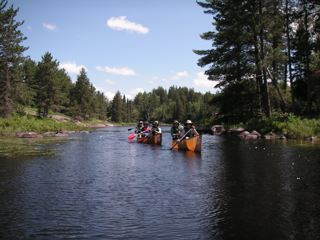
Scouts earning the 50-Miler Award in the Boundary Waters Canoe Area Wilderness in Minnesota

Although the 50-Miler is an individual award, the requirements are performed as a group. Groups may be the troop, team, crew, or an ad hoc group made of members of various units. The trip must be properly planned and may include other opportunities for advancement and recognition. The group must travel a minimum of 50 miles (80 km) on land and/or water in a minimum of five consecutive days. Travel may be by foot, bicycle, canoe, horse, or sailboat. No travel may involve any motorized vehicle. The group must also complete ten hours of conservation work. If ten hours of work cannot be completed on the trail, similar work may be done in the group's home area. The unit leader must file an application at their local council's service center regardless of whether the requirements were completed at a National Jamboree or High Adventure base.
