= Totin' Chip =

Scouts BSA Award

- Totin' Chip temporary patch
- Country: United States
- Created: 1950
- Founders: John Page, Yawgoog Scout Reservation
- Awarded for: Demonstrate knowledge of and proper handling, care, and use of the pocket knife, axe, and saw.

The Totin' Chip is an award in Scouts BSA that shows a Scout understands and agrees to certain principles of using different tools with blades. It can be physically represented by a patch or a small paper card. With this, a Scout has the right to carry and use woods tools. A Scout must demonstrate to their Scout leader, or someone designated by their leader, that they understand the responsibility.

== Background ==
This certification grants a Scout the right to carry and use woods tools. The Scout must show their Scout leader, or someone designated by their leader, that the Scout understands their responsibility to do the following:

Basic safety rules and requirements for this recognition are:

1. Read and understand woods tools use and safety rules from the Scouts BSA handbooks.
2. Demonstrate proper handling, care, and use of the pocketknife, ax, and saw.
3. Use knife, ax, and saw as tools, not playthings.
4. Respect all safety rules to protect others.
5. Respect property. Cut living and dead trees only with permission and good reason.
6. Subscribe to the Outdoor Code.

The Scout's "Totin' Rights" can be taken away if they fail in their responsibility. A Totin' Chip is required for the Woodcarving merit badge.

Although the patch is shaped like a pocket flap, it is not to be worn on the pocket flap. It may be worn as a temporary patch on the right pocket.

== See also ==
- Firem'n Chit, a similar award which allows the Scout to build and light campfires, as well as carry matches.
