= Scouting and Guiding in Niger =

Scouting and Guiding associations in Niger

The Scout and Guide movement in Niger is served by

- the Association des Scouts du Niger, member of the World Organization of the Scout Movement
- the Association nigerienne des scouts de l'environnement (non-aligned) (ANSEN), founded in 2003, which seems to have UN accreditation
- the Mouvement des Guides et Eclaireuses du Niger, member of the World Association of Girl Guides and Girl Scouts
