= Historic Trails Award =

Award of Scouting America

- Owner: Scouting America
- Country: United States
- Created: 1956
- Awarded for: Studying, hiking or camp along, and performing a service project for a historic trail
- Website http://www.scouting.org/awards/awards-central/historic-trails/

The Historic Trails Award is an award of Scouting America designed to promote the ideals of Scouting, Scoutcraft, citizenship, self-reliance, and appreciation of national history. It is awarded for studying, hiking or camping along, and performing a service project for a historic trail. The award may be earned by Cub Scouts, Scouts, Sea Scouts, Venturers and Scout Leaders. The Historic Trails Award was established in April 1956, along with the 50-Miler Award.

== Award ==
The Historic Trails Award is presented as a cloth or leather patch and as a decal. The award may not be worn on the uniform but is affixed to equipment such as backpacks or sewn onto items such as patch vests or blankets.

== Requirements ==
Although the Historic Trails Award is an individual award, the requirements are performed as a group, where groups may be the pack, troop, ship, or crew or a provisional group composed of members of various units. The trip must be properly planned and may include other opportunities for advancement and recognition.
