= Quartermaster Award (Boy Scouts of America) =

Sea Scouting award

- Medal, badge, and knot
- Country: United States
- Founder: Scouting America

The Quartermaster Award is the highest rank attainable in the Sea Scouting program of the Scouting America.

== Award ==
The Quartermaster Award represents excellence and achievement of the highest rank in Sea Scouts. The award includes a medal suspended from a blue ribbon and a bar depicting the carrick bend. The medal incorporates a ship's wheel, compass, Sea Scout emblem, each representing elements of Sea Scouts and Scouting ideals.

The award's design is symbolic. The carrick bend represents holding fast to one's ideals; the blue ribbon represents loyalty to country; the compass represents the importance of choosing one's direction in life; and the ship's wheel represents responsibility of guiding one's future. The Scout badge represents the connection between Sea Scouts and the broader Scouting tradition while the anchor represents Duty to God.

The badge is a cloth patch bearing the wheel and compass emblem on a blue background with a silver border. Recipients may wear the corresponding square knot insignia, with a white knot on a blue background on the Scouting America Class A uniform.

== Requirements ==
After successfully completing and being awarded all previous Sea Scout ranks, Apprentice, Ordinary, and Able, the Sea Scout becomes a Quartermaster Candidate and may working towards the Quartermaster Award.

Quartermaster candidates are expected to master advanced seamanship, demonstrate leadership, teach other Sea Scouts, model Scouting ideals, and complete a major community service project.

- Ideals: Initiate a discussion on ideals stated in the Sea Promise and prepare a written analysis recommending recommending improvements to an aspect of the Ship's program.
- Active Membership: Meet the Ship's requirements for active participation in meetings and activities for six (6) months. Present a talk or program of at least fifteen (15) minutes on Sea Scouting to an outside organization.
- Leadership: After receiving the Able Rank, plan, develop, and lead a Quartermaster service project benefiting a religious institution, school, or community. The candidate must also serve as a ship officer for at least six (6) months and either help to conduct Introduction to Leadership Skills for Ships (ILSS) or serve on the staff of a qualifying Scouting leadership course.
- Seamanship and Other Skills: Complete the Quartermaster Requirements in ten (10) special skills required for Quartermaster, which include:
  - Swimming
  - Safety
  - Marlinspike Seamanship
  - Boat Handling
  - Ground Tackle
  - Navigation Rules
  - Piloting and Navigation
  - Weather
  - Environment
- Electives: Complete any four (4) Level Three Electives in: Leadership, Duty to God, Sailing, Paddling, Vessels, Racing, Engine, Vessel Maintenance, NauticEd, Rigging, SCUBA, Special Proficiency, Ornamental ropework, Maritime Traditions, the United States Coast Guard Auxiliary.

== Quartermaster Award Application and Bridge of Review ==
After completing the advancement requirements for Quartermaster, the Sea Scout must complete the official Quartermaster Award Application. As part of the application, the candidate provides references who can attest to the candidate's character and adherence to the Scout Oath and Scout Law. The application also requires certification from the ship's officers (Quarterdeck), ship committee, and Skipper.

The candidate then appears before a Quartermaster Bridge of Review. The Bridge of Review consists of three to six adults and is conducted in cooperation with the local council or district advancement committee. The candidate's Skipper, mates, relatives, and guardians may not serve as members of the Bridge of Review. The Skipper may introduce the candidate and remain during the review but does not participate in the review.

During the Bridge of Review, the candidate's advancement experience, leadership, service project, and understanding and application of the ideals of Scouting are reviewed. Upon successful completion, the Bridge of Review Chair and the Council or District Representative sign the Quartermaster Award Application

The completed application is then submitted to the local council for certification and approval by the Scout Executive. Following Council approval, the application is submitted to the National Council which confers the Quartermaster Award.

== Origins ==
The exact date on which the Quartermaster Award was introduced is unclear, although the first recorded Quartermaster was recognized in May 1929. The National Executive Board approved the Quartermaster badge on December 12, 1930. It cost $3.00. During the 1930s, Sea Scouting experienced significant growth and development, including revisions to its advancement program and training materials. By 1930, Sea Scout membership had reached 8,043 members.

In 1938, the National Sea Scouting Committee made extensive changes to the advancement requirements. In 1949, the program became known as Sea Exploring, and Sea Scouts became known as Sea Explorers; the Quartermaster Rank continued.

Year	Quartermaster Awards	Registered Sea Scouts
2015	37	
2014	37	
2013	39	
2012	33	
2011	39	
2010	28	
2009	20	
2008	12	
1966	82	18,210
1962	124	26,751

== Highest awards in other programs ==
The Quartermaster Award is the highest award in Sea Scouting. The highest awards in other BSA membership divisions are: Cub Scouting Arrow of Light, the Boy Scouts’ Eagle Scout and the Venturing Summit Award, Other Scouting movements and many non-Scouting organizations have similar programs and awards.
