= International Spirit Award =

Award of the Boy Scouts of America

- Country: United States
- Created: 2012
- Founder: Boy Scouts of America
- Awarded for: expanding knowledge of international Scouting

The emblem of the International Spirit Award is worn as a temporary patch by both youth and adult leaders in the Boy Scouts of America. The award recognizes those who have broadened their knowledge of international Scouting and increased their appreciation and awareness of different cultures and countries. This award replaces the International Activity Patch (1991-2012).

== Requirements ==
Requirements for the award vary for Scouters and Scouts of different ages.

- Cub Scouts (boys and girls in Grades K - 5) must earn the Cub Scout World Conservation Award, learn 10 words in a language different than their own, play two games that originated in another country or culture, participate in Jamboree on the Air or Jamboree on the Internet, organize a World Friendship Fund collection, and complete two of the ten experience requirements listed below.
- Boy Scouts, Varsity Scouts, and Venturers must earn the World Conservation Award, earn the Citizenship in the World merit badge or complete the "understanding other cultures" requirement of the TRUST award, participate in Jamboree on the Air or Jamboree on the Internet and complete three of the ten experience requirements listed below.
- Scouters must learn about the World Organization of the Scout Movement and explain it to their colleagues, promote at least two items from the most current newsletter from the International Department, help organize two Jamboree on the Air or Jamboree on the Internet events, and complete four of the ten experience requirements listed below.
- Experience requirements: (1) Host an international Scout, (2) prepare a dinner traditionally served in another country, (3) participate in an international Scout event, (4) take a trip to another country, (5) organize a Messengers of Peace project, (6) earn the Interpreter Strip, (7) present information about Scouting in another country to a group, (8) help your council’s international representative with at least two items, (9) research and present information on obtaining a U.S. passport, (10) present information about a region of the World Organization of the Scout Movement to a group.

== International Activity Patch ==
International Activity Patch
- Country: United States
- Created: 1991
- Defunct: 2012
- Founder: Boy Scouts of America
- Awarded for: Participation in an international event

The International Activity Patch is a former award of the Boy Scouts of America for participation in an international event. Requirements were developed by each council.

The award was a three-inch circular cloth patch worn on the right pocket of the official uniform as a temporary insignia. The emblem is the universal emblem of the BSA encircled by a rope tied in a square knot on a field of blue. The rope and knot are taken from the emblem of the World Scout Emblem, the symbol of the World Organization of the Scout Movement. A five-inch "back patch" for wear on the back of the official jac-shirt and a neckerchief were also available.

=== Origins ===
The BSA used the World Scout Emblem— called the World Crest in the U.S. —as an award for international activities from 1956 on. Policy was changed in 1991 and the World Crest can now be worn by all members as an emblem of worldwide Scouting. The International Activity Patch replaced the World Crest as an award.

In 2012, the International Activity Patch was replaced by the International Spirit Award with specific requirements for each age level.
