= Association des Scouts du Niger =

National Scouting organization of Niger

- Scouts Association of Niger
- Country: Niger
- Founded: 1993
- Membership: 3,202
- National Commissioner: Mahamadou Issa Daouda
- Affiliation: World Organization of the Scout Movement
- Website https://web.archive.org/web/20080927225730/http://www.scout-niger.org/

The Association des Scouts du Niger (in Hausa language Iskutun Niger and Zarma language Nizer Skutey) is the national Scouting organization of Niger. It was founded in 1993 and became a member of the World Organization of the Scout Movement in 1996. The coeducational Association des Scouts du Niger has 3,202 members as of 2011.

== History ==
Scouting in Niger was started in 1947 under the auspices of French Scouting. The movement was disbanded by the military regime in the 1970s. In 1993, the Roman Catholic Church and the National Directory for the Youth restarted Scouting, supported by the Scouts de France. The Association became a member of the World Organization of the Scout Movement in 1996.

== Program ==
=== Activities ===
Scouts in Niger are active in the Africa Region and attend many International Scout camps and Jamborees with their African neighbors. One Scout attended the 19th World Scout Jamboree in Chile in 1998 as part of the West Africa contingent.

Faced with the 2005-06 Niger food crisis, in May 2005, the government of Niger issued a call for national and international solidarity in a bid to offer help to nearly 3.6 million in distress. In order to participate in the national solidarity efforts, the Association des Scouts du Niger appealed to the international Scout fraternity, through a project dubbed Scouts du Niger contre la faim (Scouts of Niger Against Hunger), funded by Lëtzebuerger Guiden a Scouten. In addition, UNFPA had recourse to the Scouts of Niger for the implementation of a project of food distribution to pregnant and breastfeeding women in the Agadez and Zinder areas. According to the Chief Commissioner, Yazi Oumarou, with the support from Guides et Scouts du Luxembourg, food (sorghum and millet) was bought and stored to be resold at an affordable price, to the population of the catchment area. Scouts were involved in gardening in plots with access to water, that were given out by the local authorities. After harvesting, Scouts sold the produce to their communities.

=== Sections ===
The association is divided in three sections according to age:

- Louveteaux (Cub Scouts) - ages 8 to 12
- Eclaireurs (Scouts - ages 13 to 17
- Routiers (Rover Scouts) - ages 18 to 25.

=== Ideals ===
The Scout Motto is Sois Prêt in French.

== See also ==
- Guides du Niger
- Scouting in Niger
