= World Conservation Award =

Conservation award provided by national scout associations

- World Conservation Award emblem
- Owner: World Organization of the Scout Movement

Boy Scouts of America

Cub Scout World Conservation Award
Boy Scout World Conservation Award
Venturing World Conservation Award

The World Conservation Award is issued by many of the national Scout associations affiliated to the World Organization of the Scout Movement, and was created in conjunction with the World Wide Fund for Nature, partially in response to the rise in popularity of Green Scouting, at some time prior to 1977. Different countries have set different standards or criteria in order for Scouts to receive this award.

== Boy Scouts of America ==
In the Boy Scouts of America, the World Conservation Award is presented at three levels:

- Cub Scouting: The requirements differ by rank, but Cub Scouts at all levels must learn about nature and participate in a den or pack conservation project. Webelos Scouts must earn the Forester, Naturalist, and Outdoorsman activity badges and take part in a den or pack conservation project. The Cub Scout World Conservation Award uses the panda emblem on a gold background with a blue border.
- Boy Scouting: by earning the Environmental Science merit badge, either Soil and Water Conservation or Fish and Wildlife Management merit badge, and Citizenship in the World merit badge. The Boy Scout World Conservation Award uses the panda emblem on a tan background with a tan border.
- Venturing: by earning the Ecology elective of the Ranger Award and by showing and teaching about environmental relationships. The Venturing World Conservation Award uses the panda emblem on a yellow background with a green border.

The award is worn centered on the right pocket of the uniform shirt as a temporary patch.

== See also ==
- List of environmental awards
