= Outstanding Eagle Scout Award =

Distinguished service award

NESA Outstanding Eagle Scout Award
- Medal and Eagle Scout square knot emblem with NOESA device
- Owner: Scouting America
- Country: United States
- Created: 2010
- Awarded for: An Eagle Scout who has achieved eminence at the local, state or regional level through distinguished service to their profession and community
- Recipients: 3585 (2011–2022)

The NESA Outstanding Eagle Scout Award (NOESA) is a distinguished service award of Scouting America. It is awarded to an Eagle Scout by the National Eagle Scout Association for distinguished service to their profession and community. The recipient must be recommended by their local council’s NESA committee, president, and Scout executive.

The Distinguished Eagle Scout Award (DESA) is a similar recognition, but requires a tenure of twenty-five years as an Eagle Scout. NOESA is not required for the DESA award, but DESA recipients may not subsequently receive the NOESA.

== Award ==
The award consists of a round silver medallion bearing an eagle in flight and the words "Scouting America NESA Outstanding Eagle Scout". The medallion is suspended from a blue neck ribbon. The recipient also receives a lapel pin miniature of the medallion and a square knot pin device for uniform wear. The recipient is also presented with a certificate.

== History ==
The NOESA was introduced during Scouting America’s 100th anniversary with the first awards being made by the National Eagle Scout Association upon the recommendation of local council NESA Committees. The award was created to recognize notable Eagle Scouts who had either performed their distinguished service closer to home (at the local, state, or regional level) or who were known nationally, but had not yet met the 25-year tenure as an Eagle requirement for the Distinguished Eagle Scout Award.

Year	Awards
2011	139
2012	193
2013	253
2014	326
2015	303
2016	337
2017	360
2018	386
2019	375
2020	331
2021	274
2022	308
2023	
2024	
2025	
Total	3585

== Recipients ==
The number of NOESA medals a council may present each calendar year is based upon the number of Eagle Scouts certified by the national office during the previous year. Each council may present two awards if there were between one and 100 new Eagle Scouts from that council the previous year, plus one additional award for every additional 100 Eagle Scouts or portion thereof. A council is not permitted to carry unused nominations into the next calendar year, nor to "borrow" from the next year's allotment.
