= Arrow of Light =

Highest rank in Cub Scouts program of Scouting America

- The Arrow of Light rank badge
- Owner: Scouting America
- Country: United States
- Founded: 1972

Arrow of Light (AOL) is the highest rank attainable in the Cub Scouts program of Scouting America. Introduced in 1972 as an award for Cub Scouts who remained in the scouting program, it has since become a separate rank of its own.

The Arrow of Light rank may be earned by fifth-grade members of the Cub Scout program. Requirements include completing at least eight adventures, six of which are mandatory for the award. Unlike Scouts BSA, where scouts must complete every rank before attaining Eagle Scout, all Cub Scouts who meet the program's membership requirements may earn the AOL rank.

== History ==
In 1941, the Webelos award was introduced to the program to recognize scouts who had excelled in the Cub Scout program and continued into Boy Scouts. The Lion rank was dropped in 1967 and replaced by the Webelos rank, and the Arrow of Light award was created in 1972 to fill the gap left by the Webelos award. In 2024, AOL was transitioned to a standalone rank for fifth graders, instead of an additional award.

== Requirements ==
To earn the Arrow of Light rank, the Cub Scout must complete six required adventures, two of sixteen elective adventures, and child abuse prevention exercises. The six required adventures are Bobcat, Outdoor Adventurer, Personal Fitness, Citizenship, First Aid, and Duty to God.

== Recognition ==
The Arrow of Light square knot worn by adults

Cub Scouts who earn the AOL rank receive a rectangular badge with a gold arrow design. Emanating from the arrow are seven rays, representing wisdom, courage, self-control, justice, faith, hope, and love. Cub Scout packs may also decide to recognize their AOLs with plaques or certificates. Adult Scouters with the AOL rank may wear a red and green square knot patch on their uniform.

Both Cub Scouts and Scouts wear the Arrow of Light badge below the left pocket. Adults wear the square-knot version of the badge above the left pocket.

== Progression to Scouts BSA ==
Earning the Arrow of Light allows a youth to join a Scouts BSA troop at ten years of age instead of eleven. The adventure requirements for AOL are shorter than those for the Webelos rank to accommodate for the fact that AOLs traditionally bridge to a Scouts BSA troop between January and March of their fifth-grade school year. The requirements for the AOL badge prepare the Cub Scouts for Scouts BSA without significantly repeating the requirements for the first rank in Scouts BSA, i.e. Scout. The AOL handbook incorporates pages from the Scouts BSA handbook for the Scout rank, so that families do not have to purchase two handbooks in the same year.

The Arrow of Light award is the only Cub Scout award that can be worn on the Scouts BSA uniform.
