= National Eagle Scout Association =

American youth organization

- Owner: Scouting America
- Country: United States
- Founded: 1972
- National President: Rich Pfaltzgraff
- Website www.nesa.org

The National Eagle Scout Association (NESA) is an organization of individuals who have earned the rank of Eagle Scout in Scouting America. NESA's stated objective is "to serve Eagle Scouts and, through them, the entire movement of Scouting."

== Origins ==
The Knights of Dunamis was an honor society of Eagle Scouts founded in San Francisco on April 19, 1925, by Scout Executive Raymond O. Hanson. The Knights of Dunamis, named after the Greek word for "strength", served as a service organization for local Scout councils and also hosted occasional social events. To gain admittance to the Knights of Dunamis (KD), the Eagle Scout had to participate in a significant service project, in addition to the project the Scout had to perform to gain his Eagle Scout award. The Knights awarded a special honor of their own, named the Knights Eagle Award. For about forty years after its founding, the national leadership of the BSA had an ambivalent attitude toward the Knights. From a peak of 110 chapters, there were only 37 chapters by 1971. In 1972, the Knights of Dunamis was merged into the BSA and became the National Eagle Scout Association.

== Programs ==
Membership is available on a five-year renewable or a lifetime basis to all Eagle Scouts. NESA cross-checks applications to ensure all applicants are Eagle Scouts. The Eagles' Call, known by its former names Eagle Scout Magazine and The Eagletter, is a quarterly magazine published by NESA that helps keep its members informed of NESA activities and functions.

== Scholarships ==
NESA administers several scholarships for Eagle Scouts both academic and merit.

Academic scholarships are based on school and Scouting participation, academic performance, and financial need. Applicants must score a minimum of 1290 SAT or 28 ACT to apply. These include a varying number of $5,000 NESA scholarships and a varying number of Mabel and Lawrence S. Cooke scholarships. The Mabel and Lawrence S. Cooke scholarships are awarded annually and include four $25,000 scholarships (payable at $6,250 per year) and one $48,000 scholarship (up to $12,000 payable for four years), as well as a varying number of others.

NESA offers an additional academic scholarship called the $50,000 NESA STEM scholarship (up to $12,500 payable for four years) to an applicant who plans to major in any field relating to science, technology, engineering, or mathematics.

The second type of NESA scholarship is the merit scholarship. Merit scholarships are based on school and Scouting participation, and community service. These awards comprise the $2,000 and $4,000 Bailey scholarships; the $2,500 Robert and Rebecca Palmer scholarships; and the $5,000 Hall/McElwain merit scholarships. Each BSA region reviews applications and awards a varying number of these scholarships to local Scouts.

NESA merit scholarship applicants must be Eagle Scouts graduating high school or undergraduate college students no farther than completion of the junior year. Recipients may receive the scholarship only once.

In 2018 NESA awarded approximately $750,000 in scholarships.

In addition, many of the Local Committees have smaller scholarship programs, and several specific scholarships are awarded by religious, civic/military groups and many colleges and universities. A complete list and application instructions can be found on NESA's website.

== Awards ==
Shortly after the National Eagle Scout Association was established in 1972, it began to make available a NESA Scoutmaster Award. The award was presented to one Scoutmaster per BSA area each year. These Scoutmasters' records demonstrated proper use of Boy Scout advancement, and a significant number of their Boy Scouts attained the Eagle Scout rank. This award was discontinued on December 31, 1987.

The president of the Boy Scouts of America requested that NESA convert its award into a Scoutmaster Award of Merit that could be earned by all Scoutmasters. The award used a white knot for uniform wear. His rationale was that there is a need for recognizing Scoutmasters relatively early in their work in that position before they qualify for the Scouter's Key. This was discontinued in 2009 and replaced by the Unit Leader's Award of Merit: no longer a NESA Award since it covers all of Scouting.

The Distinguished Eagle Scout Award (DESA) was created in 1969 and is awarded to an Eagle Scout for distinguished service in his profession and to his community for at least 25 years after attaining the rank of Eagle Scout. Other requirements include significant accomplishment in one's career and a solid record of continued community volunteer involvement. After 48 years, a total of 2,218 DESAs have been awarded through the end of 2017.

NESA Life Membership square knot

In 2008, NESA introduced a knot recognizing those Eagle Scouts who are life members of NESA: it uses the standard Eagle Scout square knot emblem with a silver border. It is worn in place of the standard knot; both knots should not be worn at one time.

The Glenn A. and Melinda W. Adams National Eagle Scout Service Project of the Year Award (ESSPY) was created in 2010 to "recognize valuable service of an exceptional nature by a Scout to a religious institution, a school, community, or other entity." It is presented at council, regional, and national levels.

The NESA Outstanding Eagle Scout Award (NOESA) was created in 2010 (and first awarded in 2011) to recognize Eagle Scouts who have demonstrated outstanding achievement at the local, state, or regional level. After 7 years, a total of 1,928 NOESAs have been awarded through the end of 2017.

The NESA Distinguished Service Award was created in 1976 "to recognize those who have given extraordinary leadership and service to NESA resulting in a significant impact on a national or regional level." 27 individuals received the award between 1976 and 1988 when it was discontinued. NESA reintroduced the award in 2020.

== Council committees ==
Local NESA committees may be formed at the council level to promote social activities and service opportunities. Committees often conduct Eagle Scout and Distinguished Eagle Scout recognition events and Scouting Alumni outreach.
