= Firem'n Chit =

Scouts BSA award

- Country: United States
- Created: 1950
- Founders: John Page, Camp Yawgoog
- Awarded for: Demonstrating knowledge and understanding of fire safety rules

The Firem'n Chit is a Scouts BSA award and contract, in the Boy Scouts of America program, stating that a Scout may be able to use, tend, and start a fire. Generally, the process to earn the Firem'n Chit takes about four hours.

== Requirements ==
In order to earn the Firem'n Chit, a Scout must prove to either their Scout leader or their designee that the Scout understands their responsibility to

1. Read and understand fire use and safety rules from the Boy Scout Handbook.
2. Build a campfire only when necessary and when having necessary permits (regulations vary by locality).
3. Minimize campfire impacts or use existing fire lays consistent with the principles of Leave No Trace. Check to see that all flammable material is cleared at least 5 feet in all directions from fire (total 10 feet).
4. Safely use and store fire starting materials.
5. See that fire is attended to at all times.
6. Make sure that water and/or a shovel is readily available. Promptly report any wildfire to the proper authorities.
7. Use the cold-out test to make sure the fire is cold out and make sure the fire lay is cleaned before leaving.
8. Follow the Outdoor Code, the Guide to Safe Scouting, and the principles of Leave No Trace and Tread Lightly!.

If the rules to tending or making a fire are not followed after any amount of given warnings, or none at all, then the Scoutmaster or senior patrol leader may revoke the privileges associated with the award.

Although the patch is shaped like a pocket flap, it is not to be worn on the pocket flap. It may be worn as a temporary patch on the right pocket.

== See also ==
- Totin' Chip
