= Powder Horn (Boy Scouts of America) =

High adventure training program

- Powder Horn medal
- Owner: Boy Scouts of America
- Country: United States
- Created: 1998
- Defunct: 2024

Powder Horn was a skills resource course for Venturing and Scouts BSA leaders and youth (age 14 and up) of the Boy Scouts of America (BSA). Powder Horn is also described as a "hands-on resource management course" designed to give Scouting leaders "the contacts and tools necessary to conduct an awesome high-adventure program" in their Scouting unit. The goals of Powder Horn were to help Scout leaders safely conduct outdoor activities of a fun and challenging nature, provide an introduction to the resources necessary to successfully lead youth through a program of high adventure, and familiarize participants with the skills involved in different high adventure disciplines. The Powder Horn course would also introduce Venturing leaders to the Ranger Award program, so adults may better help Venturers in meeting the requirements. Powder Horn presented a wide variety of hands-on high adventure skills experiences and thus was not designed to provide specific skills certifications. The course is meant to be held over a one-week period or two three-day weekends. Youth attendees would get first-hand experience and information as well as resources so they could better act as Event Chairs for their units.

== Logo ==
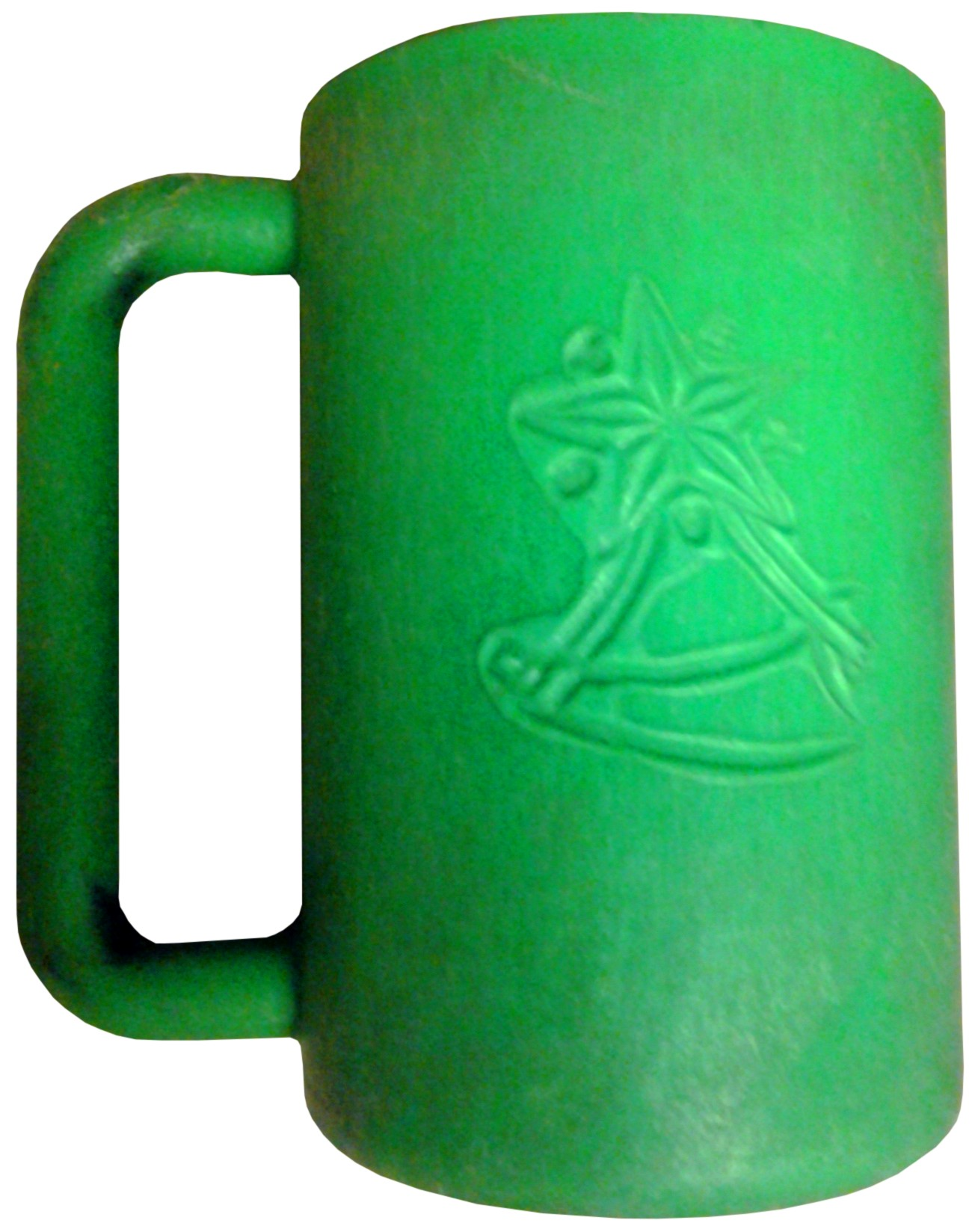
Texas Branded Mug

The official Powder Horn course logo is an old-fashioned pioneer's powder horn suspended from the BSA universal emblem.

=== State-specific logos ===
Some states may choose to create a custom Powder Horn logo, such as a Texas star suspending a powder horn.

== Origins ==
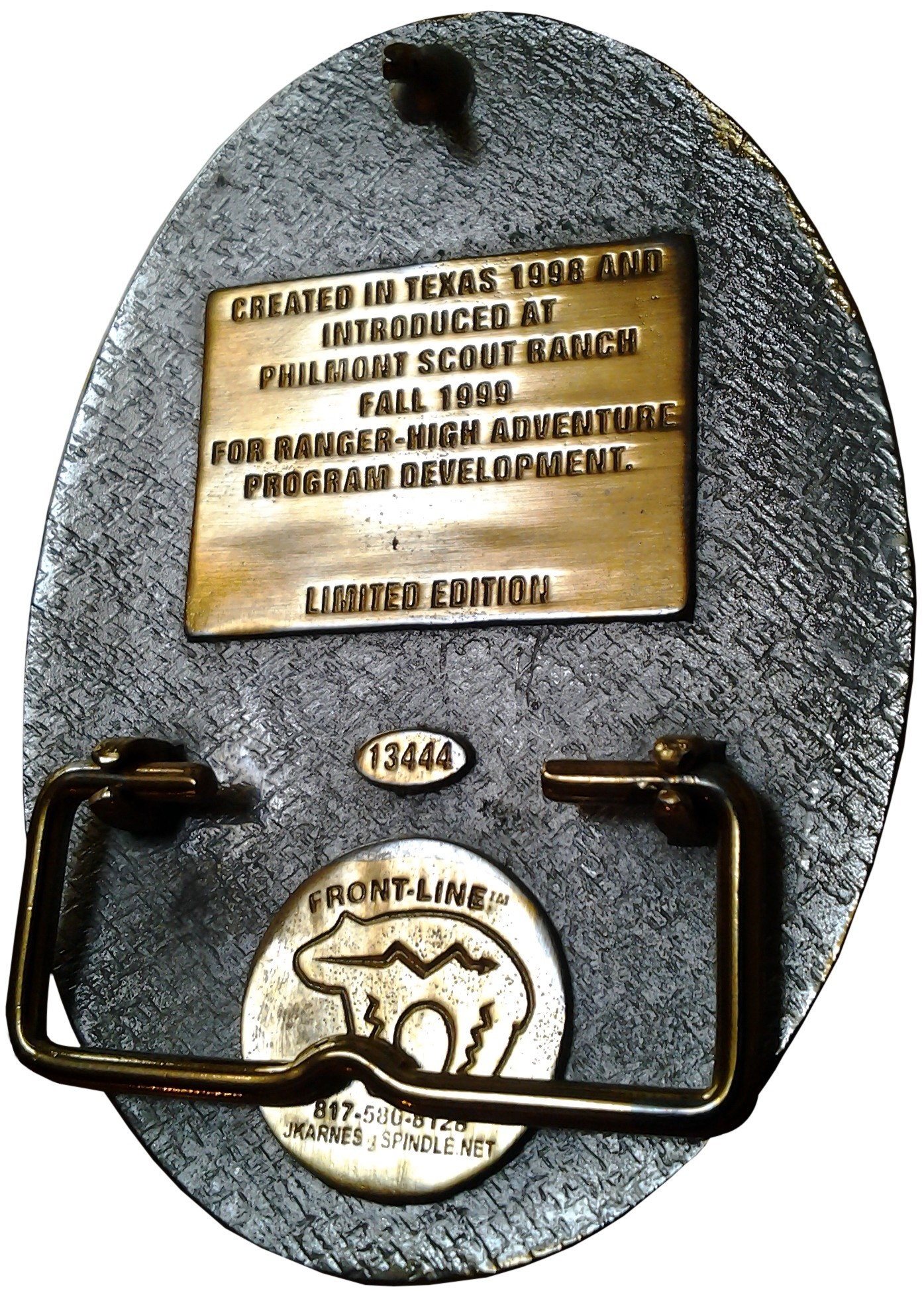
"Created in Texas 1998 and introduced at Philmont Scout Ranch fall 1999 for Ranger - High Adventure program development."

The Powder Horn course was initially created in the state of Texas in 1998, and subsequently presented at the Philmont Scout Ranch in the fall of 1999. The course was then rolled out to be run at region and area levels and was then offered by local councils. There was a Powder Horn Course Director Conference, usually held in each region at least once a year. Attendance at such a course was no longer mandatory for those who wish to conduct a Powder Horn course as a course director.

== Culture ==
The Powder Horn staff specifically promoted a custom-tailored Venturing-like Scouting leadership culture.

=== Crew method ===
Course participants were organized into numbered Crews, playing the role of Venturing youth. Each Crew was assigned a Crew Guide, an operational course staff member playing the role of an older Venturing youth. The Powder Horn course director was assigned to be the Venturing Advisor, and assistant course directors were assigned to be Associate Advisors, playing the roles of Venturing adult leaders.

=== Daily theme ===
Powder Horn course staff could choose to provide dress and activity themes on a day-by-day basis. Staff members and participants were encouraged to wear clothing or costumes matching each day's theme, and additional theme-related activities or food may be available. Possible themes included wild west cowboys, Area 51 aliens, and pirates.

=== Fun ===
An emphasis was placed on providing a relatively relaxed atmosphere, focused on fun and enjoyment of the many hands-on experiences presented.

== Gear ==
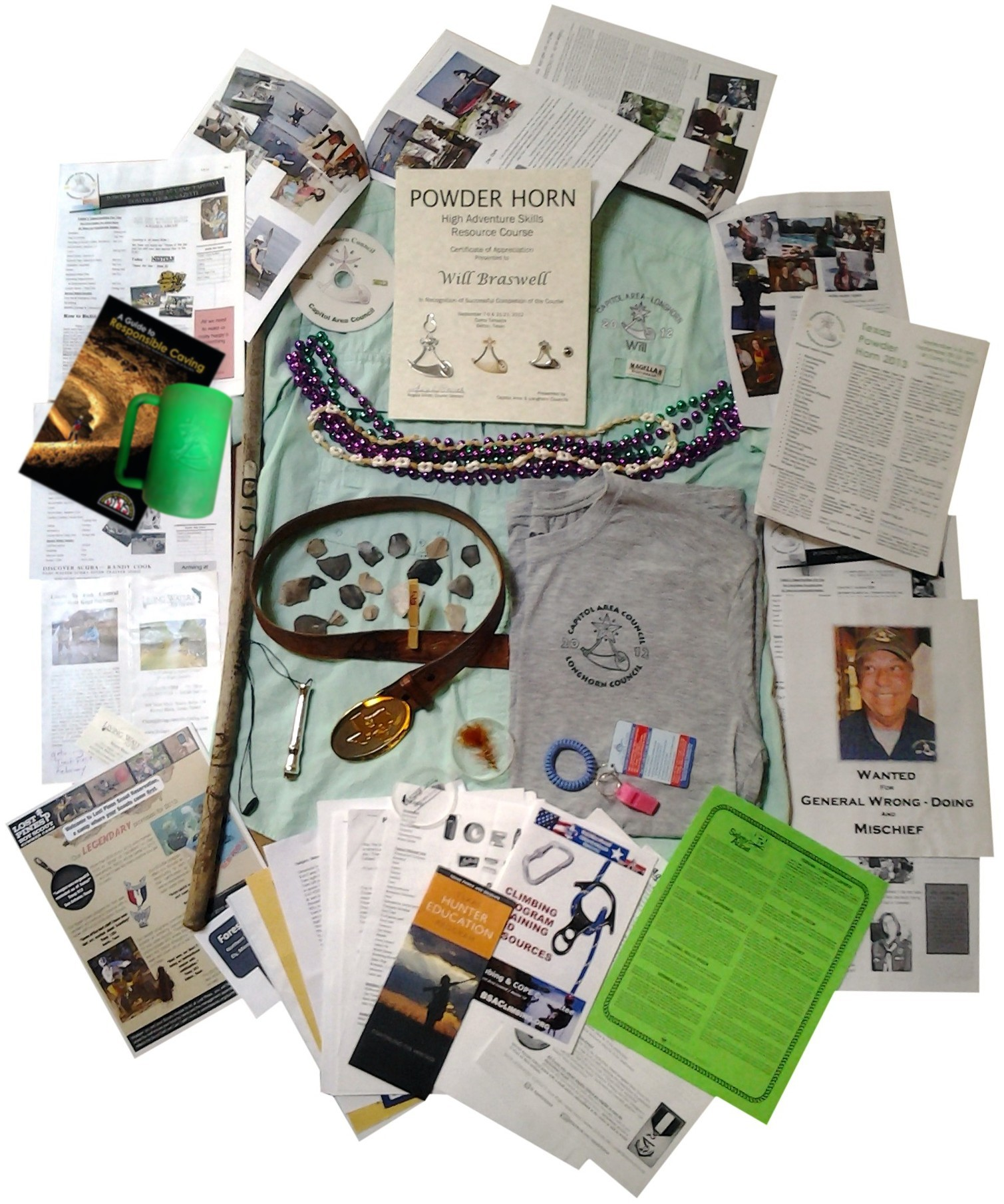
Miscellaneous gear

Like many other Scouting experiences, course participants had the opportunity to acquire multiple pieces of Powder Horn paraphernalia and documentation.

=== Certificate ===
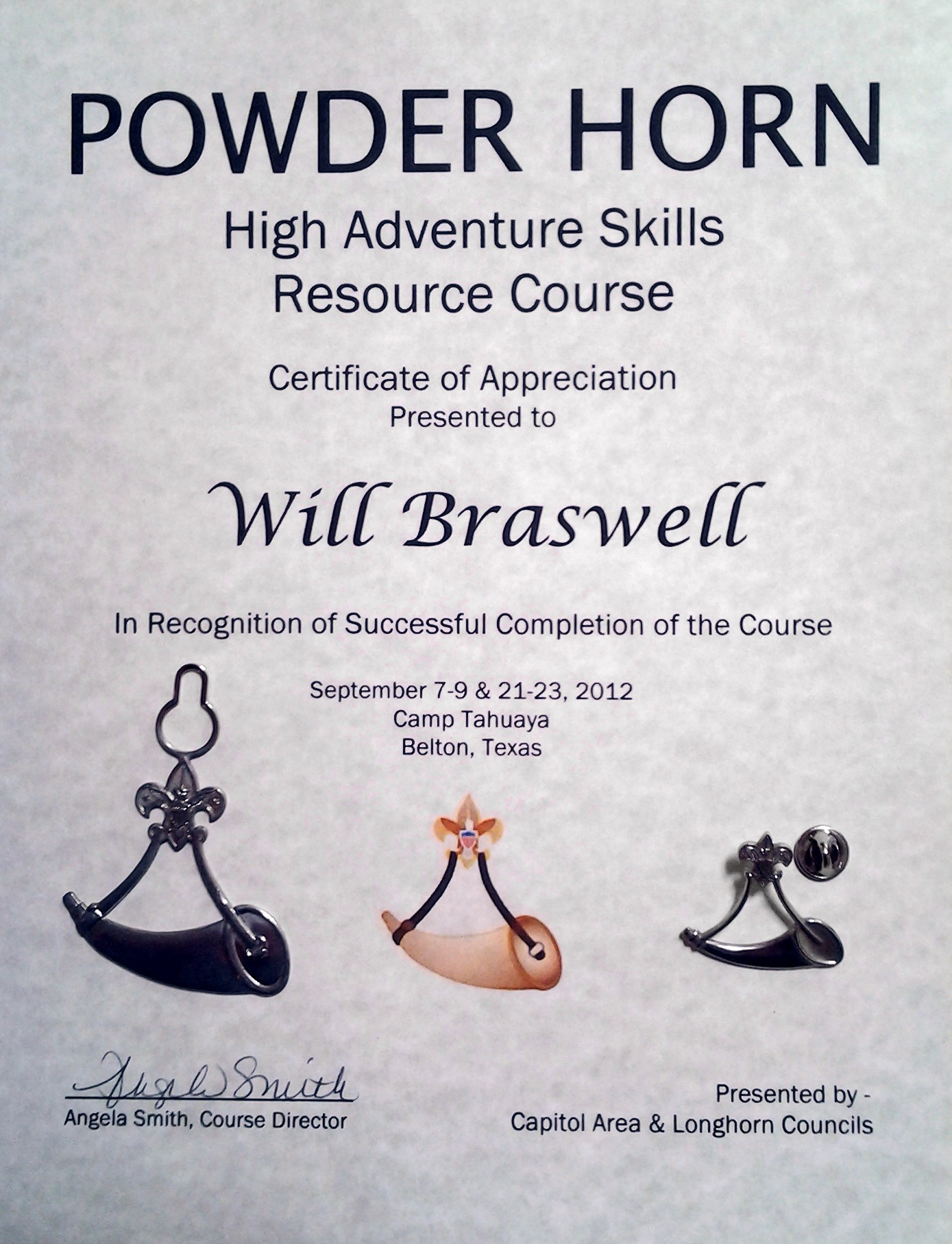
A Powder Horn recognition certificate, along with both the hanging medal and pin medal awards

Upon successful completion of the course, Powder Horn participants could be formally recognized with a certificate and medal. The certificate is suitable for framing.

=== Medals ===
The original Powder Horn medal consisted of the Powder Horn logo suspended from a button catch and hung from the button on the left breast pocket of a Scouting field uniform shirt.

The new Powder Horn medal consists of a smaller Powder Horn logo mounted on a pin with a butterfly military clutch as backing. The pin medal is worn on the left breast pocket flap in the same approximate location as the original hanging medal, near or above the pocket's button. Scouters may optionally choose to wear their pin medal as a device or hat pin, per applicable Scouting uniform regulations.

=== Nameplate ===
Some Powder Horn participants were provided a custom nameplate, suitable for wear on any Scouting uniform shirt.

=== Belt-buckle ===
Some Powder Horn participants were given the opportunity to purchase a variety of custom Powder Horn belt buckles, suitable for wear on any Scouting uniform belt.

=== Activity uniforms ===
Some Powder Horn participants were provided one or more custom Scouting shirts, with the possibility of additional shirts available for purchase.

== Skills ==
Each Powder Horn course provided an introduction to a variety of high adventure skills, limited only by what is available in the region where the course is being held.

Possible high adventure skills included:

- All-Terrain Vehicles
- Aquatics Lifesaving
- Backpacking
- Camping
- Canoeing
- Caving
- Climbing / Rappelling
- Project COPE / Ropes Course
- Expedition Planning
- Extreme Sports
- Geocaching
- First Aid
- Fishing
- Historical Reenactment / Living History
- Horsemanship
- Hunting
- Kayaking
- Leave No Trace
- Motorboating
- Mountain Biking
- Orienteering
- Personal Watercraft
- Sailing
- Search & Rescue
- Scuba Diving
- Shooting Sports / Archery
- Snorkeling
- Space Exploration
- Whitewater Rafting
- Wilderness Survival
- Winter Sports & Camping
- Zip-Line

== Gallery ==
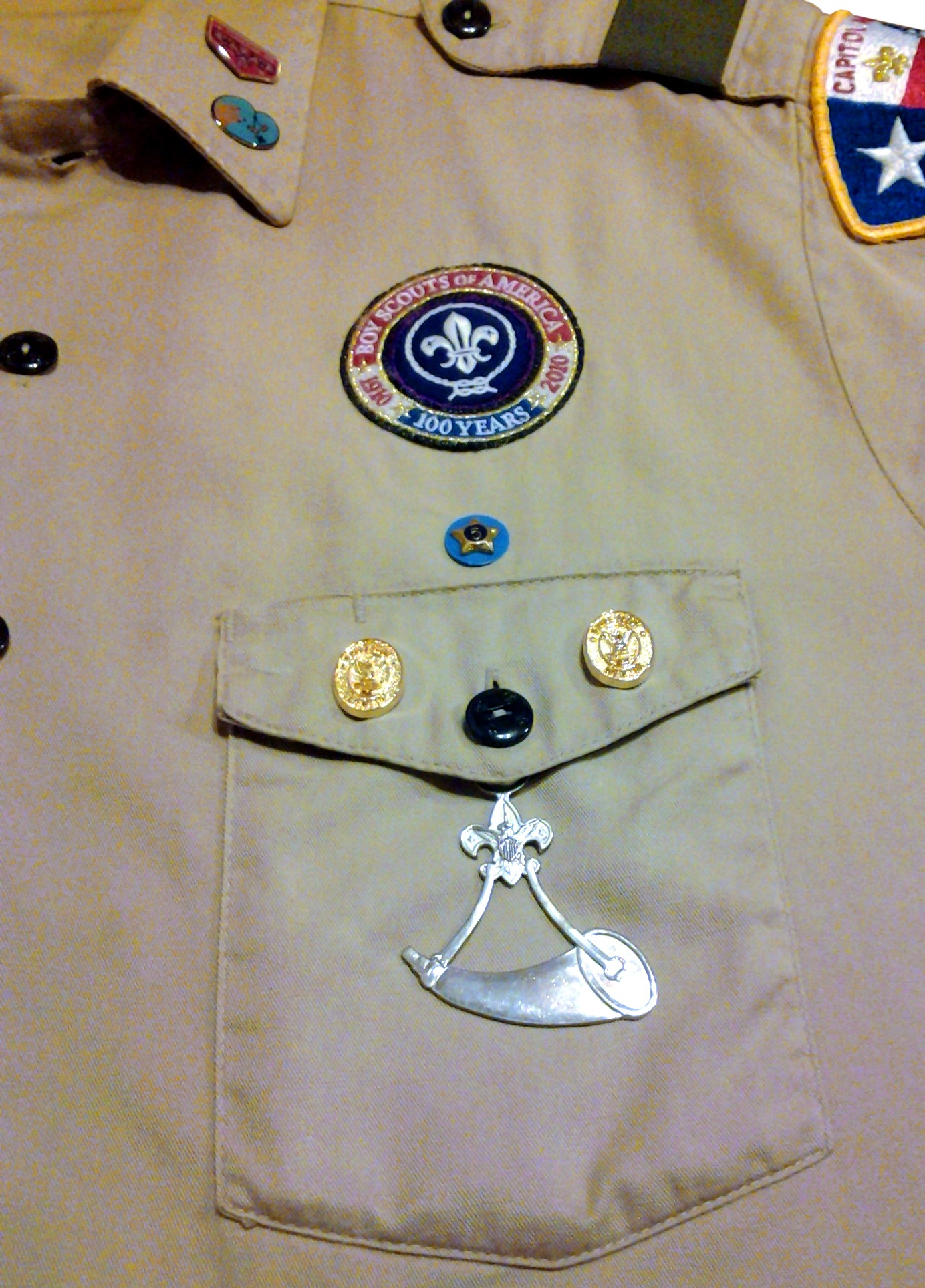
Hanging Medal

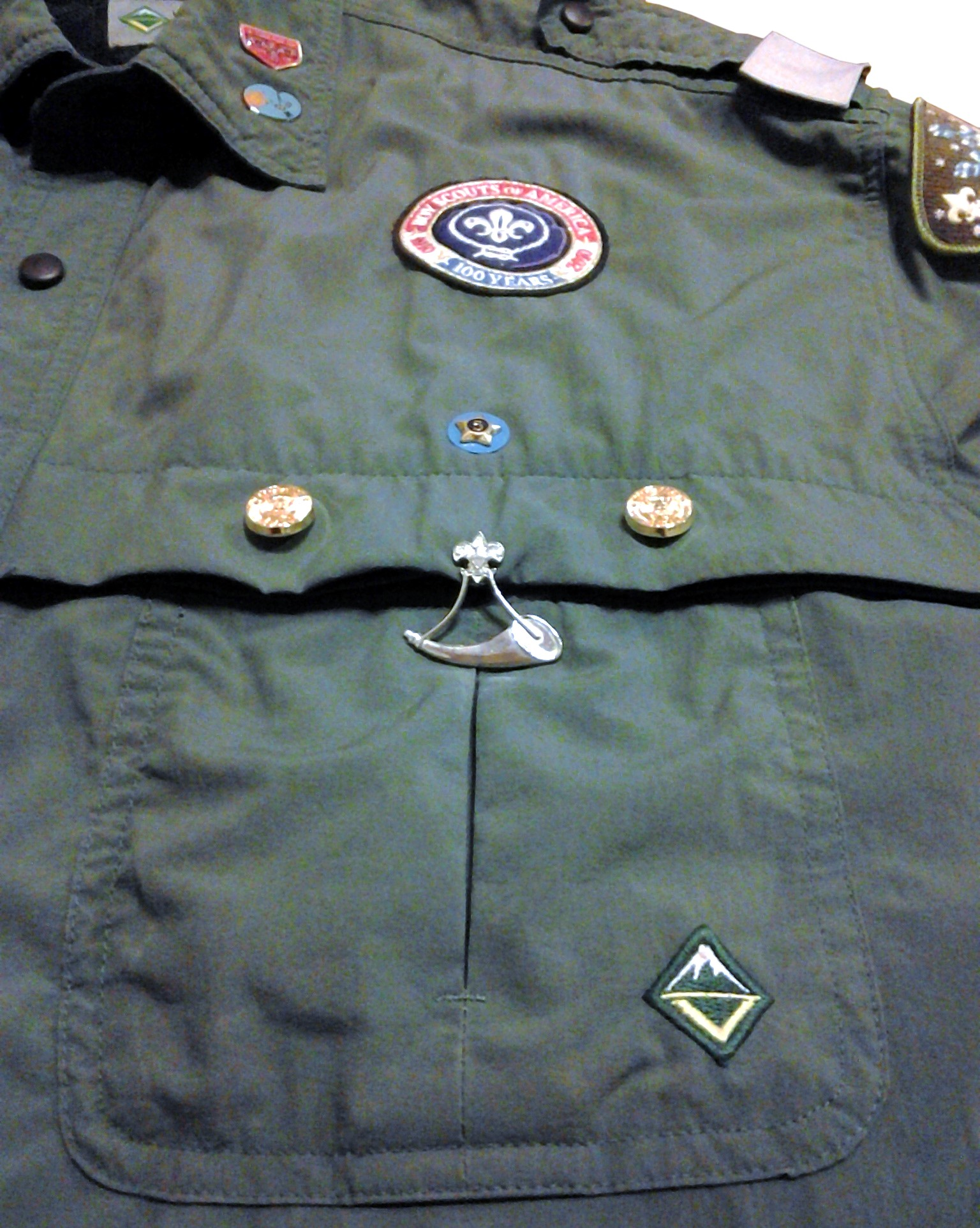
Pin Medal

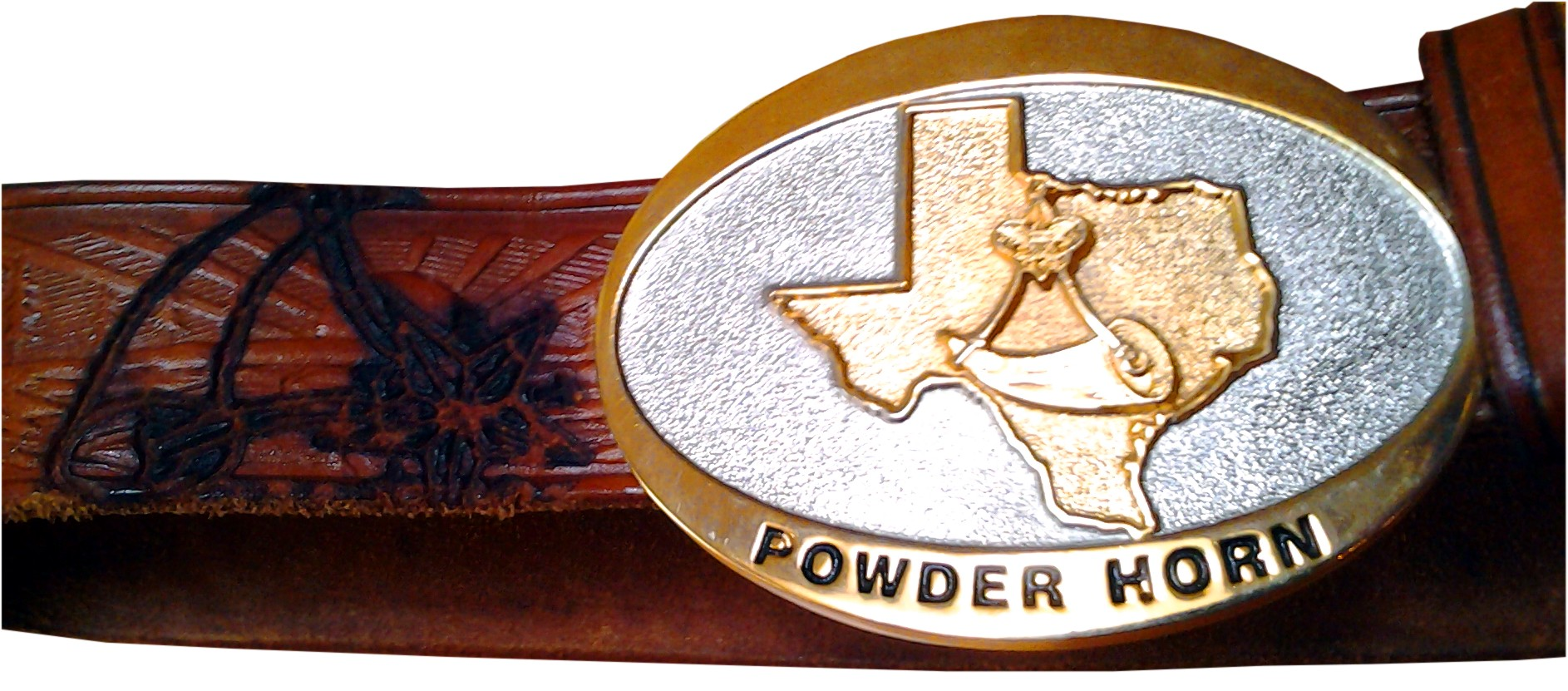
Texas Buckle & Branded Belt

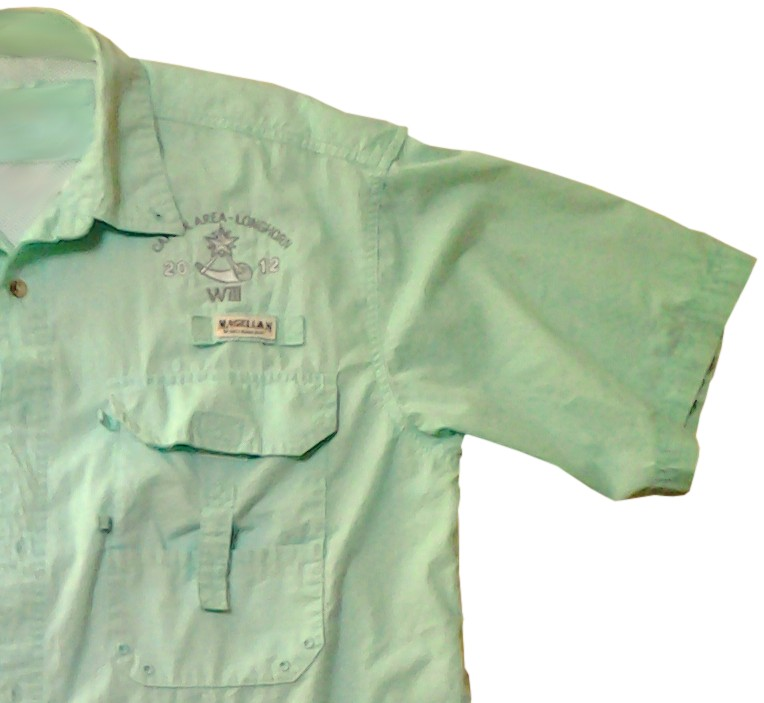
Activity (aka Class B) Uniform

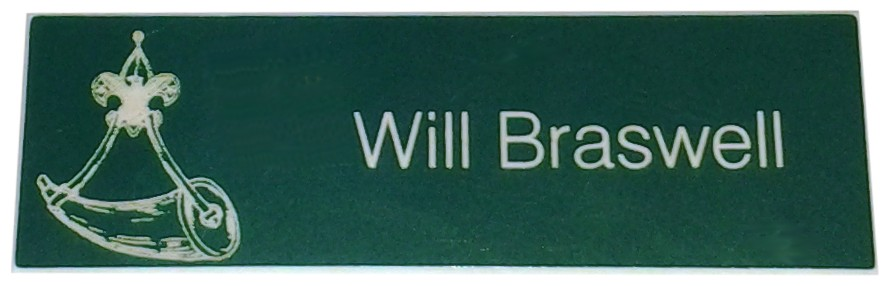
Name Plate
