= Mouvement des Guides et Eclaireuses du Niger =

National Guiding organization of Niger

- Founded: 2002
- Membership: 1,429
- Affiliation: World Association of Girl Guides and Girl Scouts

The Mouvement des Guides et Eclaireuses du Niger is the national Guiding organization of Niger. It became an associate member of the World Association of Girl Guides and Girl Scouts in 2017. Delegates from Niger and prospect countries Ethiopia and Mozambique attended the 11th Africa Regional Conference from 26 to 31 July 2016 in Nairobi, Kenya.

== See also ==
- Association des Scouts du Niger
