= Spirit of the Eagle Award =

Posthumous award for Boy Scouts of America

- Certificate
- Owner: Boy Scouts of America
- Country: United States of America
- Created: 1998
- Awarded for: Recognition for a youth member who has lost his or her life.

The Spirit of the Eagle Award is a Boy Scouts of America (BSA) honorary posthumous special recognition for a youth member under the age of 21 who has lost their life in an accident or through illness. The intention of the award is to help heal and comfort the youth member's family, loved ones, and friends with their loss. It recognizes the joy, happiness, and life-fulfilling experiences the Scouting program made in the youth's life and serves as a final salute and tribute to the departed.

The award is limited to registered youth members and must be submitted by the unit committee within six months of the youth's death. The award consists of a certificate with a soaring eagle, and is imprinted with Spirit of the Eagle Award and Espiritu Del Aguila.
