= Ranger Award =

Boy Scouts of America award

- Medal and bar
- Owner: Boy Scouts of America
- Country: United States
- Created: 1998
- Awarded for: Outdoor skills proficiency
- Website www.scouting.org/scoutsource/Venturing/Awards/ranger.aspx

The Ranger Award is an award available to youth in the Venturing program of the Boy Scouts of America, to encourage and recognize proficiency in skills.

== Award ==
The medal is an antique silver colored roundel suspended from a white and green ribbon that is in turn suspended from a bar. The medal is inscribed with a compass rose with the BSA universal badge at the top and the word RANGER at the bottom. A powderhorn is in the center on a green enameled background. The bar is inscribed with RANGER. The Ranger bar is available as a separate item for informal uniform wear. There is no square knot insignia and no plans to add one, as the Venturing Summit is the highest award in Venturing and thus the only award on par to have a knot with Eagle Scout (Scouts BSA program), Quartermaster (Sea Scout program), and Arrow of Light (Cub Scout program).

The Ranger Bar originally was raised Silver letters on back to match the Ranger bar above the metal however it was changed to be polished sterling silver with black engraved letters around 2006.

== Requirements ==
To earn the Ranger Award, Venturers must complete core requirements and electives. The requirements are the most challenging award requirements in the Boy Scouts of America and it's not uncommon for this award to take a year or longer to achieve. Compared to Eagle Scout, an Eagle Scout must earn the first aid merit badge, by becoming certified in standard first aid. To earn the first aid elective, a Ranger must complete a 16-hour Wilderness first aid course plus an 8 hour CPR Course so the total training is a minimum of 24 hours. There are eight requirements, called Core Requirements, that must be earned by all Ranger Candidates. In addition, a Venturer must complete four out of eighteen requirements, called Electives.

=== Core requirements ===
To earn the Ranger Award, all Venturers must earn the following awards:

1. First Aid
2. Communications
3. Cooking
4. Emergency Preparedness
5. Land Navigation
6. Leave No Trace
7. Wilderness Survival
8. Conservation

=== Electives ===
To earn the Ranger Award, Venturers must earn four of the following:

1. Backpacking
2. Cave Exploring
3. Cycling/Mountain Biking
4. Ecology
5. Equestrian
6. First Aid (Different from the Core Requirement)
7. Fishing
8. Hunting
9. Lifesaver (Lifeguarding)
10. Mountaineering
11. Outdoor Living History
12. Physical Fitness
13. Plants and Wildlife
14. Project COPE
15. Scuba
16. Shooting Sports
17. Watercraft
18. Winter Sports

== Origins ==
The first Ranger Medal was issued between 1946 and 1949 as part of the BSA's Explorer Scout Program. Although the Ranger program was officially discontinued in 1949, Explorer Scouts could continue work on the Ranger Award until 1951. A total of 2,782 Explorers earned the original Ranger Award between 1944 and 1951.

The Ranger Award was re-introduced by the BSA in 1998 as part of the new Venturing program. Adam Snyder of Waukegan, Illinois was the first Venturer to earn the Ranger Award in 1999.

== Training ==
Scout leaders and youth interested in learning about the Ranger Award had the opportunity to take the Powder Horn high adventure training course. The course was discontinued in 2024.
