= Eagle Scout =

Highest rank in Scouts BSA

- The Eagle Scout medal and rank badge
- Owner: Scouting America
- Country: United States
- Created: 1911
- Recipients: 27,718 (2026); 2.8 million (total)

Eagle Scout is the highest rank attainable in the Scouts BSA program of Scouting America. Since its inception in 1911, only four percent of Scouts have earned this rank after a lengthy review process. The Eagle Scout rank has been earned by over 2.8 million youth.

Requirements include earning at least 21 merit badges, 13 of which are specifically required; the others are chosen by the Scout. The Eagle Scout must demonstrate Scout Spirit, an ideal attitude based upon the Scout Oath and Law, service, and leadership. This includes an extensive service project that the Scout plans, organizes, leads, and manages. Eagle Scouts are presented with a medal and a badge that visibly recognizes the accomplishments of the Scout. Additional recognition can be earned through Eagle Palms, awarded for completing additional tenure, leadership, and merit badge requirements.

Those who have earned the rank of Eagle Scout also become eligible, although are not required, to join the National Eagle Scout Association.

== History ==
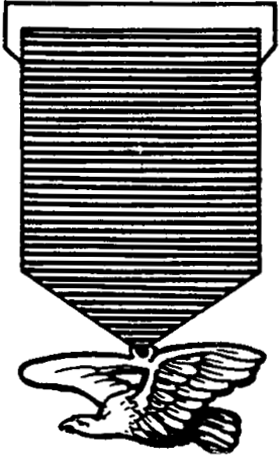
The original Eagle Scout medal concept

The BSA's highest award was originally conceived as the Wolf Scout, described in the June 1911 Official Handbook for Boys. The August 1911 version of the handbook changed this to Eagle Scout. The medal illustrated in the handbook was a profile of an eagle in flight, but was changed to the current design before any were issued. In their original conceptions, Life Scout, Star Scout (Life preceded Star until 1924) and Eagle Scout were not ranks, but part of the merit badge system that recognized Scouts who had earned a specified number of merit badges. Eagle Scout was awarded to any First Class Scout who had earned 21 merit badges.

The first Eagle Scout medal was awarded in 1912 to Arthur Rose Eldred, a 17-year-old member of Troop 1 of Rockville Centre, Long Island, New York. Records show that not only the national officers sat on Eldred's Board of Review, but also included Lord Baden-Powell, who arrived in the United States earlier in the day of January 31, 1912. Eldred was notified that he was to be awarded the rank of Eagle Scout in a letter from Chief Scout Executive James West, dated August 21, 1912. The design of the Eagle Scout medal had not been finalized by the National Council, so the medal was not awarded until Labor Day, September 2, 1912. Eldred was the first of three generations of Eagle Scouts; his son and grandson hold the rank as well. In the 1960s, the Kansas City area awarded more Eagle Scout badges than any other council in the country, resulting in the creation of the Eagle Scout Memorial there in 1968. In 1982, 13-year-old Alexander Holsinger of Normal, Illinois, was recognized as the one-millionth Eagle Scout, and Anthony Thomas of Lakeville, Minnesota, was the two-millionth in 2009.

Hamilton Bradley of Rome, New York, is the earliest known Black Eagle Scout in BSA history. His Eagle Scout court of honor was held at 7:30 p.m. on December 19, 1919, at the Rome Free Academy, according to Rome Daily Sentinel records from the time.

On October 11, 2017, Boy Scouts of America announced they would begin a program to include girls in the Boy Scout program beginning in 2019. With the introduction of Scouts BSA and the acceptance of girls, the age limit for Eagle Scout was extended. In February 2019, the first girls joined the renamed Scouts BSA program. New youth members, girls or boys, 16 years of age or older, but not yet 18 who joined between February 1, 2019, and December 31, 2019, could request an extension to complete the Eagle Scout Award requirements after they turn 18 years of age. In 2020, the first female Eagle Scouts were added to the Boy Scouts of America. On February 8, 2021, nearly 1,000 female Scouts became members of the Inaugural Class of Female Eagle Scouts. Members of the Inaugural Class were commemorated in a special edition of Scout Life magazine; the publication formerly known as Boys' Life.

== Requirements ==
The rank of Eagle Scout may be earned by a Scout who has been an active Life Scout for at least six months, has earned a minimum of 21 merit badges, has demonstrated Scout Spirit, and has demonstrated leadership within their troop, crew or ship. Additionally they must plan, develop, and lead a service project—the Eagle Project—that demonstrates both leadership and a commitment to duty. After all requirements are met, they must complete an Eagle Scout board of review. The board of review can be completed up to 3 months after their 18th birthday as long as all other requirements are completed before their 18th birthday. Venturers and Sea Scouts who attained First Class as a Scout may continue working toward the Star, Life and Eagle Scout ranks, as well as Eagle Palms, while registered as a Venturer or Sea Scout up to their 18th birthday. Scouts with a permanent mental or physical disability may use alternate requirements based on abilities, if approved by the council.

Eagle Scout may be awarded posthumously, if and only if all requirements except the board of review are completed before death. A board of review may be held and the award presented to the Scout's family. The Spirit of the Eagle Award is an honorary posthumous special recognition for any registered youth member who has died in an accident or through illness. The Line of Duty Fallen Eagle Recognition is a recognition for Eagle Scouts who have died in the line of duty in professions such as the military, law enforcement or emergency services.

=== Eagle Scout Service Project ===
The Eagle Scout Service Project, or simply "Eagle Project," is the opportunity for a Scout to demonstrate leadership of others while performing a project for the benefit of any religious institution, any school, or their community. The project is not allowed to benefit the Boy Scouts of America or its councils, districts, units, camps and so forth. It also cannot be of a commercial nature or be solely a fund-raising project. There is no official requirement for duration of projects.

=== Development ===
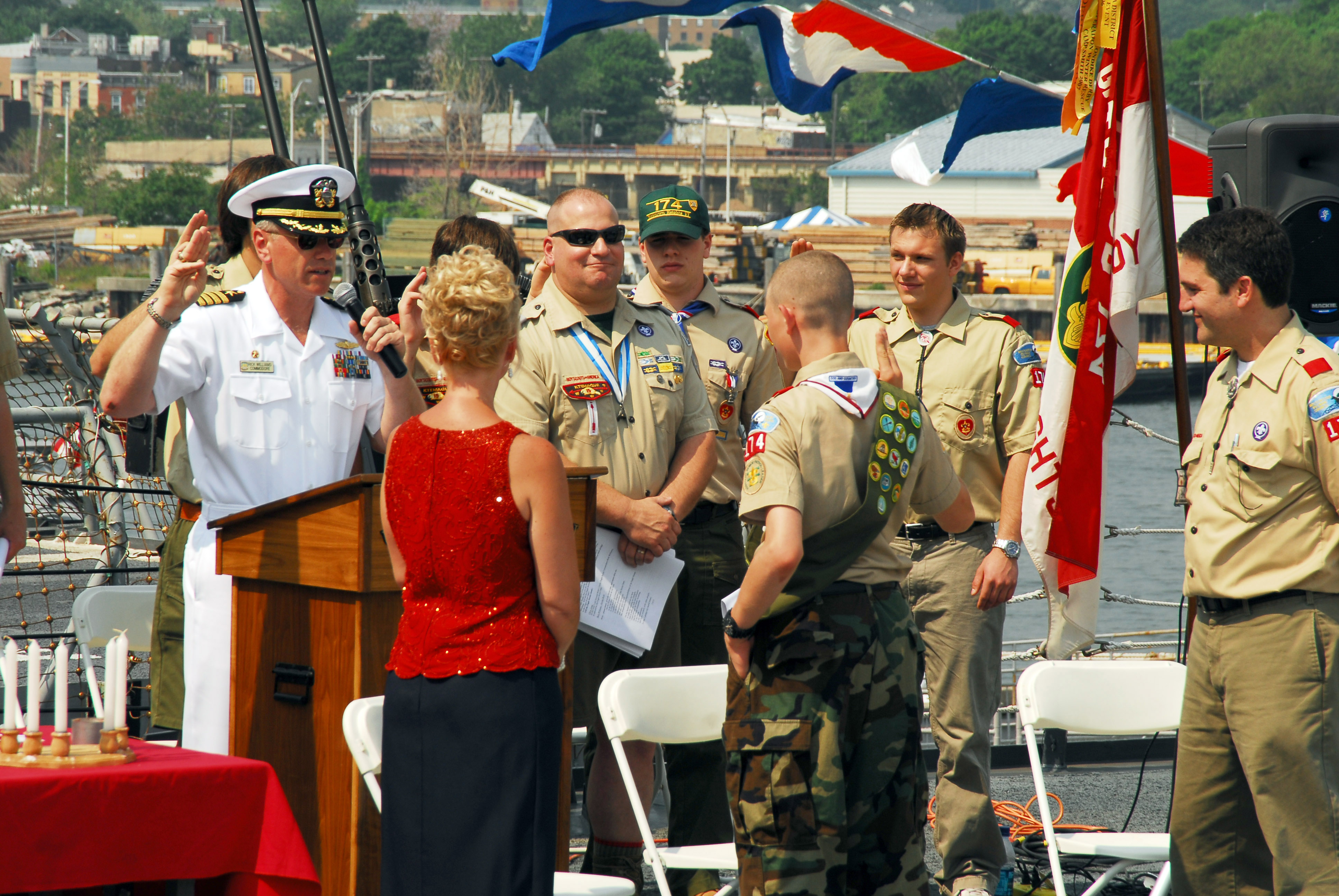
A Scout taking the Eagle Scout Charge during his Court of Honor aboard the USS Oscar Austin

Eagle Scout requirements have evolved since the award was conceived. A requirement to earn 11 specific merit badges was added in 1914, which underwent minor changes in 1915. The Life–Star order was reversed in 1924, apparently because the five-pointed star of the Star Scout insignia could be associated with the five merit badges required to earn the rank immediately following First Class Scout. In 1927, Eagle Scout began the transition from being a super merit badge to a rank. As a result, the first requirements for tenure were created and Scouts were required to be an active First Class Scout for one year. The initial requirements for what became the service project appeared with a requirement to show satisfactory service and the number of required merit badges increased to 12. In 1936, the ranks of Star and Life became mandatory, and the number of required merit badges rose to 13. It was at this time that Eagle Scout became a full-fledged rank. In 1952, age limits were set so that adults over 18 years of age could no longer earn Eagle Scout and the service project requirement was slightly expanded to "do your best to help in your home, school, church or synagogue, and community." In 1958, the number of required merit badges increased again to 16 of the 21 total merit badges needed to obtain Eagle, along with the first requirements for service and leadership.

In 1965, the requirements for the service project and specific troop leadership were defined, and the number of required merit badges returned to 11. The Eagle Scout candidate was required to plan, develop, and carry out a leadership service project. Minor changes were made to the required merit badge list in 1970. In 1972, the Improved Scouting Program increased to 24 the number of merit badges needed to obtain Eagle, while reducing the list of required merit badges to ten, eliminating badges that required swimming and outdoor skills—both of which were later reinstated, and adding the requirement to show leadership during the service project. In 1978, the number of merit badges needed for Eagle was lowered to the original 21, and the number of required merit badges was set at 11 (this was changed to 12 in 1993 with the addition of Family Life). In 2014, the number of Eagle-required merit badges was increased to 13 with the re-addition of Cooking; in 2022, it was increased to 14 with the addition of Citizenship in Society. It returned to 13 following the discontinuation of Citizenship in Society in 2026.

Scouts must earn the following 10 merit badges as there are no alternates: Camping, Citizenship in the Community, Citizenship in the Nation, Citizenship in the World, Communication, Cooking, First Aid, Family Life, Personal Fitness, and Personal Management. In addition, Scouts must choose one each from the following to round out their required merit badges: Emergency Preparedness OR Lifesaving; Environmental Science OR Sustainability; and, Swimming OR Hiking OR Cycling. The Scout must earn seven additional elective merit badges beyond the required 14 to become eligible for the award. If a Scout has earned more than one merit badges where there are alternates, the extras will be counted toward the 21 merit badge requirement total.

=== Palms ===
Palms represent additional advancement for a youth who has stayed active in the unit after achieving the rank of Eagle Scout. A Palm is awarded when the Scout has demonstrated Scout Spirit, leadership and ability; has earned five additional merit badges beyond those required for Eagle or for the last Palm; and has taken part in a conference with their unit leader.

The insignia is a small metallic palm frond pin or device that is worn on the ribbon of the Eagle Scout medal, on the Eagle Scout square knot or on the Eagle Scout badge.

The Palms are awarded in three colors: bronze, representing five merit badges; gold, representing ten merit badges; and silver, representing fifteen merit badges. For each Palm awarded for five additional merit badges beyond the first bronze, gold, and silver recognitions, Palms are worn in the combination that requires the smallest number of devices to reflect the total number of Palms earned. One gold Palm is equal to two bronze Palms, one silver Palm is equal to three bronze Palms, and one bronze Palm continues to be equal to five merit badges. For instance, a Scout who has earned eight Palms (forty additional merit badges) would wear two silver Palms and a gold Palm. The order of bronze, gold and silver follows heraldic traditions of the U.S. military.

Completed Palms can be awarded at the same time the Eagle Scout badge is presented. Previously, an Eagle Scout needed to wait three months between each Palm, even if the extra merit badges were earned before becoming an Eagle. This meant that, under the old rules, a youth who became an Eagle Scout at 17 years and 10 months was unable to earn a single Eagle Palm.

== Insignia and apparel ==
An Eagle Scout presentation kit, including Mom, Dad, and Mentor pins as well as the rank badge and medal

The Eagle Scout badge is worn on the left shirt pocket by youth. Adult leaders who earned the rank of Eagle Scout as a youth may wear the square knot on their uniform above the left shirt pocket. The Eagle Scout medal is worn on the left shirt pocket flap of the uniform. It is usually only worn on ceremonial occasions, and can be worn by both youth and adults while wearing the badge or square knot.

The Eagle Scout Award Kit currently includes the Eagle Scout medal, the Eagle Scout badge, a mother's pin, a father's pin and an Eagle Mentor pin. A variety of caps, belt buckles, pins, tie tacks, neckerchiefs and slides, bolo ties, rings, jackets, T-shirts and other items are also available for purchase. Official Eagle Scout insignia is controlled by BSA Supply and requires verification by presentation of an Eagle Scout card or other means before it can be purchased.

=== Medal ===
Since its introduction in 1912, the Eagle Scout medal has undergone several design changes. Changes to the scroll and to the eagle pendant were not always introduced at the same time, therefore types may be somewhat mixed. Scouting historians classify these medals by the five different manufacturers and then by 17 sub-types, with several minor variations. Many variations were caused by quality control issues, mainly due to wear of the dies.

T. H. Foley made the first medals from 1912 until they went out of business in 1915. The eagle pendant and scroll were of die struck bronze washed with silver. Early versions were made with a short double knot and later ones with a long double knot. Only 338 of these medals were issued, making them the rarest version. Some Foleys were issued with a drop ribbon: the ribbon was extended, folded through the bar mount on the scroll, then dropped behind the eagle pendant and cut in a swallowtail. The first drop ribbon style medal was issued to the fourth Eagle Scout, Sidney Clapp, a 31-year-old Scoutmaster from West Shokan, New York.

Dieges & Clust took over production from 1916 to 1921, basing the design on the Foley. These medals also have the distinguishing extra-long double knot hanging from the scroll. There were fewer than 1,640 of this variety awarded, all made of sterling silver.

In 1921, the Whitehead & Hoag Company took over production. They produced all the medals until the first Robbins Company medals appeared in January 1931, all in sterling silver. The first 1921 version was similar to the Dieges & Clust design, but with smaller scroll lettering and the standard single knot. The second 1921 version has more distinctive feathering on the back side of the pendant. In January 1931, the Robbins Company won the closed bid contract and struck their first Eagle Scout medals. This first Robbins version in early 1931 was especially detailed and especially fine. In 1933, the BSA lettering was removed from all of the Eagle Scout insignia, including the medal. In 1955 the obverse of the eagle pendant was made flat so it could be engraved. BSA was added back to the front and the reverse was returned to a full feathered design in 1969.

Medal manufacturer Stange was authorized to begin producing Eagle Scout medals in 1968, at the same time as Robbins- they created six distinct models. The 1968 version is very similar to the Robbins version, but the bend in the scroll is much flatter, more like a sideways V as compared to the S on the Robbins scroll. The BSA was added back to the front, and the obverse was returned to a full feathered design in 1970. A major re-design of the eagle pendant was made in 1974 to match the new National Eagle Scout Association logo. In 1978, Robbins ceased manufacturing Eagle Scout medals and Stange switched to the last design used by Robbins. Minor differences are in the white edged ribbon and the sterling silver markings. In 1980 the price of silver rose dramatically and the medal was changed to silver-plated, die-struck copper. Very early versions were silver-plated and oxidized, thus the scroll and pendant are black. Later versions were oxidized, buffed and lacquered to maintain the silver shine. Sterling silver medals were produced from the same dies and from this time were only available on special order. The year 1993 saw a number of changes. The clasp on the scroll was changed from the pin on type to a double clutch back. The pendant was changed to pewter and enlarged due to the lighter rigidity of the material.

Custom Fine Jewelry (CFJ) took over the contract in 1999 and has currently created three types. The initial versions were based on the last Stange version but with the ribbon attached through the clutch pins instead of a bar (this led to damage of the ribbon). A small number of sterling silver versions were made, marked with 925. In later 1999, the dies were laser engraved, giving a much sharper look and the ribbon mount was improved to eliminate wear. The knot went from wire to a molded version in 2001.

In the fall of 2006, the national supply division of the National Eagle Scout Association (NESA) began to issue replica Eagle Scout medals for specific wear on U.S. military dress uniforms. These medals were designed to be proportionate to other military medals: they contained the same pendant, but no scroll, and a ribbon that had been made thinner and more rectangular in shape. However, in December 2007, NESA stopped selling the mini-medal after service uniforming committees contacted the BSA and asked them to stop promoting the medal for wear on military dress uniforms. The Eagle Scout medal is not authorized for wear on any U.S. military uniform.

In 2025, to coincide with the organization's name change, the BSA lettering on the lower portion of the medal was removed.

=== Badge ===
Since its introduction, the Eagle Scout badge has undergone several design changes. Scouting historians have classified these badges into nine different designs, with several minor variations within each type.

The cloth badge was introduced for Eagle Scouts attending the 2nd World Scout Jamboree in Denmark in 1924 with a design based on the hat pin. The Eagle Scout merit badge was sewn onto the top of the merit badge sash that was also created for the jamboree. The design is quite similar to the current badge. As with other patches of the time, the rank badges were embroidered onto rolls of fabric and then cut. The edges were folded under before sewing the badge onto the sash. Initially produced on tan cloth, it was later switched to olive for the Scouts BSA uniform and white and blue to match the various Sea Scout uniforms. In 1933, BSA was removed from all of the Eagle Scout insignia, including the badge. The text Eagle Scout and Boy Scouts of America was added to the border, and Be Prepared was added to the scroll. These badges were embroidered with silk thread, switching to cotton in 1940.

The production of badges and emblems changed in 1956 to the rolled edge now in current use, thus eliminating the various colored backgrounds. The outside oval was then changed to red. With the introduction of the Improved Scouting Program in 1972 came an overhaul of many badges and emblems. The new stylized Eagle Scout badge with no text was a major change that proved to be unpopular. It appears that some Scouters commissioned reproductions of the 1956 badge for issue in place of the 1972 version. In 1975 the badge design partially reverted to the 1956 version. 1985 saw a reversion to the 1956 issue with some minor differences. The border and the eagle were done in silver metalized thread and the Be Prepared text was in blue. In 1986 the metalized eagle changed back to standard thread due to problems with wearing and the scroll and text were enlarged. The metalized border was changed to standard thread in 1989. Later variants increased the thread count of the white stripe to eliminate the visible background.

For the 2010 centennial, all of the rank badges had 2010 added to the text. To recognize the Eagle Scout centennial in 2012, a new version was released with Eagle Scout and Centennial in silver and with 1912 and 2012 in gold.

In 2025, to coincide with the organization's name change, the text reading Boy Scouts of America was changed to Scouting America.

=== Other insignia ===
The Eagle Scout square knot

Eagle Scout hat pins were produced from 1921 through 1958 with several variations. Eagle Scouts who earned additional merit badges were recognized using Eagle Palms, introduced in 1927. Adults who had earned Eagle Scout began to be recognized in 1934 with a red, white and blue ribbon bar. In 1940, a small eagle pin was added to the bar. Ribbon bars were replaced by embroidered square knot patches in 1947. Over the years, the knot was produced with various background colors to match the different uniforms. Although the Venturing and Sea Scout programs use different uniform shirts, the current knot is available only with a tan background that matches the Scouts BSA uniform. When the Distinguished Eagle Scout Award (DESA) was created in 1969, a gold-colored eagle device was introduced for wear on the Eagle Scout square knot. The Eagle Scout Mentor pin was introduced in early 2004 in a gold-colored version. In early 2006 it was changed to a silver-colored antique finish to match the mother and father pins but in 2007 was changed back to gold-colored. In 2008, the National Eagle Scout Association (NESA) introduced a knot recognizing those Eagle Scouts who are life members of NESA; it uses the standard knot emblem with a silver border.

=== Certificates ===
From 1912 to 1943 the BSA issued an index-sized card with information about the Eagle Scout. Wallet-size cards were introduced in 1944 and switched to a plastic credit card style in 1991. Certificates suitable for framing were first issued in 1944. As the honorary president of the BSA, the signature of the President of the United States appears on all certificates. Replacement of a card or certificate can be made by application through the National Eagle Scout Association (NESA).

== After achieving the rank of Eagle Scout ==
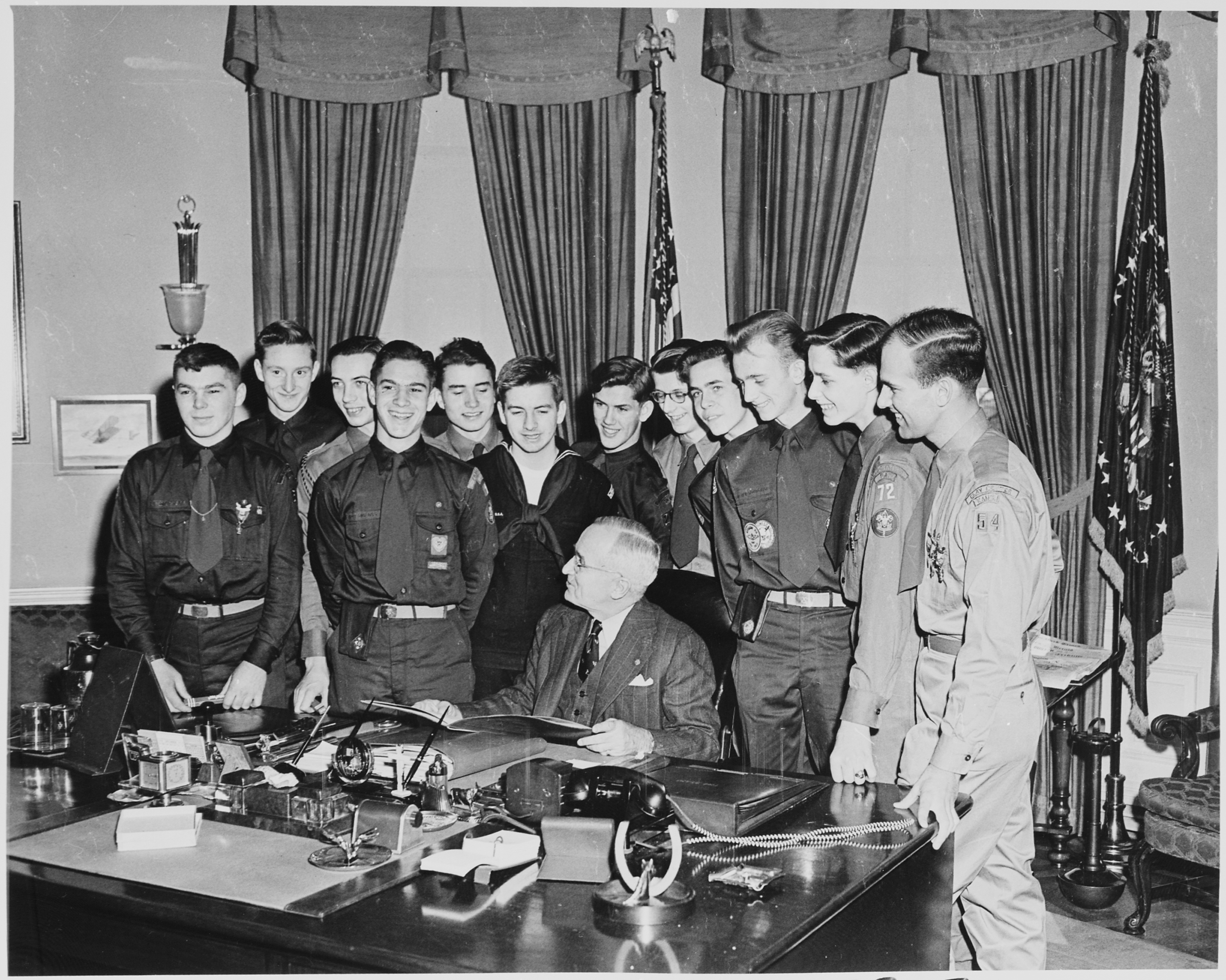
U.S. President Harry S. Truman meeting with a group of Eagle Scouts in the Oval Office, 1950

Eagle Scouts are expected to serve as examples for other Scouts and to take on leadership roles. They are represented in fields including the military, higher education, academia, business, and politics. Studies have reported that Eagle Scouts are more likely to volunteer for religious and nonreligious organizations, maintain close relationships with family and friends, hold leadership positions in their workplaces or communities, donate to charitable organizations, and participate in neighborhood improvement activities.

=== Scholarship opportunities ===
Academic scholarships can be awarded to Eagle Scouts based upon academic, financial need and Scouting participation. The application requirement for the Scout is to have a minimum score of 1290 on the SAT Reasoning Test or 28 on the ACT. Scholarships vary in the amount awarded.

=== Adult Eagle Scouts ===
Adult Scouters who earned Eagle Scout as a youth are entitled to wear a square knot emblem with a red, white, and blue striped square knot above the left shirt pocket. Eagle Scouts may join the National Eagle Scout Association (NESA), which serves as a fraternal and communications board for all Eagle Scouts. The NESA Outstanding Eagle Scout Award recognizes Eagle Scouts who have demonstrated outstanding achievement at the local, state, or regional level. The Distinguished Eagle Scout Award is given only to Eagle Scouts for distinguished service in their profession and the community for a period of at least 25 years after earning Eagle Scout.

Eagle Scouts who enlist in the U.S. Armed Forces may receive advanced enlisted rank in recognition of their achievements. For commissioned officer programs, attainment of Eagle Scout is considered a positive factor in determining service academy appointments and award of college ROTC scholarships.

NESA directly administers several Eagle Scout scholarships. The American Legion, the National Jewish Committee on Scouting, and the Sons of the American Revolution offer scholarships directed toward Eagle Scouts. Many colleges and universities, local businesses, churches and other organizations offer similar scholarships.

== Controversies ==
After the BSA v. Dale decision in 2000 affirmed the BSA's right to exclude homosexuals, a small number of Eagle Scouts returned their badges to the National Council in protest of the BSA's policies. The advocacy group Scouting for All claimed to have received as many as one thousand letters from Eagle Scouts who had done so; the BSA later stated that fewer than one hundred Eagle Scout badges had been received.

In 2012, the BSA reaffirmed its policies on the exclusion of homosexuals; again a number of Eagle Scouts returned their badges in protest. In May 2013, the National Council of the Boy Scouts of America voted to lift the ban on openly gay youth beginning on January 1, 2014, with the ban on openly gay adult leaders remaining in effect. On June 27, 2015, the ban on gay leaders was also lifted. In response, two Eagle Scouts returned their badges in protest of the change to the BSA's policy accepting gay Scouts.

== Recipients ==
Four Nobel Prize laureates are known to be Eagle Scouts: Dudley R. Herschbach, Peter Agre, Robert Coleman Richardson, and Frederick Reines. Twelve Eagle Scouts have been awarded the Medal of Honor: Eugene B. Fluckey, Aquilla J. Dyess, Robert Edward Femoyer, Walter Joseph Marm, Jr., Mitchell Paige, Thomas R. Norris, Arlo L. Olson, Ben L. Salomon, Leo K. Thorsness, Jay Zeamer Jr., Britt K. Slabinski and Royce Williams.

At least forty astronauts earned the rank as a youth, including Neil Armstrong and Charles Duke, both of whom walked on the Moon, and James Lovell of the Apollo 13 mission.

Businessmen who have earned the award include Walmart founder Sam Walton, Marriott International CEO J. W. Marriott, Jr., and Michael Bloomberg, Mayor of New York City and founder of Bloomberg L.P.

Eagle Scouts who have held public office include 38th president of the United States Gerald R. Ford, 22nd U.S. secretary of defense Robert Gates, 13th and 21st U.S. secretary of defense Donald Rumsfeld, 69th U.S. secretary of state Rex Tillerson, former associate justice of the U.S. Supreme Court Stephen Breyer and 84th U.S. attorney general Jeff Sessions.

In academia, Eagle Scouts are represented by Pulitzer Prize for General Nonfiction-winner E.O. Wilson, E. Gordon Gee, former President of Ohio State University, and Kim B. Clark, former Dean of the Harvard Business School, and former president of Brigham Young University–Idaho.

Athletes who have earned Eagle Scout include NBA Player and 2026 NBA Champion Josh Hart, Basketball Hall of Famer (later U.S. senator) Bill Bradley, NBA All-Star Mark Eaton, MLB All-Star Shane Victorino, Daytona 500 winner William Byron, pitcher Jon Moscot, running back David Montgomery, Notre Dame and San Diego Chargers linebacker Manti Te'o, and Philadelphia Eagles guard Landon Dickerson.

Religious leaders who have earned Eagle Scout include Cardinal Archbishop Emeritus of Baltimore William H. Keeler, and Howard W. Hunter, 14th president of the Church of Jesus Christ of Latter-day Saints.

In the entertainment industry, recipients include film directors Steven Spielberg and David Lynch, filmmaker Michael Moore, actors Zach Galifianakis and John Heder, Imagine Dragons member Dan Reynolds, composer John Tesh, and Mike Rowe, host of Dirty Jobs.

Other notable recipients include Sam Berns, an American teen who had progeria and helped raise awareness about the disease, the novelist and adventurer Clive Cussler, and Ross Ulbricht, the creator of the darknet Silk Road.

== Impact ==
The National Eagle Scout Association (NESA) researched the total volunteer hours of the Eagle service projects ever done and it came to a total of more than 100 million hours of service. Each year, new Eagle Scouts add more than three million more hours. Eagle Scouts completed about 9.5 million hours in 2011.

August 1 is officially recognized by NESA as National Eagle Scout Day in recognition of Arthur Rose Eldred's Board of Review in 1912.
