= Church of Saint Mark (Saint Paul, Minnesota) =

Historic church in Minnesota, United States

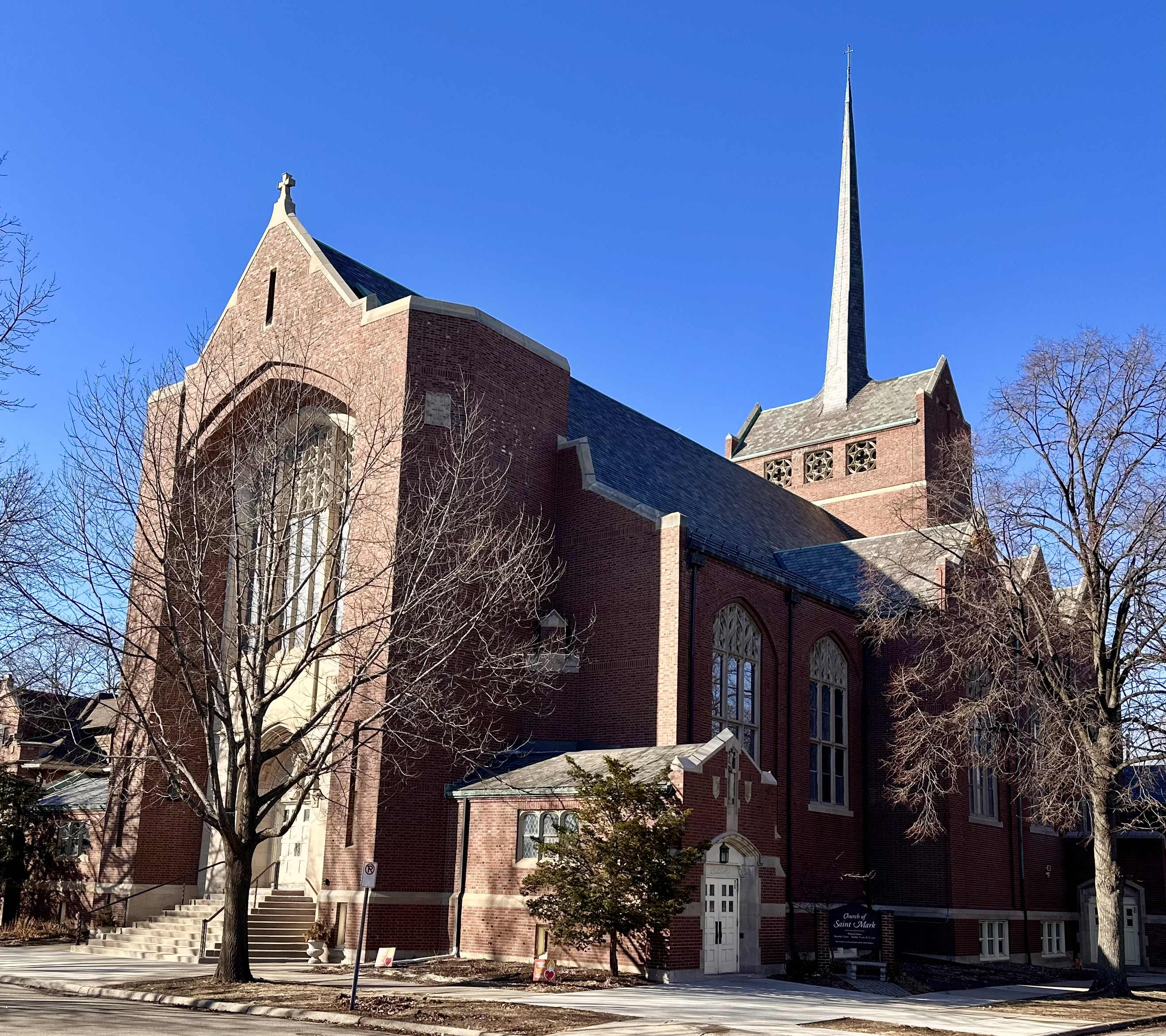
- Church of Saint Mark
- 44°56′51″N 93°11′04″W
- Location: 2001 Dayton Ave, Saint Paul, Minnesota
- Country: United States
- Denomination: Roman Catholic
- Website: https://www.onestrongfamily.org

History
- Status: Parish
- Founded: 1889
- Consecrated: August 10, 1919

Architecture
- Functional status: Active
- Architect: John T. Comes
- Style: Tudor Revival, English Gothic
- Years built: 1918–1919

Specifications
- Height: 150 feet (46 m)

Administration
- Diocese: Archdiocese of Saint Paul and Minneapolis

Clergy
- Archbishop: Bernard Hebda

The Church of Saint Mark is a Roman Catholic church in the city of Saint Paul, Minnesota. It is a parish church within the Archdiocese of Saint Paul and Minneapolis, encompassing the Merriam Park neighborhood of Saint Paul. It is named for Saint Mark, one of the Four Evangelists of the New Testament.

In addition to the building's unique architecture and long-standing local prominence, the church is notable for being the birthplace of Catholic scouting in the United States, as it is home to the first and oldest Catholic Boy Scouts of America troop in the United States, dating back over 100 years.

Since 2009, the parish has been administered by the religious order Pro Ecclesia Sancta, a religious congregation consisting both of priests and religious sisters, both of which are present and minister at the parish.

== History ==
=== Prior to establishment ===
The Catholic presence in the Saint Paul area reaches back extensively, to the establishment in 1839 of Saint Peter's Catholic Church on a strip of nearby land overlooking the Mississippi River that eventually became what is now the city of Mendota Heights. Bishop Mathias Loras, then the Bishop of Dubuque, who at the time had episcopal jurisdiction over Minnesota, visited Saint Peter's and the Fort Snelling frontier post on missionary visits in 1839 and 1847. As families continued to settle the area of the confluence of the Mississippi and the Minnesota River, the availability of Catholic sacraments for both Catholic settlers and those living at the Fort Snelling became a consideration. Permanently settled, what is now municipally Saint Paul was still disparate and rural, and the modern-day Merriam Park neighborhood (in which the church is located) was still a separate village from city of Saint Paul. Following the completion of the short-line railroad between Saint Paul and Minneapolis, and the continued growth of families and industries in the area, the village was incorporated into the burgeoning City of Saint Paul in 1885. Originally, there was initial consideration to build an archdiocesan cathedral in the Merriam Park neighborhhod. After a brief period this course of action was abandoned, however, since it was deemed unfitting to have a cathedral in what was still considered a "country" area at the time, thus leading to the final location of the current Cathedral of Saint Paul. Although Catholic religious services in Merriam Park date back to 1877, when diocesan priests provided sacraments for families and religious brothers of the Franciscan Third Order (who operated a school there), a more permanent church presence separate from the local seminary was still needed in Merriam Park. Archbishop John Ireland, on an 1888 visit to the seminary during student exams,

"was visited by several residents of Merriam Park and vicinity in reference to the building of a church, the neighborhood having no place to worship thus far except the Seminary Chapel, which is not suited to their needs."

In response, the decision was made in 1889 to erect a parish, which is now the Church of Saint Mark.

=== Parish ===
During the public fundraising efforts for the construction of the Cathedral of Saint Paul at the start of the 20th Century, Saint Mark's Church contributed $11,140.50 of which $5,786.50 came from individual parishioner contributions and $5,354.00 came from the church's treasury.

A parochial school was opened on the parish grounds in 1913, on the block to the east across the street from the main church. This school was originally staffed by religious sisters from the Sisters of St. Joseph of Carondelet. At its post-war peak enrollment, it boasted an enrollment of 1,600 students across kindergarten through high school. Waning enrollment over the decades of the latter half of the 20th Century and into the 21st Century resulted in the shrinking of the school to a K-8 model, and eventually the closure of the school in 2019. The school building remains in use today, housing a parish-sponsored preschool that continues, additional classrooms for homeschooling co-ops, and a coworking space for Catholic business owners and entrepreneurs.

The parish has been administered since 2009 by Pro Ecclesia Sancta, a religious order for both priests and religious sisters. Although Pro Ecclesia Sancta was originally founded in Peru, the formation house for male novices and seminarians of the American Province of the order is located at the church.

== Boy Scouts ==
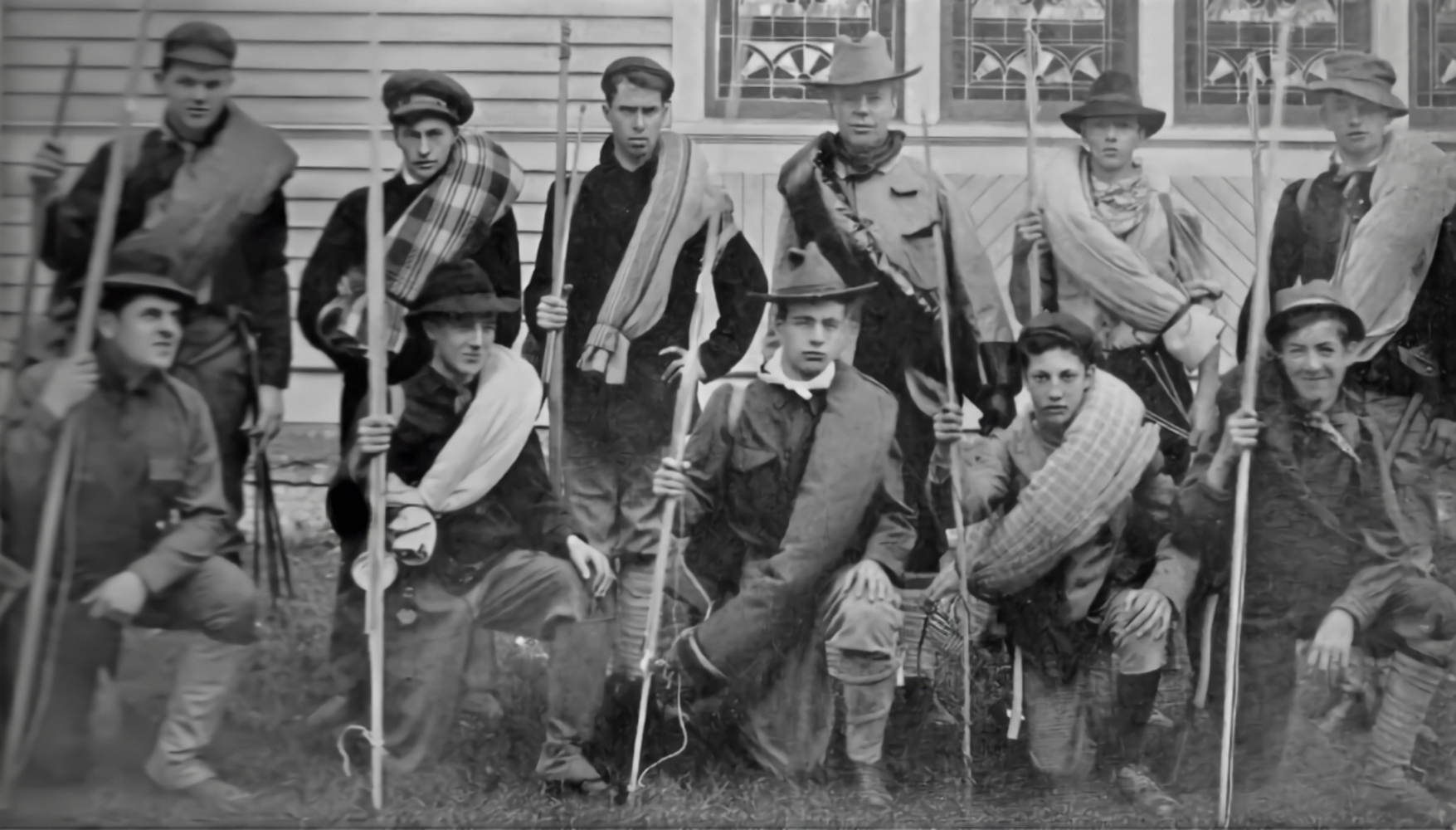
First Boy Scouts, with the troop's organizer, Father William Hart (bottom left). September 1910

In September 1910, the pastor at the time, the Rev. Father William L. Hart, founded a Boy Scouts troop as part of the parish, exclusively for the boys who were members of the parish. This troop - the "George Washington Troop" - was not only the first Boy Scout troop in Saint Paul, but also the first Boy Scout troop of its kind in the country at the time (being a parish-based troop), bearing the distinction of being the first Catholic Boy Scout troop in the United States, and the birthplace of Catholic Scouting as a subset of the broader Scouting Movement. Father Hart would later serve as a chaplain with the US Army in World War I, where he would be mentioned in dispatches for heroism in the Meuse-Argonne Offensive.

== Design ==
The parish had originally approached the architect Emmanuel Masqueray, who had also designed the Cathedral of Saint Paul and several other regional churches, to design the new church building. However, Masqueray died before a contract could be finalized. Work eventually went to the Pittsburgh-based architect John T. Comes, who created a design based in a pared-down Tudor Revival style.

=== Exterior ===
The exterior of the church building consists of red bricks and large blocks of gray stone. Large windows are found both along the transepts and in the front and rear walls, with pointed arches set at wider angles than typical gothic arches (which normally rise to a more dramatic and sharp apex). Stone steps lead up to the main doors of the church, an entrance set within a similarly gentle gothic arch entry, topped with a statue of the Christ the Teacher set in the tympanum. Atop the east narthex doors, a statue of the titular evangelist Saint Mark rests on a pediment above the entrance. A predominantly notable feature of the exterior is its unique six-sided, sharp needle-like spire that rises up from the towered steeple over the sanctuary end of the church, topped with an oxidized copper cross. At one point, the tower contained a belfry and bells. Removed during the second half of the 20th Century, currently it no longer contains bells.

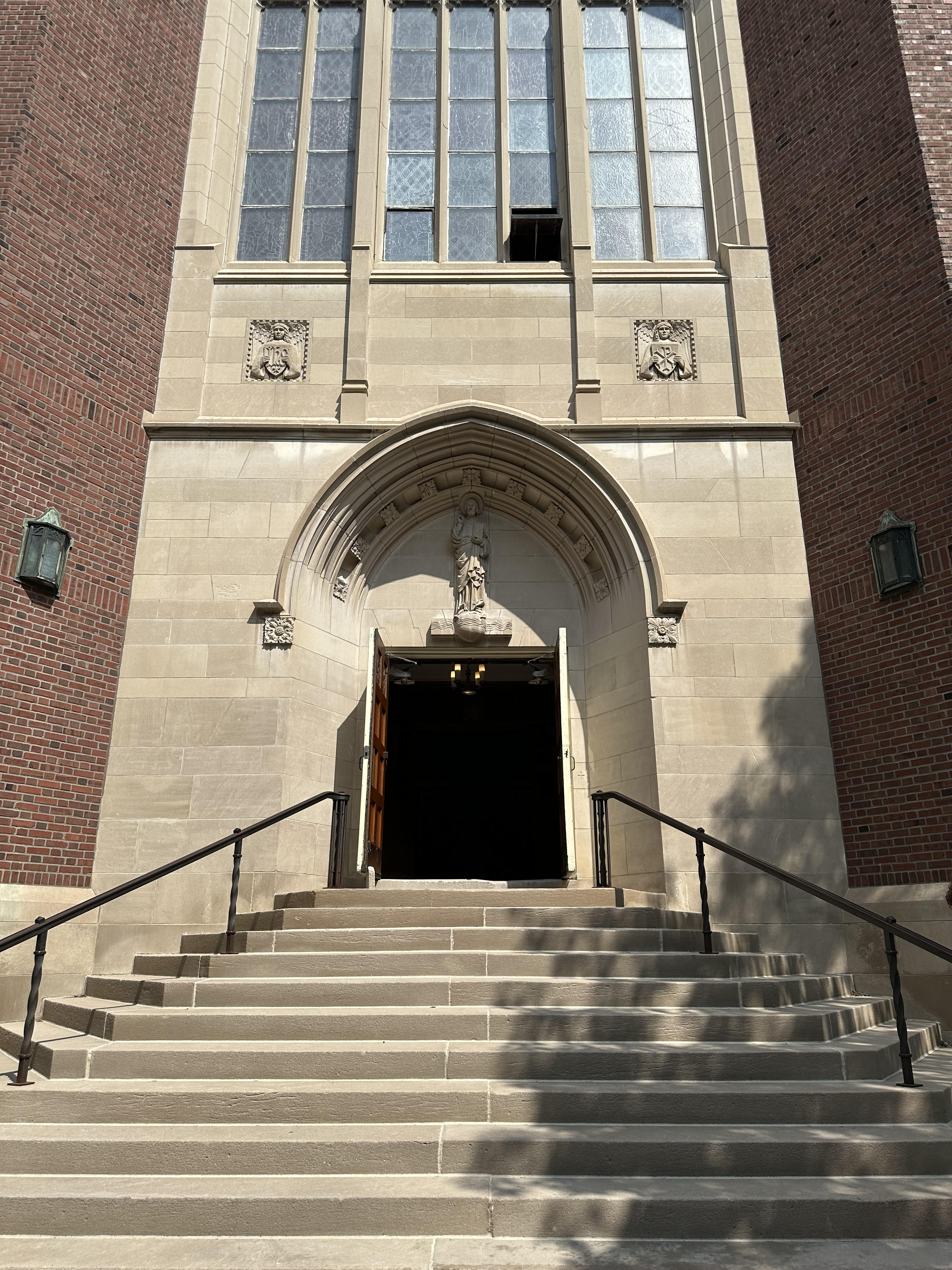
Front Entrance Portal and tympanum, as seen from Dayton Avenue

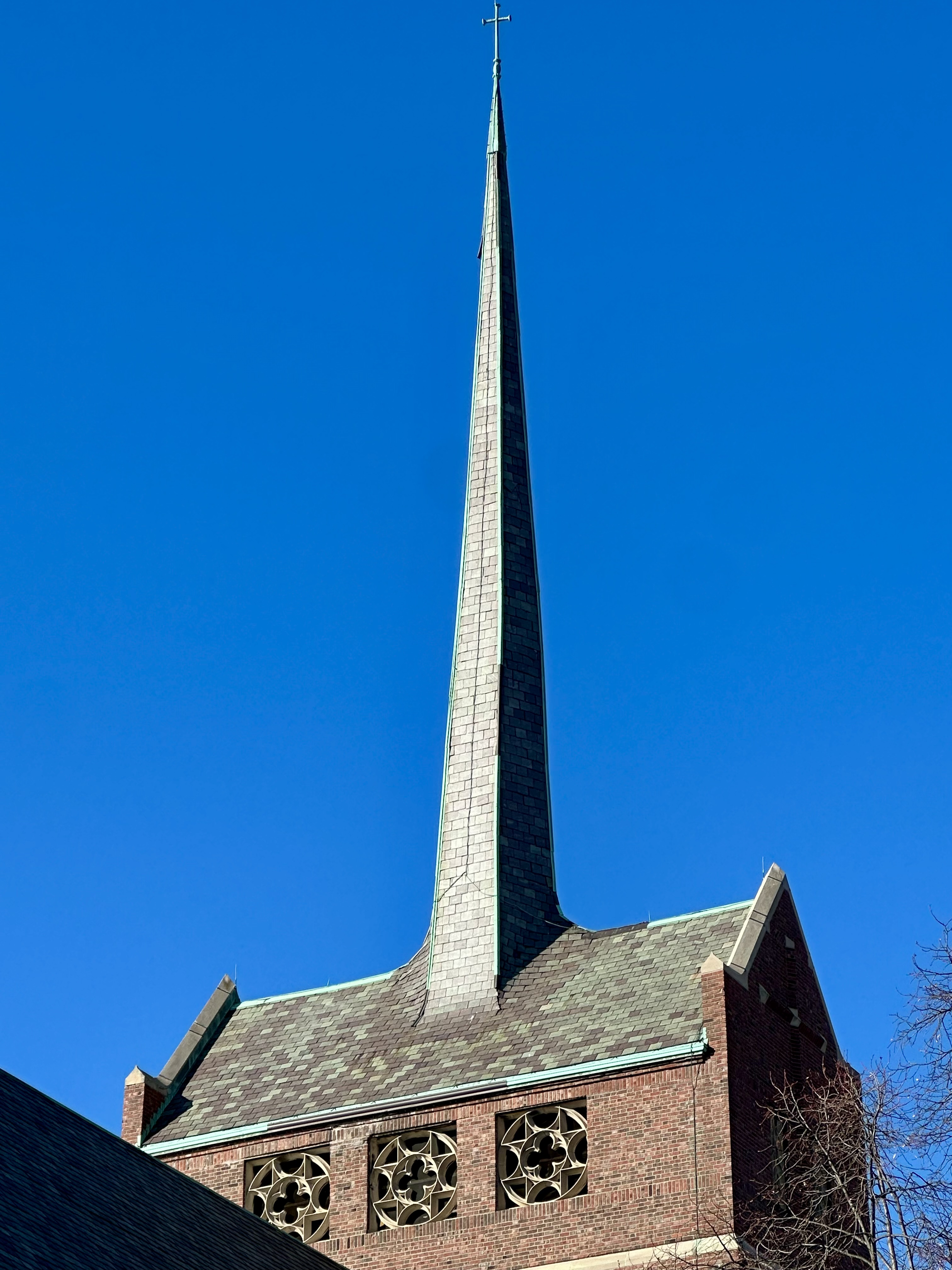
Church belfry steeple with needle-like spire

=== Interior ===
The main sanctuary of the church is notable for its large ornate reredos altarpiece of dark-stained wood, with various gilt carved trim motifs and featuring panels of various saints. A particular and unique feature of the reredos is the inclusion of several carved squirrels along each side of the reredos, with each squirrel holding an acorn. This is extraordinarily rare; the squirrel is seldom featured as a symbol in the tradition of Catholic sacred art, and thus is rarely, if ever, depicted throughout the history of Christian sacred art. The symbolism of the squirrels, and what they represent on the altarpiece, remains unknown.

The church has two side altars, one dedicated to the Blessed Virgin Mary and the other to Saint Joseph. The murals of angels flaking the statues of each of the altars' titular patrons incorporate elements from both the predominantly Catholic Beuronese and the broader, more contemporary Art Nouveau styles.

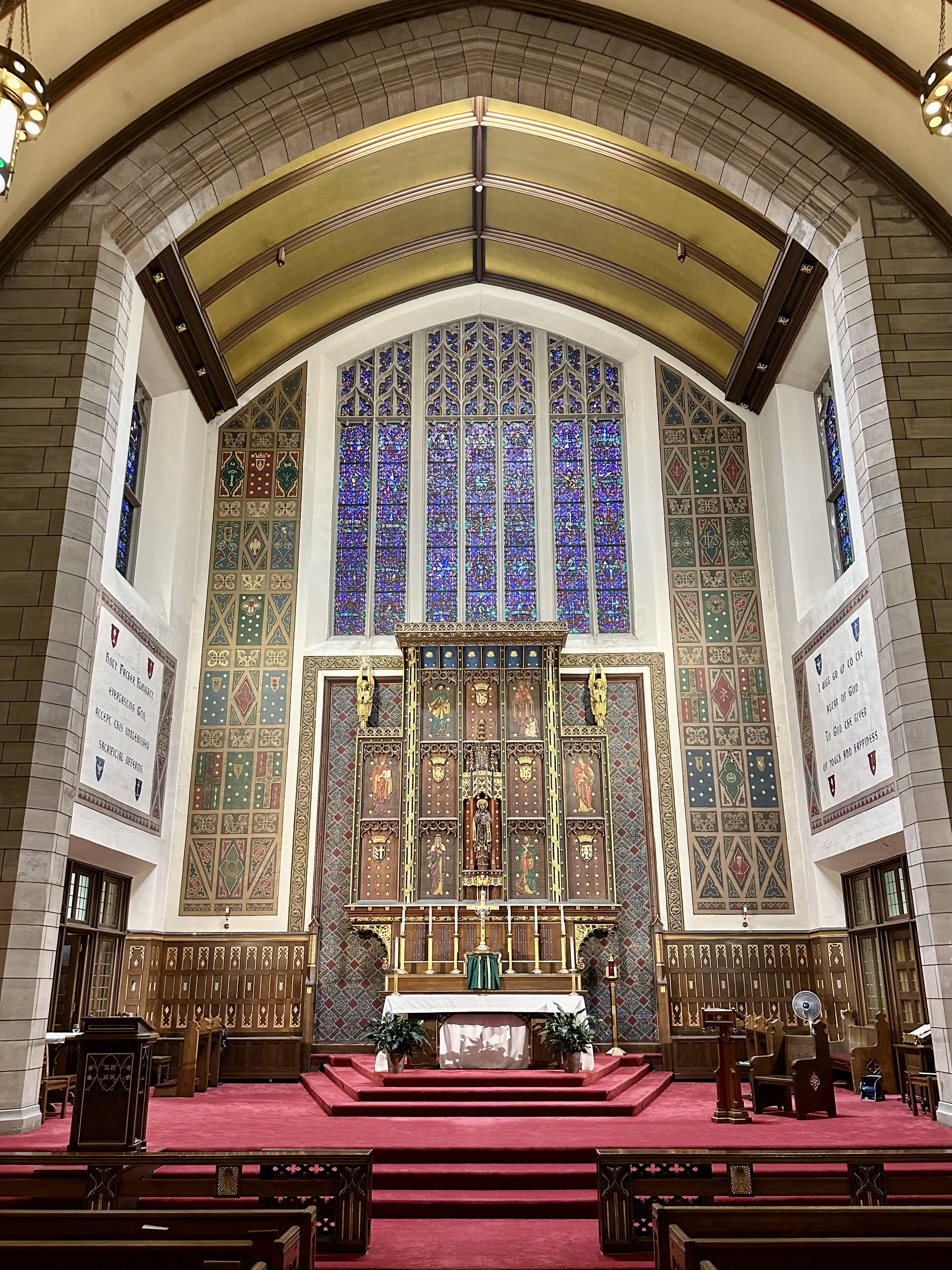
Main Sanctuary

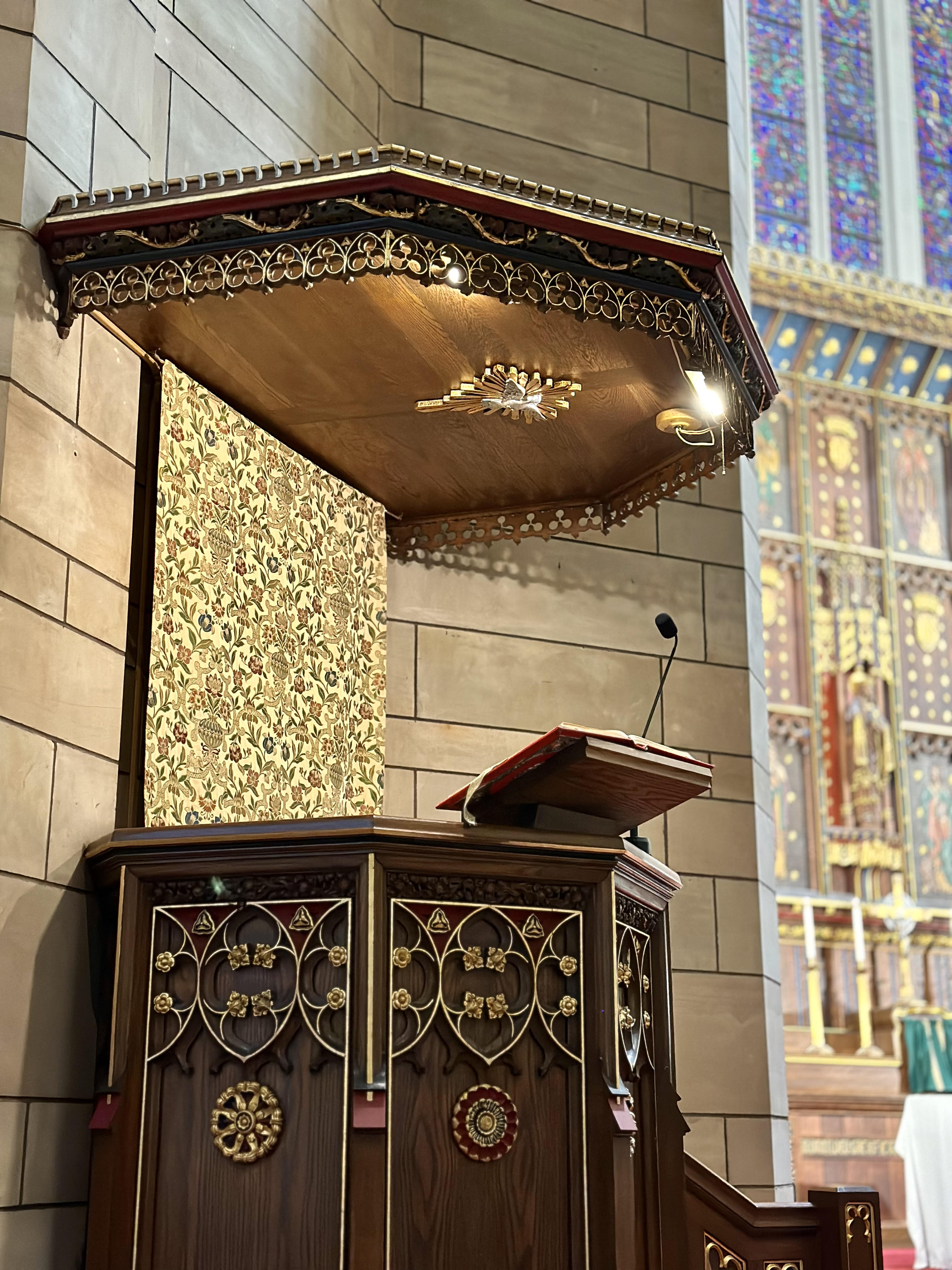
Pulpit

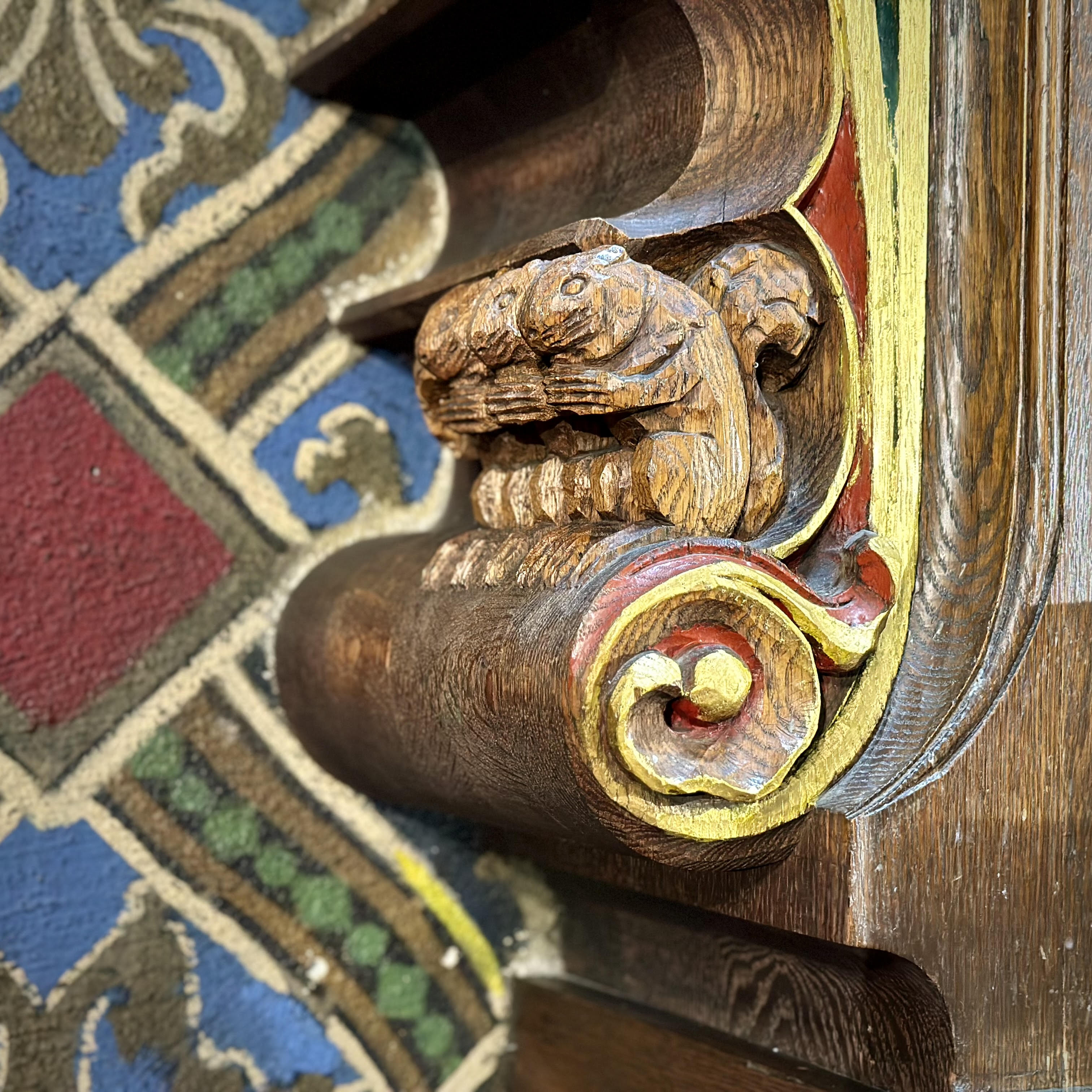
Detail of squirrels from the Saint Mark's Altarpiece

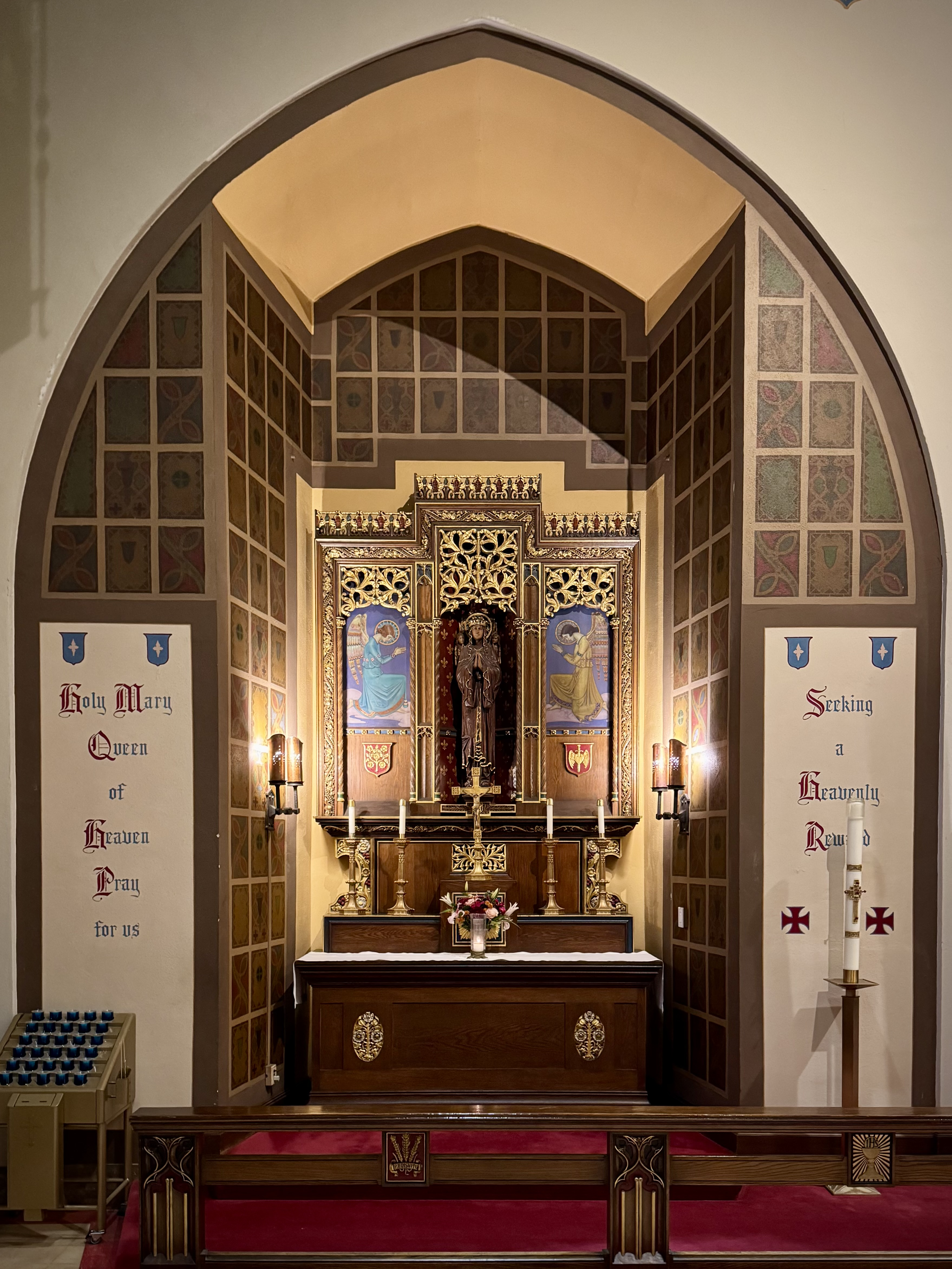
Marian Side Altar

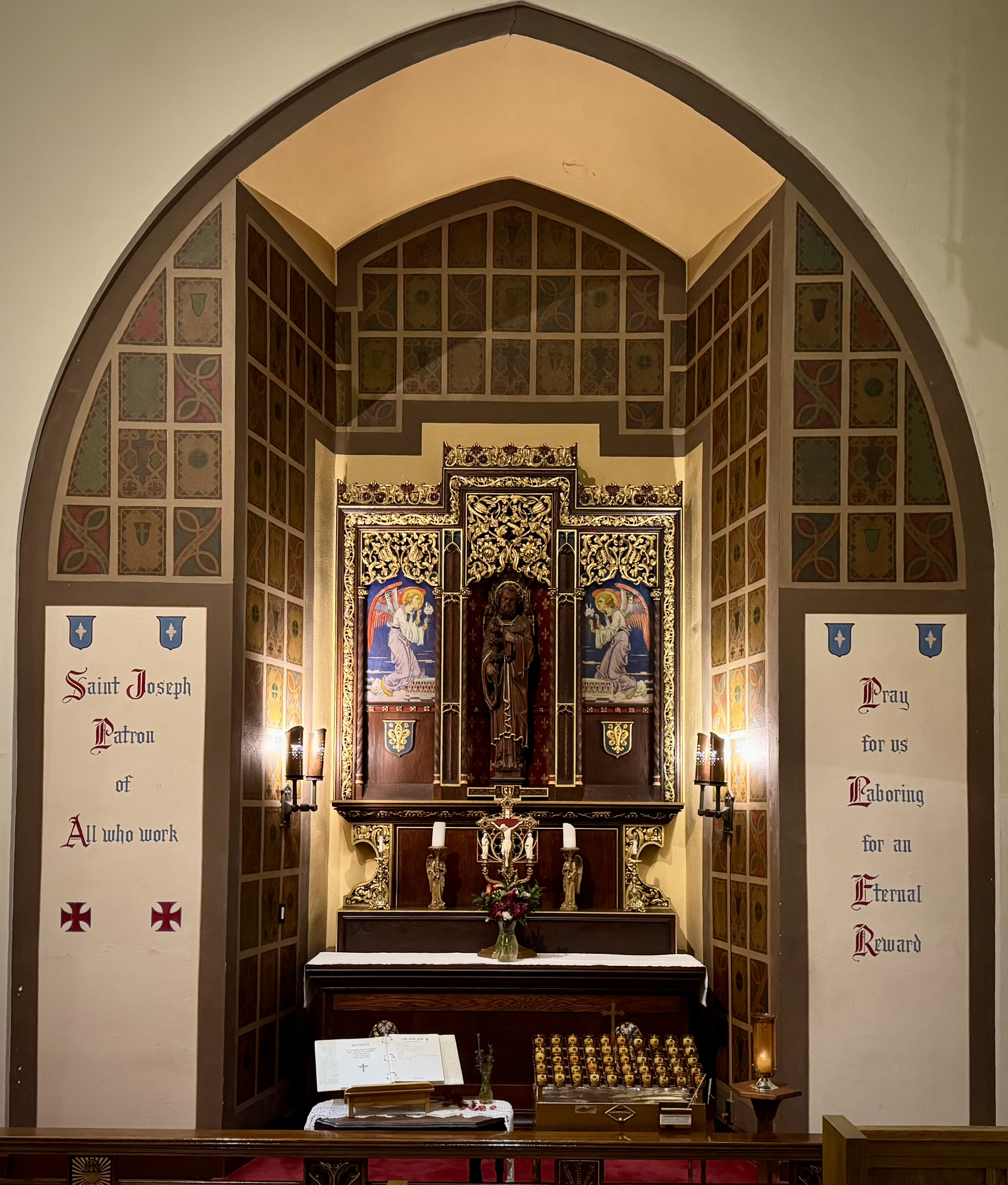
Saint Joseph Side Altar

== See also ==
- Archdiocese of Saint Paul and Minneapolis

== Sources ==
- Church of Saint Mark. "Souvenir - - Golden Jubilee". 1939.
- Corrigan, Joseph. "The History of St. Mark's and the Midway District". June 5, 1939.
- Reardon, James Michael. "The Catholic Church in the Diocese of Saint Paul". Saint Paul, MN: North Central Publishing Company. 1952.
- Laughlin, Corrina and Maria Laughlin. "In Everything, Give Thanks: A History of the Archdiocese of Saint Paul and Minneapolis". Editions du Signe. 2025.
- Wehr, Katy . "The Stained Glass Windows of the Church of St. Mark". 2025.
