= Scouting America =

Youth organization in the United States

- Legal name: Boy Scouts of America
- Age range: Cub Scouts: 5–10; Scouts BSA: 11–17; Venturing: 14–20; Exploring Club: 10–14; Sea Scouts: 14–20; Exploring Post: 14–20; Scout Leader: 18+ for Cub Scouts and Scouts BSA; 21+ for Venturing and Sea Scouting
- Headquarters: Irving, Texas
- Location: United States, Europe, Japan and South Korea
- Country: United States
- Founded: February 8, 1910; 116 years ago
- Founders: Charles Alexander Eastman; William D. Boyce; Ernest Thompson Seton; Daniel Carter Beard
- Membership: 1,030,858 youth (2025); 40,732 units (2025)
- Chief Scout Executive: Roger Krone
- National Chair: Ricky Mason
- National Commissioner: Devang Desai
- Honorary Chair: Donald Trump
- Affiliation: World Organization of the Scout Movement
- Governing body: National Executive Board
- Website scouting.org

Scouting America, legally the Boy Scouts of America, is the largest Scouting organization and one of the largest youth organizations in the United States, with over 1 million youth, including nearly 200,000 female participants. Since its founding in 1910, about 130 million Americans have participated in its programs, which are served by more than 400,000 adult volunteers. It is a founding member of the World Organization of the Scout Movement.

The stated mission of Scouting America is to "prepare young people to make ethical and moral choices over their lifetimes by instilling in them the values of the Scout Oath and Law". Youth are trained in responsible citizenship, character development, and self-reliance through participation in a wide range of outdoor activities, educational programs, and, at older age levels, career-oriented programs in partnership with community organizations. For younger members, the Scout method is part of the program to instill typical Scouting values such as trustworthiness, personal fitness, servant leadership, good citizenship, and outdoors skills through a variety of activities such as camping, aquatics, and hiking.

Scouting America owns four high adventure bases: Northern Tier (Minnesota, Manitoba, and Ontario), Philmont Scout Ranch (New Mexico), Sea Base (Florida Keys, U.S. Virgin Islands, and the Bahamas), and Summit Bechtel Reserve (West Virginia). Its local councils own hundreds of camps and reservations dedicated to scouts.

The main Scouting programs are Cub Scouts for ages 5 to 10 years, Scouts BSA for ages 11 to 17, Venturing for ages 14 through 20, and Sea Scouts for ages 14 through 20. Scouting America units are operated by chartering local organizations, such as churches, clubs, civic associations, or educational organizations, to implement the Scouting program for youth within their communities. Units are led by volunteers appointed by the chartering organization, who are supported by local councils using both paid professional Scouters and volunteers. Additionally, Learning for Life is an affiliate that provides in-school and career education. All of its programs have been open to girls since 2019, including its flagship Boy Scouts program, which was renamed to Scouts BSA. The organization began doing business as Scouting America in 2025.

== Origins ==
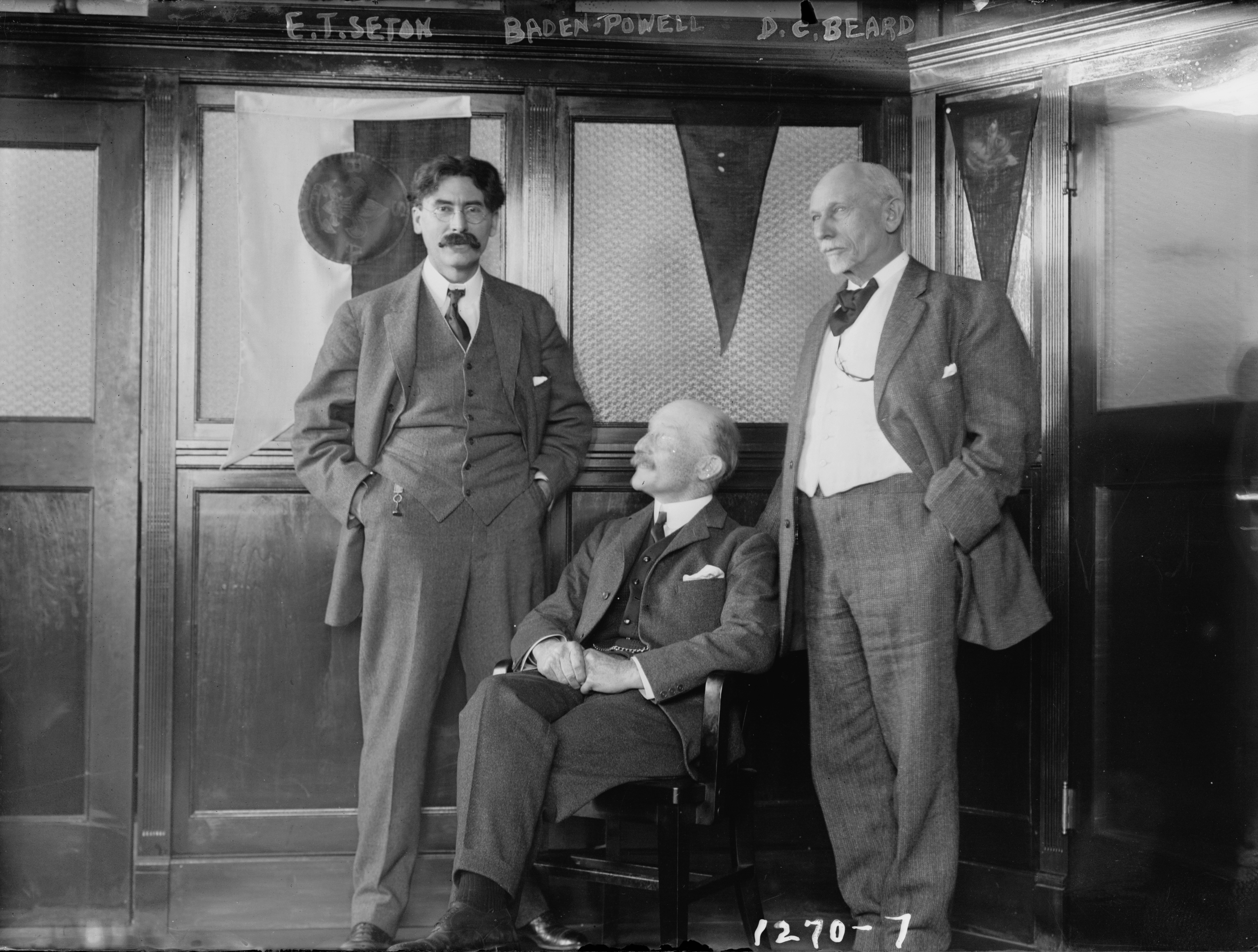
Ernest Thompson Seton (left), Baden-Powell (seated) and Dan Beard (right)

The progressive movement in the United States was at its height during the early 20th century. With the migration of families from farms to cities, there were concerns among some people that young men were no longer learning patriotism, self-reliance, and individualism. Several groups attempted to fill this void. The YMCA was an early promoter of reforms for young men with a focus on social welfare and programs of mental, physical, social and religious development. Others, included the Woodcraft Indians started by Ernest Thompson Seton in 1902 in Cos Cob, Connecticut, and the Sons of Daniel Boone founded by Daniel Carter Beard in 1905 in Cincinnati, Ohio, two notable independent scouting predecessors of Scouting America within the United States.

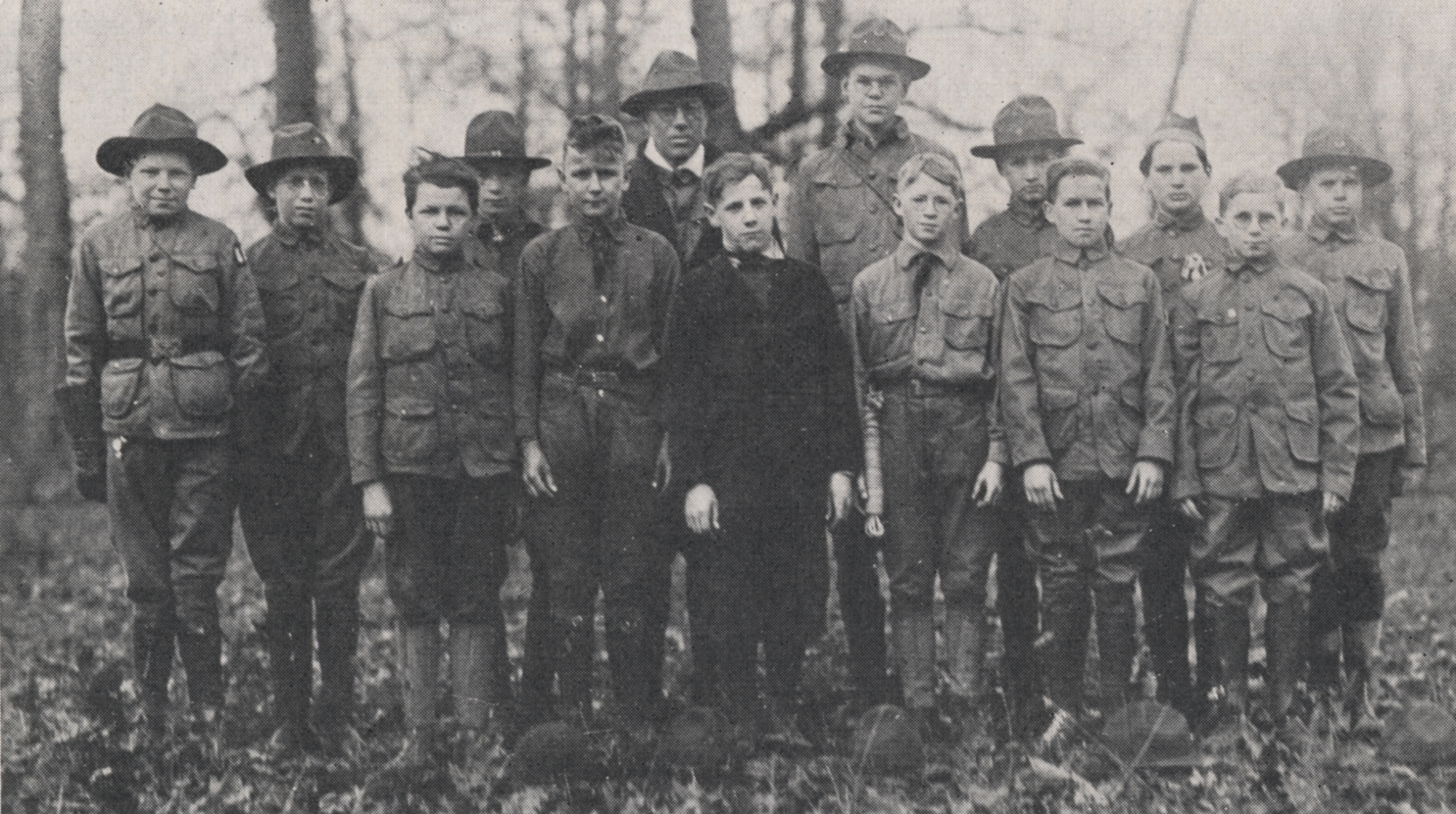
Boy Scouts, Troop 10, Columbus, Ohio, 1918

In 1907, Robert Baden-Powell founded the Scouting movement in England using elements of Seton's works among other influences. In 1909, Chicago publisher W. D. Boyce was visiting London, where he encountered a boy who came to be known as the Unknown Scout. Boyce was lost on a street when an unknown Scout came to his aid, guiding him to his destination. The boy then refused Boyce's tip, explaining that he was a Boy Scout and was merely doing his daily good turn. Interested in the Boy Scouts, Boyce met with staff at the Boy Scouts Headquarters and, by some accounts, Baden-Powell. Upon his return to the US, Boyce was inspired by his experience and incorporated the Boy Scouts of America on February 8, 1910. Edgar M. Robinson and Lee F. Hanmer became interested in the nascent BSA and convinced Boyce to turn the program over to the YMCA for development in April 1910. Robinson enlisted Seton, Beard, Charles Eastman, and other prominent leaders in the early youth movements. Former president Theodore Roosevelt, who had long complained of the decline in American manhood, became an ardent supporter. In January 1911 Robinson turned the movement over to James E. West, who became the first Chief Scout Executive, and Scouting began to expand in the US Among other programs in the US, the Woodcraft Indians and Sons of Daniel Boone eventually merged with the BSA.

Scouting America's stated purpose at its incorporation in 1910 was "to teach [boys] patriotism, courage, self-reliance, and kindred values". Later, in 1937, Deputy Chief Scout Executive George J. Fisher expressed the BSA's mission: "Each generation as it comes to maturity has no more important duty than that of teaching high ideals and proper behavior to the generation which follows." The current mission statement of Scouting America is "to prepare young people to make ethical and moral choices over their lifetimes by instilling in them the values of the Scout Oath and Law".

At its peak, Scouting America had an active membership of over 4 million youth in 1973. Today, popularity in outdoor events has waned and membership has dropped. However, Scouting America remains the largest scouting organization and one of the largest youth organizations in the United States, with about 1 million youth participants and over 400,000 adult volunteers as of 2025.

=== Federally chartered corporation ===
The purposes of the corporation are to promote, through organization, and cooperation with other agencies, the ability of boys to do things for themselves and others, to train them in scoutcraft, and to teach them patriotism, courage, self-reliance, and kindred virtues, using the methods that were in common use by boy scouts on June 15, 1916.

— 36 U.S.C. § 30902

Scouting America holds one of the comparatively rare congressional charters under Title 36 of the United States Code. On behalf of the Boy Scouts of America, Paul Sleman, Colin H. Livingstone, Ernest S. Martin, and James E. West successfully lobbied Congress for a federal charter, which President Woodrow Wilson signed on June 15, 1916. One of the principal reasons for seeking a congressional charter was to deal with competition from other Scout organizations including the United States Boy Scouts and the Lone Scouts of America. The 1916 statute of incorporation established this institution among a small number of similarly chartered patriotic and national organizations, such as the Girl Scouts, Civil Air Patrol, the American Legion, the Red Cross, Little League Baseball, and the National Academy of Sciences. The federal incorporation was originally construed primarily as an honor; however, it does grant the chartered organization some special privileges and rights, including freedom from antitrust and monopoly regulation and complete control over the organization's symbols and insignia. However, it neither implies nor accords Congress any special control over Scouting America, which remains free to function independently.

== Membership ==
=== Main programs ===
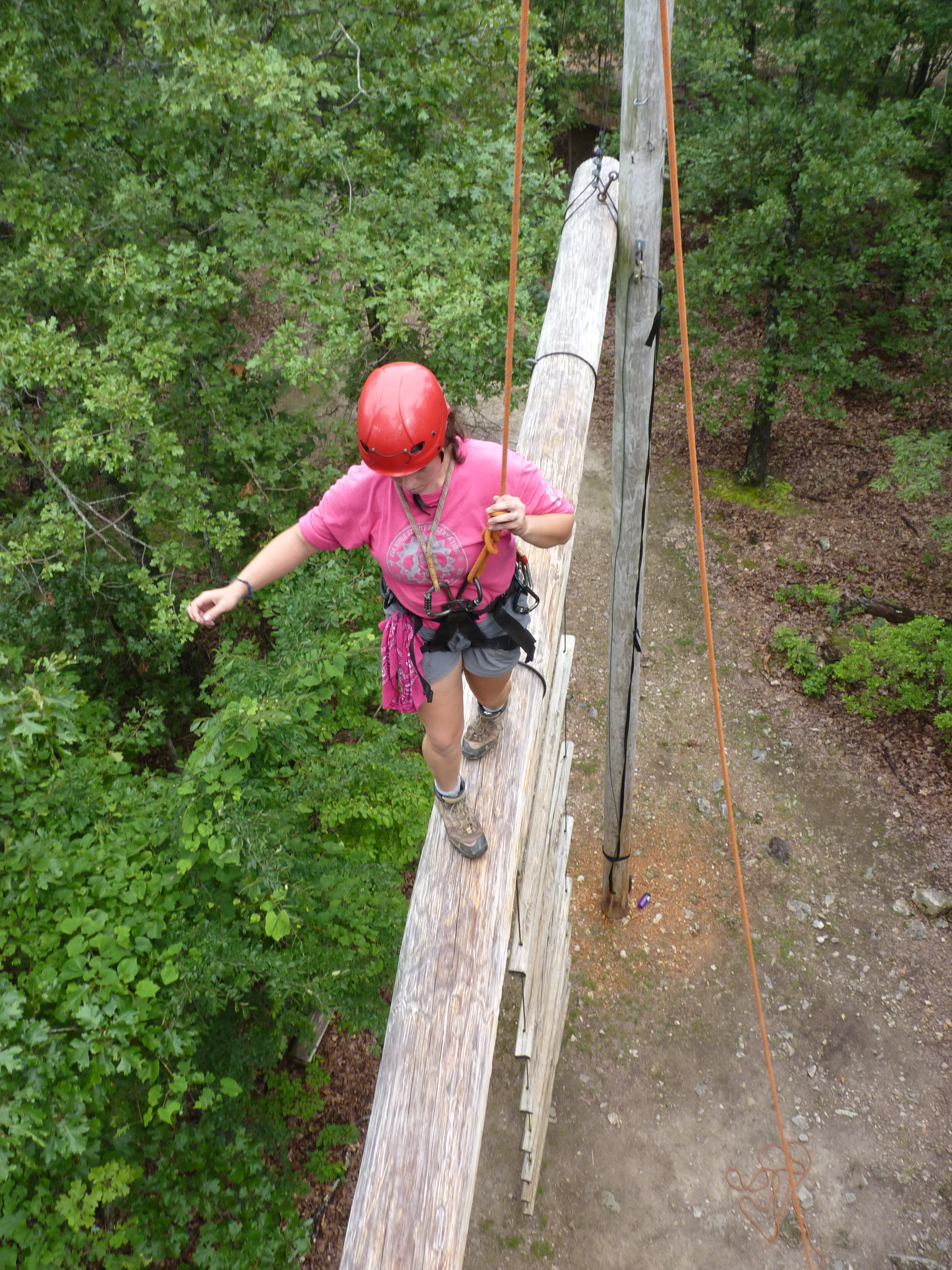
A Venturer traverses a COPE High Ropes course.

Scouting America uses four primary programs to achieve its aims in Scouting:

- Cub Scouting is available to children from kindergarten through fifth grade.
- Scouts BSA (formerly Boy Scouts) is the flagship program of Scouting America for youth ages 11 to 17; 10-year-olds can join after March 1 of their fifth grade year or if they have earned the Arrow of Light award.
- Venturing is the program for ages 14 to 20.
- Sea Scouting is the program for ages 14 to 20 focused on nautical activities.

There are about 100,000 physically or mentally disabled Scouts throughout the United States. Anyone certified as disabled "may enroll in Scouting and remain in its program beyond the regulation age limits. This provision allows all members to advance in Scouting as far as they wish."

=== Other programs ===
Scouting America offers several other programs and subprograms beyond regular membership:

- The Order of the Arrow is the organization's honor society for experienced campers, dedicated to the ideals of brotherhood and cheerful service. To be considered for membership one must live their life by the Scout Law, accomplish several requirements, and be elected by members of their unit.
- Lone Scouting is a program designed to allow those who would otherwise not be able to become Scouts or Cub Scouts—usually due to residence in an overseas/isolated community or unusual circumstances—to participate in the Scouting experience.
- STEM Scouts is a pilot program of Scouting America that focuses on STEM learning and career development for boys and girls in elementary, middle, and high school.
- Learning for Life is a school and work-site based program that is a subsidiary of Scouting America. It utilizes programs designed for schools and community-based organizations that are designed to prepare youth for the complexities of contemporary society and to enhance their self-confidence, motivation, and self-esteem. Exploring is the worksite-based program of Learning for Life with programs based on five areas of emphasis: career opportunities, life skills, citizenship, character education, and leadership experience. Learning for Life is not considered a regular Scouting program; it does not use the Scout Oath, Scout Law, uniforms, or insignia of regular Scouting. All Learning for Life programs are open to youth and adults without restriction based on gender, residence, sexual orientation, or other considerations other than age requirements.

=== Membership controversies ===
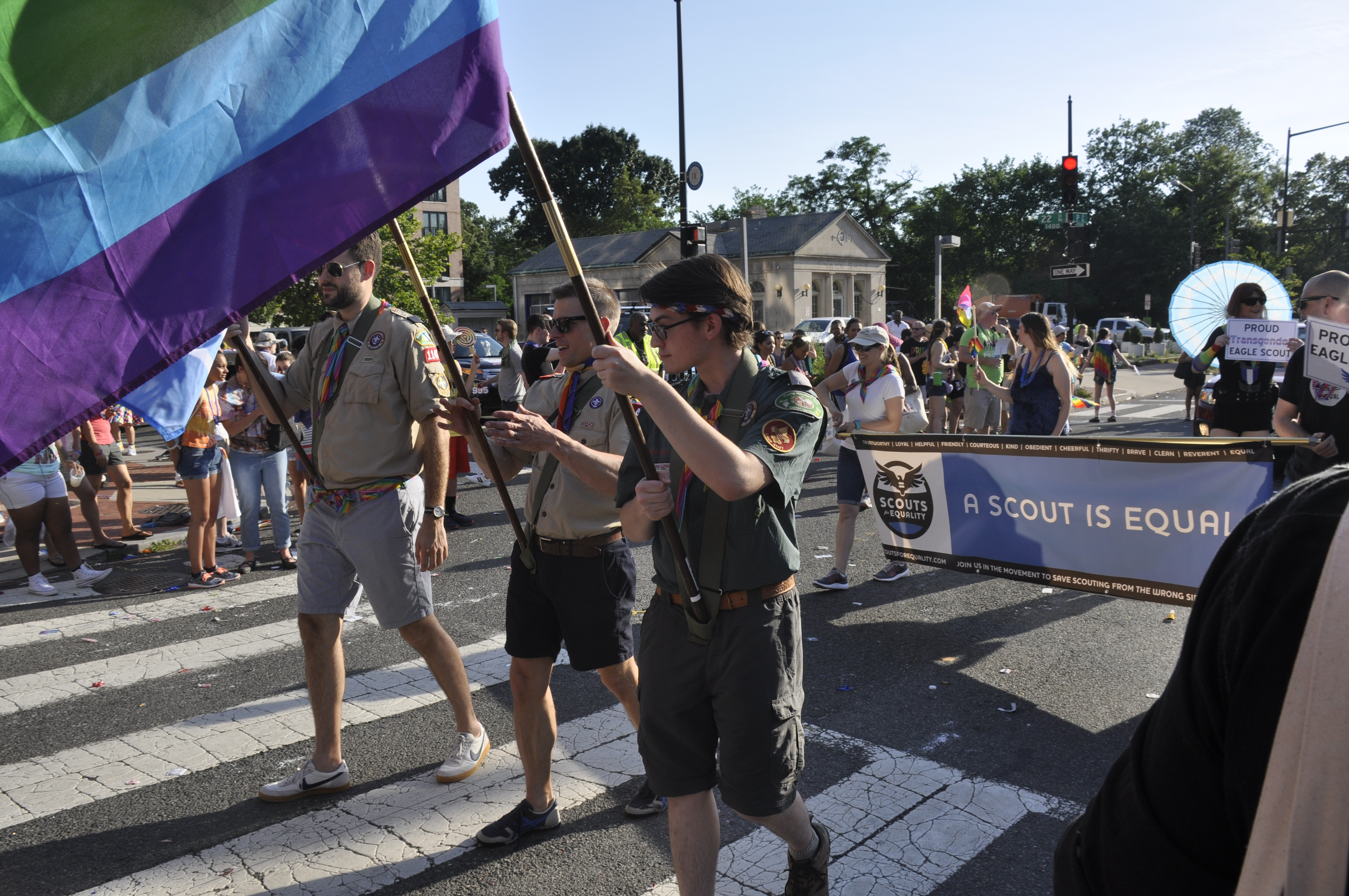
LGBT Boy Scouts and their supporters at 2017 Capital Pride parade carrying flags and A Scout is equal sign

==== Historic participation of women ====
Unlike Learning for Life, membership in the regular Scouting America programs had been more restricted and controversial. Until the late 2010s, Cub Scouting or the program then-named Boy Scouting was open to boys only, but girls were permitted to join the Venturing, Sea Scouting, and Explorers programs in 1970. Women could also serve as adult volunteers in all programs in approximately the same time frame. On October 11, 2017, Scouting America announced that girls would be allowed to become Cub Scouts, starting in 2018, and be in the Scouts BSA program, starting on February 1, 2019.

==== Religion ====
Scouting America's religious requirements of its members have been controversial and inconsistent. Many volunteers within the organization have welcomed atheist and agnostic scouts. However, in 2018, the Boy Scouts of America National Executive Board "reaffirm[ed] its unequivocal commitment to the Declaration of Religious Principle as a fundamental component of the mission of the Boy Scouts of America". At the same meeting, it also stated that "[t]he recognition of God as the ruling and leading power in the universe and the grateful acknowledgement of His favors and blessings are necessary to the best type of citizenship and are wholesome precepts in the education of the growing members". Despite this, the BSA has had Buddhist troops since 1920, although Buddhism is a nontheistic religion which does not assert belief in a creator God. The BSA also signed a Memorandum of Understanding with the Unitarian Universalist Association in 2016 which specifically gives ultimate authority over a participant's spiritual welfare to the individual Unitarian Universalist congregation. The MOU also specifically includes within Unitarian Universalist chartered troops humanism as an acceptable form of spirituality as well as Earth-centered religions.

==== Sexuality ====
For decades, the BSA had no policies explicitly excluding members on the grounds of their sexuality, but as more Scouts came out, the association began writing policies against letting gay people participate. The first policies were created at least as early as 1978, and banned "avowed or known homosexuals". One of the first challenges was lodged in 1980 by an Eagle Scout who was barred from becoming an assistant scoutmaster after the BSA learned he had attended prom with another boy. During the 1990s the BSA continued fighting legal battles over the participation of gay men while other scouting organizations like the Girl Scouts of the USA, the British Scout Association, and Scouts Canada increased inclusion of gay members and leaders. In 2000, the Supreme Court ruled in Boy Scouts of America v. Dale that Boy Scouts and all similar, private voluntary organizations have the constitutionally protected right under the First Amendment of freedom of association to set membership standards. In 2004, the BSA adopted a new policy statement, including a "Youth Leadership" policy that disallowed members to continue in leadership positions if they held themselves as "open and avowed homosexuals".

At the Scouts annual meeting in April 2012, a leader from the Northeast presented a resolution that "would allow individual units to accept gays as adult leaders". However, in July 2012, at the culmination of a review started in 2010, an 11-person committee convened by the BSA reached a "unanimous consensus" recommending retaining the gay-exclusion policy. Intel, UPS, and Merck cut financial ties with Scouting America over this decision. Within the BSA National Executive Board, the members James Turley, CEO of Ernst & Young, and Randall Stephenson, CEO of AT&T and who was then "on track to become president of the Scout's national board in 2014", and later did become president, publicly opposed the policy and stated their intention "to work from within the BSA Board to actively encourage dialogue and sustainable progress" in changing the policy. On January 28, 2013, the BSA announced it was considering rescinding the ban on homosexuals, allowing chartered organizations to determine local policy.

On May 23, 2013, over 60% of the 1,400-member BSA National Council voted to remove the restriction denying membership to youth on the basis of sexual orientation while emphasizing that any sexual conduct, whether heterosexual or homosexual, is not allowed. The resolution went into effect on January 1, 2014, but Scout leaders who were "open and avowed homosexuals" were still prohibited. The policy specifically states that BSA does not inquire into a person's sexuality. Gay rights groups hailed the decision, but vowed to press on until all gay members were accepted. Some churches and conservative members threatened to quit the Boy Scouts in response. On June 12, 2013, the Southern Baptist Convention passed non-binding resolutions urging the BSA not to change their policy. In September 2013, a new scouting group called Trail Life USA was created, in support of what founders call "traditional, Christian" scouting. Subsequently, some Christian denomination congregations replaced their Boy Scouts of America troops with those of Trail Life USA.

In May 2015, Boy Scouts of America President Robert Gates said it was time to end the ban on gay leaders. Gates said it "cannot be sustained" any longer. On July 10, 2015, the Executive Committee agreed, and referred the matter to the National Executive Board. On July 27, 2015, the Boy Scouts of America National Executive Board voted to lift the organization's blanket ban on openly gay leaders and employees. Local chartering organizations are still permitted to set their own standards based on religious principle for selecting the adult volunteers for their unit.

==== Gender ====
On January 30, 2017, the organization announced that transgender children who identify as boys would be allowed to enroll in boys-only programs, effective immediately. Previously, the sex listed on an applicant's birth certificate determined eligibility for these programs; going forward, the decision would be based on the gender listed on the application. Joe Maldonado became the first openly transgender child identifying as a boy to join the Scouts on February 7, 2017. He had been rejected from the Boy Scouts in 2016 for being transgender, but the policy was changed after his story became nationally known.

On October 11, 2017, the organization announced that girls would be welcomed into Cub Scouts beginning in late 2018, with an early adopter program beginning on January 15, 2018, in councils that wished to participate early. The announcement included the statement that girls in Cub Scouting will simply be called "Cub Scouts". The flagship program of Boy Scouts of America, previously known as "Boy Scouting", became known as Scouts BSA on February 1, 2019, when the program opened to girls. Members of Scouts BSA are known as "Scouts". On November 6, 2018, the Girl Scouts organization filed a federal trademark lawsuit seeking to block the BSA from rebranding itself simply as "Scouts"; the two organizations had previously litigated the use of the term scout. In July 2022, the two organizations settled the lawsuit with no damages, agreeing to cooperate on trademark matters in the future.

On May 7, 2024, the Boy Scouts of America announced that it would begin doing business as Scouting America, while retaining its legal name. The name change officially went into effect on February 8, 2025, the 115th anniversary of the organization. The Scout Oath, Law and program remain unchanged; the uniforms also remain the same but are embroidered with the new name. The change does not affect the name of the organization's flagship program, Scouts BSA, which was renamed from Boy Scouts in 2019.

== Program ==
=== Aims, methods, and ideals ===
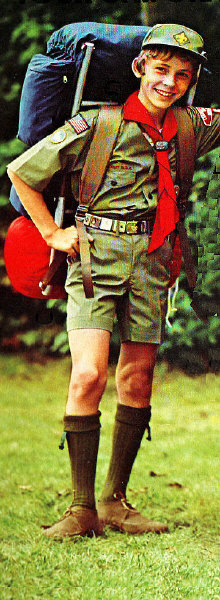
Boy Scout, 1974, wearing uniform of the time

"On my honor, I will do my best, to do my duty, to God and my country, and to obey the Scout Law, to help other people at all times, to keep myself physically strong, mentally awake, and morally straight." -Scout Oath

"A Scout is trustworthy, loyal, helpful, friendly, courteous, kind, obedient, cheerful, thrifty, brave, clean, and reverent." -Scout Law

Boy Scouts of America (1921), a silent film by Vitalux Movies outlining various practices in the BSA program

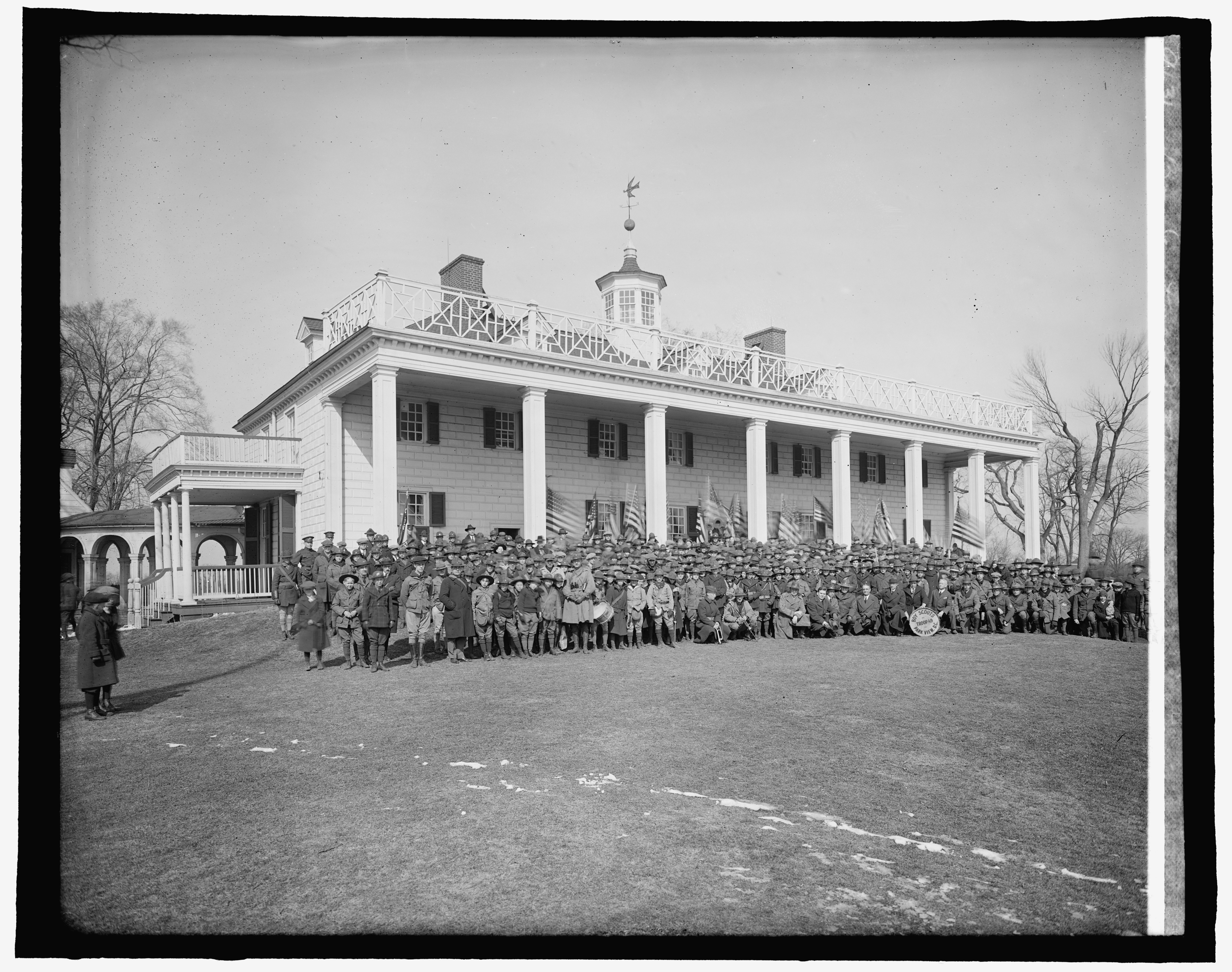
Boy Scouts Troop at Mount Vernon, Virginia, 1910s

The objectives of Scouting America are referred to as the Aims and Methods of Scouting: Character, Citizenship, Personal Fitness, Leadership. Scouting America pursues these aims through an informal education system called the Scout method, with variations that are designed to be appropriate for the age and maturity of each membership division.

Cub Scouts wear a uniform that gives each Scout a level of identity within the den, the pack and the community. The Scouts learn teamwork by meeting and working together in a den of four to ten boys or girls under adult leadership. They learn and apply the ideals codified in the Scout Oath and the Scout Law through an advancement system using age-based ranks earned by completing required and elective adventures. Some advancement is done in the home and is intended to involve the entire family and many Cub Scout activities include family members.

In the Scouts BSA program, Scouts learn to use the ideals spelled out in the Scout Oath, the Scout Law, the Outdoor Code, the Scout motto ("Be prepared"), and the Scout slogan ("Do a good turn daily"). They wear a uniform and work together in patrols of four to ten Scouts with an elected patrol leader, who then appoints an assistant patrol leader. Scouts share responsibilities, apply skills learned at meetings and live together in the outdoors. The advancement system provides opportunities for personal growth and self-reliance. Scouts interact with adult leaders who act as role models and mentors, but they are expected to plan their own activities within the troop and to participate in community service.

Venturers are expected to know and live by the Scout Oath and Law. Before May 2014, members of the Venturing program followed the now discontinued Venturing Oath and Venturing Code. Venturers associate and work directly with adult advisors, but the crew is led by elected youth officers who are given opportunities to learn and apply leadership skills. Venturers plan and participate in interdependent group experiences dependent on cooperation. An emphasis on high adventure provides opportunities for team-building and practical leadership applications. A series of awards provide opportunities for recognition and personal growth. Each award requires the Venturer to teach what they have learned to others, thereby returning the skill and knowledge back to the community and enabling the Venturer to master those skills.

In October 2012, the National Council announced that, as a result of the findings and recommendations of a select committee made up of volunteer Scouters, the Cub Scout and Venturing programs would transition to use of the Scout Oath and Law, and in the case of the Venturers, the Boy Scout three-finger salute and sign as well. The Venturing change occurred in May 2014; and the Cub Scout change in mid-2015.

=== Ranks ===
There are seven ranks that a Scout in the Scouts BSA program may attain (note that Eagle Palms are not considered ranks). To obtain a rank, a Scout must complete the requirements for that rank, as well as have a Scoutmaster Conference and a Board of Review (with the exception of Scout Rank). To obtain a rank you must first acquire the rank previous to it, with the exception of Scout rank in which a Scout can earn at anytime once they have completed the requirements for it. The ranks are in the following order: Scout, Tenderfoot, Second Class, First Class, Star Scout, Life Scout, and Eagle Scout. An increasing number of merit badges, as well as being in troop leadership positions, is required for the latter 3 ranks, plus other requirements. Certain ranks require specific merit badges and leadership positions.

=== Eagle Scout ===
The Eagle Scout rank badge

Eagle Scout is the highest rank one can receive in Scouts BSA. Since its introduction in 1911, the Eagle Scout rank has been earned by more than two million youth. Requirements include earning at least 21 merit badges and demonstrating Scout Spirit through the Scout Oath and Law, service, and leadership, all before or by age 18. This includes an extensive service project that the Scout plans, organizes, leads, and manages. Eagle Scouts are presented with a medal and a badge that visibly recognizes the accomplishments of the Scout. Additional recognition can be earned through Eagle Palms, awarded for completing additional tenure, leadership, and merit badge requirements.

=== National Scout jamboree ===
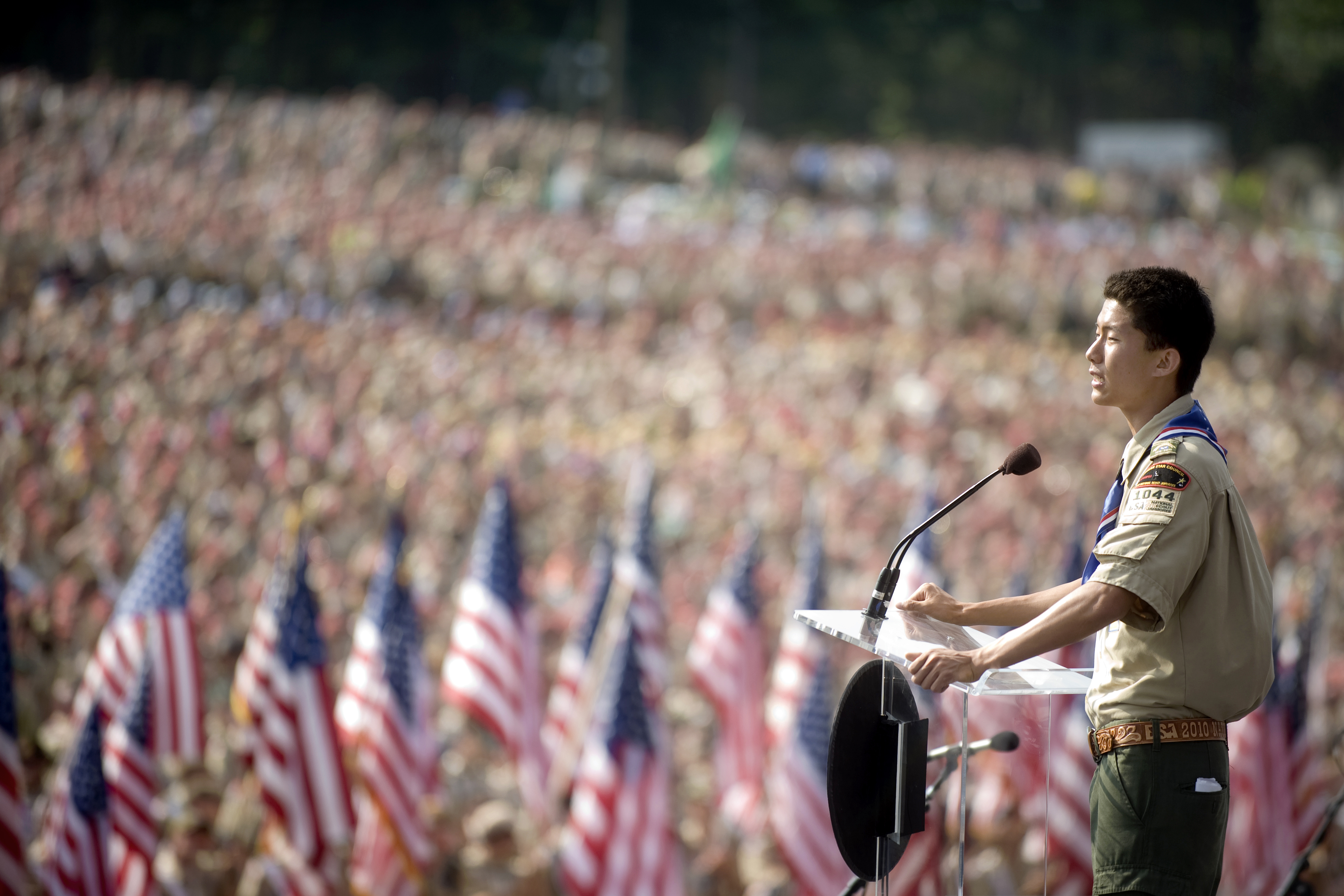
Anthony Thomas, the two millionth Eagle Scout, addresses a crowd of over 45,000 Scouts at the 2010 National Scout Jamboree, held at Fort A.P. Hill, Virginia.

The National Scout Jamboree is a gathering of Scouts and Venturers from across the US. It is usually held every four years, with some adjustment for special years such as the 2010 National Scout Jamboree that celebrated Scouting America centennial. The first jamboree was held in 1937 at the Washington Monument in Washington, D.C. There were 27,232 Scouts and Leaders present at the first National Jamboree. In 1950, the Boy Scouts of America hosted their second National Jamboree at Valley Forge, Pennsylvania. The event was to commemorate the organization's 40th anniversary. Since then, jamborees have been held in varying locations. From 1981 until 2010, the jamboree was held at Fort A.P. Hill, Virginia. A permanent location owned by Scouting America was sought in 2008 for future jamborees, high adventure programs and training. The Summit Bechtel Family National Scout Reserve near Beckley, West Virginia, became the permanent site beginning with the 2013 National Scout Jamboree.

=== High adventure ===
Scouting America operates several high-adventure bases at the national level. Each offers a wide range of programs and training; a typical core program may include sailing, wilderness canoeing or wilderness backpacking and camping trips. These bases are administered by the High Adventure Division of the National Council.

The high-adventure bases of Scouting America are Philmont Scout Ranch, Northern Tier National High Adventure Bases, Sea Base, and The Summit Bechtel Family National Scout Reserve.

Boy Scouts of the Wildcat Patrol

=== Training ===
Scouting America offers a wide variety of mandatory and optional training programs in youth protection, outdoor skills and leadership.

==== Adult leader training ====
Every adult leader must complete Youth Protection Training. Position-specific training is also required for all direct-contact leaders. Upon completion of basic training, a leader may wear the Trained emblem on his/her Scouting America uniform.

Supplemental skill-specific training is also available to Scouting America volunteers to gain knowledge in outdoors skills including camping, hiking, first aid, Leave No Trace, swim safety, climbing safety, hazardous weather, and other skills.

The highest level of Scouting America training is Wood Badge, focused on helping participants develop leadership skills while participating in an outdoor program over five days. Some councils offer high-adventure training for adults using the Powder Horn program. Leaders can also take the Seabadge advanced leadership and management course.

==== Youth leadership training ====
Scout youth leaders may attend the unit-level Introduction to Leadership Skills for Troops. Local councils offer the advanced National Youth Leadership Training and the National Council offers the National Advanced Youth Leadership Experience conducted at Philmont Training Center. Scouting America also offers the NYLT Leadership Academy which trains youth staff members from across the country for council-level NYLT courses.

Venturers and Sea Scouts may attend the unit-level Introduction to Leadership Skills for Crews or Introduction to Leadership Skills for Ships. Crew officers can attend Crew Officer Orientation, and then a council-provided Kodiak leadership training program.

Order of the Arrow members may attend the National Leadership Seminar, run multiple times each year by each region.

==== National Camping School ====
Scouting America operates a National Camping School program which trains people how to run various departments or areas at resident camps. Some online training is offered, but most areas require an in-person week-long training program at one of the National Camping Schools. After successfully completing a week-long program, a person is entitled to wear the National Camping School patch. The regular-size patch may be worn on the right breast shirt pocket, in the temporary patch spot. National Camping School certification is valid for five years.

==== COPE ====
COPE, which stands for Challenging Outdoor Personal Experience, is a program that consists of a series of tests of strength, agility, coordination, and problem-solving, individually and within groups.

=== Outdoor program ===
Scouts see nature as an adventurous place, and it is expected that when they get older the experience from their youth will make them nature lovers. Scouts envisage nature as a heritage.

"On breaking up camp leave two things behind you: 1. Nothing. 2. Your thanks." — Lord Baden-Powell in 1919.

== Organization ==
=== National Council ===
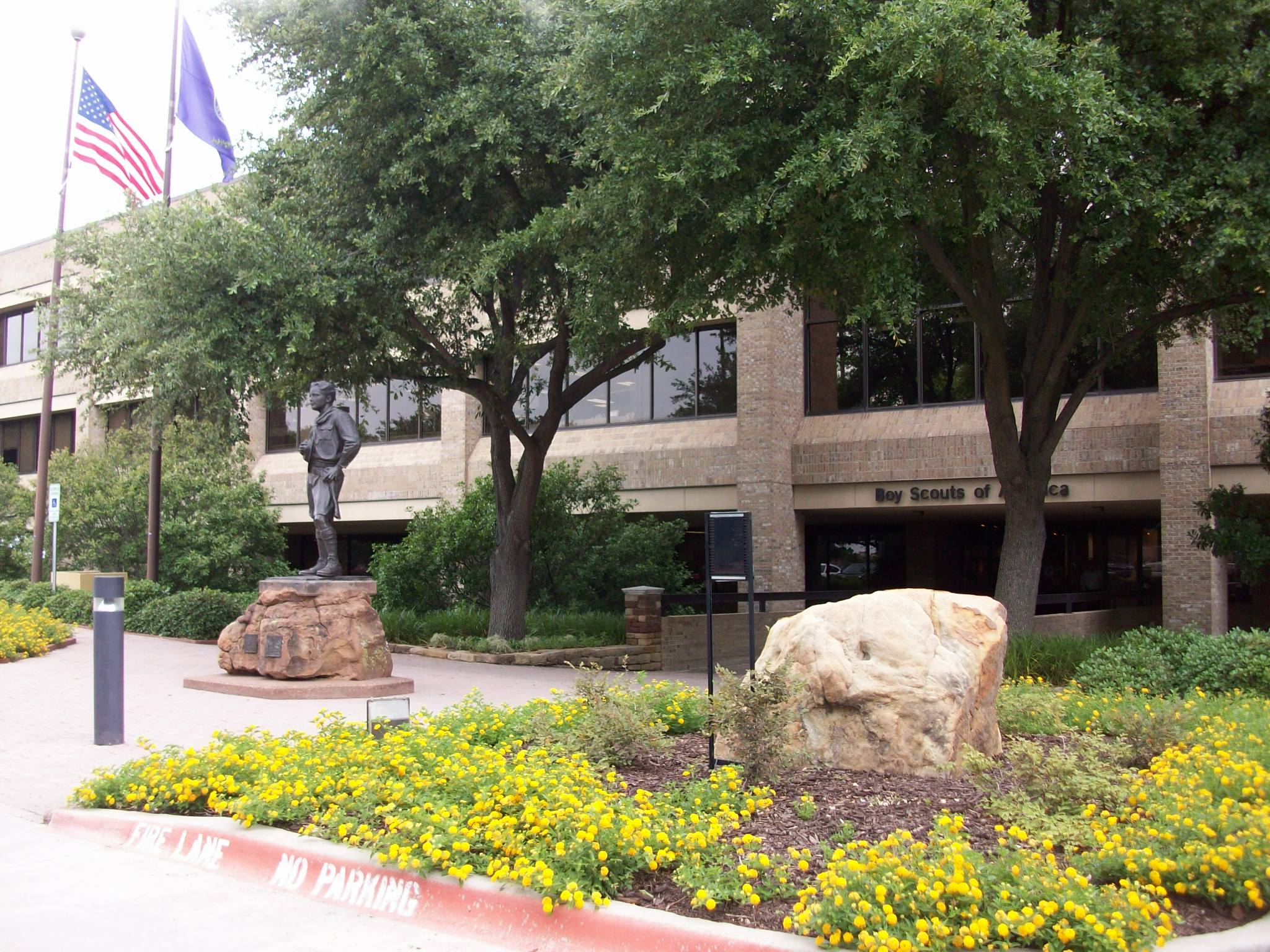
Scouting America National Office in Irving, Texas

The National Council is the corporate membership of Scouting America and consists of volunteer Scouters who meet annually. The day-to-day operations of the National Council are administered by the Chief Scout Executive and other national professional staff. National Council members include volunteers who are elected national officers and executive board members, regional presidents, the local council representatives, members at large, and honorary members. The national headquarters has been in Irving, Texas since 1979.

Beginning with William Howard Taft in 1910, the president of the United States has served as the organization's honorary chair.

=== Governance and the National Executive Board ===
The Scouting America National Executive Board governs the organization. The 2015 National Executive Board consisted of 79 members.

The board is led by the national president, a volunteer elected by the National Council. Board members included regular elected members, regional presidents, and up to five appointed youth members. The Chief Scout Executive is the board secretary and non-voting member. The National Executive Board has a number of standing committees that correspond to the professional staff organization of the National Council.

Present and past members of the National Executive Board include Utah Senator Mitt Romney, Ernst & Young CEO Jim Turley and AT&T CEO Randall Stephenson. Other members included Latter-day Saint Church President Thomas S. Monson.

=== National Service Territories ===
For administrative purposes, Scouting America is divided into sixteen National Service Territories (NSTs) including international areas for scouts with parents serving outside the US. Each NST encompasses multiple states or portions of states/counties.

Until 2021, Scouting America was divided into four regions for administrative purposes—Central, Southern, Western, Northeast.

=== Local councils ===
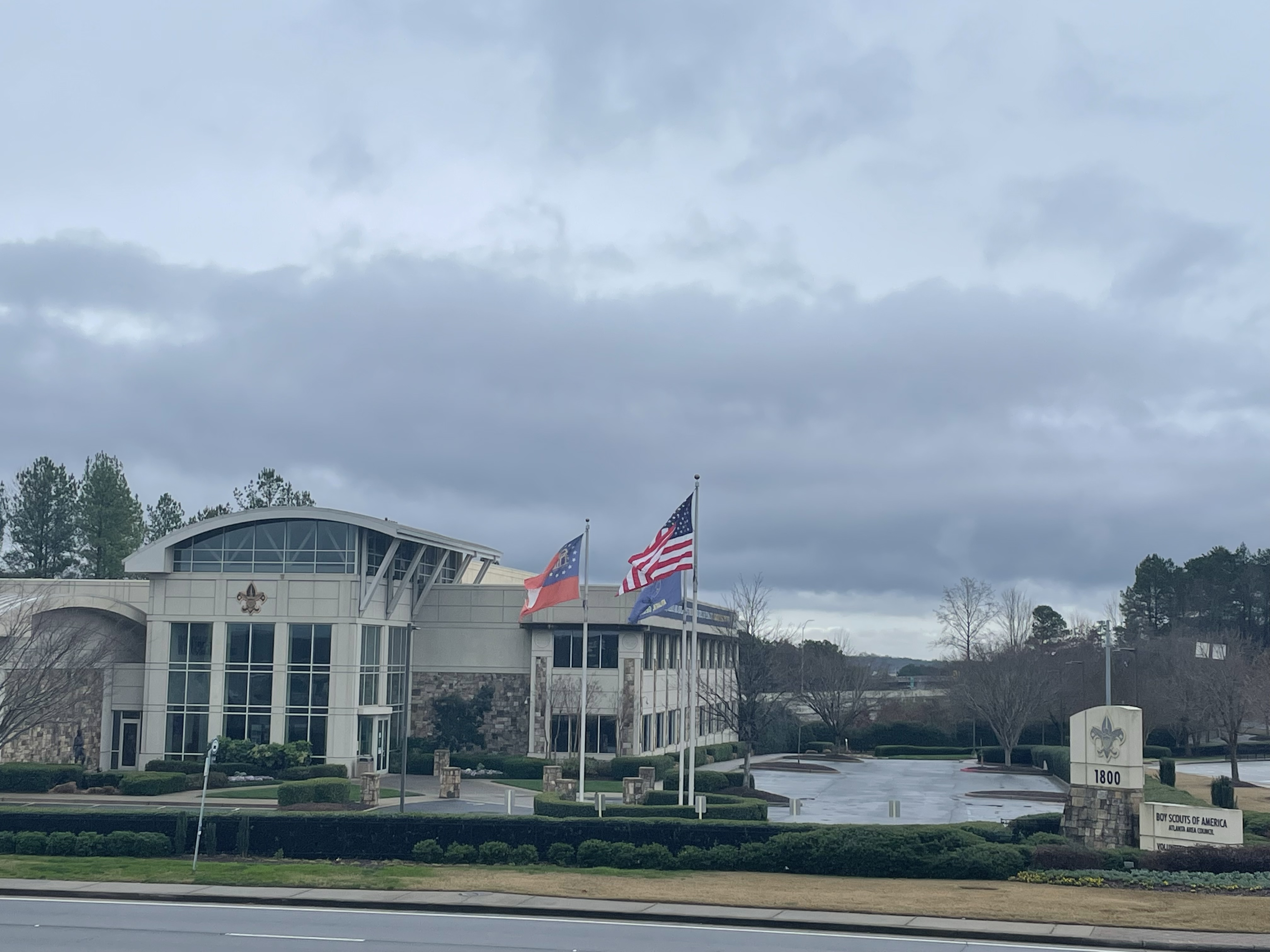
Boy Scouts of America Atlanta, Georgia Area Council headquarters

The Scouting America program is administered through 242 local councils, each covering a geopolitical area that may vary from a single city to an entire state. Councils receive an annual charter from the National Council and are usually incorporated as a charitable organization.

The council level organization is similar to that of the National Council. The council executive board is headed by the council president and is made up of annually elected local community leaders. The board establishes the council program and carries out the resolutions, policies, and activities of the council. Board members serve without pay and some are volunteer Scouters working at the unit level. Youth members may be elected to the council executive board according to the council by-laws.

The Scout executive manages council operations—including finance, property management, advancement and awards, registrations, and Scout Shop sales—with a staff of other professionals and para-professionals. Volunteer commissioners lead the unit service functions of the council, help maintain the standards of Scouting America, and assure a healthy unit program.

Scouting America also charters two councils operating overseas, largely serving military base and diplomatic community families in Europe and Asia. The Transatlantic Council, headquartered in Italy, serves Scouting America units in Europe and Africa; the Far East Council, headquartered in Japan, serves units across Asia. The Aloha Council in Hawaii also serves Scouting America units in the American territories of American Samoa, Guam, the Northern Mariana Islands and the countries of the Federated States of Micronesia, the Marshall Islands, and Palau.

The Greater New York Councils are unique in that they are divided into five boroughs with each led by a borough Scout executive and each borough then divided into districts.

Councils are divided into districts with leadership provided by the district executive, district chairman, and the district commissioner. Districts are directly responsible for the operation of Scouting units and, except for the district executive, are mostly staffed with volunteers. The voting members of each district consist of volunteer representatives from each chartered organization having at least one Scouting America unit, plus annually elected members-at-large who in turn elect the district chairman. Boroughs and districts are subdivisions of the local council and do not have a separate corporate status.

=== Chartered organizations and units ===
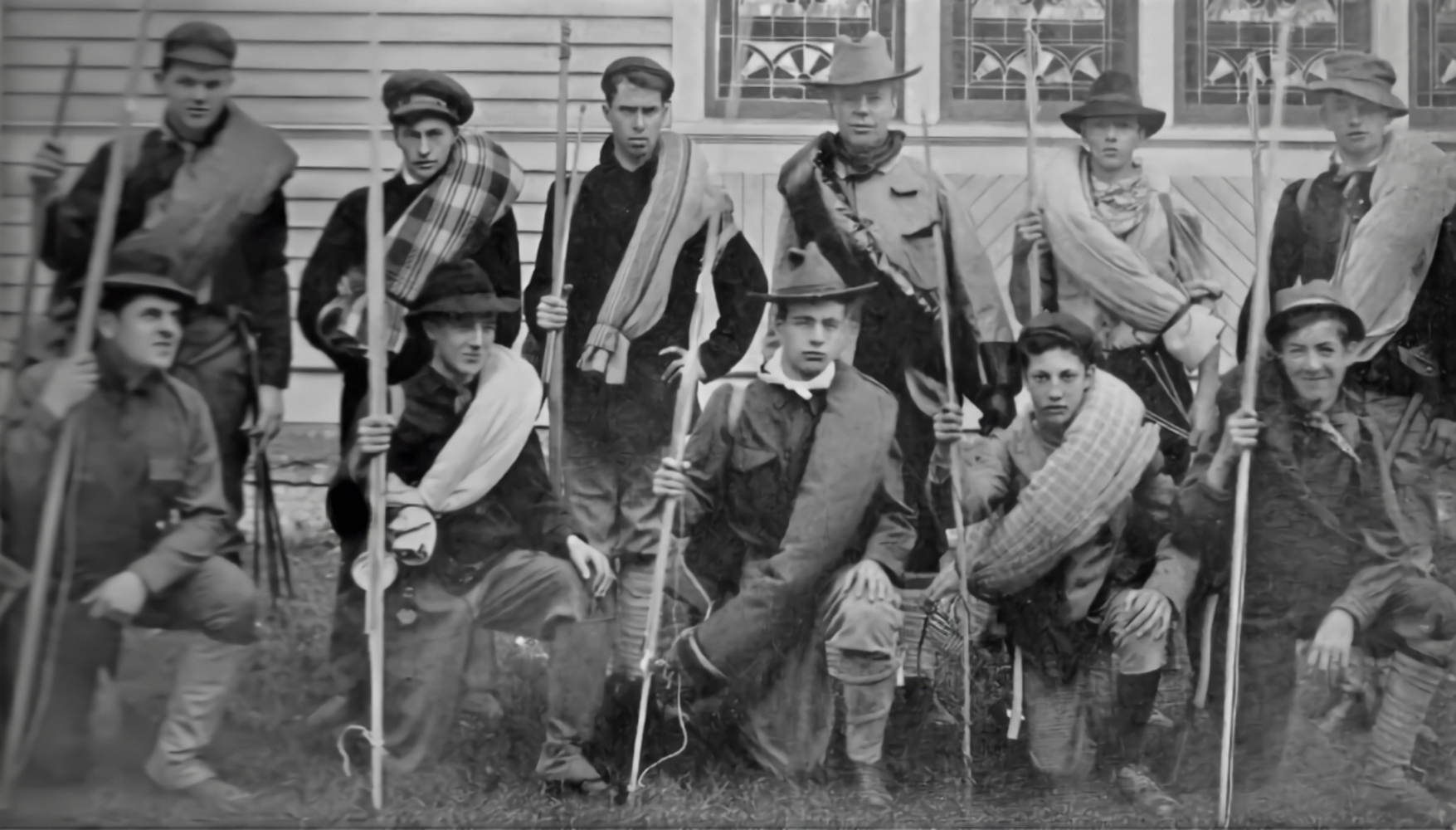
Scouts of the first chartered troop from the Catholic parish church Saint Mark in Saint Paul, Minnesota, 1910

Scouting America partners with community organizations, such as religious congregations, fraternal groups, service clubs, and other community associations, to provide the Scouting program for the particular neighborhood or community in which the particular organization wishes to reach out to youth and families. The connection with religious congregations stems back to at least 1910, when a Catholic parish church in Saint Paul, Minnesota chartered the first troop in the city.

Organizations hold charters issued by Scouting America and are known then as chartered organizations. Each chartered organization provides the meeting place for Scouting America youth, oversees the volunteer leaders, and agrees to follow the basic Scouting America safety policies and values-based program, and the organization is considered the "owner" of its local program, much like a franchise.

Within each chartered organization, there may be one or more "units". A unit is a group of youth and adults who are collectively designated as a Cub Scout pack, Scouts BSA troop, Venturing crew, or Sea Scout ship. Each chartered organization may charter as many units as it wishes, but usually only 3 or 4 (one unit for each program level). Scouting America councils provide the leader training, inter-unit activities, camping programs, volunteer and professional support, and insurance coverage. Units also create their own activities (such as monthly camping trips, outings, or service projects), and most meet weekly at the place of the chartered organization for youth to learn basic skill development and practice leadership in small groups known as dens and patrols.

The Church of Jesus Christ of Latter-day Saints was the first partner to sponsor Scouting in the United States. It adopted the program in 1913 as part of its Mutual Improvement Association program for young men, and it was the largest single sponsor of Scouting until it ceased sponsoring Scouting units at the end of 2019.

=== Leadership ===
In all Scouting units above the Cub Scout pack (i.e. units serving adolescent Scouts), leadership of the unit comprises both adult leaders (Scouters) and youth leaders (Scouts). In fact, this is a critical component of the program. In order to learn leadership, the youth must actually serve in leadership roles. Adult leaders may be either men or women in all positions.

A Scouts BSA troop is run by the Senior Patrol Leader, who is elected by the troop, and their assistant, who may either be elected or appointed. These and the other youth leaders are advised and supported by the adult leaders. "Scouts are youth-led."

=== Finance ===
The National Council is incorporated as a 501(c)(3) non-profit organization and is funded from private donations, membership dues, corporate sponsors, and special events with total revenues of $237 million.

In addition to donations from individuals, Scouting America receives extensive donations from major corporations. In 2010, their top corporate donors were, in order, Intel, Emerson, Verizon, 3M, Bank of America, Wells Fargo, Pfizer, Valero, UPS, U.S. Bank, Eli Lilly, GE, and Monsanto.

== Impact on American life ==
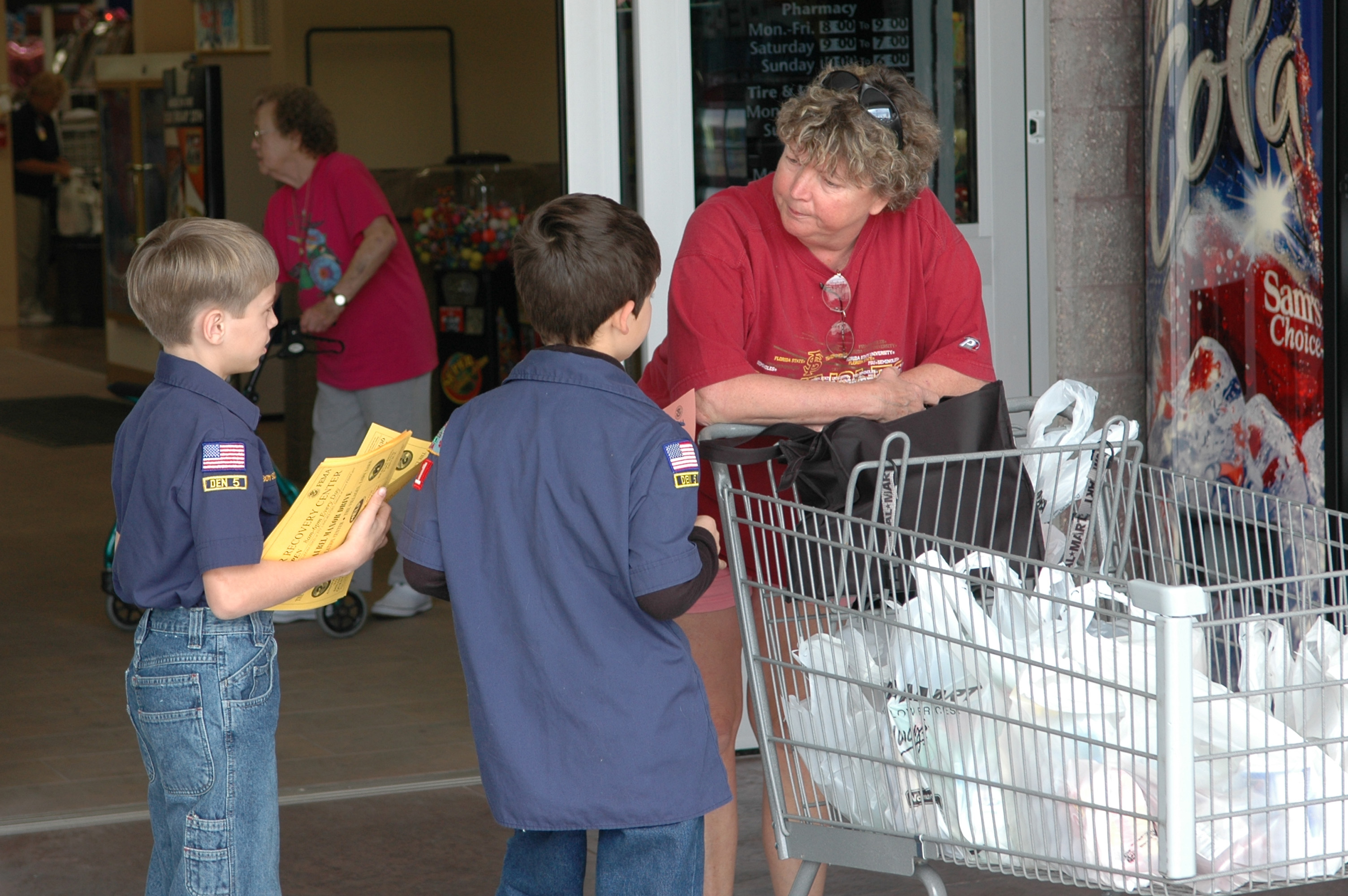
FEMA Boy Scouts of America video

Scouting and Scouts are well known throughout American culture and approximately 130 million Americans have participated in Scouting America programs at some time in their lives. The term "Boy Scout" is used to generally describe someone who is earnest and honest, or who helps others cheerfully; it can also be used as a pejorative term for someone deemed to be overly idealistic.

Prominent Americans in diverse walks of life, from filmmaker Steven Spielberg (who helped launch a merit badge in cinematography) to adventurer Steve Fossett to U.S. presidents, were Scouting America members as youths. Over two-thirds of all astronauts have had some type of involvement in Scouting, and eleven of the twelve men to walk on the Moon were Scouts, including Eagle Scouts Neil Armstrong and Charlie Duke. The pinewood derby—a wood car racing event for Cub Scouts—has been declared "a celebrated rite of spring" and was named part of "America's 100 Best" by Reader's Digest.

Gerald Ford, the only U.S. president to have attained the rank of Eagle Scout, said, "I can say without hesitation, because of Scouting principles, I know I was a better athlete, I was a better naval officer, I was a better congressman, and I was a better prepared president."

Norman Rockwell's Beyond the Easel, 1969

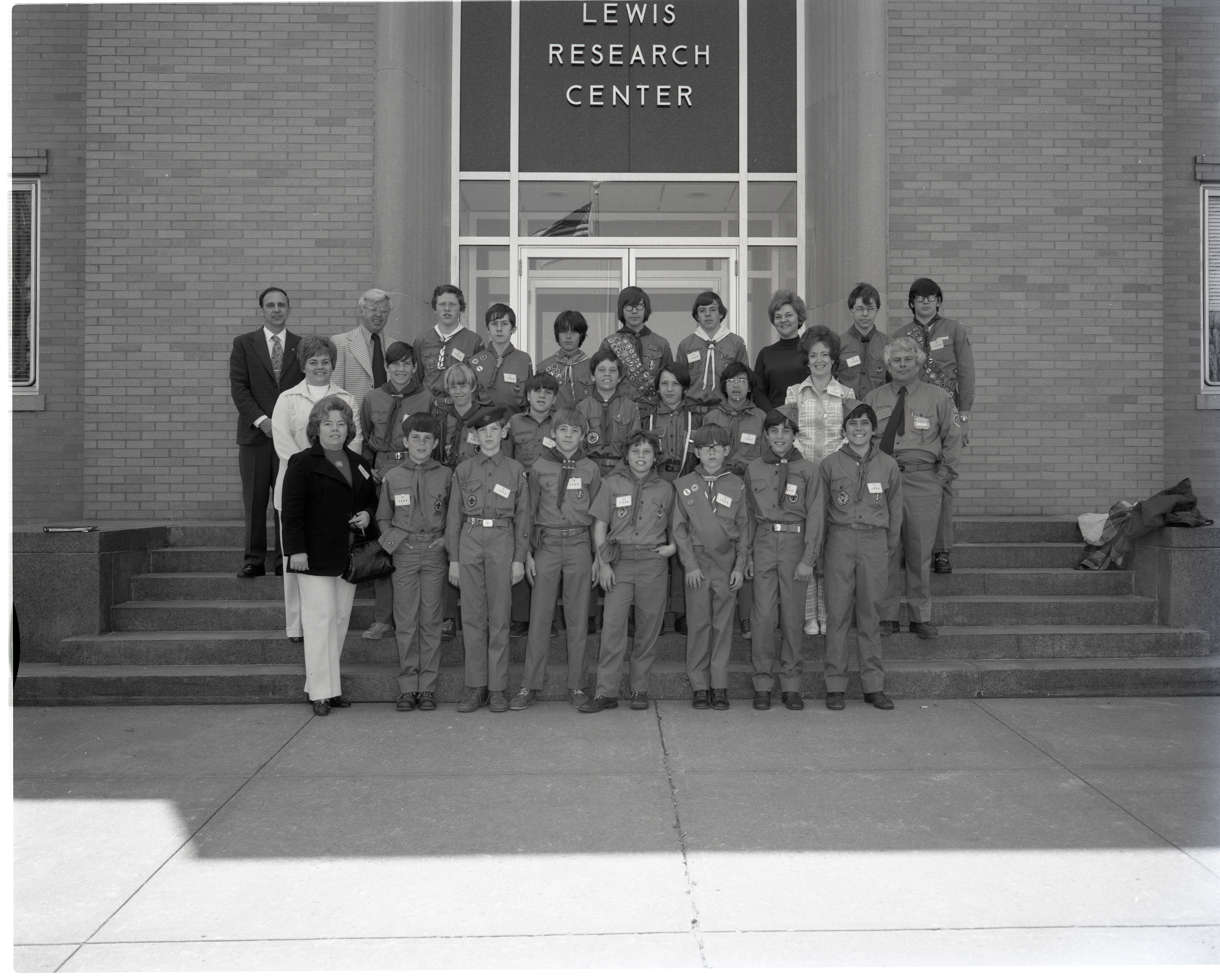
Boy Scout Troop 68 (1974)

Famed American illustrator Norman Rockwell's works were closely associated with the Boy Scouts of America for much of the 20th century. Beginning in 1913, Rockwell began illustrating covers of Scout Life, the magazine for Scouting America youth. He also drew the organization's annual calendar illustrations between 1925 and 1976.

In 1969, as a tribute to Rockwell's 75th birthday, officials of Brown & Bigelow and Scouting America asked Rockwell to pose in Beyond the Easel for a calendar illustration. As part of the US Bicentennial celebrations in 1976, Rockwell's Scouting paintings toured the nation and were viewed by 280,000 people. In 2008, a twelve-city US tour of Rockwell's works was scheduled.

Alvin Townley wrote in Legacy of Honor about the large positive impact of Eagle Scouts in America. Townley cited such examples as how Scouts, especially Eagle Scouts, were disproportionately represented among Hurricane Katrina's volunteer relief workers; just as they are disproportionately represented among members of the United States Senate. Former Governor Rick Perry of Texas is an Eagle Scout who defended the organization's policies and restrictions against ACLU criticisms in his book, On My Honor: Why the American Values of the Boy Scouts Are Worth Fighting For.

Boy Scouts of the Eagle Patrol Eagle Scouts

Mark Mays, CEO of Clear Channel Communications, told a magazine interviewer in May 2008 that, "Particularly in the very impactful ages of youth 11 to 14 years old, when they can really go astray and you're taking the time to spend with them and focus on cultural core values like reverent, trustworthy, loyal, and helpful—all of those different things ... Scouting has a huge positive impact on boys and their lives, and that in turn positively impacts our communities and society as a whole."

Mayor of New York City and business tycoon Michael Bloomberg, said that Scouting America's Scout Law required of all Scouts—a Scout is trustworthy, loyal, helpful, friendly, courteous, kind, obedient, cheerful, thrifty, brave, clean, and reverent—are "all the American values ... Americans have quaintly simplistic ways and direct ways of phrasing things ... I think it's one of the great strengths of this country."

Peter Applebome, an editor of The New York Times, wrote in 2003 of his experience as an adult participating with his son in Scouting activities, "I feel lucky to have had this unexpected vehicle to share my son's youth, to shape it, and to be shaped by it as well." He concluded that, although Scouting is viewed by some as old-fashioned, "Scouting's core values ... are wonderful building blocks for a movement and a life. Scouting's genuinely egalitarian goals and instincts are more important now than they've ever been. It's one of the only things that kids do that's genuinely cooperative, not competitive."

At the turn of the 20th century, Halloween had frequently become a night of vandalism, with widespread destruction of property and cruelty towards animals and people. Around 1912, the BSA, Boys Clubs and other neighborhood organizations came together to encourage safer celebration as an alternative to more destructive practices.

Scouting America is quite particular about how and when the Scout uniforms and insignia may be used in film and other portrayals; and for that reason, most films and television productions made in the US utilize "ersatz" Scouting organizations. Examples of this include the "Order of the Straight Arrow", portrayed in the King of the Hill cartoon series, and the "Indian Guides" depicted in the 1995 Chevy Chase film, Man of the House. Exceptions include Disney's Follow Me, Boys! (1966; re-released 1976) and the closing shot of The Sopranos, which shows Cub Scouts in full uniform.

=== Good Turns ===
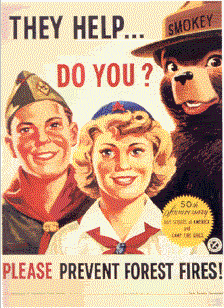
Smokey Bear with members of Scouting America and the Camp Fire Girls celebrating the 50th anniversary of their founding in 1960

From the inception of the Scouting movement, Scouts have been urged to "Do a Good Turn Daily", the slogan for Scouting America. The first national Good Turn was the promotion of a safe and sane Fourth of July in 1912. During World War I, Every Scout to Save a Soldier was a slogan used to motivate children involved in Boy Scouts and Girl Scouts to help sell War savings stamps. Scouting for Food is an ongoing annual program begun in 1986 that collects food for local food banks.

In 1997, the BSA developed Service to America with a commitment to provide 200 million hours of service by youth members by the end of the year 2000. As part of Service to America, the BSA provided service projects in conjunction with the National Park Service. In October 2003, the Department of the Interior expanded the program with the creation of Take Pride in America, opening service to all Americans. Service to America became Good Turn for America in 2004 and expanded to address the problems of hunger, homelessness, and inadequate housing and poor health in conjunction with the Salvation Army, the American Red Cross, Habitat for Humanity, and other organizations.

== Incidents and concerns ==
On February 1, 2019, the Boy Scouts of America renamed its flagship program, Boy Scouts, to Scouts BSA to reflect its policy change, allowing girls to join separate, all-girl troops.

On February 18, 2020, the National BSA filed for Chapter 11 bankruptcy protection. On November 16, 2020, the National BSA disclosed in their bankruptcy filings that more than 92,000 former Scouts had reported sexual abuse by members of the organization. In December 2021, the insurer for the Boy Scouts of America agreed to pay $800 million into the fund for survivors. In 2022, the Boy Scouts of America agreed to pay an additional $2.4 billion into the fund as part of a bankruptcy settlement with payments beginning in September 2023.

=== Sexual abuse cases ===
Scouting sexual abuse cases are situations where youth involved in Scouting programs have been sexually abused by someone who is also involved in the Scouting program. J.L. Tarr, a US Chief Scout Executive in the 1980s, was quoted in an article regarding sexual assault cases against Scout leaders across all 50 states: "That's been an issue since the Boy Scouts began." Several reports have surfaced over the years regarding incidents of sexual abuse within the Boy Scouts of America, including incidents of repeat offenders. There have also been several high-profile court cases that resulted in convictions and settlements involving such incidents. On October 19, 2012, the Boy Scouts of America were forced by court order to release more than 20,000 pages of documentation about 1,200 alleged child sexual abuse cases within the organization from between 1965 and 1985. Legal claims against Scouting America for such matters continue to the present day. After its bankruptcy in February 2020, more than 92,000 sexual abuse claims were filed with the bankruptcy court before the November 16, 2020, deadline to receive claims.

In the 1980s, Scouting America developed its Youth Protection program to educate youth, leaders, and parents about the problem and to introduce barriers to sexual abuse of children using the Scout program to reach victims. "Two deep" leadership dictates that no adult member can be alone with any youth member (other than their child). Shortly after joining, youth must discuss with their parents a pamphlet on sexual abuse. Before joining, adults must take a youth protection training course, which must be renewed every two years. Since 2003, new adult members must pass a criminal background check (adults who were already members had to pass a background check by 2008). The Youth Protection Plan from the organization is linked to in a CDC report on such programs.

=== Financial problems ===
In recent decades, membership in Scouting America and income have declined.

In addition, the organization spent millions of dollars to contest and settle lawsuits arising from sexual misconduct by BSA volunteers and employees dating back to the 1960s. From 2015 to 2017, it paid nearly $12 million to the law firm Ogletree Deakins for litigation counsel. In its 2018 annual report, BSA officials said that the organization's future financial situation would depend on the outcome of various litigation and its costs. The annual report said that the BSA may have "to pay damages out of its own funds to the extent the claims are not covered by insurance or if the insurance carriers are unable or unwilling to honor the claims".

Accordingly, the BSA hired a law firm in December 2018 to investigate filing for Chapter 11 bankruptcy. Such a bankruptcy could stop litigation of at least 140 lawsuits and prevent further lawsuits. In October 2019, the BSA raised membership rates to cover its increased operational expenses, particularly insurance costs.

On February 18, 2020, the organization filed for bankruptcy in the bankruptcy court of the U.S. District Court for the District of Delaware, listing liabilities of between $100 million and $500 million and assets of $1 billion to $10 billion. The bankruptcy filing came as the organization faced hundreds of sexual abuse lawsuits. As a result of the filing, all civil litigation against the organization was suspended. Local Councils and units remained largely unaffected as they are standalone units. BSA contends that it alone should be financially responsible for any settlements in the sex abuse case lawsuits. Plaintiffs have complained that BSA is hiding its assets through its affiliates. Critics of the filing derisively described the organization and its move as "bankrupt, but not because it's broke".

=== Anti-bullying movement ===
After reports surfaced in the 1970s and 1980s about bullying in the Boy Scouts, Boy Scouts of America tried to develop a no-tolerance bullying policy. In the 1990s, organization leaders acknowledged it had a problem with bullying, due in part to a pre-1970s "boys will be boys" attitude by adult leaders who believed that older boys who "picked on" younger or weaker Scouts "toughened someone up" and that boys who reported bullying were "snitches" and "tattletales".

In July 1987, a Boy Scout at the Goshen Scout Reservation was severely beaten in his sleep by several other Scouts. The Goshen staff responded by changing the layout of its campsites to prevent having sites in isolated areas, assigning camp staff members to each visiting troop as "advisors", and to watch for fights or other trouble resulting from conflicts at the various campsites.

In the 21st century, the Boy Scouts have adopted a "Bullying Awareness Program" which trains adults to recognize the signs of bullying, especially in isolated environments such as extended campouts in the wilderness or at summer camp. Parents are also advised on what to do and whom to contact should a Scout state other Scouts are bullying them. Dealing with the bullies themselves is also addressed, in particular, those bullies who "game the system", pretending to be compassionate and apologetic for bullying victims when adults confront them, only to return to such behaviors when the adults are no longer present.

=== LDS departure ===
In 2018, the Church of Jesus Christ of Latter-day Saints—the largest charter organization supporting BSA—cut ties with the BSA, substantially contributing to a net loss of nearly a million scouts and leaders. The decision was made partly in response to BSA membership policy changes, such as allowing girls, openly gay, and transgender people to participate in the organization. However, a joint statement released by the First Presidency of the LDS Church on May 8, 2018, reflects the LDS Church's official stance on the departure and states, in the last paragraph "While the Church will no longer be a chartered partner of BSA or sponsor Scouting units after December 31, 2019, it continues to support the goals and values reflected in the Scout Oath and Scout Law and expresses its profound desire for Scouting's continuing and growing success in the years ahead."

== Commemorations ==
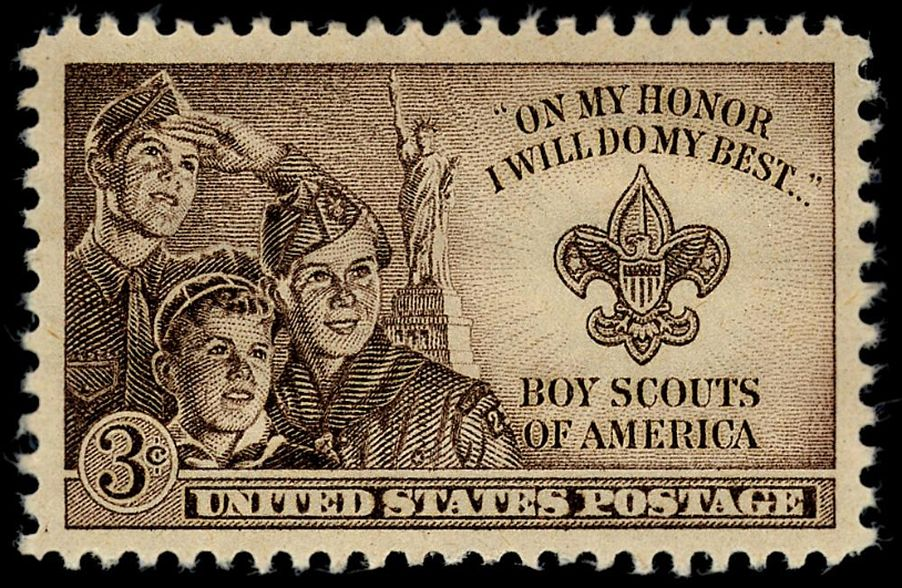
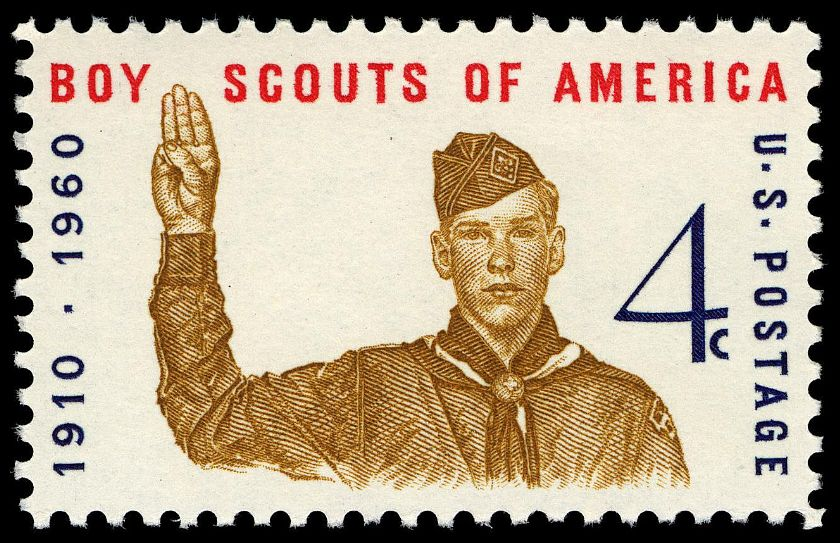
In 1950 the US Post Office issued its first Boy Scout stamp, (left) commemorating the 40th Anniversary.
In 1960 it issued another stamp, commemorating the Boy Scout's 50th Anniversary.
Since then several other Boy Scout stamps have been issued.

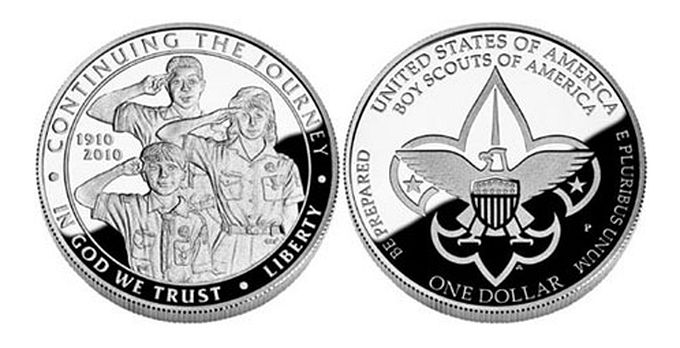
Boy Scouts of America 100th Anniversary commemorative Silver Dollar issued March 23, 2010 by the United States Mint

=== 115th anniversary ===
During the weekend of February 8, 2025, the organization's 115th anniversary, sites across the U.S. were illuminated in red, white and blue, including Niagara Falls, the Empire State Building, and the Pennsylvania State Capitol.
