= Leadership in Scouting America =

Leadership roles in Scouting America

Scouters
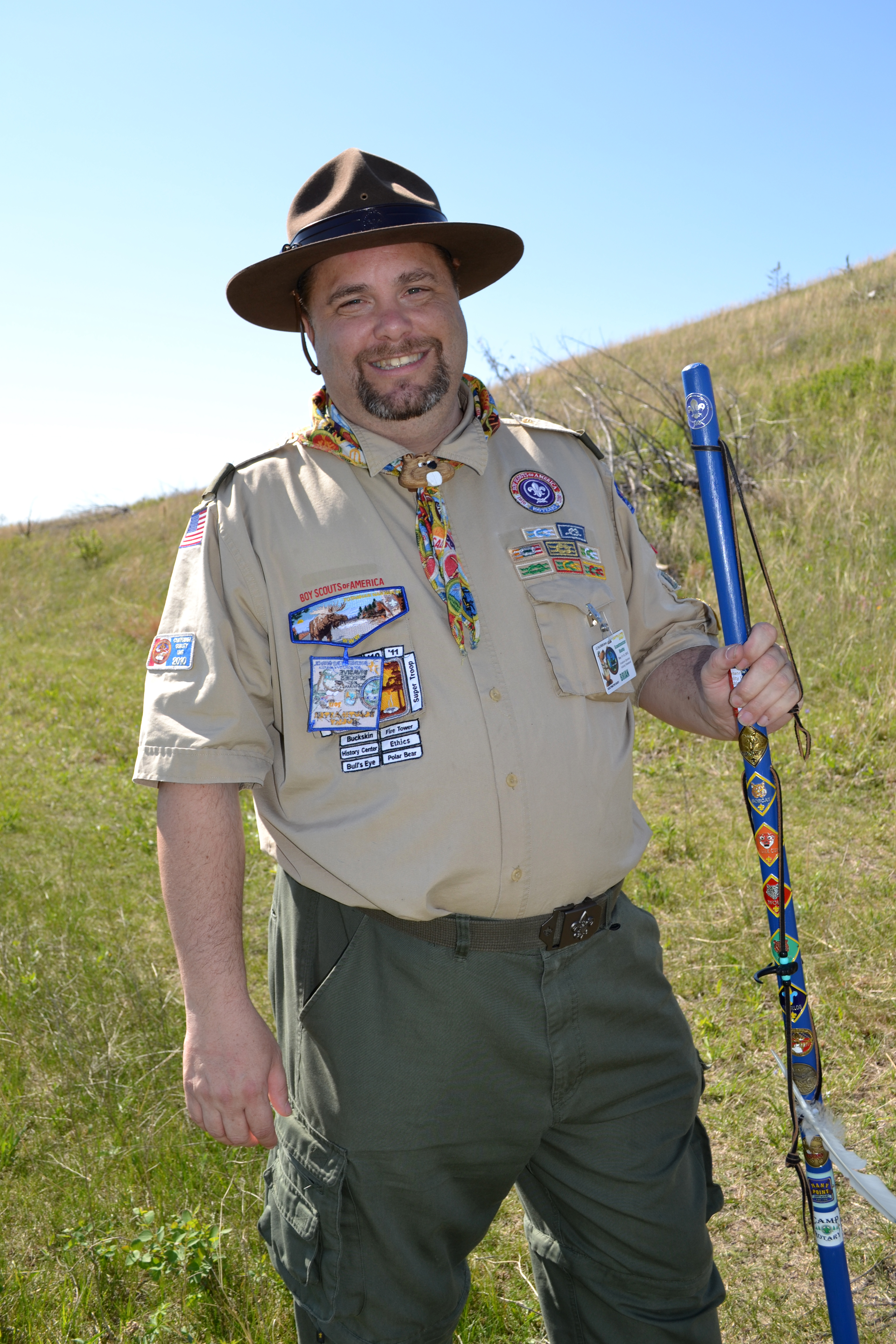
- Scouting volunteer
- Founded: 1910

In Scouting America (formerly the Boy Scouts of America), a Scout leader refers to the trained leaders (men or women) of a Scout unit. Adult leaders are generally referred to as "Scouters," and the youth leaders are referred to by their position within a unit (e.g. Den Chief, Patrol Leader, Boatswain). In all Scouting units above the Cub Scout pack and units serving adolescent Scouts, leadership of the unit comprises both adult leaders (Scouters) and youth leaders (Scouts). This is a key part of the Aims and Methods of Scouting. In order to learn leadership, the youth must actually serve in leadership roles.

== Adult leaders ==
Scouting America has always relied on volunteers to make the organization run. Among the volunteers who provide troop level adult leadership and support, there are Scoutmasters and their uniformed adult leadership (including assistant Scoutmasters and unit chaplain), and committee members. All positions require adults to join the troop by registration. The registration process for adult leaders includes a personal reference and criminal background check, nomination by the committee chairman, followed by appointment by the chartering organization and concluding with acceptance by the district executive (a professional Scouter who is an employee of the local Scout council). A Scouter may be a registered member of more than one unit.

Scoutmasters are responsible for developing and delivering the "program" or the training of youth leadership in how to plan and run a Scout troop's activities. The members of the committee are responsible for "service" or provisioning the troop with the necessary goods and services that allow the Scoutmasters to focus solely on the program.

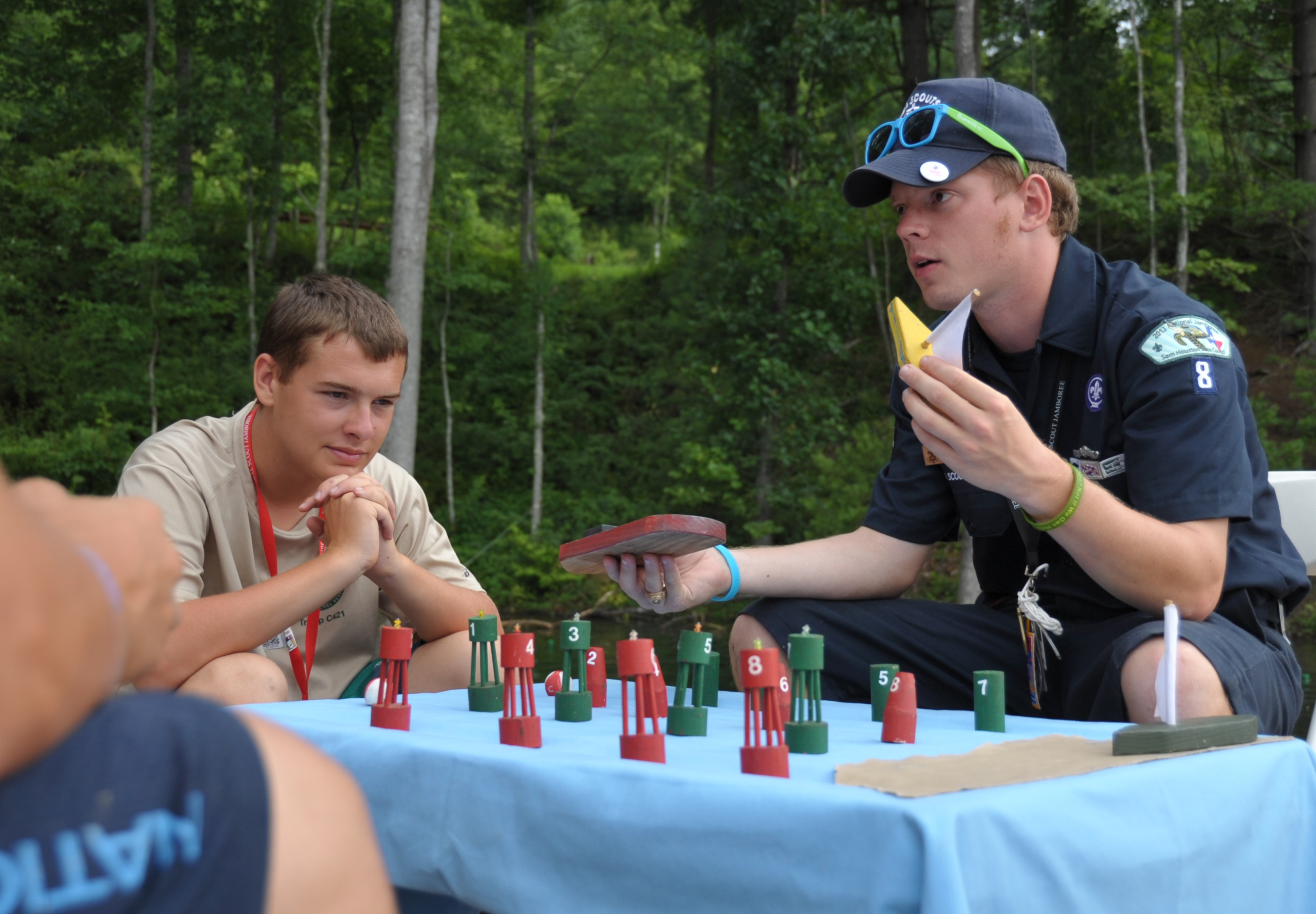
Sea Scout leader

Committee members may interact with Scouts. For example, they may be assisted by youth leaders (see quartermaster) or they may provide technical training to the Scouts as merit badge counselors. Committee members most important direct interaction with Scouts occurs during boards of review. Committee members assemble in groups of 3 to 6 in order to constitute boards of review. After a Scoutmaster has conducted a Scoutmaster conference with the Scout and determined he is ready for advancement, a Scout must meet with a board of review.

There are similar service and program splits for adult leadership in Cub Scouts, Venturing and Sea Scouts. While there is only limited opportunity for youth leadership in Cub Scouting (i.e. den chief), youth leadership takes an even stronger role in providing both service and program in Venturing.

The leader of a Cub Scout pack is referred to as Cubmaster and who may be assisted by assistant Cubmasters. The Cubmaster is also assisted by any number of den leaders.

Venturing crews have an Advisor, and Sea Scouting ships have a Skipper. All of these terms are used for the men or women who fill the role as the adults responsible for maintaining the program by advising the unit's youth leaders on how to plan and lead the unit's activities.

=== Key 3 ===
The Key 3 of the typical unit consists of the Unit leader, the Committee Chair, and the Chartered Organization Representative. The Unit Leader is the Cubmaster (for Cub Scouts), the Scoutmaster (for Scouts BSA), the Advisor (for Venturing), or the Skipper (for Sea Scouts). The Committee Chair runs the unit's committee, consisting of adults 21 years of age or older who support the unit program from behind the scenes. The Chartered Organization Representative is from the unit's chartering organization, and they approve all other adult leaders in the unit.

At the district level, the Key 3 consists of the District Chair, the District Commissioner, and the District Executive. For a council, it is the Council President, the Council Commissioner, and the Scout Executive. At the national level, the Key 3 consists of the Chief Scout Executive (currently Roger Krone), the National Commissioner (currently Devang Desai), and the National Chair (currently Brad Tilden).

=== Adult leader training ===
Robert Baden-Powell, 1st Baron Baden-Powell recognized the importance of trained leaders, which is why he instituted the Wood Badge training program.

There is a training continuum for both Scoutmasters and committee members. The training continuum for both positions includes "Youth Protection", "Fast Start" and "New Leader's Essentials." More advanced trainings address specific program needs, like Powder Horn, and many are offered at the Philmont Training Center.

== Youth leaders ==
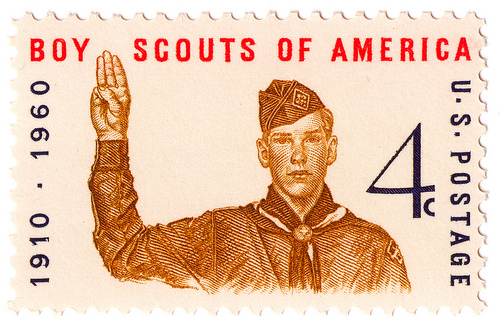
Boy Scouts of America, 50th Jubilee stamp

A properly run Scout troop is run by a Senior Patrol Leader, who is elected by the troop, and their assistant, who may either be elected or appointed. These and the other youth leaders are advised and supported by the adult leaders. In a Scout troop, youth leaders include: Senior Patrol Leader, Assistant Senior Patrol Leader, Patrol Leaders, Assistant Patrol Leaders, scribe, quartermaster, Outdoor Ethics Guide, librarian, chaplain aide, bugler, historian, den chief, Troop Guide, Order of the Arrow representative, Junior Assistant Scoutmaster, and instructor. The Scoutmaster, Assistant Scoutmaster, and Adult Leaders' main roles are to give advice to the SPL, supervise the scouts, and deal with paperwork. "Scouts are youth-led."

=== Youth leader training ===
Trained youth leadership is important to the heart of all of Scouting. In Scouts BSA the beginning training is the unit-level course, Introduction to Leadership Skills for Troops. There are also council level trainings like the White Stag Leadership Development Program, or the National Youth Leadership Training.

== Commissioner Service ==
laurel wreath

Commissioners are a group within Scouting America that provides direct service to each Scouting unit (pack, troop, team, crew or ship). Commissioners are experienced Scouters who help chartered organizations and unit leaders to achieve the aims of Scouting by using the methods of Scouting. They help to ensure that each unit has strong leadership and they encourage training, promote the use of the unit committee and encourage a relationship with the chartering organization.

The Commissioner position is the oldest in Scouting and is the origin of the professional Scouting positions, as volunteers they each receive a commission, which is why their badges feature a "wreath of service."

=== History ===
Commissioner service started with the first three national Scout commissioners: Daniel Carter Beard, Peter Bomus and William Verbeck. Beard headed the Sons of Daniel Boone, Bomus the Boy Scouts of the United States, and Verbeck the National Scouts of America. Bomus and Verbeck left after two years, and Beard served more than thirty.

Local commissioners formed the first councils and started the tradition of direct support to the Scoutmaster. A first-class council had a paid commissioner (now known as a 'Scout executive or council executive'), and could keep 15 cents of each 25 cent registration, while second-class councils with volunteer commissioners could keep five cents.

Theodore Roosevelt is one of the most notable commissioners having served as the council commissioner of the Nassau County Council.

=== National level ===
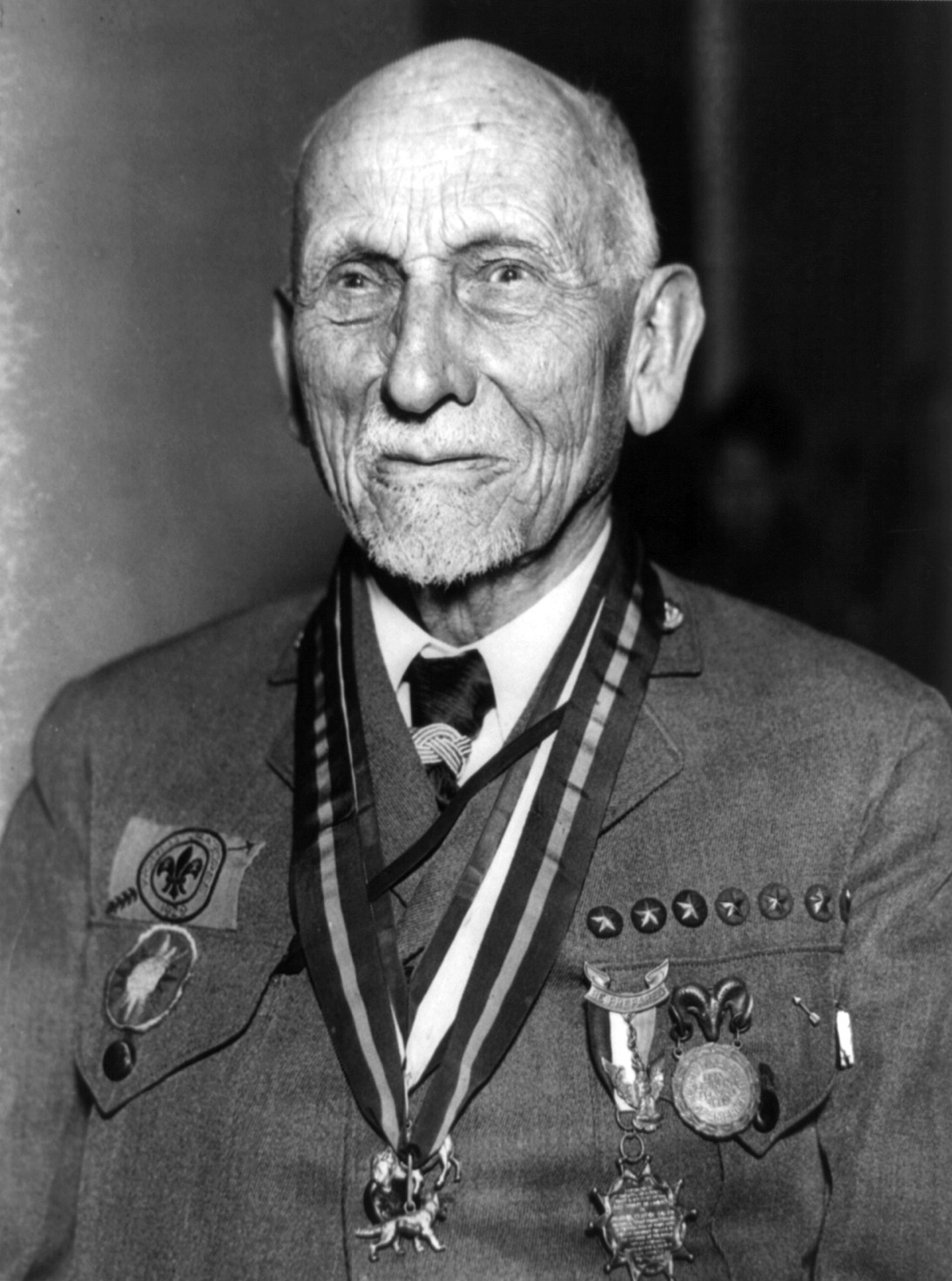
Daniel Carter Beard

The National Commissioner is a member of the executive board of the National Council. The position was re-established in 1990, and is a four-year term of service. The current National Commissioner is Devang Desai of Florida.

The position of International Commissioner represents Scouting America within the World Organization of the Scout Movement.

==== List of National Commissioners ====
National Commissioners of Scouting America
Number	Service	Name	Eagle Scout	Silver Buffalo	Awards 3	Awards 4
1	1910–1941	Daniel Carter Beard	1915	1926	Silver Wolf 1924	Gold 1922
2	1910-1912	Peter S. Bomus				
3	1910-1912	William Verbeck				
4	1943-1960	George J. Fisher		1926		
	1960-1985	25 year long hiatus	----	----	----	----
5	1985-1995	Earl G. Graves		1988		
6	1995-1999	Francis H. Olmstead, Jr.		1997		
7	1999-2004	William F. "Rick" Cronk		2001	Bronze Wolf 2008	
8	2004-2008	Donald D. Belcher	1953	2005		DESA 2000
9	2008-2016	Tico Perez	1977	2007	OA DSA 2004	DESA 2007
10	2016-18	Charles Dahlquist		2007		
11	2018-20	Ellie Morrison		2013		
12	2020-25	W. Scott Sorrels	Year Unknown	2011	Bronze Wolf 2020	DESA 2018
13	2025-	Devang Desai	1989	2022	OA DSA 1998	

=== Region level ===
The position of regional commissioner and area commissioner were created in 2007 and announced at the October 2007 National Executive Board meeting. These two positions were created "to support councils in the areas of membership, unit charter renewal, and training in support of commissioner service.".

=== Council level ===
The council commissioner is selected by the council. Assistant council commissioners are appointed by the council commissioner with approval from the council.

=== District level ===
The district commissioner and assistant district commissioners are responsible for recruiting, training, guiding, and evaluating the commissioner staff. The district commissioner is part of what is called the key-three, the other two members being the district chairman and the district executive.

Roundtable commissioners

Roundtable commissioners use the roundtable meetings to provide unit leaders with resources and training in program skills. The roundtable is a forum for all of the unit leaders and provides opportunities for discourse and training.

Unit commissioners

Unit commissioners serve and counsel one or more units (i.e. packs, troops, teams, crews or ships). They act as a direct representative between the unit and the district. Unit commissioners are adult Scouters that have significant tenure within the Scouting program, and are dedicated to seeing individual units succeed. They also promote the monthly district roundtable within their assigned units and make sure that the unit leadership is current on training courses required by the National Council. Unit commissioners also keep in contact with the respective unit committees and the unit's chartered organization.

=== Training and recognition ===
Distinguished Commissioner Service Award

Commissioners are expected to complete Basic Leader Training so that they have the essential information they need to provide a safe and successful quality program. Advanced and supplemental training is generally performed at a commissioners college provided at the local council level.

- Basic Leader Training for Boy Scout roundtable commissioner is Boy Scout Roundtable Commissioner Training.
- Basic Leader Training for Cub Scout roundtable commissioner is Cub Scout Roundtable Commissioner and Staff Basic Training.
- Basic Leader Training for district commissioners, assistant district commissioners, and for unit commissioners is Unit Commissioner Orientation.

After completing performance goals, the Arrowhead Honor may be awarded. Commissioners may then earn the Commissioner's Key by completing basic training and serving for at least three years. After five years of service the commissioner may be recognized with the Distinguished Commissioner Service Award.

=== Wreath of Service ===
laurel wreath

The "wreath of service" is located on all commissioner position emblems (and the professional Scouting positions). The laurel wreath is a traditional Roman symbol of victory, triumph, accomplishment, and civic service. The BSA uses the laurel as a symbol for the service rendered to units and the continued partnership between volunteers and professionals. The wreath of service represents commitment to program and unit service.

The Commissioner position is the oldest in Scouting and is the origin of the professional Scouting positions, which is why badges of the professional Scouters have that feature as well. The wreath of service is a feature on all commissioner and professional position patches. Primary commissioner (Council Commissioner, District Commissioner, Unit Commissioner) insignia bears a silver laurel wreath in accordance with the long-standing BSA award standard (based on the U.S. military concept) of silver being higher than gold. Accordingly, assistant commissioner (Assistant Council Commissioner, Assistant District Commissioner, Roundtable Commissioner) insignia bears a gold laurel wreath.

== See also ==
- Youth Protection program
- The Scoutmaster
- Leadership training (Boy Scouts of America)
