= John Donnell =

John Donnell may refer to:

- John Randolph Donnell, oilman, banker and philanthropist, involved in Scouting
- John R. Donnell Jr., his son, involved in Scouting

== See also ==
- John O'Donnell (disambiguation)
