= Joseph Brunton =

American scout executive

Joseph A. Brunton Jr.
- Born: June 26, 1902
- Died: July 8, 1988 (aged 86); Gibsonia, Pennsylvania
- Employer: Boy Scouts of America
- Title: Chief Scout Executive
- Term: 1960–1967
- Predecessor: Arthur A. Schuck
- Successor: Alden G. Barber
- Spouse: Marienne

Joseph A. Brunton Jr. (June 26, 1902 – July 8, 1988) was a career professional for the Boy Scouts of America, and served the BSA National Council as the fourth Chief Scout Executive from 1960 to 1966.

== BSA career ==
Joseph Brunton became a professional Scouter at an early age, and served in several local council positions, including that of council Scout executive. He became a member of the BSA National Council in 1952, and succeeded Ray O. Wyland as Director of Church Relations until 1957, when he was promoted to senior management.

He was appointed by the BSA National Executive Board to become the next Chief Scout Executive in 1960. During his tenure, youth membership continued to expand in both Cub Scouting and Boy Scouting. Various changes were made to the Exploring program, including a stronger emphasis on career exploration and post-specialty programs, in order to retain teenage youth members and attract additional teens to the program.

== Order of the Arrow ==
Brunton was a Scout executive of the Chester County Council and one of the charter members of its Order of the Arrow Octoraro Lodge #22. He volunteered considerably for the order during his professional career, served as a national OA officer, and was elected national chief when adults still served in those positions. He was instrumental in creating the OA Distinguished Service Award first given at the 1940 National Lodge meeting, and he himself later received the award in 1946.

== Honors ==
Brunton was awarded the Bronze Wolf, the only distinction of the World Organization of the Scout Movement, awarded by the World Scout Committee for exceptional services to world Scouting, in 1965.

The Freedoms Foundation of Valley Forge presented Brunton with its American Patriots Medal, in 1959, the first given out.

Alpha Phi Omega National Service Fraternity, recognized Joseph Brunton as their Fall 1960 Pledge Class Namesake and presented him with its National Distinguished Service Award in 1966.

Brunton was presented the Distinguished Eagle Scout Award in 1969 and the Silver Buffalo Award in 1973 by the Boy Scouts of America.

Boy Scouts of America
Preceded by Arthur A. Schuck	Chief Scout Executive; 1960-1966	Succeeded by Alden G. Barber
