= William D. Campbell (Scouting) =

American scoutleader

- Undated photo of Campbell
- Born: William Durant Campbell; March 18, 1907; Flint, Michigan, USA
- Died: October 20, 1995 (aged 88); Manhattan, New York, USA
- Education: Princeton University
- Spouse: Beatrice Hawn (m. 1940; died 1987)
- Children: Margot Bogert
- Relatives: William C. Durant (grandfather)
- Military career
- Allegiance: United States
- Branch: Army
- Rank: Major
- Conflicts: World War II

William Durant Campbell (March 18, 1907 – October 20, 1995) was a highly-decorated leader of the Scouting movement in the 1960s, 1970s, and 1980s.

Campbell was born in Flint, Michigan, a grandson of William C. Durant, the founder of General Motors. He graduated from Princeton University in 1929, and first went into banking. After a few years, he became a field associate of the American Museum of Natural History and led six of their African expeditions in the 1930s. In 1937, he built Monte Carlo Ranch House in Kenya. During World War II, Campbell served in the U.S. Army as a battery commander. He retired as a major.

== Background ==
In 1940 he married Beatrice Hawn, who died in 1987. They had one daughter, Margot Bogert, who was also a world Scouting leader and Chairman of the Board of Trustees of Sarah Lawrence College.

Campbell was an officer of the World Organization of the Scout Movement from 1961 to 1965 and then from 1973 to 1985, and received Scouting awards from seven countries. He helped establish the World Scout Foundation and served as its chairman from 1969 to 1977. Campbell was awarded the Bronze Wolf, the only distinction of the World Organization of the Scout Movement, awarded by the World Scout Committee for exceptional services to world Scouting, in 1959. Campbell was also an Eagle Scout and recipient of both the Distinguished Eagle Scout Award and Silver Buffalo Award.

He is the only man in the history of the BSA to hold all five top-tier Scouting awards: the Bronze Wolf, the Silver Buffalo, the Silver Antelope, the OA Distinguished Service Award, and the Distinguished Eagle Scout Award. In 1971 he also received the highest distinction of the Scout Association of Japan, the Golden Pheasant Award.

He lived on Beekman Place in Manhattan, New York.
