= Hector Perez =

American attorney

Hector A. "Tico" Perez
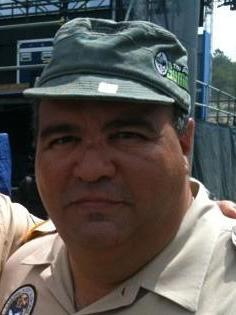
- Perez in 2010
- Education: · University of Central Florida · Georgetown University Law Center
- Occupations: Administrator, attorney at law
- Known for: Scouting
- Board member of: · Florida Board of Governors · National Council of the Boy Scouts of America
- Spouse: Donna Perez (former)
- Awards: Distinguished Eagle Scout Award

Hector A. "Tico" Perez is an American attorney at law and an administrator. He was the 9th National Commissioner of the Boy Scouts of America, serving from 2008 to 2016.

== Early life and education ==
Perez is the son of Cuban immigrants to the U.S. His family moved from Tallahassee, Florida, to Sanford, Florida, when he was a toddler.

He graduated from the University of Central Florida (UCF), later graduating from the Georgetown University Law Center, located in Washington, D.C. He is a member of the Sigma Chi fraternity.

During his years at UCF, Perez volunteered with the local Oviedo Fire Department. He was also student-body president during his senior year.

== Career ==
Perez was a partner of the law firm Baker Hostetler, a law firm headquartered in Cleveland, Ohio. He is currently a principal with Edge Public Affairs.

He is a political analyst for local NBC affiliate, WESH, a commentator on the nationally syndicated Daily Buzz and hosts his own political talk radio show, Talkin' with Tico, on WDBO. Additionally, Perez has a regular weekly television program in Spanish, entitled TeleNoticiasExtra, on WTMO-CD the local Telemundo affiliate in Central Florida.

== Political activities ==
Perez is active in the Republican Party. In 2000, he ran for Congress in Florida's 8th congressional district. He also serves as a representative for the GOP.

== Civic Involvement ==
=== Boy Scouts of America ===
As the National Commissioner of the BSA, he was also a member of the executive board of its National Council.

Perez was formerly the president of the BSA's Central Florida Council and of the BSA's Southern Region.

He is an Eagle Scout, the highest rank attainable in the BSA's Boy Scouting program, and has received Scouting awards including the Silver Beaver Award, the Silver Antelope Award, the Silver Buffalo Award, the Distinguished Eagle Scout Award, the Distinguished Service Award of the Order of the Arrow and the Whitney M. Young Jr. Service Award.

=== Other organizations ===
Perez is also a member of the Florida Board of Governors, the governing body for the State University System of Florida; president of the Orlando Utilities Commission; and vice-chairman of the Orlando Arts Council.

Perez is the Past President of the Orlando Utilities Commission, Past President of the Greater Orlando Chamber of Commerce, Past President of United Arts of Central Florida, Past Chairman of the Orange County Arts and Cultural Affairs Commission, Past President of the University of Central Florida Alumni Association.

== Awards ==
Perez has been awarded with the Silver Beaver, Silver Antelope, Silver Buffalo and Distinguished Eagle Scout Award by the Boy Scouts of America. The Order of the Arrow has awarded him the Distinguished Service Award and the Sigma Chi fraternity has recognized him as a "Significant Sig." He was recognized by the University of Central Florida as the Distinguished Alumnus in 1998, and he has received numerous leadership and community service awards.
