= Horseshoe Scout Reservation =

Scouting America camp in Maryland and Pennsylvania

- Owner: Chester County Council
- Location: Rising Sun, Maryland
- Coordinates: 39.71°N 76.11°W
- Founded: 1927
- Founders: Joseph A. Brunton Jr.; Pierre S. du Pont; Charles M. Heistand; Louis Lester; Gilbert McIlvaine; J. Gibson McIlvaine
- Website www.cccscouting.org/camping

The Horseshoe Scout Reservation is a Scouting America camp owned by Chester County Council. It is located on the Mason–Dixon line separating Pennsylvania and Maryland. The name of the camp derives from the Octoraro Creek, a tributary of the Susquehanna River, that makes a meandering four-mile horseshoe through the property.

The Horseshoe Scout Reservation is divided into two camps: Camp Horseshoe (in Rising Sun, Maryland), a Scouts BSA-only camp, and Camp John H. Ware, III (in Peach Bottom, Pennsylvania.), which serves cub scout programs

The reservation is a "multi-use" facility and hosts Scouts BSA, Cub Scout, Venturing and other programs. Camp Ware is also home to various council training courses such as National Youth Leadership Training (NYLT), Wood Badge and Powder Horn.

== History ==
A 1988 State Museum of Pennsylvania archeological dig at the reservation's Buzzard's Rock uncovered pieces of pottery and arrowheads. This confirmed the long-held theory that the rock had been used as a shelter for the Susquehannock tribe of Native Americans. The artifacts indicated that the rock had been used as a temporary shelter and lookout post.

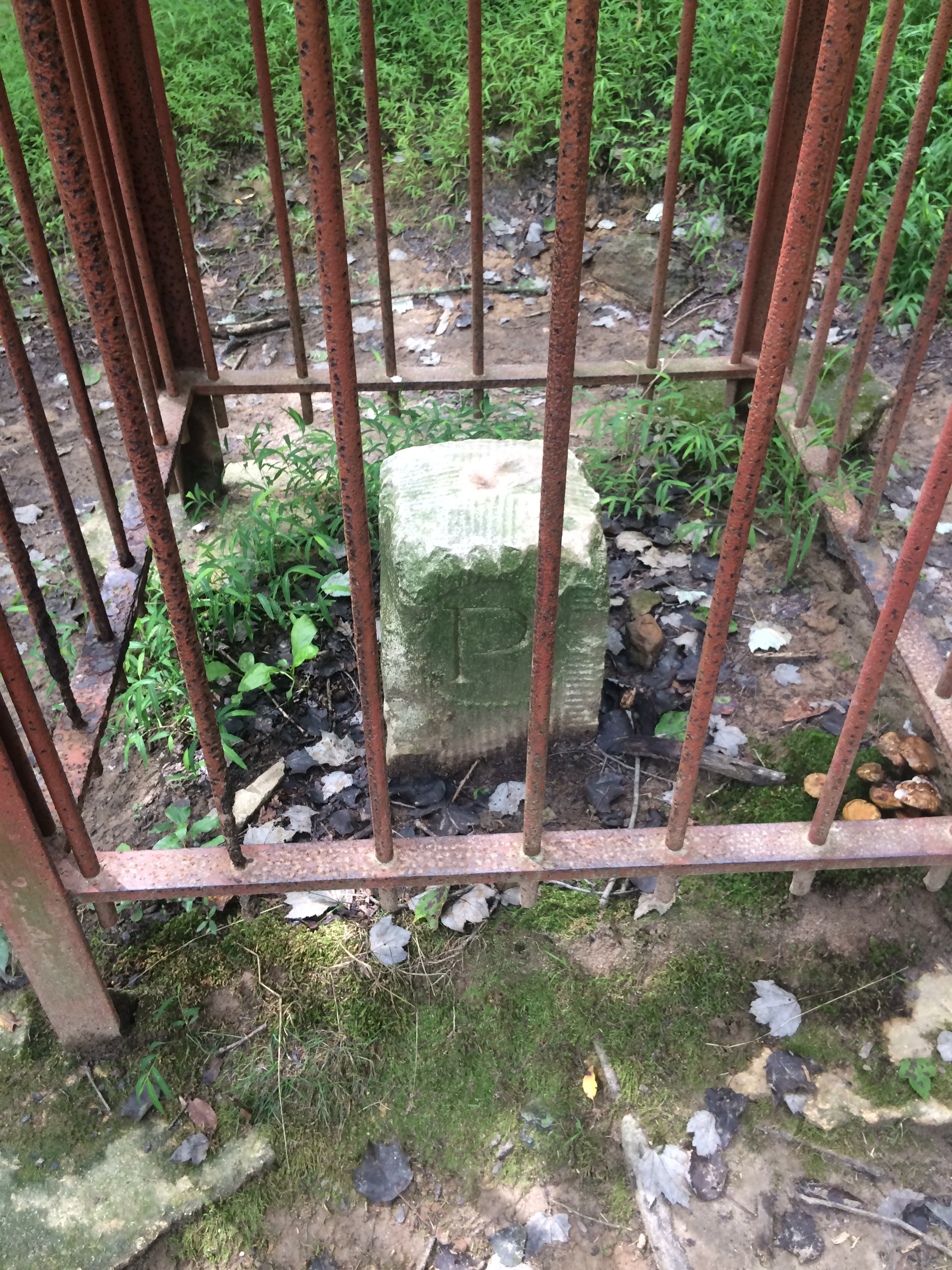
The Mason–Dixon marker found on the property.

The Horseshoe Scout Reservation opened for the first camp season in 1928 under the leadership of Charles M. Heistand. Chester County Council purchased the property from the Reynolds Family, who occupied the land since the late 18th century. At the time, the property was a haven for moonshiners operating illegal stills. When officials from the council first visited, accounts suggest that the moonshiners fled the camp having mistaken their uniforms and campaign hats for those worn by Pennsylvania State Troopers.

In 1956, staff member G. Ernest Heegard established an Explorer Base across the creek from Camp Horseshoe. In 1961, the site was renamed Camp Jubilee to commemorate the fiftieth anniversary of Scouting America. Council training courses were first held there in 1969 and continue to the present day. In 1985 Camp Jubilee was again renamed, this time to its current name, Camp John H. Ware 3rd.

Visitors to the reservation can see the original 18th mile marker stone delineating the Mason–Dixon line.

== Traditions ==
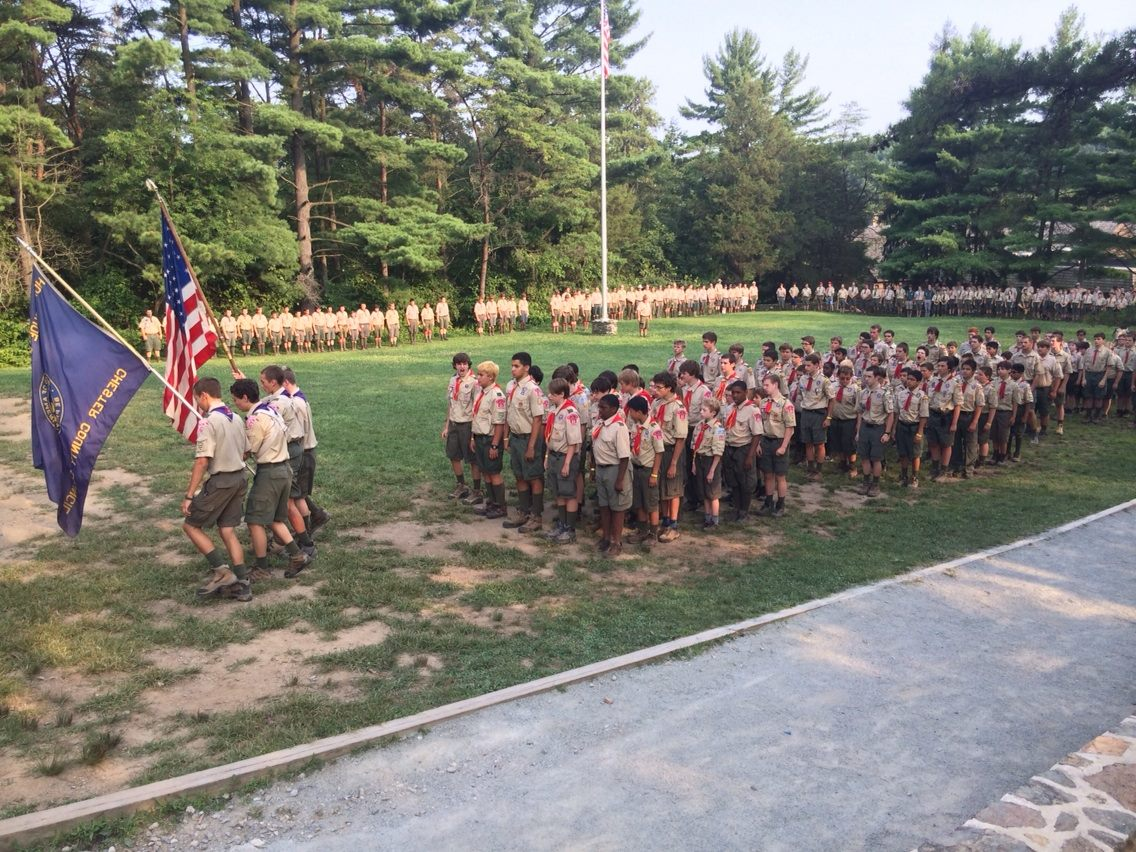
Retreat at Camp Horseshoe

=== Retreat Ceremony ===
This daily observance has changed little since the first camping season over 95 years ago. Scouts and leaders attend in full uniform. Scouts form as a troop, stand retreat, and pass in review. Leaders stand on the review line with the staff. Troops are judged on their marching skills and uniform appearance with a trophy awarded to the winner each evening. The judges consider if the troop is in step with a full stride, holds its ranks, executes a right column and two right flanks properly, and wears a complete Scout uniform.

=== Friday Night Campfire ===
A special closing campfire is held at Achgeketum circle. The Camp Director awards the Horseshoe patch and year segment to Scouts in order of the number of years they have attended camp. After Scout leaders are presented their patch and segment, they remain in the circle to present the "Silver Buckle," an award bestowed on one youth member from each troop who, in the opinion of his fellow scouts, best exemplified the scout oath and law during the week. A scout may only receive the award once. The campfire closes with the staff singing the Horseshoe song.

== Horseshoe Facilities ==
Upon purchasing the property, the members of the council built three buildings: Browning Lodge on the old carriage shed foundation, the Allen Memorial Dining Hall (since expanded), and on the foundation of the old barn, the Kindness Center, a building built with funding from the ASPCA to remind the Scouts not to be cruel to animals. The council repurposed the Reynold's farm house, also known as "The White House" (given the name for its color), where the family lived as an early headquarters and health lodge for the camp until the current buildings were built in the 1940s.

A highlight of the camp is the Olympic-size swimming pool, the largest pool east of the Mississippi River at the time of its construction. The pool was named for Charles M. Heistand, a camp founder.

Five "stockade" campsites were the first to be built- Sherwood Forest, Boonesboro (named for Daniel Boone), Kit Carson, Davy Crockett, and Bayard Taylor. Since then, the camp has expanded to include the following sites: Octoraro, Timberline, Schramm, (Col. Clifton) Lisle, Dan Beard, Rothrock, and Roberts. Five of the new sites consist of two-person tents, while Rothrock and Roberts have Adirondack shelters. Lisle, originally a tent site, was converted to a site with large pavilions.

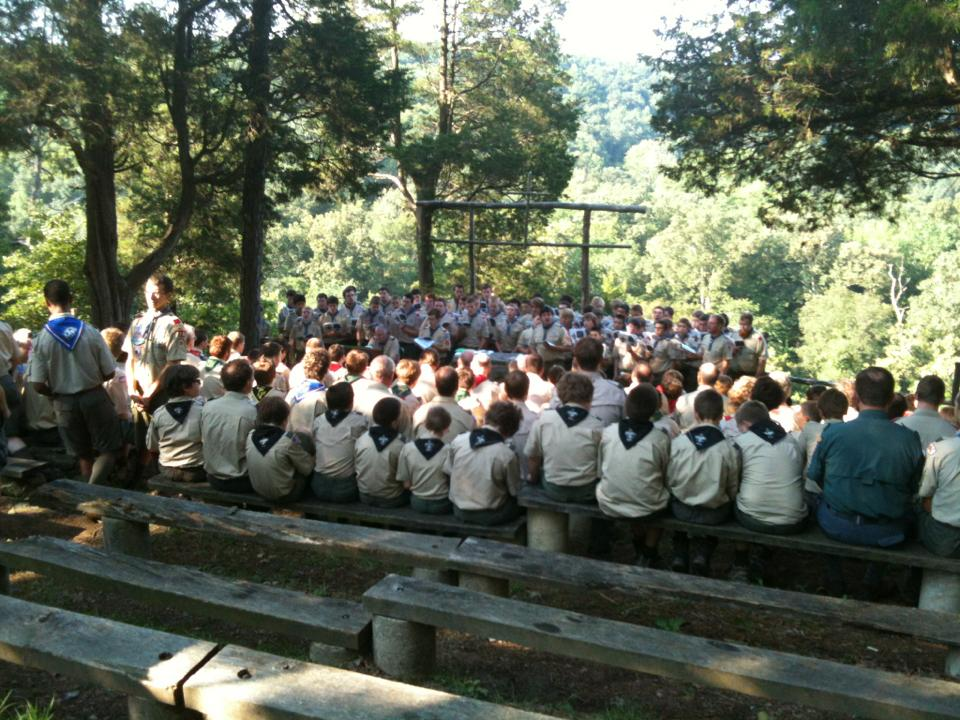
Camp Horseshoe Chapel

Also notable is Achgheketum Circle, the large ceremonial fire circle at Camp Horseshoe. It derives from the Vigil Honor name Achgheketum, which was bestowed upon 29-year camp director Ernie Heegard. Additionally, the camp chapel is located on a hill overlooking the creek.

Other buildings at Camp Horseshoe include the Morrison Health Lodge and the Octoraro Memorial Lodge, which is the Order of the Arrow lodge for Chester County Council. The camp's rifle range is located near Rothrock campsite, and the archery range is near the swimming pool. Newer additions to the camp facilities include a second shower house, William R. Hess Trading Post (called Trader Bill's), and a renovated Parade Field where the retreat ceremony is held.

== Ware Facilities ==
Units staying during summer camp have eight campsites to choose from: Hawkeye, Pathfinder, Deerslayer, Mohican, Jubilee, Leatherstocking, Oswego and Trapper. The sleeping quarters consist of A-frame "butterfly" tents, with two Scouts or adults per tent. During winter camping, the heated two-story Macaleer Lodge hosts campers. The lodge, built in 2004 and known as “Cub Town”, also provides for year-round Cub Scout camping, and transitioned Camp Ware into a Cub-based summer camp.

== Music ==
Camp Horseshoe Song - The Loop of the Octoraro Bend	Camp Ware Song
It all began with the dreams of old The Indian Brave and the Pioneer bold. By campfire light old tales retold, In the Loop of the Octoraro Bend. Those early Scouts with their campaign hats, Their pressed wool shirts, their boots and spats. Rekindled the dream that had gone before, In the Loop of the Octoraro Bend. Chorus: They built a camp upon the Mason-Dixon Line; Historic land where values shine Old Horseshoe you memory will 'er be mine In the Loop of the Octoraro Bend. The sun comes up over Flagpole Hill; Where Old Glory flew and is flying proudly still. And we'll march to the call at the end of the day In the Loop of the Octoraro Bend. So let's hoist our packs once again my friend Where the waters flow round the tranquil Horseshoe bend And we'll hike and we'll camp in the old Scout way In the Loop of the Octoraro Bend. He served the camp upon the Mason-Dixon Line, His years as chief numbered twenty nine, Achegektum your lessons will e'er be mine, In the Loop of the Octoraro Bend.	Listen all as this campfire burns We ask ourselves what was our good turn And what have I done and what did I learn And what will I do 'till I return? Chorus; Camp Ware, at the bottom of the hills Where values hold and scouts learn skills I'll take what I learned and my duty I'll fulfill At dear Camp Ware at the bottom of the hills. As the bright sun sets in the azure sky Darkness come as the embers slowly die I'll keep my head and my spirits high As I bid Camp Ware a last goodbye. Chorus As I walk through life with scouting care As I travel the land and the sea and the air I won't forget what I learned at Camp Ware; The Scout Laws and Being Prepared. Chorus On Scouting's 50th Anniversary; A camp was built in the land of the free They took all the best, and they called it Jubilee; Deep in the hills of the land of the free. Chorus
Words credited to Kevin Grewell and Vance Hein Tune "Beaucatcher's Farewell" by Bob Zentz	Written by John Reilly and Bill Teodecki; Sung to the tune of "Lord of the Dance"
