= List of Order of the Arrow Distinguished Service Award recipients =

Order of the Arrow honorees

Distinguished Service Award
- Distinguished Service Award square knot
- Owner: Order of the Arrow
- Country: United States of America
- Created: 1940
- Recipients: 1,178

The Distinguished Service Award (DSA) is an award presented to Arrowmen who render outstanding service to the Order of the Arrow beyond the lodge level. It is one of the rarest awards in Scouting America, with just over 1,000 awardees in its eighty year history. The following is a list of DSA recipients.

== Recipients ==
- 1940 - 11 Recipients
- Thomas G. Cairns
- Carroll A. Edson
- E. Urner Goodman
- Harvey A. Gordon
- Robert S. Henderson
- Dr. William M. Hinkle
- H. Lloyd Nelson
- Alfred C. Nichols, Jr.
- Joseph N. Pattison, III
- William A. Stumpp
- Dr. James E. West
- 1942 - 3 Recipients - 14 Total
- Joseph H. Brinton
- Thomas J. Keane
- Arthur A. Schuck
- 1946 - 6 Recipients - 20 Total
- Joseph A. Brunton, Jr.
- George W. Chapman
- G. Kellock Hale, Jr.
- William E. Hoffmann
- W. E. Vaughan-Lloyd
- Robert L. Wolff
- 1948 - 3 Recipients - 23 Total
- George A. Mozealous
- J. Rucker Newbery
- John C. Norsk
- 1950 - 3 Recipients - 26 Total
- Herbert L. Gaskin
- Robert H. Heistand
- Wes H. Klusmann
- 1952 - 10 Recipients - 36 Total
- Gerald H. Blake
- Andrew R. Groenink
- Charles M. Heistand
- Richard W. Marshall
- Thomas G. McBride
- John M. Pfeil
- William S. Roth
- Archie F. Wilson
- J. Richard Wilson
- Norman C. Wood
- 1954 - 8 Recipients - 44 Total
- M. G. Boswell
- Dr. Joe C. Carrington, Jr.
- H. Edwin Dike
- Frank W. Hall, Jr.
- Henry J. Henning
- J. Powell Hunter
- Phillip W. Robins
- Scotty Williamson
- 1956 - 11 Recipients - 55 Total
- Herman Brandmiller
- William Durant Campbell
- Jack Champion
- James R. Feil
- Julius Hayworth
- Lyndon S. Holm
- Walter C. Hubbard
- Sidney B. North
- Jack Obermeyer
- Henry Vassel
- James L. Waters
- 1958 - 12 Recipients - 67 Total
- Richard L. Chappell
- Paul A. Siple
- Kenneth K. Bechtel
- John R. Donnell
- David M. Dunbar
- L. George Feil
- Fred J. Gehl, Jr.
- C. M. "Jack" Hedinger
- Carl M. Marchetti
- Harry P. Maxwell
- John F. C. Sheridan
- Russell A. Turner
- 1961 - 16 Recipients - 83 Total
- J. Paul Conover
- John A. Dunaway
- Robert E. Finehout
- Howard Gifford
- Otto C. Hornung
- Daniel S. Ling
- Elliott W. Mangam
- Louis Marchetti
- Richard R. McGee
- Cedric H. Sintzenich
- Ford E. Smith
- Zell Spry
- Donald Carl Thom
- John R. Vaughn, Jr.
- Charles J. Weber
- Willis H. Williams
- 1963 - 14 Recipients - 97 Total
- Mark O. Benner
- A. Thomas Brisendine
- John J. Dowe
- Henry M. Faucett
- William Grant
- Roy M. Hinshaw
- John L. Johnston, Jr.
- J. Allan Lewis
- Michael F. Miler
- Martin Mockford
- H. Banks Newman
- Marion Sadorus
- Dwayne E. Welling
- Thomas K. Winsor
- 1965 - 16 Recipients - 113 Total
- Robert B. Ackerman
- H. Jack Beamish
- James M. Becker
- Milton R. Bossier
- Don Sterling Boyer
- Milton M. Fluegelman
- Ray A. Garrabrandt
- Robert C. Gilman
- James L. Knepler
- Earl P. Leiby
- Joseph Mancini
- Charles B. McKee
- Edgar A. Oglesby
- Frank H. Wadsworth
- William H. Wadsworth
- Morgan W. Weed
- 1967 - 15 Recipients - 128 Total
- Alma D. Banks
- Harold W. "Hal" Cairney
- William R. Clary
- Judson "Jud" Compton
- Michael S. Costello
- Roger J. Frey
- John R. Miltner
- Bruce A. Moore
- Walter W. Nappa
- James J. Petro
- Robert H. Schley
- William E. Slesnick
- Harris M. Tanner
- Gary A. Waldorf
- Arthur B. Wood
- 1969 - 16 Recipients - 144 Total
- David W. Boone
- Marcel L. Cinquina
- Vincent J. Dunn, Jr.
- William Fuller
- Robert C. Griffin, Jr.
- William C. Ingersoll
- Donald Jorgenson
- Dabney Kennedy
- Alvin W. Kidder
- David H. King
- B. Edward Luckett
- Peter J. Osina
- Frederick J. Peters
- Randolph R. Scott
- A. J. Stanovich
- Robert F. Szczys
- 1971 - 21 Recipients - 165 Total
- Louis J. Boggio
- George D. Carr
- Maury M. Clancy
- Harry J. Deyo
- Thomas J. Doran
- Bernard M. Drock
- Thomas E. Fielder
- Alan S. Gaynor
- George E. Harvey
- Mark T. Kempenich
- Francis J. Maguire, Jr.
- Thomas J. McGuire, III
- Russell M. McKinney
- Edward A. Pease
- Raymond C. Petit
- Dennis Prefontaine
- Gerald L. Schomacker
- J. Steve Taylor
- Donald E. Wilkinson
- William D. Winder
- Larry A. Young
- 1973 - 24 Recipients - 189 Total
- Jack C. Biltz
- John F. Blodgett
- David J. Boshea
- Ray Capp
- Randall Cline
- Charles R. Copeland
- Michael Feigenbaum
- Douglas Fleury
- W. Shirell Fox
- Charles C. Gibbs
- Michel L. Goldware
- Kenneth Hayman
- Carl E. Kramer
- Kent Lamoreux
- John McLaughlin
- Wesley K. Morgan
- Paul Pruitt
- Ronald Rupp
- David W. Snyder
- Mark Torbeck
- H. Thomas Trotter
- James Widmaier
- Donald L. Wylie
- Gregory Ziegler
- 1975 - 24 Recipients - 213 Total
- Joe B. Alexander
- Robert B. Alvis
- Alden G. Barber
- Roger D. Billica
- Lonnie L. Bone
- John T. Cox
- Sterly G. Dossmann
- Carl X. Forrester
- Clarence A. Graves
- Greg A. Guy
- Donald J. Hansen
- Clifford D. Harmon
- A. Camp Hopkins, Jr.
- Dennis J. Kohl
- Ned C. Krouskop
- Delbert W. Loder
- Willie J. Long, Jr.
- Steven L. McMurtry
- James R. Neidhoefer
- Richard J. Sanders, Sr.
- Daniel T. Segersin
- Ronald J. Temple
- Thomas J. Webb
- Noel K. Zakin
- 1977 - 29 Recipients - 242 Total
- Joe P. Alexander
- Ronald Amen
- David Avant
- James Richard Barbieri
- J. Fred Billett
- James Bernard Borsig
- Robert J. Bradshaw
- Roscoe R. Bryant
- Kerry Cheesman
- Olvin Alexander Crenshaw
- Kenneth P. Davis
- William F. Downs
- James Y. "Jay" Dunbar, Jr.
- Michael Thomas Feeney
- George Flanagan
- John B. Forrest, Jr.
- Carroll E. France, Jr.
- William E. Grau
- Bradley E. Haddock
- Kevin Holloway
- Walter J. Hrycenko
- James A. Merry
- Paul W. Moore
- Thomas S. Pallone
- Harvey L. Price
- Bruce A. Sanders
- Edward Stumler
- Charles Saunders Wisdom
- Craig Atley Younkman
- 1979 - 30 Recipients - 272 Total
- Albert E. Bender, Jr.
- Jeffrey Bevan Sr.
- Gerald J. Bisson
- Gary H. Bonas, Jr.
- Chris Boswell
- William J. Breland
- William R. Bryant
- Rick Burton
- Carroll J. Carbonneau
- Charles Clabots
- Lawrence J. Ewaska
- Bryce J. Fairbanks
- Bradley K. Harris
- Eric Helgemoe
- Michael H. Holmes
- William F. Ketron
- Ben Lindsay
- Richard MacDonald
- Paul Roy Martinez
- E. Ray Mueller
- Tommy E. Nelson
- Sheridan U. Nunn
- C. Timothy Osborn
- Jay E. Schnapp
- Virgil L. Smith
- Charles S. Sullivan
- Gilson M. Talmadge
- James L. Tarr
- Edward Trust
- David Worland
- 1981 - 39 Recipients - 311 Total
- George Andrews
- Nelson Craig Bass
- Robert Dale Beaty
- Hugh T. Bender Sr.
- Jeffrey Thomas Britton
- Larry Brown
- Paul Webb Carter
- James L. Chandler
- Gary D. Christiansen
- Joseph D. Clark
- James W. Clough
- Richard E. Gingras
- Richard W. Good
- Jerry L. Harben
- Samuel H. Hathaway
- Jeff Herrmann
- William H. Hofmann
- Roger Hoyme
- Eugene Jackson, Jr.
- James E. Johnson
- Brian Kasal
- Joseph Alexander Kuti
- Charles Rowan Lindsay
- Leonard Louis Lucchi
- Robert D. Matthews
- Joseph J. Merton
- J. M. Montgomery
- Danny R. Musick
- Sherwood F. "Rick" Obermeyer
- Robert L. Pattison, Jr.
- Donald A. Peters
- Edgar W. Reeves
- Stephen Douglas Shawley
- Herbert H. "Dusty" Sparks, Jr.
- John Haywood Taylor
- Robert S. Thornton
- Jody Troyan
- Edward J. Wacker
- Stephen F. Willis
- 1983 - 43 Recipients - 354 Total
- Richard M. Aberle
- Kenneth G. Ackermann
- Robert S. Akes
- Mark S. Anderson
- Dale J. Apley, Jr.
- Frank R. Berger
- Kurt E. Christiansen
- Alan B. Cooper
- Phillip Shaw "Ted" Costin
- M. Gene Cruse
- Steven C. Davidek
- Thomas R. Deimler
- Dennis G. Downing
- Richard O. Eberly
- Donald L. Fifield
- Kenneth J. Grimes
- Clifford J. Hanson
- J. Derek Harbin
- William F. Hartman
- Arnold Heck
- Dan T. Hemingson
- Frank T. Hilton
- Mark Hobgood
- Craig H. Kliger
- Raymond L. Lee, Jr.
- James Martin
- Kevin Moll
- Reo E. Nicar
- Karl S. Palvisak
- Carleton D. Ranney
- Gordon P. Rubard
- Kenneth S. Seavers
- Robert M. Shoemaker
- Byron Smalley
- Charles R. Snyder
- Bradley D. Starr
- Thomas C. Steffens
- Thomas H. Tabb
- Thomas N. Taylor
- Billy W. Walley
- R. Fleming Weaver
- Arnold M. Young
- William Ziegler
- 1986 - 49 Recipients - 403 Total
- Mark B. Beese
- Darrel Bieker
- Richard H. Breithaupt, Jr.
- Elton L. Brogdon
- Todd Brohaugh
- Robert E. Burt
- Jack Butler
- Dr. Robert B. Carney
- Daniel J. Churay
- Kurt E. Ewen
- William J. Fortier
- Hal B. Gallop
- Joseph P. Gareri
- Charles A. Garwood
- Esten Grubb
- Michael Hoffmann
- Jason P. Hood
- R. Lynn Horne
- Kevin W. Hula
- Charles Hoyt Hunt
- Michael J. Johnson
- Ted L. Johnson
- Chris Klenk
- Kelly V. Landers
- David A. Lang
- Raymond E. Leonard
- Ben H. Love
- Richard A. Mason
- Robert C. McEachern, III
- Steve Mimnaugh
- David B. Moody
- L. Guy Nirenberg
- Douglas K. O'Connell
- Howard Olson
- Thomas E. Reddin
- Richard C. Rice
- Steven R. Rogers
- Michael C. Sachs
- Eugene J. Schnell
- Stephen C. Sellers
- Matthew H. Sorenson
- James B. Stanton
- Richard A. Sullivan
- David C. Surrett
- James J. Terry, Jr.
- Robert E. Thibault, II
- Rodney T. Ueno
- Robert Wade
- Richard J. Woodward
- 1988 - 48 Recipients - 451 Total
- Glenn T. Ault
- Douglas E. Beaudoin
- L. Ronald Bell
- Billy H. Brackett
- Richard E. Carroll
- C.D. Cash
- Jay T. Cleaver
- Franklin H. Collins
- Eduardo X. De Torres
- Mark M. Dyer
- Philip R. Engelmann
- David A. Erb
- Daniel J. Feigelson
- John R. Foltz
- J. Thomas Ford, Jr.
- Kenneth N. Galloway
- Elmer B. Greey, Jr.
- Charles T. Harbin, III
- Richard R. Harrington
- Robert D. Hath
- James W. Ince
- Jon E. Jones
- Sean P. Keenan
- Arthur F. "Mac" McLean, III
- Larry A. Mobley
- Ronald E. Moranville
- G. Allen Mossman
- R. Brian Naylor
- George Douglas Nelson
- Steven M. Palm
- Rob Patridge
- John Perry
- Christopher T. Retajczyk
- Cary L. Roberts
- R. Kelly Roberts
- James A. Rock
- Mack T. Ruffin, III
- Joseph L. Scalise
- Steven R. Silbiger
- Timothy M. Snellenberger
- Tom Tatham
- Oscar M. Thompson
- Todd F. Trapnell
- Roy C. Walker
- Larry E. Warlick
- Derek W. Wilcock
- James D. Wilson
- Andrew Wright
- 1990 - 37 Recipients - 488 Total
- Donald R. Adkins
- James M. Alexander, III
- John Kevin Bokesch
- Angelo A. Cappelli
- Charles A. Chase Sr.
- Mark J. Chilutti
- Albert C. Christoph
- Gene V. Clemens
- Michael M. Creagh
- Chris Crews
- Wayne L. Dukes
- R. D. Dunkin
- B. Jay Fairbanks, II
- Daniel Fee
- Robert E. Fenty, Jr.
- Rudy Flythe
- David William Garrett
- John T. Gutkoski
- Mark A. Henry
- Wade A. Herbranson
- Kevin K. Hudson
- Gordon A. Knapp
- Richard H. Leet
- Patrick W. McGowan
- Stephen S. Meinhold
- Kerry R. Molin
- Jeff C. Moser
- Charles V. Neil
- C. Randy Piland
- Bobby R. Rainwater
- Louis Romond
- William Rooney
- Brian P. Rudie
- D. W. "Si" Simons
- Michael Southall
- Challen Wells
- Harold A. Yocum
- 1992 - 37 Recipients - 525 Total
- Charles W. Beard
- Christopher S. Belden
- David Brittain Bone
- David Lloyd Briscoe
- Donald K. Chilcote
- Craig Stephen Donais
- William C. Evans
- David P. Fabie
- Dean M. Frommelt
- Jeffrey H. Goldsmith
- Matthew David Hoag
- Grant Michael Howe
- David E. Larkin
- James B. Laycook
- Ryan Mecham
- John Meckley, III
- Kevin Brent Mefford
- C. Mark Miller
- Louis G. Monville, III
- Cort A. O'Neil
- Donald S. Oplinger
- Jeffrey Posey
- Ashley C. Rose
- J. Patrick Ross
- Lawrence A. Ruh
- Charles D. Scales, Jr.
- Theodore E. Shelton, Jr.
- Jack Shumaker
- N. Anthony Steinhardt, III
- Thomas J. Stephenson
- Arthur D. Stevens
- William Story
- Clint E. Takeshita
- Scott A. Valcourt
- Skip Van Bloem
- Matthew M. Walker
- W. Worth Wharton
- 1994 - 36 Recipients - 561 Total
- James B. Arriola
- Justice "Jody" Baird IV
- Raymond N. Batchelor
- Brian M. Beaverstock
- Nelson R. Block
- John Norman Brown
- Steve M. Burinsky
- James F. Campbell
- Michael Celano
- Hewitt Blair Dickens
- Frank S. Dingwerth
- Douglas C. Fullman
- C. Michael Hoover
- Dameon C. Hutto
- J. David Konopka
- John P. Larney
- Todd A. Leonard
- Ronald K. Mahabir
- Loren Bennett Meinke
- J. Todd Metcalf
- Jeffrey G. Middendorf
- Carl Ernst Miller
- Earl Thomas Moore, Jr.
- Robert H. Morrison
- Thomas E. Murray
- Sean Oldroyd
- James William Rhodes
- Raymond J. Ridgway, Jr.
- Craig B. Salazar
- Michael A. Salazar
- Joel S. Shapiro
- Charles P. Taylor
- Bryant Deleron Webster
- Richmond C. Wilkins
- Sheldon Mark Wimmer
- John A. Young
- 1996 - 37 Recipients - 598 Total
- Scott W. Beckett
- Rob Berner
- Ronald Boller
- Kyle B. Brown
- Seth Brown
- Russell P. Cann
- David Clark
- Bill Claycomb
- Sean Cox
- Darshana DeSilva
- Michael Edwards
- Dennis Ellis
- Josh Feigelson
- David E. Halliday
- Charles Haseman
- Christopher Hayes
- Greg Hazlehurst
- Roger Honberger
- John H. Jones
- James Lewis
- Gerald McCurley
- Daniel McDonough, Jr.
- Ryan McFarland
- Branden Morris
- Alyx Parker
- Alex Rhodes
- John Rotruck
- Max Sasseen, Jr.
- Joseph Scionti
- David Shettles
- James Simpson
- William Scott Smith
- Jack Stephens
- Patrick Sullivan
- Matthew Tarnow
- Marty Tschetter
- Charles Wasson
- 1998 - 37 Recipients - 635 Total
- Jason Accola
- John L. Alline
- Jeremiah J. Arnold
- Joseph D. Barton, Jr.
- John K. Berry
- Gregory D. Buckler
- Devang Desai
- Phillip M. Dullock
- Rees A. Falkner
- Anthony J. Fiori
- Clyde "Bud" Harrelson, III
- Marcus Haubenstricker
- John W. Hess
- Brett M. Higgins
- Edgar J. LaBenne
- Joseph M. Marsicano
- Clyde M. Mayer
- Justin D. McCarthy
- Barry P. McFarland
- Brian S. McGrath
- Dr. Richards Miller
- Terrel W. Miller
- Richard L. Mills
- Ryan R. Miske
- Jeremy J. Mo
- Roger A. Ohmstede
- Jason E. Peoples
- Kenneth A. Peterson
- Ryan J. Pitts
- Jere B. Ratcliffe
- Christopher T. Rogers
- James A. Schwab
- Josh Souza
- Dr. Mark Stolowitz
- Kyle E. Tanner
- Todd A. Turner
- Marty Zvonar
- 2000 - 36 Recipients - 671 Total
- Mark Christopher Angeli
- Daniel T. Asleson
- Richard "Dick" Henry
- John C. Bicket
- Peter Arnold Cash
- Benjamin Whitlow "Whit" Culver
- Brandon Fessler
- Michael A. George, II
- Joseph W. Glenski
- David Golden
- Brian S. Hashiro
- John Isley
- Kenneth R. Jenkins
- Ryan King
- Aaron W. Kreager
- William D. Loeble
- Lance McAlister
- Michael P. McCrea
- Seth McFarland
- Mathew Milleson
- Thomas Lee Moore
- Hayato Nakawatase
- William Glenn Parker
- Michael Perkins
- David M. Petrush
- Terry W. "Tee" Pruitt, II
- Jeremy V. Pullen
- Andrew S. Oh
- David H. Sargent
- Robert J. Sirhal
- Joseph A. Shore
- George William Spice
- David Stowe
- David Strebler
- Christopher L. Wells
- Roy L. Williams
- 2002 - 38 Recipients - 709 Total
- Dominique F. Baker
- Justin P. Boren
- Patrick S. Boyd
- Steven D. Bradley
- James Houston Cheatham
- Kenneth L. Connelly
- Michael Devlin Cooper
- Don Cunningham
- Donald G. Diaz
- Joshua G. Gana
- Carl E. Head, II
- David B. Heaton
- Chad F. Heflin
- Jordan A. Hitchens
- Mark F. Hogan
- J. Terry Honan
- Jeffrey J. Jones
- Jason Wayne Kemp
- Kurt A. Kuhlmann
- Bobby Kunstman
- Jason Holmes Laney
- C. Sage Lichtenwalner
- Don McChesney
- Carey Joseph Mignerey
- Carey L. Miller
- Kevin P. Moshier
- Cameron Mulder
- Samuel Nitz
- Benjamin Pharr
- Scott A. Schmidt
- Dale Edwin Siefker
- Thomas D. Slaughter
- Dustin J. Thomas
- Bruce Walcutt
- Jay I. Widby
- Luke C. Wolfe
- David J. Yoder
- Andy V. Zahn
- 2004 - 42 Recipients - 751 Total
- Courtney Allen
- Paul C. Anderson
- Steven Howard Beckett
- Riley Berg
- Cortland Bolles
- Clay Capp
- Andy Chapman
- Edward T. Clifford, III
- Linley Joseph Collins
- Christopher Crowley
- Nicholas P. Digirolamo
- Matt Dukeman
- Adam Enerson
- Brian J. Favat
- Nathan McBride Finnin
- Matthew Ralph Griffis
- Brian Howard Herren
- Jon L. Hobbs
- Kenneth E. Hood
- Stan Hoff
- Benjamin W. Janke
- Douglas M. Kupec
- Matthew J. F. Laudone
- William Lenker
- Brian Francis Love
- Frank McMillan
- Rich Moore
- David Moskal
- James Edward Neubaum
- Dominic T. Pascucci
- Hector A. "Tico" Perez
- Ian M. Pinnavaia
- Douglas W. Seaborne
- Brian Seeton
- Raymond Siegrist
- Douglas S. Smith, Jr.
- George S. Sparks
- Sam Stocker
- P.E. "Gene" Wadford
- Thomas E. Watson, Jr.
- Robert G. Westmyer
- Warren Williams
- 2006 - 39 Recipients - 790 Total
- Ross E. Armstrong
- Marcus Bailey
- Thomas Bain
- Mark Bicket
- Robert Black
- Robert Crume
- Brian Cutino
- Jared Davis
- Seth Dearmin
- Andrew Desilet
- David C. Dowty
- Tyson Ford
- Stephen Gaines
- Keith Gallaway
- Jeffrey Godley
- Michael Gollner
- Christopher Grove
- Jonathan Hardin
- Matthew Harris
- Glenn Haynes
- Jeffrey Hayward
- Paul Jensen
- Jeffery Jonasen
- Scotty Keenan
- Craig Leighty
- Bradley Long
- Edward Lynes
- Seth Mollitt
- Patrick Murphy
- Daniel O'Rourke
- C. Thomas Ritchey
- Gil Rogers
- Robin Rosamond
- David Ross
- Joseph Sadewasser
- Brian Stock
- Michael Lawrence Thompson
- Phil Vanderwerker
- Nicholas Williams
- 2009 - 49 Recipients - 839 Total
- Kevin Lloyd Anderson
- Kyle Wayne Becker
- Michael D. Bliss
- Forrest I. Bolles
- Alexander F. Braden
- Russell A. Bresnahan
- Wayne Brock
- Toby D. Capps
- Evan P. Chaffee
- Jay H. Corpening, II
- Dustin James Counts
- Darrell Woodley Donahue
- S. Tyler Elliott
- Thomas H. Fitzgibbon
- James A. Flatt
- Jonathan Eric Fuller
- T. Alex Gomez
- John H. Green
- Kenneth James Hager
- Adam D. Heaps
- Mark Patrick Hendricks
- Douglas G. Hirdler
- Burl E. Holland
- Don G. Hough
- Michael Stephen Kirby
- Andrew J. Kuhlmann
- Thomas Y. Lambert
- Geoffrey S. Landau
- Andrew P. Martin
- Robert Lewis Mason
- Bruce F. Mayfield
- Robert J. Mazzuca
- Sean M. Murray
- Larry M. Newton
- David J. Nguyen
- James W. Palmer, Jr.
- Ian M. Romaine
- Patrick W. Rooney
- David E. Schaub
- W. Christopher Schildknecht
- Benjamin L. Stilwill
- Francis William "Frank" Sturges, Jr.
- W. Keith Swedenburg
- John Mason Thomas
- Kieran J. Thompson
- Kaylene D. Trick
- Charles Edward Tudor
- Jacob Paul Wellman
- Chad Eric Wolver
- 2012 - 69 Recipients - 908 Total
- Justin P. Abshire
- Brian T. Ahrens
- Timothy D. Babb
- Ryan Drew Bajan
- Michael L. Beckman
- Ryan J. Bell
- Dr. Joseph G. Buchman
- Michael R. Card
- David W. Carlson
- David Mitchel Carson
- Robert Chaballa
- William B. Chin
- Marc H. Circus
- John H. Clark
- Donald H. Combs III
- Travis A. Cunningham
- Jeffrey L. St. Cyr
- Raymond R. Czech
- Daniel T. Dick
- John T. Van Dreese, Jr.
- Joseph Marcuson Dworak
- Richard Paul Ferolo
- Francis D. Fodero
- Dwayne Anthony Fontenette, Jr.
- Richard M. Fore
- Robert W. Fudge
- Calvin J. Fulks
- Joseph M. Garcia
- Brian R. Gray
- Frederick A. Gross, IV
- Jordan E. Hammons
- A. Frank Harper
- David Harrell
- Ryan M. Hay
- Henry Ken Hayashi
- David H. Heimann
- Joshua P. Henry
- Daniel J. Higham
- Jonathan D. Hillis
- Collin Pierce Huerter
- Jess A. Hurwitz
- Mark W. Ishizu
- Howard E. Kern
- Bradford Charles Lichota
- Spencer A. Long
- Matthew Norman Madderra
- Mark Andrew Norris
- Gregory A. Nygren
- John James "Jack" O'Neill
- Nicholas A. Ochsner
- Elam M. Patterson
- Joshua Andrew Peloquin
- Michael R. Philbrook
- Phillip R. Raine
- Scott Anthony Robin
- Sara L. Seaborne
- Thomas Estes Starr
- Jeffery C. Stout
- William Gentry Swingle
- James H. Tarbox
- Timothy E. N. Terry
- John E. "JT" Thomas, Jr.
- William H. Topkis
- Ronnie D. Turpin
- Russell D. Votava
- Deanna J. Castrey-Westmyer
- Teddy W. Williams
- Jason A. Wolz
- MacKinley J. Zewalk
- 2015 - 57 Recipients - 965 Total
- Tyler J. Allen
- Richard D. "Ricky" Angeletti III
- Gregory Wade Bajan
- William Josef Barton IV
- Scott M. Best
- Peter Scott Bird
- Taylor Louis Bobrow
- Ryan Michael Braddy
- Derrick Paul Bransby
- Matthew Edmondson Brown
- Timothy Carlton Brown
- Harry L. Bubeck
- Eric W. Bush
- Raymond T. Cheung
- Brian T. Chrzanowski
- Brian Andrew Corder
- Nicholas G. Dannemiller
- Kevin M. Dowling
- David A. Dye
- Dr. Alan Edward Eggleston
- Barry J.F. Ekle
- Noel Falcon
- Sean Ferrier
- Dr. Robert Michael Gates
- Elliot W. Gault
- Samuel M. Giacalone
- Michael C. Goins
- Michael T. Gray
- Jordan L. Hughes
- Ryan Gregory Jones
- David Bill Joyner
- Michael James Christopher Kintscher
- Paul C. Lackie
- Alan F. Lambert
- Timothy I. Malaney
- Preston H. Marquis
- Daniel B. Maxfield
- Sean R. McCabe
- Isaac McDaniel
- Tracy R. Mesler
- Steve Edward Miller
- R. Gregory Moore
- Craig G. Ongley
- John Martin “Marty” Opthoff
- Colin R. Pinnavaia
- Kyle James Piper
- Samuel Edward Pitts
- John Peter Rehm, Jr.
- Wesley D. Seaman
- Aaron Shepherd
- Michael A. Shostek
- Russell Hoke Smart
- Tyler A. Stepanek
- Mark M. Stickel
- Bradley David Torpey
- Brett Alan Warner
- Brian T. Wilder
- 2018 - 54 Recipients - 1019 Total
- Mitchell L. Andrews
- Robert H. Anstett
- Timothy L. Beaty
- Matthew L. Bell
- Christopher J. Boyle
- Patrick S. Burtchaell
- Alexander C. Call
- Ralph C. “Craig” Davis
- Michael D. DeSocio
- Joseph M. “Joey” Dierdorf
- Steven C. Dupaix
- Bradley J. Ellis
- Harrison D. Fry
- Joe Paul Garcia II
- Forrest J. Gertin
- Taylor J. Giles
- Logan M. Greene
- Glenn J. Greubel
- Stephen A. Grover
- Jonathan T. Hagenow
- Joshua J. Hunt
- Tyler J. Inberg
- Hunter N. Jones
- Benjamin E. Karlsen, Jr.
- Anthony J. “AJ” Kelly
- Bradley A. “Austin” Kriznar
- Alexander I. Leach
- Nathaniel A. Lee
- Manue E. “Manny” Lopez
- Patrick S. Mapp
- Steven P. McGowan
- Donald N. Miller
- Curtis W. Palmer
- Kyle M. Palmer
- Talon B. Parker
- Kyle M. Raffensperger
- Timothy J. Riedl
- Michael J. “Jason” Riley
- Robert C. “Bobby” Robinson
- Robert W. Rodriguez
- Sven J. Rundman, III
- Steve M. Sawyer
- Jeffrey M. Sedlacek
- George M. Soltis
- Donald J. “Donnie” Stephens
- William S. “Scott” Stephens
- Michael B. Surbaugh
- Michael T. Swalberg
- Price M. “Matthew” Watson
- Theodore R. Weiland
- Brent A. Wessel
- Michael F. White
- James S. Williamson
- Robert K. Wong
- 2020 - 53 Recipients - 1072 Total
- Sean M. Alewine
- Samuel J. Aronson
- Tracy P. Atherton
- James A. Barton
- Kenneth E. Barton III
- Jeremy D. Bedient
- Chadd M. Blanchard
- Travis B. Broadhurst
- Shane M. Calendine
- Zachary W. Callicutt
- James G. Castanzo
- Carroll W. "Will" Coots
- Charles G. Coutteau
- Christopher M. Craig
- Connor R. Desmond
- Nina C. Dukes
- John A. Gasink
- Susan B. "Sue" Hampton
- Benjamin L. Harper
- Eric S. Harrison
- Mitchell J. Heisler
- Nicholas T. Hessler
- David P. James
- Jordan D. Jefferis
- Anthony D. Johnson
- Eric B. "Brandon" Kelly
- Robert G. Kennerly, Jr.
- Michael T. Kipp
- Shawn M. Knight
- Mitchell R. Leonard
- Tanner P. Maris
- Bryan A. Melonis
- Collin D. Metscher
- Michael K. Minnis
- Ethan A. Mooney
- Jeffrey J. Morley
- Trinidad Munoz
- Ryan D. Palmer
- Matthew L. Parsons
- Anthony T. Peluso
- Christopher C. Phillips
- Brett A. Randall
- Travis M. Rubelee
- Sidney J. Salazar
- Tracy M. Schultze
- Eric J. Silva
- Justin D. St. Louis
- Brandon R. Stahl
- Nathanael A. "Nate" Steele
- Bradley G. Taylor
- Richard A. Todd
- Richard A. Whitney
- Gary D. Williams
- 2022 - 53 Recipients - 1125 Total
- Dick Amelse
- Brian Bennett
- Matthew E. Bernotas
- Matthew William Bobzien
- Robert Eugene Bolton, Jr
- Kyle Brendel
- Robert "Bobby" M. Brock
- Greg Brown
- Chris Bryant
- Michael Anthony Cavalero
- Gavin Jeen Cho
- Austin Clark
- Henry "Tripp" C. Clark
- Garrett Donais
- Kelsey Files
- Michael Fingar
- Robert E. Fistick
- Brandon Gawel
- Thomas E. Gregory
- Seth Micah Greiling
- Derek Hartley
- Terry Hendriex
- Andrew Scott Jensen
- Michael "Mike" R. Johnson
- Davis N. Kellogg
- Ken Knaebel
- Brian C. Lux II
- Charlie Mauro
- James McClelland
- Roger "Mac" McFarland
- Noah McGovern
- Todd McGregor
- Patrick Joseph McInerney
- Ashton Mills
- Nicholas "Nick" D. Morey
- Dakota Morosi
- Preston Ray Podolske
- Derek John Porter
- Conor Power
- Joseph "Joey" D. Quick
- Anthony "Tony" J. Roman
- Zach Schonfeld
- Aaron Seier
- Kirk Sheren
- Ryan Christopher Showman
- Kyle Silligman
- Noah James Smith
- Andrew "Andy" Hale Spicknall
- Jason W. Stribling
- Ethan Albert Syster
- Michael "Mike" Tangen
- Nathan Andrew Vick
- Tyler Victory
- 2024 - 53 Recipients - 1178 Total
- Ross M. Arnold
- Jeffrey Aster
- Jason Ball
- Timothy Beecher
- Kurt Everett Brown
- Steven Buer Jr.
- Vianney Careaga
- Matthew Carlson
- Adrian Castaneda
- Corey Channell
- Johncarlo Cinelli
- Evan Crocker
- James Delorey
- Benjamin Deveau
- John Donat
- Paul Empie
- Carson Paul Engelmann
- Mike Fowler
- Thomas Franklin
- Sam Gartzman
- Sean Gertsch
- Joseph "Joey" Grabill Jr.
- Zachary Grinvalsky
- Cortney Grosz
- Wade Hartley
- Eli J. Hattersley
- Roger Hoyt
- Darryk Kelly
- Dave Kenneke
- Grant Kim
- Michael Kirby
- Matthew Kusche
- Vincent La Padula
- Carson Lee
- Adam Lucier
- Andrew Line
- Andrew Miller
- Daniel Miller
- Nikolaus K. Newman
- Michael D. Parmer
- Michael J. Payne
- Grant Phifer
- Alexander Pillis
- Timothy Reiss
- Michael "Mac" Richards
- Bradley L. Schmidt
- Peter Selfors
- Catherine Simpson
- Dirk Smelser
- Andrea Watson
- David Werhane
- Michael Whitford
- David Williams
