= Margot Bogert =

American Scouting leader

Secretary of the United States Fund for International Scouting for the Boy Scouts of America
- In office ?

Personal details
- Parent: William Durant Campbell (father)
- Awards: Bronze Wolf; Silver Buffalo Award

Margot Bogert, a world Scouting leader, Chairman of the Board of the Frick Collection and Chairman of the Board of Trustees of Sarah Lawrence College, served as the National Secretary of the United States Fund for International Scouting (USFIS) within the Boy Scouts of America, as well as a member of the World Scout Development Committee. She also served as the Vice-Chair of the World Scout Committee from 1999-2001.

== Background ==
Bogert, a descendant of William C. Durant, the founder of General Motors, was the only daughter of Beatrice Hawn (-1987) and William Durant Campbell (March 18, 1907 - October 20, 1995), an early Boy Scouts of America notable.

In 1988, Bogert was awarded the 198th Bronze Wolf, the only distinction of the World Organization of the Scout Movement, awarded by the World Scout Committee for exceptional services to world Scouting. She and her father are the only father/daughter pair to have received the Bronze Wolf. She is also a recipient of the Silver Buffalo Award.
