= Ray O. Wyland =

Boy Scouts of America national leader

- Born: Ray Orion Wyland; April 15, 1890; Jewell County, Kansas, US
- Died: October 26, 1969 (aged 79); Los Angeles, California, US
- Education: University of Illinois Urbana-Champaign, A.B. Garrett Seminary, B.D. Columbia University, M.A. and Ph.D.
- Employer: Boy Scouts of America
- Known for: Founding advisor to Alpha Phi Omega
- Office: National Director of Education and the Division of Relationships

Ray Orion Wyland (April 15, 1890 – October 26, 1969) was the national director of education and national director of the Division of Relationships for the Boy Scouts of America (BSA). He was a founding advisor to Alpha Phi Omega.

== Early life and career ==
Wyland was born in Jewell County, Kansas. He moved to Ringwood, Oklahoma, in 1902. In 1908 and 1909, he attended the high school in Greenville, Texas, later moving to Danville, Illinois, where he graduated from high school in 1911. Four years later, he graduated from the University of Illinois Urbana-Champaign, with a degree of A.B. and honors in psychology. He then attended the Garrett Seminary in Evanston, Illinois, and received his B.D. degree in 1918. Taking postgraduate courses, he received his M.A. degree in 1929 and his Ph.D. in 1934 from Columbia University.

His family included his wife, the former Miss Ruby Arnold, and their son, Ray O. Wyland Jr.

As managing director of the United American in Illinois from 1919 to 1922, Wyland conducted a training school in Americanization work which resulted in the naturalization of 20,000 aliens. He helped to "Americanize"' several hundred thousand foreign-born citizens.

== Boy Scouts of America ==
Wyland became affiliated with the National Council of the Boy Scouts of America on August 1, 1922. He started as national director of relationships for what was first called the "Bureau of Church Relations" then later the "Relationships Division". He became acting director of education in 1925, then director of education in 1930. He held these positions until 1952.

As director of relationships, Wyland co-ordinated the work of Protestant, Catholic, Jewish, Latter-day Saint and other religious groups in their scouting participation, as well as educational institutions, civic groups, service clubs, fraternal bodies and parent institutions which sponsored scout troops and cub packs.

As director of education, he edited Principles of Scoutmastership (the first training material for scoutmasters in the early 1930s) and other publications.

His doctoral dissertation was Scouting in the Schools: A Study of the Relationships Between the Schools and the Boy Scouts of America. His dissertation advisor was Dr. Elbert K. Fretwell, who became the BSA's second Chief Scout Executive. It was first published in book form in 1934 by Teacher College Press, part of Columbia University.

In 1937, J. S. Wilson met Gunnar Berg and Wyland at Balboa, Panama, on his way to Bogotá, for a conference about mixed-race scouts in the Panama Canal Zone, who claimed British and not Panamanian nationality. It was agreed that they should be taken under the wing of the Canal Zone Council of the Boy Scouts of America but, in 1947, they were transferred directly under the International Bureau as the International Boy Scouts of the Canal Zone.

== Other positions ==
Wyland was a trustee of the Washington Square Methodist Church in New York City, president of the New York Rotary Club, president of the Strathmore Association of Westchester County, gave leadership in Red Cross, United Service Organizations and Community Chest campaigns and was a captain in the Auxiliary Police in World War II.

== Alpha Phi Omega ==
Wyland was a charter member of Alpha chapter of Alpha Phi Omega, having been scout advisor from the inception of the fraternity. He played a large role in the development of the operating policies, constitution and bylaws of Alpha Phi Omega and devising the fourfold program of service for Alpha Phi Omega. His attendance at all of the national conventions until at least 1951 helped with this endeavor.

In 1930, when application was made for approval of Alpha Phi Omega by the National Council of the Boy Scouts of America, Wyland worked hand in hand with Dr. H. Roe Bartle in presenting the facts which brought about a favorable decision and gave Alpha Phi Omega the official sanction of the Scouting Movement.

Alpha Phi Omega honored him by dedicating the 1951 Fall Pledge class to him and awarding him the National Distinguished Service Award in 1956. He represented the national fraternity at the chartering of a large number of chapters in the northeast in the 1940s and 1950s. He was a signatory of the Alpha Phi Omega articles of incorporation in 1968.

== Personal life ==
Wyland died on October 26, 1969 in Los Angeles, California.
