= John R. Donnell Jr. =

American scout

International Commissioner of the Boy Scouts of America

John Randolph Donnell Jr. was the National President of the Phi Kappa Psi fraternity from 1980 to 1982. He was alumni of the Case Western Ohio Epsilon chapter.

John Randolph Donnell Jr. served as the International Commissioner of the Boy Scouts of America. Donnell retired from the World Scout Committee at the World Scout Conference in Durban in 1999.

== Background ==
Son of John Randolph Donnell, he was an Eagle Scout and received the Distinguished Eagle Scout Award.

In 1990, Donnell was awarded the 204th Bronze Wolf, the only distinction of the World Organization of the Scout Movement, awarded by the World Scout Committee for exceptional services to world Scouting. He was also recipient of the Silver Buffalo Award. He was one of only six men to hold all four top-tier Scouting awards, the Bronze Wolf, the Silver Buffalo the Silver Antelope, and the Distinguished Eagle Scout Award.
