= Harvey L. Price =

American scouting leader (1914–2005)

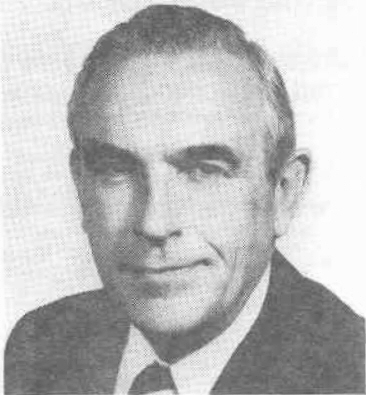
Harvey L. Price

Harvey L. Price (October 5, 1914 – March 26, 2005) was a career professional Scouter in the Boy Scouts of America, and was appointed the sixth Chief Scout Executive of the BSA National Council, serving from 1976 to 1979.

== Early life ==
Harvey L. Price was born in Fort Wayne, Indiana, one of seven children who grew up on his family farm. He graduated from Lancaster Township Central High School, graduating at 1931 and earned his college degree from Wabash College in Crawfordsville, Indiana with the class of 1935.

== Career ==
Harvey L. Price began his BSA professional service in 1937 after graduating from BSA National Training School. He rose through the ranks, serving in a number of roles, including Scout executive of the San Francisco Council (1962–1964), the San Francisco Bay Area Council headquartered in Oakland (1964–1969) and the Los Angeles Area Council (1969–1976) in Los Angeles. He was appointed acting Chief Scout Executive in 1976 following the resignation of Alden G. Barber, and was confirmed in that role in the months that followed.

While Chief Scout Executive, he supported efforts to return some of the more traditional outdoor program emphasis to the Boy Scout program for boys ages 11–17. Under his tenure, William "Green Bar Bill" Hillcourt was recruited to write the 9th edition of the Boy Scout Handbook, bringing back the outdoor orientation of the publication. The National Council also placed significant emphasis on Exploring programs during his tenure, helping councils develop additional kinds of "specialty posts" for teenage boys and girls interested in career exploration.

Harvey Price was awarded the Order of the Arrow Distinguished Service Award in 1977 for his outstanding service to the Order during his professional career.

== See also ==
Boy Scouts of America
Preceded by Alden G. Barber	Chief Scout Executive; 1976–1979	Succeeded by J.L. Tarr
