= Chester County Council =

Scouting America council in Pennsylvania

Chester County Council #539
- Owner: Scouting America
- Headquarters: Oscar Lasko PARC
- Location: Exton, Pennsylvania
- Country: United States
- Founded: January 17, 1919; 107 years ago
- Founder: Arthur A. Schuck
- President: Steve Carroll
- Commissioner: Gus Sauerzopf
- Scout Executive: Jake Segal
- Website www.cccscouting.org

Chester County Council is a Scouting America service council that serves members of the Cub Scouts, Scouts BSA, and Venturing programs in Chester County, Pennsylvania and Northeastern Cecil County, Maryland. It is one of the oldest councils in the nation, and is one of two single-county councils left in Pennsylvania, the other being Chief Cornplanter Council in Warren, PA.

== Organization ==
The council is administratively divided into three districts:

- Diamond Rock District
- Horseshoe Trail District
- Octoraro District

== History ==
The Chester County Council was charted by the Boy Scouts of America on January 17th, 1919. It was charged with overseeing scouting in Chester County under the leadership of Dr. Arthur A. Schuck, who later became the third Chief Scout Executive of Scouting America and who had previously been Deputy Chief Scout Executive under Dr. James West. The council spent much of its early years in the wake of the armistice ending World War I consolidating independent troops into the organization.

In the 1920s, the council, under the leadership of Scout Executive Charles Heistand, underwent significant growth that resulted in the acquisition of a new Scout camp and the formation of its own Order of the Arrow lodge. Initially, Scouts attending summer camp were loaded up onto military trucks, and then shipped out to Camp Rothrock, the council's old summer camp property located near Carlisle, Pennsylvania. The council longed for a camp closer to home, and in 1927 acquired the Reynolds Farm property on the Mason–Dixon line near Rising Sun, Maryland. The new camp, Camp Horseshoe, opened its doors in 1928 and the property was renamed Horseshoe Scout Reservation.

Since the opening of the camp and the founding of the OA lodge in 1927, the council borders have gradually expanded, eventually extending down into Cecil County, Maryland. In 2021, the council established the Oscar Lasko Program, Activity & Resource Campus (PARC) in Exton, Pennsylvania and moved its headquarters to the building the same year.

== Properties ==
Chester County Council operates two camps, Camp Horseshoe and Camp John H. Ware 3rd. Together the camps constitute Horseshoe Scout Reservation. The council also maintains the Oscar Lasko Program, Activity & Resource Campus as its headquarters in Exton, Pennsylvania.

== Order of the Arrow ==
Octoraro Lodge 22
- Totem: Canada Goose
- Owner: Chester County Council
- Headquarters: Exton, Pennsylvania
- Location: Chester County
- Country: United States
- Founded: May 17, 1926; 100 years ago
- Founders: Joseph H. Brinton; Charles M. Heistand
- Website www.octoraro22.org

Octoraro Lodge 22 is the Order of the Arrow lodge affiliated with Chester County Council. The lodge, which takes its name from the Octoraro Creek that flows around Horseshoe Scout Reservation, uses the Canada goose as its "totem" or symbol.

=== History ===
Octoraro Lodge was formed in 1926 under the leadership of Charles Heistand and Joseph Brinton. Heistand, the Council Executive, inquired about starting an Order of the Arrow lodge in the council, and contacted E. Urner Goodman, who was then serving as the National Chief. After a failed attempt to get Unami Lodge in Philadelphia to install its chartered members, Goodman himself conducted the first induction ceremony at Camp Hillsdale near West Chester. Heistand, Brinton, and several other members were inducted, and Octoraro Lodge became the twenty-second Order of the Arrow lodge.

In 1946 members of the lodge traveled south to Norfolk, Virginia and inducted the first members of Blue Heron Lodge 349. Both lodges maintain a good relationship.

== Notable people ==
Because of the council's history, members have gone onto higher office at the Area, Regional, and National levels of Scouting America. A list of those who served at the national level, or in public office, is listed below.

- Bill Folger – President of the American Society For The Adoption Of The Metric System
- Arthur A. Schuck – 1st Scout Executive, later the third Chief Scout Executive of Scouting America
- Hon. Owen J. Roberts – Associate Justice of the U.S. Supreme Court
- Hon. John H. Ware, III – U.S. Congressman from Oxford
- Dick Vermeil – retired NFL coach and member of the council's executive board. His annual "Dick Vermeil Invitational" golf tournaments bring in over $1 million each year to help with council operations.

== See also ==
- Scouting in Pennsylvania
