= Arthur A. Schuck =

Chief Scout Executive

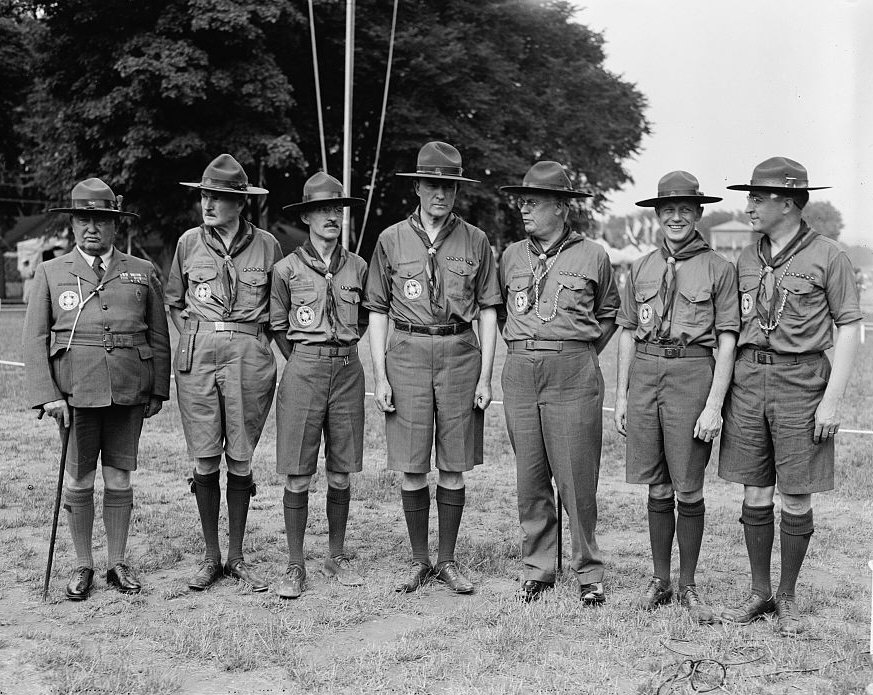
- Arthur A. Schuck (2nd from right) at the 1937 national Scout Jamboree
- Born: Arthur Aloys Schuck; June 20, 1895; Brooklyn, New York
- Died: February 24, 1963 (aged 67); Santa Barbara, California
- Employer: Boy Scouts of America
- Title: Chief Scout Executive
- Term: 1948–1960
- Predecessor: Elbert K. Fretwell
- Successor: Joseph A. Brunton Jr.
- Spouse: Olive

Arthur Aloys Schuck (June 20, 1895 – February 24, 1963) was a long time professional Scouter of the Boy Scouts of America (BSA) who served as the Chief Scout Executive for twelve years from 1948 to 1960.

== Early career ==
Schuck was born in Brooklyn in 1895 and became a volunteer Scoutmaster at age 18 in 1913, while working in a Newark, New Jersey factory. He started his professional work with the BSA in 1917, serving Pennsylvania councils in Lancaster and Reading. He founded the Chester County Council of the Boy Scouts of America in 1919. He was then promoted to region executive of four Mid-Atlantic states, from 1919-1921. When Schuck became a Professional Scouter, he sought to teach boys "to live in friendship without regard for race, creed or color", said the New York Times forty years later in its coverage of the 1957 National Scout Jamboree in Valley Forge, Pennsylvania.

== National service ==
In 1922, Schuck joined the BSA's national office, working in finance and organization. In 1931, he was named director of the division of operations, which he headed until 1943. As director, he was in charge of the first national Scout jamboree in the U.S., held in Washington, D.C., in 1937. He would later become deputy Chief Scout Executive under James E. West, and some thought he would become the next Chief Scout Executive when West retired in 1944. Instead he was passed over for volunteer Elbert K. Fretwell and Schuck then served as the Scout executive for the Los Angeles Area Council for four years until becoming the third Chief Scout Executive of the BSA on September 1, 1948. As Chief Scout Executive, Schuck said the principal purpose of the BSA is: "To give to America a new generation of men of character, with ingrained qualities that make for good citizenship".

== Honors ==
Schuck was awarded the Silver Buffalo Award and was also honored by several scout associations in other countries. The World Scout Committee of the World Organization of the Scout Movement conferred the Bronze Wolf Award upon Schuck in 1960, for exceptional services to world Scouting. The Freedoms Foundation at Valley Forge presented Schuck with its highest honor, the George Washington Honor Medal, in 1952 for the BSA's support of a "Get Out the Vote" campaign. In 1957 he received the highest distinction of the Scout Association of Japan, the Golden Pheasant Award.

== Death ==
Schuck died in a Santa Barbara, California, hospital in 1963, at age 67. He was survived by his wife, Olive, and a son and daughter.

Boy Scouts of America
Preceded by Elbert K. Fretwell	Chief Scout Executive; 1948-1960	Succeeded by Joseph A. Brunton Jr.
