= Monte Carlo Ranch =

- Location within Kenya
- Coordinates: 0.33°S 36.93°E
- Country: Kenya
- County: Nyeri
- Time zone: UTC+3 (EAT)

Monte Carlo Ranch is a settlement in Nyeri County in Kenya. It is named after the Monte Carlo Ranch House, which was built here in 1937 by William D. Campbell.

Another ranch house originally called Steep was built two years earlier by the couple Mickey and Dot Lyons, at 2 miles distance on the slopes of a hill called Ol Dionyo Larash. Steep was converted into a lodge in 1967, it is currently called the Aberdare Country Club. Both houses face Mount Kenya with the Aberdare Forest, which is part of Aberdare National Park, behind them.
