= John Randolph Donnell =

- Born: June 22, 1912; Findlay, Ohio
- Died: September 8, 2004 (aged 92); Newport, Rhode Island
- Occupations: Oilman, banker and philanthropist
- Known for: Served on the board of the World Scout Foundation

John Randolph Donnell (June 22, 1912, Findlay, Ohio – September 8, 2004, Newport, Rhode Island) was an oilman, banker and philanthropist, who served on the board of the World Scout Foundation. Donnell was a 1958 recipient of the Silver Buffalo Award.

== Background ==
Donnell was awarded the Bronze Wolf, the only distinction of the World Organization of the Scout Movement, awarded by the World Scout Committee for exceptional services to world Scouting. Donnell was devoted to the Boy Scouts of America. He was awarded the Silver Antelope, the Silver Beaver, and the Silver Buffalo, the National Council's highest honor, in 1958. In his later years he was on the board of the World Scout Foundation, and for his service, was awarded the Bronze Wolf.

He received a Bachelor of Science degree in electrical engineering from Case Institute of Technology, now Case Western Reserve University, in Cleveland, Ohio, where he joined the Phi Kappa Psi fraternity.

His grandfather James C. Donnell founded the Ohio Oil Company, renamed the Marathon Oil Co. in 1962. Donnell joined the Ohio Oil Co. in 1936 as special representative, in 1954 he became a director and vice president in charge of supply and transportation, and from 1961 until 1966, he was responsible for the company's worldwide activities with the title of president of international operations.

In 1954, he was elected to the board of Case Institute of Technology, and in 1967 to its successor, Case Western Reserve University.

== Personal life ==
His son was John R. Donnell Jr. who also received the Bronze Wolf.
