= Alden G. Barber =

American scouting executive

- Born: March 1, 1919; Chico, California, U.S.
- Died: January 17, 2003 (aged 83); San Ramon, California, U.S.
- Education: Chico State College
- Employer: Boy Scouts of America
- Title: Chief Scout Executive
- Term: 1967–1976
- Predecessor: Joseph Brunton
- Successor: Harvey L. Price
- Spouse: Mitzi Lee Barber
- Children: 4
- Military career
- Allegiance: United States
- Branch: U.S. Army Air Corps
- Conflicts: World War II

Alden G. Barber (March 1, 1919 – January 17, 2003) was a long-serving professional Scouter for the Boy Scouts of America, and served as the fifth Chief Scout Executive of the BSA from 1967 to 1976. He served during the peak membership years of the BSA, and was instrumental in modernizing the BSA program, particularly the Boy Scout program for boys ages 11 to 17.

== Early life ==
Alden G. Barber was born in 1919 in Chico, California. He became a Boy Scout at age 12 in 1931 in Chico, California. He attained the rank of Eagle Scout. In 1935, he graduated from Chico High School. Barber then attended Chico State College (now California State University, Chico) and majored in science and English.

== Personal life ==
Barber and his wife Mitzi Lee Barber had three daughters and one son: Sharon, Susan, Maryann, and Mark.

== Career ==
After college, Barber became a reporter and editor for the Chico Record. In 1940, Barber became a district executive in Santa Monica, California. During the World War II era, he served as officer an Army Air Corps bombardier. In 1946, he returned to his position in Santa Monica before serving as assistant Scout Executive in West Los Angeles. He became the Buttes Area Council Executive in Marysville, California. During 1952 and 1953 he worked closely with volunteers to identify a new summer camp site in the Sierra Nevada mountains near a lake. They found Lake Sterling, a Pacific Gas & Electric reservoir, and discovered that it was within 5 miles (8.0 km) of 13 other small lakes suitable for back country treks. They established Camp Robert L. Cole at the site. He then was hired as the Council Executive in the Golden Empire Council in Sacramento, California, and later in Chicago, Illinois.

In October 1967, he was appointed by the BSA National Executive Board as Chief Scout Executive. During his tenure, there was a strong membership development emphasis called "Boypower 76" which stressed the goal of reaching a representative one third of all boys in the country by serving more minority youth and urban youth. He worked with volunteers and staff to reshape program elements for the core Boy Scouting program during a major 1972 revision. These major changes included a completely new Scout Handbook, complete revision of Boy Scout rank advancement requirements, addition of "skill awards", and multiple uniform options (including the introduction of the visor cap and beret). Some program changes were well received, but other changes, particularly those that emphasized urban activities over camping and out-of-town trips, were criticized. He resigned his position before the normal retirement age, due in part to BSA experiencing membership declines and internal issues.

After retirement from the Boy Scouts of America (nationally), in 1982, Alden and wife Mitzi moved to San Jose, California, where Alden joined the staff of the Santa Clara County Council, Boy Scouts of America as the Director of Finance and Boy Scout Memorial Foundation.

A high-adventure program for Exploring was started with wilderness base camps, including the Philmont Scout Ranch in northern New Mexico.

=== Awards and recognition ===
Barber was a recipient of the Distinguished Eagle Scout Award. He was also a recipient of the Bronze Wolf Award, the only distinction of the World Organization of the Scout Movement, awarded by the World Scout Committee for exceptional services to world Scouting. In his retirement, he was the honoree and guest speaker at a number of local council events.

== Death ==
Barber died of a stroke on January 17, 2003, at San Ramon Regional Medical Center in San Ramon, California.

Boy Scouts of America
Preceded by Joseph A. Brunton Jr.	Chief Scout Executive; 1967-1976	Succeeded by Harvey L. Price
