= Elbert K. Fretwell =

American academic and Boy Scouts leader (1878–1962)

2nd Chief Scout Executive
- In office 1943–1948
- Preceded by: James E. West
- Succeeded by: Arthur A. Schuck

Personal details
- Born: 1878
- Died: 1962 (aged 83–84)
- Children: Elbert K. Fretwell Jr.

Elbert K. Fretwell (1878–1962) was an American academic and early leader in the field of youth development through recreation and extracurricular activity. He served as the second Chief Scout Executive of the Boy Scouts of America (BSA), serving from 1943 to 1948. Upon his retirement from the BSA, Fretwell was given the title of Chief Scout.

His son Elbert K. Fretwell Jr. was also a noted professor of education and served as Chancellor of University of North Carolina at Charlotte.

== Academia ==
Fretwell was an associate professor of Scouting and recreational leadership and later, professor of education at the Teachers College, Columbia University.

In 1918 Fretwell was appointed by the Surgeon General of the United States together with the American Red Cross to supervise recreation work in United States Army "reconstruction hospitals."

== Boy Scouts of America ==
Fretwell was a volunteer for many years in the Boy Scouts of America. He was recognized for his services with the Silver Buffalo Award in 1939. He also received the Silver Tamaraw of the Boy Scouts of the Philippines.

Upon the retirement of Dr. James E. West in 1943, Fretwell was appointed Chief Scout Executive and served until his retirement in 1948.

In 2017, the Boy Scouts of America established the E. K. Fretwell Outstanding Educator Award. The award recognizes school and school district personnel for modeling the values of Scouting in their professional life.

== Partial list of works ==
- Extracurricular Activities in Secondary Schools, EK Fretwell - 1931 - Houghton Mifflin Company
- The School Assembly, EK Fretwell - Sixth Yearbook, National Association of Secondary School Principals, 1922
- Survey of the Public Schools of Philadelphia. Vol. IV, EK Fretwell - The Public Education and Child Labor Association
- Extra-Curricular Activities of the Boys' High Schools, EK Fretwell - Baltimore Survey, 1920

== See also ==
Boy Scouts of America
Preceded by James E. West	Chief Scout Executive; 1943-1948	Succeeded by Arthur A. Schuck
