= James E. West (Scouting) =

American lawyer and Boy Scouts leader (1876–1948)

James Edward West
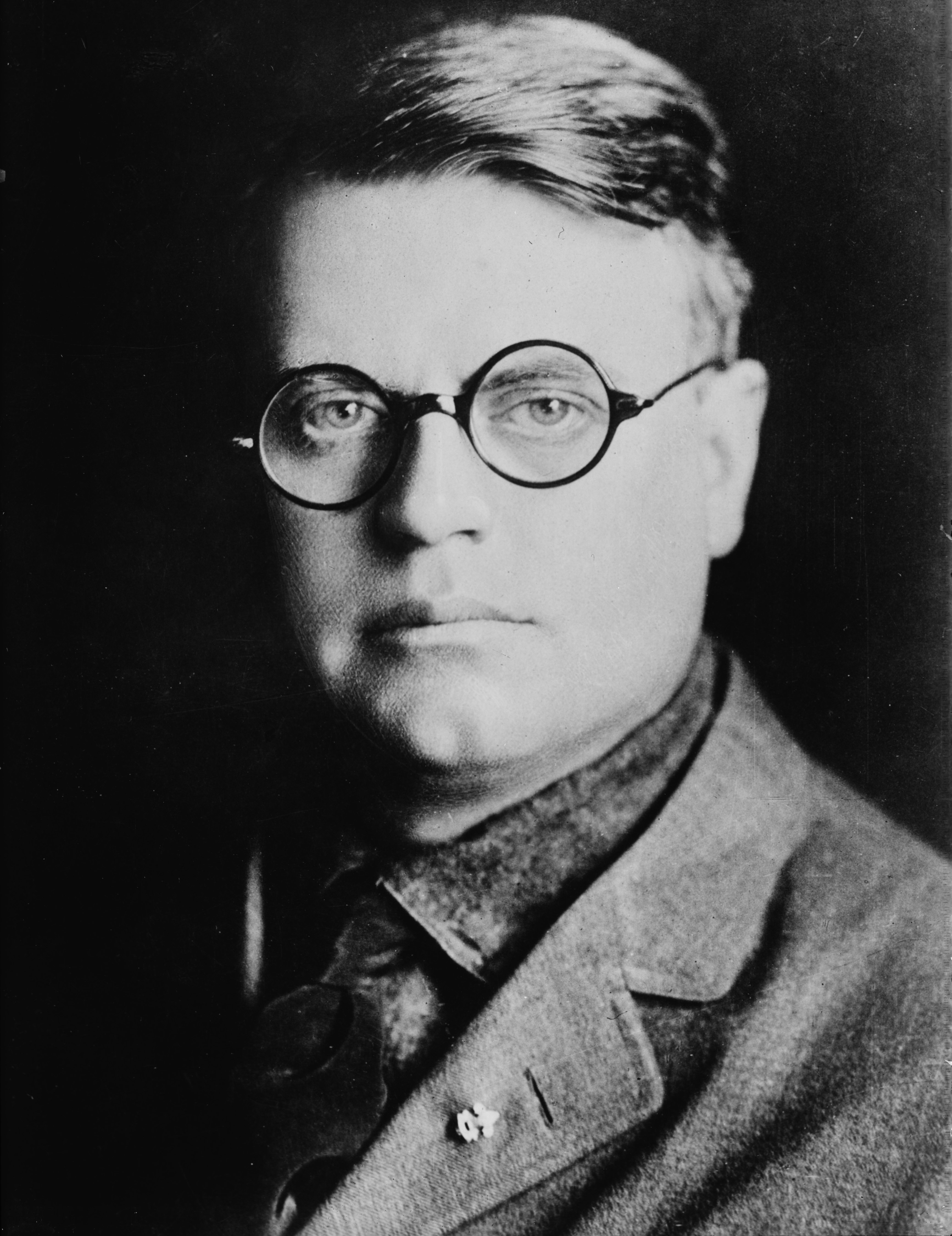
- West in 1918

1st Chief Scout Executive
- In office 1911–1943
- Preceded by: Position established
- Succeeded by: Elbert K. Fretwell

Personal details
- Born: James Edward West; May 16, 1876 Washington, D.C.
- Died: May 15, 1948 (aged 71)
- Resting place: Kensico Cemetery, Valhalla, New York
- Occupation: Chief Scout Executive
- Known for: Boy Scouts of America
- Awards: Silver Wolf Award; Silver Buffalo Award; Distinguished Service Award of the Order of the Arrow; Honorary Alpha Phi Omega brother

James Edward West (May 16, 1876 – May 15, 1948) was a lawyer and an advocate of children's rights, who became the first professional Executive Secretary, soon renamed Chief Scout Executive, of the Boy Scouts of America (BSA), serving from 1911 to 1943. Upon his retirement from the BSA, West was given the title of Chief Scout.

== Personal life ==
West's father died around the time of his birth in Washington, D.C. His mother was hospitalized with tuberculosis in 1882 and young Jimmie was placed in the Washington City Orphan Home; his mother died later that year. In 1883, he was diagnosed with tuberculosis, and by 1885 he was crippled, with one leg shorter than the other. At the orphanage, Jimmie was put to work with the girls, sewing and caning chairs. He became a voracious reader and took charge of the orphanage library. After convincing the staff that he could continue his chores (stoking the furnace and caring for chickens) he entered public school at the fifth grade. In 1895, he graduated with honors from Business High School, where he had edited the school newspaper, was business manager of the football team and had acted as a substitute math teacher.

In late 1896, West was out of the orphanage and working as a tutor and as a bicycle mechanic. He attended National Law School while working as the assistant to the general secretary of the YMCA, and during the Spanish–American War, he acted as general secretary. He later worked as a clerk in the War Office. He received his Bachelor of Laws in 1900 and Master of Laws in 1901 and was admitted to the Washington, D.C. bar. President Theodore Roosevelt appointed him to the Board of Pension Appeals in the Department of the Interior in 1902. He was instrumental in establishing the juvenile court system, pushing a bill through Congress.

West was a Mason, a member of the Knights of Pythias and the Sunday school superintendent for the Mount Pleasant Congregational Church. In the early 1900s, he was the finance chairman for the Boys' Brigade and the secretary of the Washington Playground Association, later the Playground Association of America. He later served as secretary of the National Child Rescue League, responsible for placing orphaned children into homes. West was then the secretary of the White House Conference on Dependent Children, pushing for reforms in the management of orphanages.

In 1910, West was looking to open a private law office. Meanwhile, John M. Alexander was serving as Managing Secretary from May to October, under the general auspices of Edgar M. Robinson, who had set up BSA's original one-room national office and recruited Alexander to run it. Neither Robinson nor Alexander wanted to run BSA permanently, so Colin H. Livingstone, the president of the BSA put out inquiries. Ernest Bicknell of the American Red Cross wrote to Luther Gulick, president of the Playground Association of America and recommended West for the position. After much persuasion West finally accepted the position on a temporary basis and moved to New York City, while Robinson returned to the YMCA and turned BSA's reins over to West. The Russell Sage Foundation provided the initial funding for West to become the first Chief Scout Executive of the Boy Scouts of America. He initially accepted for a six-month tenure, but he held the position for 32 years.

West married Marion Speaks on June 19, 1907. Their children were: James "Jimmie" Ellis West (December 25, 1909 – 1916), Arthur (born 1912), Marion (born 1915), Helen (born 1916), and Bob (born 1917). Jimmie died of pneumonia in 1916 while Marion West was pregnant with Helen. Their daughter Marion West Higgins would go on to serve as the first female Speaker of the New Jersey General Assembly. His great-great-grandson Tucker West is an Olympian.

== Scouting ==
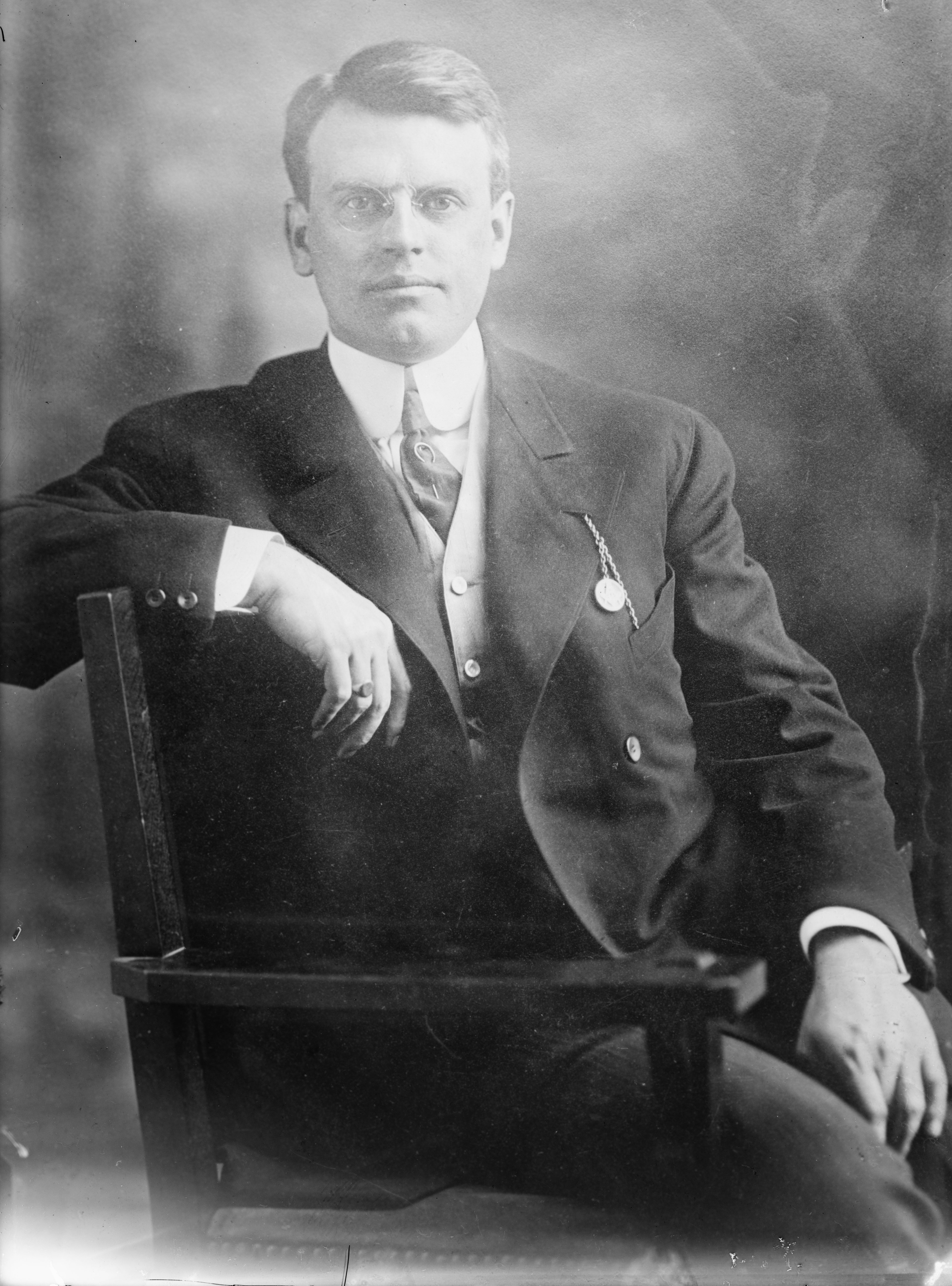
West c. 1913

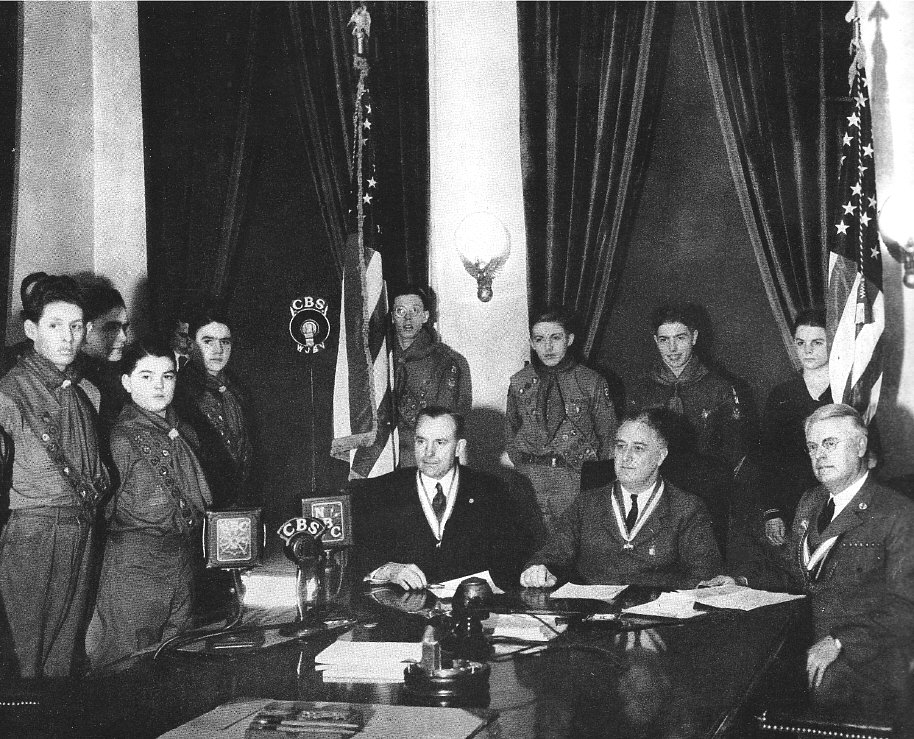
James E. West at the White House, with U.S. President Franklin D. Roosevelt and Walter W. Head, BSA national president (seated, left) in 1937

The new BSA office on 5th Avenue opened in January 1911 with West at the helm and the movement began to grow at a rapid pace. Sixty local councils were organized in January and hundreds of Scoutmasters were commissioned. The office grew from six to thirty-five employees by May. One of his first tasks was the first edition of The Official Handbook for Boys. West was instrumental in expanding the third part of the Scout Oath:

To help other people at all times; to keep myself physically strong, mentally awake and morally straight.

He also pushed to add three points to the Scout Law: brave, clean, and reverent. West changed his title, and in November 1911 he became the first Chief Scout Executive. His starting salary was $4,000 per year and was raised to $6,000 per year in July (equivalent to about $156,000 in 2017).

West dealt with many early issues. Labor unions protested over wording in the original Official Handbook that had been copied from the British Scouting for Boys that was perceived as anti-union — this had already been removed from the first edition. West also dealt with those who protested against the inclusion of African Americans. West held that they should be included, but that local communities should follow the same policies that they followed in the school systems. Thus, much of the American South as well as many major northern communities had segregated programs with "colored troops" until the late 1940s, with some councils not fully desegregated until 1974. Since the BSA had early and enduring ties with the YMCA, a firmly Protestant organization, the Roman Catholic Church initially forbade their boys to join. West successfully argued that Scouting was non-sectarian and the Catholics accepted the BSA program in 1913.

As early as 1910, Daniel Carter Beard and Ernest Thompson Seton had various arguments over who was the founder of Scouting. Programs for boys had been advanced by Seton in 1902, Beard in 1905 and Baden-Powell in 1907. Since Baden-Powell had based parts of the program on Seton's work, Seton claimed to be the founder. By 1915, the conflicts between them had escalated and West attempted to defuse the situation. This led directly to the creation of Horseshoe Bend Scout Ranch.

Beard and Seton did not get along with West. Seton had different goals for the program and views of how Scouting should develop. Both Seton and Beard saw West as a city lawyer and administrator. Seton often challenged West's authority, often to his own detriment. The National Executive Board did not re-elect Seton as Chief Scout in 1915, and he soon stopped publishing in Boys' Life. By early 1916, Seton was officially out of the BSA program, and most of his contributions were removed from the 1916 edition of the handbook. West also clashed with the BSA's founder, William D. Boyce, who eventually left the BSA in January 1915 to found the Lone Scouts of America (LSA). LSA initially flourished but had to merge back into the BSA in June 1924. West even had Boyce's name erased from BSA records for years. Competition from another organization, the American Boy Scouts, caused West to seek a federal charter for the BSA, granted on June 15, 1916.

In the years before World War I, pacifism and patriotism often came into conflict, and the BSA was sometimes in the middle. Some thought that the BSA was too militaristic, especially as characterized by their military-style uniforms and discipline, while others felt that the BSA was unpatriotic in their stance against military training. In 1912, a member of the American Boy Scouts (ABS) shot another boy by accident. West quickly distanced the BSA from the ABS program and any military training or discipline. He refused to allow the BSA supply group to sell the Remington rifle endorsed by the ABS and de-emphasized the Marksmanship merit badge. The National Rifle Association lobbied the executive board to issue the badge. In 1914, Colonel Leonard Wood resigned from the board after a pacifistic article was published in Boys' Life that he considered to be "almost treasonable". After Theodore Roosevelt admonished West, he toned down the rhetoric and later began to issue the Marksmanship merit badge again.

West fiercely defended the use of the term "Scout" and the right to market Scouting merchandise. By 1930, West claimed to have stopped 435 groups from unauthorized use of "Scouting"; both as part of an organizational name and in the use of commercial products. When the Girl Scouts of the USA started, West discouraged the program. In 1911, West worked with Luther Gulick when the Camp Fire Girls were established and always considered them to be the sister program of the BSA. When the Girl Scouts refused to give up their name in 1918, West appealed to Baden-Powell with no results. Lou Henry Hoover became the president of the Girl Scouts in 1922 and First Lady in 1929; West then stopped his campaign to rename the Girl Scouts.

External image
- July 12, 1937 cover of Time magazine

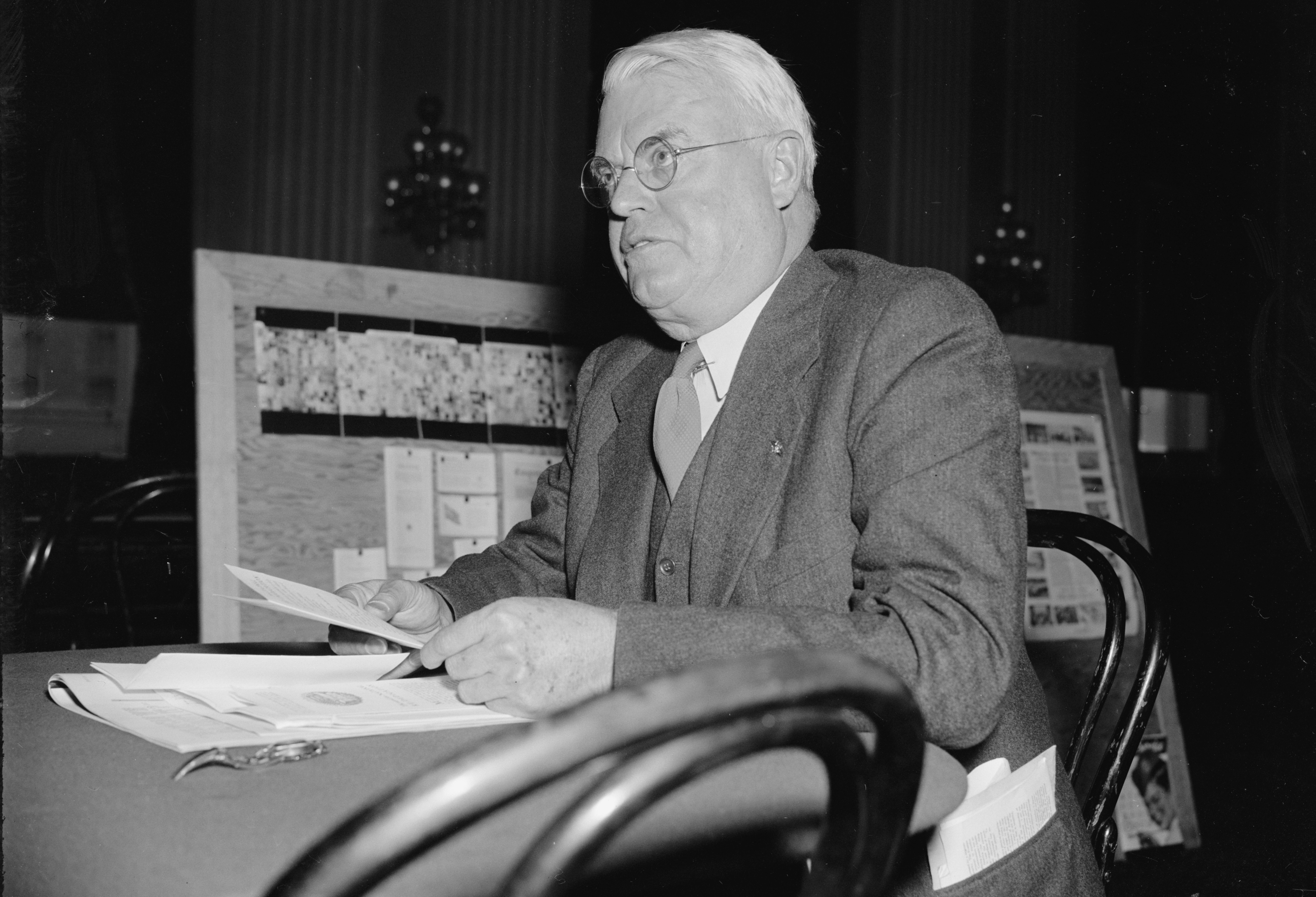
West in 1939

West negotiated the purchase of Boys' Life in 1912, making it the official magazine of the BSA. He began a campaign against pulp fiction and introduced a library of recommended books. The BSA celebrated West's 25th year as Chief Scout Executive by commissioning a portrait by Albert A. Rose. The portrait was featured on the July 12, 1937 cover of Time in recognition of the first national Scout jamboree. In the portrait he is seen wearing the Silver Wolf Award presented to him in 1920 by Baden-Powell at the 1st World Scout Jamboree.

== Legacy ==
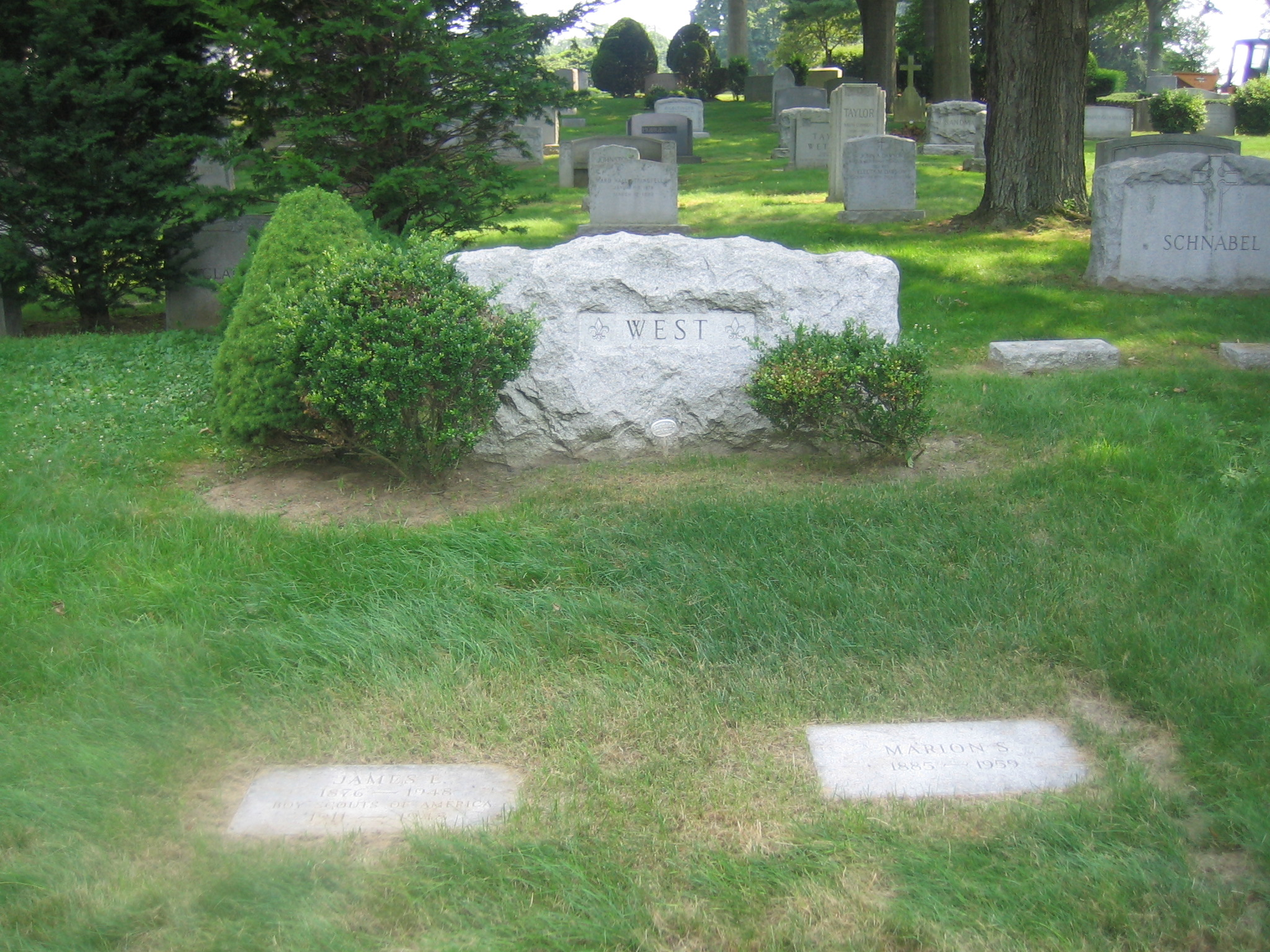
Grave of James E. West

The highly organized national structure that West created was a key to the BSA's growth and reputation. He initially was not in favor of the Cub Scouting program for younger boys, feeling that its creation would take attention away from the main programs, Boy Scouts and Explorer Scouts for youths aged 11–17. He was convinced by the popularity of pilot programs in America that were similar to Wolf Cubs in England and Canada, and Cub Scouting was eventually introduced in 1930.

After West retired as Chief Scout Executive, Dr. Elbert K. Fretwell succeeded him. Upon retirement, West was given the title of "Chief Scout" of the BSA, the same title that Seton had held. West served on the World Scout Committee of the World Organization of the Scout Movement from 1939 until 1947. He lived in New Rochelle in Westchester County, New York and is buried in Kensico Cemetery in nearby Valhalla.

In 1993, the BSA created the James E. West Fellowship Award for individuals who contribute $1,000 or more in cash or securities to their local council endowment trust fund.

Several Scout camps nationwide have named campsites after West in recognition of his monumental work for Scouting. These camps include but are not limited to:

- Camp James E. West - Operated by the Chicago Area Council from 1921-1970, Owasippe Scout Reservation, Whitehall, Michigan.
- Campsite James West - Camp Sandy Beach, Yawgoog Scout Reservation, Rockville, Rhode Island
- Campsite James E. West - Baiting Hollow Scout Camp, Baiting Hollow, New York.
- Campsite James E. West - Camp Roosevelt, Eddington, Maine.

== Partial list of works ==
- Lone Scout of the Sky. 1927. "A biography of Charles Lindbergh"
- Ellsworth, Lincoln (1931). "The First Crossing of the Polar Sea". In West, James E. (ed.). The Boy Scout's Book of True Adventure, Fourteen Honorary Scouts. G. P. Putnam's Sons. LCCN 31006247. "Foreword By Theodore Roosevelt and biographical notes by James E. West
  Essays include: "Scouting Against the Apache" by Frederick R. Burnham, "How I Learned to Fly" by Orville Wright, "An Arctic Mirage" by Donald B. MacMillan, "Adventurous Hunting" by Kermit Roosevelt, "In the Arctic" by Lincoln Ellsworth, "A Tobacco Trade" by George Bird Grinnell, "The Black Ghosts of the Tana River" by James L. Clark, "My Flight Over the Atlantic" by Richard E. Byrd, "In the Jungles of Cochin-China" by Theodore Roosevelt, "Shipwreck" by Robert A. Bartlett, "Written in the Air" by Charles Lindbergh, "Tiger! Tiger!" by Merian C. Cooper, "The First Crossing of the Polar Sea" by Lincoln Ellsworth, "Bandits" by Clifford H. Pope, and "Adventure" by Stewart Edward White. All 13 photo plates of the honorary Scouts are present; both Roosevelts in the same photo."
- The Boy Scout's Book of Honor. 1931. "edited by James E. West"
- He-who-sees-in-the-dark; the boys' story of Frederick Burnham, the American scout. illustrated by Baden-Powell. 1932. OCLC 1710834. "by James E. West and Peter O. Lamb"
- Making the Most of Yourself. 1941. "Collection of his Boys' Life columns"

== See also ==
- Scouting memorials

Boy Scouts of America
New title	Chief Scout Executive; 1911-1943	Succeeded by Elbert K. Fretwell
