= Silver Buffalo Award =

National-level service award of Scouting America

- Silver Buffalo medal and square knot
- Owner: Scouting America
- Country: United States
- Created: 1925
- Awarded for: Distinguished service to the nation’s youth
- Recipients: 904 (2026)
Previous; Silver Antelope Award	Next; Silver World Award

The Silver Buffalo Award is the national-level distinguished service award of Scouting America. It is presented for noteworthy and extraordinary service to youth on a national basis, either as part of, or independent of the Scouting program. The award is made by the National Court of Honor and the recipient need not be a registered member of Scouting America.

== Award ==
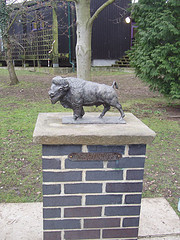
Buffalo Statue, donated to Gilwell Park by the Boy Scouts of America in 1926

The award consists of a silver buffalo (American bison) medal suspended from a red and white ribbon worn around the neck. Recipients may wear the corresponding square knot, with a white strand over a red strand, on the Scouting America uniform.

Using the United States military as the model, silver awards are the highest awards in Scouting America.

== History ==
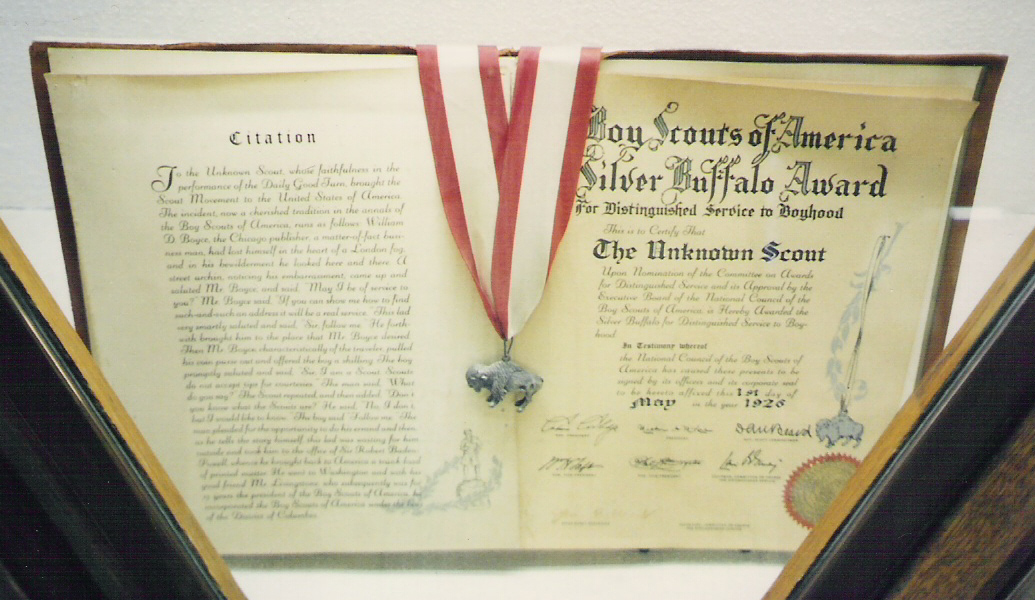
Silver Buffalo award and citation presented to the Unknown Scout

The Silver Buffalo Award was created in 1925 based on the Silver Wolf Award of the Boy Scout Association. The buffalo pendant was designed by A. Phimister Proctor. A red-white-red ribbon bar was introduced in 1934 for informal uniform wear. In 1946, ribbon bars were replaced by the current square knot insignia.

During the first presentation in 1926, twenty-two awards were presented in a particular order determined by Chief Scout Executive James E. West. Since then, the awards have been presented on an annual basis in alphabetical order. The first Silver Buffalo Award was conferred upon Lord Baden-Powell, founder of the Scouting movement and Chief Scout of the World. This award is represented by a small buffalo statue in Gilwell Park. The second went to the Unknown Scout who inspired William D. Boyce to form the Boy Scouts of America. In 1928, the World War I soldier buried in the Tomb of the Unknowns was awarded the Silver Buffalo for distinguished service to America's youth.

Six Medal of Honor recipients have received the Silver Buffalo: The Unknown Soldier of WWI 1928, Charles Lindbergh 1928, Richard Evelyn Byrd 1929, Theodore Roosevelt Jr. 1934, Eddie Rickenbacker 1944, and Douglas MacArthur 1963.

Three of the 28 Congressional Space Medal of Honor recipients have received the Silver Buffalo: John Glenn 1965, Neil Armstrong 1970, and Jim Lovell 1992.

Three Chief Justices of the Supreme Court have been awarded the Silver Buffalo: #10 William Howard Taft 1927, #11 Charles Evans Hughes 1944, and #15 Warren E. Burger 1988.

Fifteen Presidents of the United States have been awarded the Silver Buffalo: #27 William Howard Taft 1927, #30 Calvin Coolidge 1929, #31 Herbert Hoover 1930, #32 Franklin Delano Roosevelt 1930, #33 Harry Truman 1950, #34 Dwight D. Eisenhower 1946, #36 Lyndon B. Johnson 1964, #37 Richard Nixon 1971, #38 Gerald Ford 1975 (also a Distinguished Eagle Scout), #39 Jimmy Carter 1978, #40 Ronald Reagan 1982, #41 George H. W. Bush 1990, #42 Bill Clinton 1997, #43 George W. Bush 2002, and #44 Barack Obama 2013.

The Silver Buffalo has been presented to celebrities including Walt Disney 1946, Irving Berlin 1948, James Stewart 1958, Bob Hope 1959, Art Linkletter 1981, Burl Ives 1986, Charles M. Schulz 1988, Marian Anderson 1990, Zig Ziglar 2001, and Lee Greenwood 2002; Sports stars including Amos Alonzo Stagg 1935, Connie Mack 1938, Vince Lombardi 1969, Ernie Banks 1973, Hank Aaron 1984, Eddie G. Robinson 1986, John Wooden 1990, Yogi Berra 2003, Archie Manning 2007, and Jeff Gordon 2015.

Six father/son pairs have earned the Silver Buffalo, Mortimer L. Schiff 1926 and John M. Schiff 1943, John Randolph Donnell 1958 and John R. Donnell Jr. 1990, J. Willard Marriott 1980 and J.W. Marriott Jr. 1994, George H. W. Bush 1990 and George W. Bush 2002, R. Lawry Hunsaker 2004 and Russ Hunsaker 2013, and Gale F. Johnston 1952 and Fleet Johnston 2023.

Seven husband/wife pairs have earned the Silver Buffalo, Ronald Reagan 1982 and Nancy Reagan 1988, Donna Cunningham 2003 and Larry Cunningham 2009, Wayne M. Perry 2006 and Christine Perry 2016, Gail and Dale Coyne 2011, Edward Arnold 2011 and Jeanne Arnold 2013, George F. Francis, III 2001 and Elaine Smith Francis 2013, and Justin D. (Dan) McCarthy 2012 and Carol McCarthy 2017.

Eight Presidents of the Church of Jesus Christ of Latter-day Saints have been awarded the Silver Buffalo: #7 Heber J. Grant 1938, #8 George Albert Smith 1934, #9 David O. McKay 1953, #11 Harold B. Lee 1963, #12 Spencer W. Kimball 1984, #13 Ezra Taft Benson 1954, #15 Gordon B. Hinckley 1994, and #16 Thomas S. Monson 1978.

Four Chief Scout Executives, James E. West 1926, Elbert K. Fretwell 1938, Arthur A. Schuck 1950, Joseph Brunton 1973, and two Deputy Chief Scout Executives, George J. Fisher 1926, and Pliny Hunnicut Powers 1959, have been presented the award.

For fifty years the Silver Buffalo was awarded only to men until Elizabeth G. Knight and LaVern W. Parmley became the first women to receive the honor in 1976. As of 2026, 48 women have received the award.

As of 2026, there have been 901 individual recipients and three group recipients for a total of 904 distinct awards. The group recipients are the 2001 award to The Oak Ridge Boys, the 2011 award to Gail and Dale Coyne, and the 2022 award to the Survivors of Abuse in Scouting.

Within Camp Sandy Beach at Yawgoog Scout Reservation, a campsite has been named "Silver Buffalo" in recognition of all those who have earned the distinguished award.

== See also ==
- List of recipients of the Silver Buffalo Award
