= History of the Order of the Arrow =

- Current logo of the Order of the Arrow
- Previous Name: Wimachtendienk
- Founded: July 16, 1915

The Order of the Arrow (OA), previously known as Wimachtendienk Wingolauchsik Witahemui (WWW) is the Honor Society of Scouting America. It was started in 1915 as a camp fraternity and became an official program of Scouting America in 1948.

== Founding and development ==
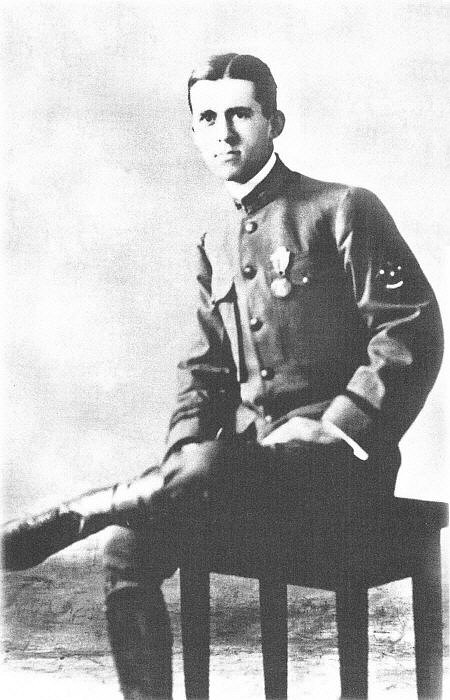
E. Urner Goodman (c. 1917), founder of the Order of the Arrow

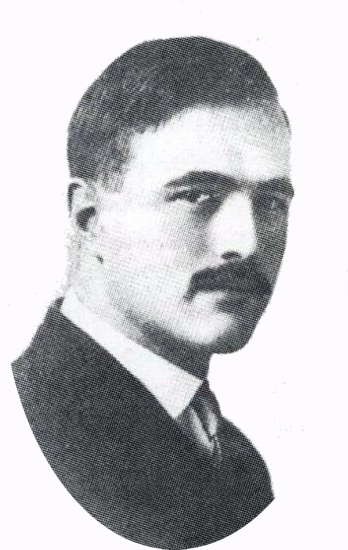
Carroll A. Edson in 1915

In 1915, E. Urner Goodman, a newly hired field executive for the Philadelphia Council, was assigned to serve as director of the council's summer camp at Treasure Island Scout Reservation on the Delaware River. He believed that the summer camp experience should do more than just teach proficiency in Scoutcraft skills; rather, the principles embodied in the Scout Oath and Scout Law should become realities in the lives of Scouts. Along with his assistant camp director, Carroll A. Edson, he started an experimental honor society to acknowledge those campers he felt best exemplified these qualities, calling the program, Wimachtendienk, or "Brotherhood" in one of the Lenape dialects. The full original name for the organization was Wimachtendienk Wingolauchsik Witahemui (Brotherhood of Those Who Serve Cheerfully). It is still referred to via the inclusion of the letters "W W W" on most lodge patches.

Goodman and Edson decided that a "camp fraternity" was the way to improve the summer camp experience and to encourage older Scouts to continue attending Scout summer camp. In developing this program they borrowed from the traditions and practices of several other organizations. Edward Cave's Boy's Camp Book (1914) was consulted for the concept of a camp society that would perpetuate camp traditions. Inspired by Ernest Thompson Seton's previous Woodcraft Indians program, American Indian motifs were used to make the organization interesting and appealing to youth. Other influences include the Brotherhood of Andrew and Phillip, a Presbyterian church youth group with which Goodman had been involved as a young man, and Freemasonry.

Goodman and Edson ultimately devised a program where troops chose, at the summer camp's conclusion, those boys from among their number who they felt best exemplified the ideals of Scouting. Those elected were acknowledged as having displayed, in the eyes of their fellow Scouts, a spirit of unselfish service and brotherhood. Edson and Goodman said they "based the OA's lore and ceremonies on the lore of the Lenni Lenape Indians who had occupied Treasure Island in earlier times" and based the group's structure "on a loose interpretation of Hiawatha and Last of the Mohicans", both popular works of fiction by Henry Wadsworth Longfellow and James Fenimore Cooper, respectively. The Scouts considered this move a success, and went on to repeat this pattern the following summer at Treasure Island. Those Scouts honored at Treasure Island in 1915 and 1916 would become members of what is now Unami Lodge.

In 1916, the levels of membership were Pledge, First Degree and Second Degree. Pledges were candidates who took part in the initiation ceremony similar to today's Ordeal Honor. The first degree was for candidates who completed the initiation during the October annual "member's only" meeting similar to the Brotherhood Honor today. By 1920, the term Pledge was dropped and the Degrees moved down to become First Degree, Second Degree and Third Degree.

== National organization ==
By 1921, Goodman had spoken to Scout leaders in surrounding states about their honor society, which resulted in multiple lodges being established by Scout councils in the northeastern United States.

=== First Grand Lodge Meeting ===
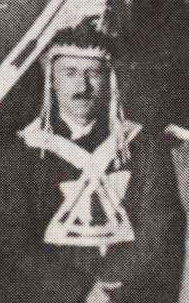
OA Leader Wearing the Triangle Vigil Sash in 1921

On October 7 and 8, 1921, the First Grand Lodge Meeting took place in Philadelphia and hosted by the Unami and Unalachtgo Lodges. The organization was ready to have a national structure. Inspired by the Freemasons, all the "known" lodges would become members of the Grand Lodge. Eight of the eleven known lodges. Edson was selected to chair this first meeting. Four committees were formed at this meeting including two to frame the Grand Lodge Constitution and re-write, provide further revisions of the ceremonies, devise insignia, and plan future development. At the end of the first day, the delegates gathered at Camp Biddle to hold a re-dedication ceremony. Officers were also elected with E. Urner Goodman becoming the Grand Chieftain (Eluwak Kittakima).

Dr. William Hinkle was part of the Committee on Ordeals and Ritual and was the primary person responsible for the re-writing of the ceremonies. According to the report of the committee, "meddlesome outsiders" had accessed to the Ritual in the Summer of 1920 at Treasure Island and therefore "it was decided to revise that both the ritual for the ordeals and for the different degrees". As a result of this report, consistent written versions of the First and Second Degree ceremonies were provided to the chartered Lodges. A Pre-Ordeal was introduced.

Changes were also brought to the characters of the First Degree and Second Degree:

- Medeu became Gegeyjumhet, the Supreme Chief of the Fire
- Medicine Man became Meteu
- Nischeneyit Sakima was introduced as the Senior Vice Chief
- Pow-wow became Kittakima, the Chief of the Fire

Sakima (Chief) and Nutiket (Guard/Guide) remained the same. A closing ceremony was added to the First Degree and the Second Degree's ceremony was re-written with the content of the ceremony remaining the same.

The name of the society was changed to Order of the Arrow. Committees were organized to formulate a constitution, refine ceremonial rituals, devise insignia, and plan future development.

The traditions and rituals of Freemasonry were a major source of inspiration for the Order of the Arrow in the first decade.

The terms "lodge" and "Grand Lodge," the earliest version of a national meeting, were borrowed from Freemasonry. Goodman joined the Robert A. Lamberton Lodge No. 487, Grand Lodge of Pennsylvania on March 5, 1918, only a few years after the first ceremonies of the Order of the Arrow took place and before the First Grand Lodge Meeting of 1921 that saw a formalization of the OA's structures and a rewrite of the ceremonies.

In the early 1930s, the Order of the Arrow agreed to change its vocabulary. As part of the agreement made by the OA National Executive Committee with Scouting America to become an official part of the Boy Scout program, the OA agreed to change certain terminology effective January 1, 1935 (although not disseminated to local lodges until April 23, 1935). Scouting America was concerned about the heavy reliance on Masonic fraternal terms in the Order. So the term “lodge” was replaced with the word “tribe”, and “Grand” was changed to “National”, the term “Degree” became “Honor”, and the term “Password” became “Admonition”. The term “Manitou”, referring to a deity, was eliminated from ceremonies, this being done to satisfy religious groups' concerns."

=== BSA's concerns about camp fraternities ===
In the early 1920s, many Scout executives were skeptical of what they called "secret camp fraternities". Less than a year after the First Grand Lodge Meeting took place, concerns regarding these fraternities officially made their way to BSA. Between September 12 and 19, 1922, the Second Biennial Conference of the Boy Scout Executives took place in Blue Ridge, North Carolina. The Commission on Camping met on the first day of the event discussed the topic as visible in their report. One of the Scout Executive, A.W. Beeny from Stamford, Connecticut made "a motion that camp fraternities be discouraged in connection with Boy Scout camps". The commission was divided on the issue.

Goodman argued against the motion:

We take our boys to camp every summer. They do not play games alone, do not put on stunt alone, where they are to build character and train for citizenship. If there is anything then that we can do as Scout leaders, using the Scout ideals as our great objective, of course, if there is anything by way of a camp activity which we can do to further the advancement of those ideals, certainly it seems to me we should not vote against such a procedure. On the other hand, if there be established in some camps organizations which are found to militate against the accomplishment of our ideals, then we should suppress them. I think it is altogether impossible in a blanket resolution to say that camp organizations or societies or fraternities should be taboo. It seems to me it is rather a question of the organization under consideration.

— E. Urner Goodman, Official Report of the National Training Conference of Scout Executives of the Boy Scouts of America vol.2, pages 161-162, September 12, 1922

In spite of these concerns, the WWW was welcomed with two other Camp Fraternities to be "Official Experiments" of the Boy Scouts of America. The other two groups were the Tribe of Gimogash and Ku-Ni-Eh who were active in as many if not more councils than the WWW. However, the WWW was only opened to Scouts and its leadership was composed only of professional Scouters. This appears to have been essential to the Order of the Arrow becoming an official program of the Boy Scouts of America later on.

== Becoming an official BSA program ==
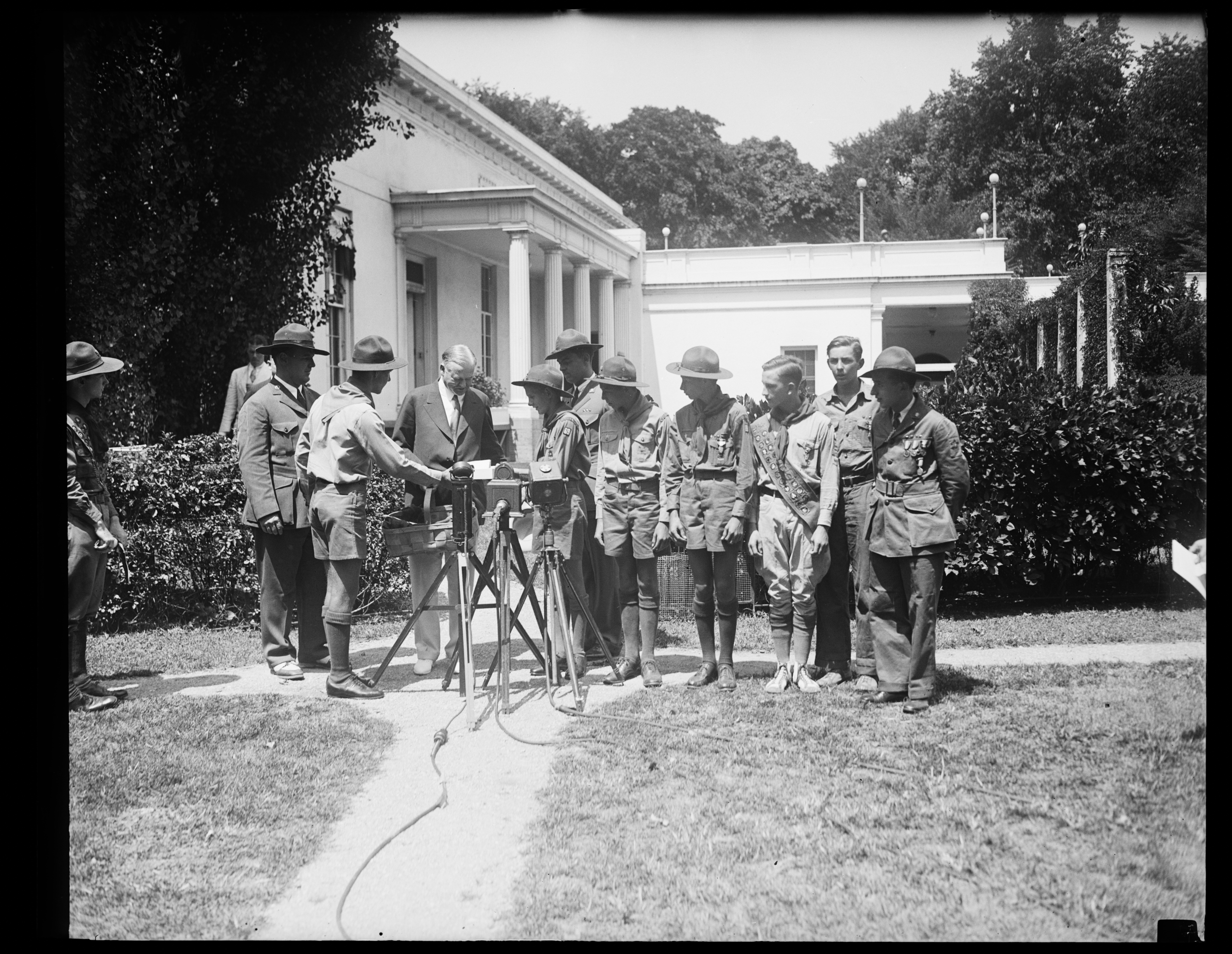
President Hoover with scouts outside the White House in 1932

By 1929, the Boy Scouts of America had 1,181,227 scouts and scouters as members. It had proven itself to the Americans public and received the support of many in Congress and the President (President Hoover was Honorary President of BSA). It had also received the support of churches. The following Protestant Churches supported the movement: the Northern Baptist Convention, the United Lutheran Church in America and the Presbyterian Church (USA) in 1918, The Congregational Churches and Methodist Church in 1919 and the Southern Baptist Convention in 1923. Support from the Catholic Church started in 1917, when several archbishops endorsed Scouting. Jewish support was slow but also increased over the years. The Church of Jesus Christ of Latter-day Saints (Mormons) were among the first to support the new Scouting organization.

According to the 1929 Annual Report of the Boy Scouts of America: "[..]49.4% of the scout troops in America were affiliated with churches as parent institutions at the time. National and local church organizations of all faiths have given liberal support to the extension of scouting and the promotion of a more effective correlation of the scout program with the church program."

Throughout the 1930s, the Order of the Arrow worked diligently to remove the offending terminology from its early years that could offend religious groups (specifically Christian churches) and replace it with words associated with Native American lore instead. This was an essential step on the path to become an official program of the Boy Scouts of America who wished to maintain its close relationship with churches.

I, (your name), do hereby promise on my honor as a Scout, that I will always and faithfully preserve unbroken the secret rites, mysteries, signs and symbols of the Order of the WIMACHTENDIENK WINGOLAUCHSIK, WITAHEMUI, which I have now received or may be taught at any future time. I will always regard the bonds of brotherhood in this Order as sacred and binding, and will seek to preserve a cheerful spirit even in the midst of irksome tasks and weighty responsibilities, and will endeavor, so far as in my power lies, to be unselfish in service and devotion to the welfare of others. I will attend, so far as I am able, all regular and special meetings of the Order and do what I can to promote interest in them.

— 1921 Obligation (officially disclosed by the Order of the Arrow on their website) with the words changed in 1931 in bold.

Every part of the program was reviewed including the obligation. An updated version of the 1921 Ordeal was issued in 1931. The most significant word change was as sacred and binding switched to as binding to satisfy religious groups objecting to sacred rituals performed by their members. The Ordeal Ceremony characters went from six to four ceremonialists. It also saw the introduction of Allowat Sakima and Kitchkinet while Meteu and Nutiket remained. A new booklet containing the ceremony was entitled Ritual for the Ordeal (first) Degree and had the words "Carefully Safeguard This Ritual" on the cover.

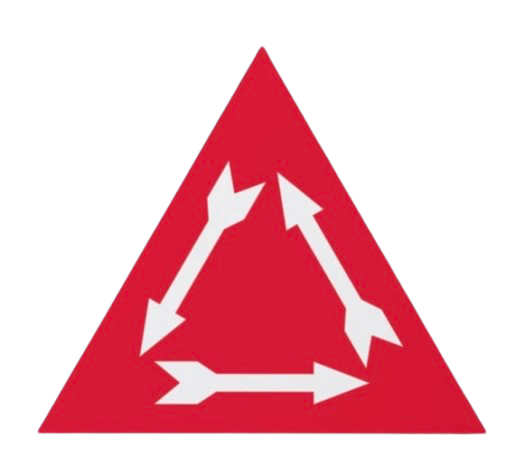
The Vigil Honor triangle

At the 1931 Grand Lodge Meeting, a motion was unanimously passed by the delegates to change the Third Degree (now the Vigil Honor) Symbol from a triangle to an arrowhead with an arrow superimposed on it with the totem of the local lodge on top. That totem does not appear to have ever been used or produced. The decision was reversed at the next meeting in 1933. This would become the basis of the design of the Distinguished Service Award nine years later.

In 1933, the National Council (BSA) finished a systematic analysis of various programs like the Order of the Arrow and concluded that such programs enhanced scouting. The Order of the Arrow had been assured that it would become an official program of the organization but some issues related to structures, Arrowmen who had aged out of the program, and adjustments of the vocabulary where needed. The Grand Lodge issued a document in August 1933 titled A Statement of Principles Applying in the Case of National Approval of the Order of the Arrow guided the transition. One section listed the tasks of a committee to review the Rituals of the Order to remove:

- "Any words or phrases, which may cause offense to religious bodies"
- "Any performance or expressions, which may be interpreted as acts of religious worship"
- "Any employment of the element of secrecy as in obligation, which may prove inconsistent with the policies of Scouting."

This process continued until early 1935 and many changes took place:

- Meteu (the Medicine Man)'s prayers were completely rewritten
- Gitchee Manitou, a reference to a deity, was dropped from all ceremonies
- The Password was replaced with Admonition

Before 1933, the words altar and sacred had already been replaced and the word Fraternity replaced with Brotherhood. It is also around that time that Degree was replaced with Honor.

The vocabulary used in the Order went through a revision at the request of BSA "to avoid confusion with other usages of these same terms" and to avoid being labeled a Masonic organization. This process was, in essence, the removal of all terminology common to Freemasonry while keeping the program itself unchanged to make it acceptable to the religious groups.

On August 23, 1933, President Franklin D. Roosevelt was inducted in the Order of the Arrow. He is the first and only President of the United States be inducted. This took place at Camp Man of Ten Mile River Scout Camp and was conducted by the Suanhacky Lodge. President Roosevelt was an important advocate of Scouting in the early years of the Boy Scouts of America.

Finally, on June 1, 1934, the Order of the Arrow along with several other new programs was officially approved the Order of the Arrow to be used nationally. The National Council would not take over the Order but incrementally would charter the Grand Lodge and its structure. The change took effect on January 1, 1935.

The word "secret" in the Ordeal was dropped in 1935 to read "I will always and faithfully preserve unbroken the rites, mysteries, signs and symbols of the Order of the Arrow".

In 1936, five new pamphlets containing all the changed were printed including:

- A red cover for the Ordeal
- A green cover for the Brotherhood
- A blue cover for the Vigil Honor (printed in 1940)
- Brown ink was used for the Local Lodge Manual cover
- Black ink was used for the Constitution and By-Law cover

One of the terms that was changed in the process was Lodge. It was replaced by the term Tribe. However, this did not last long and in March 1936, after only 14 months, BSA reverted to using the world Lodge. The official reason given is that term was also used in the Lone Scouts of America which had merged with BSA on June 16, 1924, and was by then officially part of BSA. As a result, all the local tribes reverted to their old Lodge names. The Grand Lodge had become the National Tribe and was now the National Lodge. The National Lodge Chief Thomas Cairns said at the time that "many of us seem happy to have again the use of the word 'lodge'". The Ceremony pamphlet was redone to incorporate that and was approved on January 31, 1936.

The Ordeal Honor and Brotherhood remained unchanged until 1948.

== Official program of the BSA ==
By 1948, about two-thirds of the BSA's councils had established OA lodges. That year, it was announced at the 1948 NOAC that the Order of the Arrow was integrated as an official part of the Scouting program. This change was the final step to a long process that had started in 1921. This also required that the leadership positions in lodges, and later area and region be transferred to youth leaders with adult advisers as in the rest of Boy Scouts of America. It also simplified the management of the Order and servicing the local lodges as it leveraged the National Supply of BSA.

At the same time, the National Executive Committee that had governed the OA disbanded and was replaced by the National Committee on Order of the Arrow who now reported to the Director of Camping at BSA.

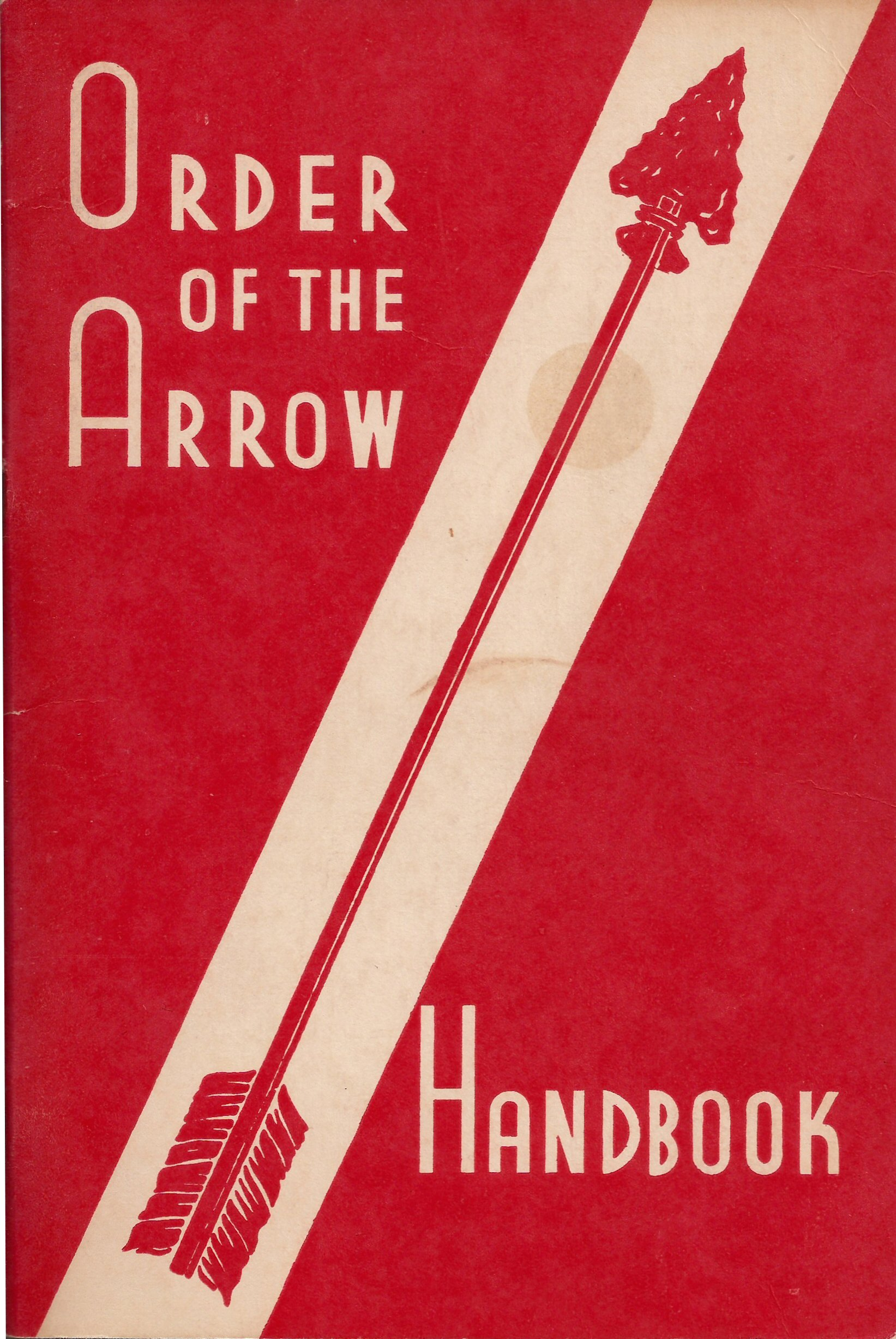
1950 OA Handbook

That same year, it was determined that as part of the Boy Scouts of America, an Order of the Arrow Handbook was needed. J. Rucker Newbery, the National Lodge Treasurer was tasked with the responsibility to edit this first edition. It contained primarily:

- the Constitution and the By-Laws pamphlet
- the Local Lodge Manual pamphlet
- the Indian Ritual Costumes pamphlet
- the Selection of Candidates and the Ordeal pamphlet
- the "Dramatization of the Legend of the Lenni Lenape" by the Tomkita Chara Lodge
- the song of the Order

In 1950, the Second National Jamboree was held at Valley Forge, PA from June 27 to July 6. This was the first time that the OA Service Troop (today's Service Corps).

In 1956, the "Blood-rite" was removed from the Brotherhood Ceremony. The National OA Committee had consulted with medical advisors and determined that "it was no longer safe to draw and exchange blood between two people. It was officially replaced by a symbolic draw of blood. However, the change was slow to take place in the lodges and this practice was reported to have continued well into the 1960s. The script for the ceremony in 1956 was changed from "...draw drops of blood..." to "...symbolically draw 'blood' so that you may mingle your 'blood'..."

== Unchanged ceremony, different booklets ==
The Order of the Arrow is a thing of the spirit rather than of mechanics. Organization, operational procedure, and paraphernalia are necessary in any large and growing movement, but they are not what count in the end. The things of the spirit count -
Brotherhood - in a day when there is too much hatred at home and abroad.
Cheerfulness - in a day when the pessimists have the floor.
Service - in a day when millions are interested only in getting or grasping rather than giving.
These are of the spirit, blessed of God, the great Divine spirit.

— E. Urner Goodman - 1961 OA Handbook

March 1968, saw the arrival of the Ordeal Ceremony booklet with a new cover. The red ink color code disappeared and a new copyright was used. The Pre-Ordeal and Ordeal rituals did not change. However a section title "Conducting of the Election", "Suggested Election Ceremony" and "Training Ceremonial Teams" were added. New covers were produced for 1973, 1977 and 1979 but the content remained the same.

In 1981, a new cover was produced and the content of the "Manual for the Ordeal" saw its format and contents changed. It became a "how to" manual with every detail of the administration of the Ordeal mapped out, from the Call Out to the Investiture. Changes also were implemented in the new Pre-Ordeal and symbols used that each principal ceremonialist had to explain and use in the candidate's preparation. 1988 saw a new cover but the content remained the same.

The ceremony of the Ordeal was split in two booklets in 1990. The "Administration Guide for the Ordeal" contained the information to administer the Ordeal while the "Ceremony for the Ordeal" contained the actual Pre-Ordeal and Ordeal rituals. Despite this split, the content of the two was essentially the 1981 copyrighted rituals using the 1988 cover. These booklets remained in use until 1999 when the two were brought back together in one 30-page ceremony book 8.5x11 inches in size. This was the last change to the Ordeal.

== 21st century ==
Over the century since the Order of the Arrow's founding, more than one million Scouts and Scouters have worn the OA sash on their uniforms, denoting membership in the Brotherhood. The four stated purposes of the Order of the Arrow are: "(1) Recognize those who best exemplify the Scout Oath and Law in their daily lives and through that recognition cause others to conduct themselves in a way that warrants similar recognition; (2) Promote camping, responsible outdoor adventure, and environmental stewardship as essential components of every Scout's experience, in the unit, year-round, and in summer camp; (3) Develop leaders with the willingness, character, spirit and ability to advance the activities of their units, our Brotherhood, Scouting, and ultimately our nation; and (4) Crystallize the Scout habit of helpfulness into a life purpose of leadership in cheerful service to others.

In a new program of national service conducted from June through August 2008, the OA offered ArrowCorps^{5} to both youth and adult Arrowmen. Described as "one of the largest conservation efforts in Scouting's history" by the Boy Scouts of America, approximately 3,500 Arrowmen converged on five national forests to work on various conservation projects such as building new trails and helping preserve nearly extinct species, as well as removing invasive species, in cooperation with the U.S. Forest Service. The five national forests are: Mark Twain National Forest, Manti-La Sal National Forest, George Washington and Jefferson National Forests, Shasta-Trinity National Forest and Bridger-Teton National Forest.

With the introduction of the Scouts BSA program on February 1, 2019, unit elections are now permitted in Scouts BSA, Venturing and Sea Scouting units.
