= National Order of the Arrow Conference =

Order of the Arrow event

- Owner: Order of the Arrow
- Location: University of Illinois at Urbana-Champaign (2027)
- Founded: 1948
- Attendees: 6,500 (2024)

The National Order of the Arrow Conference (NOAC) is a multi-day event where Order of the Arrow delegates from all lodges gather for training and activities. NOAC usually takes place on a university campus in the United States. NOACs are held every two years, with exceptions made to align the event with significant scouting anniversaries.

== History ==
The first NOAC was held in 1948 at Indiana University Bloomington. They have occurred every two years since, with a few exceptions. NOAC 2008 was moved to 2009 in order for NOAC 2014 to align with the OA’s centennial in 2015. Similarly, deferrals from 1960 to 1961 and from 1985 to 1986 aligned the schedule with the OA's 50th and 75th anniversaries in 1965 and 1990, respectively. The 2020 conference also had to be delayed to 2022 due to COVID-19, with Arrowmen up to age 23 allowed to attend instead of 21.

The organization’s Distinguished Service Award is presented at NOAC.

== Previous National Events ==
=== Grand Lodge Meeting ===
In 1927, the decision was made to hold regional meetings in alternate years to national Grand Lodge Meetings. The Grand Lodge Meeting was delayed from 1935 to 1936 to avoid a conflict with the planned 1935 National Jamboree.^{[a]} In 1936, the event name was changed to National Lodge Meeting.

== Table of National OA Events ==
Year	Event	Number	Location	Theme	Dates	Attendees	Refs
1921	Grand Lodge Meeting	1st	Philadelphia, Pennsylvania; Hosted by Unami Lodge 1 and Unalactigo Lodge 8		October 7, 1921		^{[a]}^{[b]}
1922	Grand Lodge Meeting	2nd	Camp Indiandale, Reading, Pennsylvania; Hosted by Minsi Lodge 5		October 6, 1922 – October 7, 1922		^{[a]}^{[b]}
1923	Grand Lodge Meeting	3rd	Camp Linstead, Severna Park, Maryland, Baltimore Area Council; Hosted by Nentico Lodge 12		October 12, 1923 – October 13, 1923		^{[a]}^{[b]}
1924	Grand Lodge Meeting	4th	Kanohwanke Scout Reservation, Camp Ranachqua Tuxedo Park, New York		October 31, 1924 – November 1, 1924		^{[a]}^{[b]}
1925	Grand Lodge Meeting	5th	Treasure Island Scout Reservation, New Jersey; Hosted by Unami Lodge 1		October 16, 1925 – October 17, 1925		^{[a]}^{[b]}
1926	Grand Lodge Meeting	6th	Camp Indiandale, Reading, Pennsylvania; Hosted by Minsi Lodge 5		October 29, 1926 – October 30, 1926		^{[a]}^{[b]}
1927	Grand Lodge Meeting	7th	Camp Ranachqua, Kanohwahke Lake, Tuxedo, New York Hosted by Ranachqua Lodge 4		October 14, 1927 – October 15, 1927		^{[a]}^{[b]}
1929	Grand Lodge Meeting	8th	Stephen Girard Hotel, Philadelphia, Pennsylvania; Hosted by Unami Lodge 1		November 29, 1929 – December 1, 1929		^{[a]}^{[b]}
1931	Grand Lodge Meeting	9th	Camp Rotary, Pilot Knob, Lake George, New York; Hosted by Sisilija Lodge 19		September 11, 1931 – September 13, 1931		^{[a]}^{[b]}
1933	Grand Lodge Meeting	10th	Owasippe Scout Camp, Muskegon, Michigan; Hosted by Owasippe Lodge 7		September 7, 1933 – September 10, 1933		^{[a]}^{[b]}
1936	National Lodge Meeting	11th	Treasure Island Scout Reservation, New Jersey; Hosted by Unami Lodge 1		September 5, 1936 – September 7, 1936		^{[a]}^{[b]}
1938	National Lodge Meeting	12th	Irondale Scout Reservation, Irondale, Missouri; Hosted by Shawnee Lodge 51		September 3, 1938 – September 5, 1938		^{[a]}^{[b]}
1940	National Lodge Meeting	13th	Camp Twin Echo, Ligonier, Pennsylvania; Hosted by Anicus Lodge 67		August 31, 1940 – September 2, 1940		^{[a]}^{[b]}
1942	National Lodge Meeting	Canceled	University of North Carolina, Chapel Hill		September 4, 1942 – September 6, 1942	Canceled due to WWII	^{[a]}
1946	National Lodge Meeting	14th	Chanute Field, Illinois		August 27, 1946 – August 29, 1946	948	^{[a]}^{[b]}
1948	National Lodge Meeting / NOAC	15th/1st	Indiana University		September 1, 1948 – September 3, 1948	1000	^{[c]}
1950	NOAC	2nd	Indiana University	35th Anniversary	August 29, 1950 – August 31, 1950	1000	^{[c]}^{[d]}
1952	NOAC	3rd	Miami University	37th Anniversary	August 29, 1952 – August 31, 1952	2200	^{[c]}^{[d]}
1954	NOAC	4th	University of Wyoming	39th Anniversary - The OA Strengthens the Unit and Council Camping Programs	August 28, 1954 – August 30, 1954	1300	^{[c]}^{[d]}
1956	NOAC	5th	Indiana University	Service for God and Country	August 27, 1956 – August 30, 1956	2201	^{[c]}
1958	NOAC	6th	University of Kansas	Brothers in Service – Leaders in Camping	August 25, 1958 – August 28, 1958	2368	^{[c]}
1961	NOAC	7th	Indiana University	Weld Tightly Every Link – Brotherhood – Cheerfulness – Service – Camping	August 21, 1961 – August 24, 1961	2800	^{[c]}^{[d]}
1963	NOAC	8th	University of Illinois Urbana-Champaign	Catch the Higher Vision	August 20, 1963 – August 23, 1963	3105	^{[c]}^{[d]}
1965	NOAC	9th	Indiana University	Mindful of our Traditions	August 27, 1965 – August 31, 1965	4200	^{[c]}^{[d]}
1967	NOAC	10th	University of Nebraska	With Hearts and Wills United	August 28, 1967 – September 1, 1967	4158	^{[c]}^{[d]}
1969	NOAC	11th	Indiana University	Pathways to Service	August 23, 1969 – August 26, 1969	4421	^{[c]}
1971	NOAC	12th	University of Illinois Urbana-Champaign	Aim High Serve All	August 24, 1971 – August 28, 1971	5200	^{[c]}^{[d]}
1973	NOAC	13th	University of California, Santa Barbara	New Horizons of Service	August 21, 1973 – August 23, 1973	4400	^{[c]}^{[d]}
1974	National Indian Seminar		Philmont Scout Ranch		July 27, 1974 – August 11, 1974		
1975	NOAC	14th	Miami University	Foundations for the Future	August 18, 1975 – August 22, 1975	4200	^{[c]}^{[d]}
1976	National Indian Seminar	Canceled	John Zink Scout Ranch, Skiatook, Oklahoma		July 15, 1976 – July 27, 1976		
1977	NOAC	15th	University of Tennessee	A Thing of the Spirit	August 23, 1977 – August 27, 1977	3900	^{[c]}^{[d]}
1978	National Indian Seminar		Camp George Thomas, Apache, Oklahoma		August 13, 1978 – August 19, 1978		
1979	NOAC	16th	Colorado State University	See the Need, Meet the Challenge	August 13, 1979 – August 19, 1979	4351	^{[c]}^{[d]}
1980	National Indian Seminar		Beaumont Scout Reservation St. Louis, Missouri		August 9, 1980 – August 16, 1980		
1981	NOAC	17th	University of Texas at Austin	First a Spark, Now a Flame	August 10, 1981 – August 14, 1981	3200	^{[c]}^{[d]}
1982	National Indian Seminar		Peaceful Valley Scout Ranch, Elbert, Colorado		July 31, 1982 – August 7, 1982		
1983	NOAC	18th	Rutgers University	Those Who Chose You Need You	August 15, 1983 – August 19, 1983	3328	^{[c]}^{[d]}
1984	National Indian Seminar		Camp Bud Schiele, Rutherfordton, North Carolina; Hosted by Eswau Huppeday Lodge 560		August 5, 1984 – August 11, 1984		
1984	National Indian Seminar		Camp Wisdom, Duncanville, Texas		August 12, 1984 – August 18, 1984		
1984	National Indian Seminar		Camp Brinkley, Monroe, Washington		August 12, 1984 – August 18, 1984		
1985	Trek		Philmont Scout Ranch	Ponder That Which Is Our Purpose	August 11, 1985 – August 20, 1985	1182	^{[c]}
1986	NOAC	19th	Central Michigan University	Kindle the Flame From Within	August 11, 1986 – August 15, 1986	3700	^{[c]}^{[d]}
1987	National Pow Wow/ National Indian Seminar		Northwest Community College	Events: Indian Seminar/Shows Seminar/Ceremonies Seminar	August 2, 1987 – August 8, 1987	500	^{[c]}
1988	NOAC	20th	Colorado State University	Inspired to Lead, Dedicated to Serve	August 14, 1988 – August 18, 1988	4100	^{[c]}^{[d]}
1989	Trek		Philmont Scout Ranch	These High Places Are Within You	August 13, 1989–August 21, 1989	880	^{[c]}
1990	NOAC	21st	Indiana University	Seek the Knowledge, Share the Spirit (75th Anniversary)	August 12, 1990 – August 16, 1990	6900	^{[d]}
1991	Task Forces		Focus '91	Year of the Lodge	1991	N/A	^{[c]}
1992	NOAC	22nd	University of Tennessee	Many Fires, One Great Light	August 9, 1992 – August 13, 1992	6800	^{[c]}^{[d]}
1993	Jamboree Service		Fort A.P. Hill, Virginia	Contributions: OA Service Corps, OA Rendezvous	August 4, 1993 – August 10, 1993	222	^{[c]}
1994	NOAC	23rd	Purdue University	A Journey for One, An Adventure for Many	July 31, 1994 – August 4, 1994	6012	^{[c]}^{[d]}
1995	Retreat		Philmont Training Center	Year of Service Events: Indian Seminar/Ceremonies/Shows & OA Activities	1995	400	^{[c]}
1996	NOAC	24th	Indiana University	See the Dream, Live the Adventure	August 11, 1996 – August 15, 1996	6265	^{[c]}^{[d]}
1997	Jamboree Service		Fort A.P. Hill, Virginia	Contributions: OA Service Corps, American Indian Village, TOAP, Odyssey of the Law	July 28, 1997 – August 5, 1997	413	^{[c]}
1998	NOAC	25th	Iowa State University	Memories of the Past, A Vision for the Future	August 2, 1998 – August 6, 1998	7043	^{[c]}
1999	Leadership Summit		Colorado State University	Supporting Scouting in the 21st Century	July 31, 1999 – August 3, 1999	1127	^{[c]}
2000	NOAC	26th	University of Tennessee	Bound in Brotherhood, Led By the Spirit	July 29, 2000 – August 3, 2000	6632	^{[c]}
2001	Jamboree Services		Fort A.P. Hill, Virginia	Contributions: OA Service Corps, American Indian Village, TOAP, Scoutopia	July 23, 2001 – August 1, 2001	461	^{[c]}
2002	NOAC	27th	Indiana University	Test Yourself, and So Discover	July 27, 2002 – August 1, 2002	6939	^{[c]}
2003	Indian Summer		Ridgecrest Conference Center, Ridgecrest, North Carolina		August 2, 2003 – August 7, 2003	908	^{[c]}
2004	NOAC	28th	Iowa State University	Chosen to serve, Inspired to lead	July 31, 2004 – August 5, 2004	6504	^{[c]}
2005	Jamboree Services		Fort A.P. Hill, Virginia	Contributions: OA Service Corps, American Indian Village, TOAP, Twelve Cubed	July 25, 2005 – August 3, 2005	453	^{[c]}
2006	NOAC	29th	Michigan State University	The Legend Lives On	July 29, 2006 – August 3, 2006	8003	^{[c]}
2007	NCLS		Indiana University	Building the Path to Servant Leadership	July 28, 2007 – August 1, 2007	1292	^{[c]}
2008	Arrow Corps		Mark Twain National Forest		June 7, 2008 – June 14, 2008		^{[c]}
2008	Arrow Corps		Manti-La Sal National Forest		June 14, 2008 – June 21, 2008		^{[c]}
2008	Arrow Corps		George Washington and Jefferson National Forests		June 21, 2008 – June 28, 2008		^{[c]}
2008	Arrow Corps		Shasta-Trinity National Forest		July 12, 2008 – July 19, 2008		^{[c]}
2008	Arrow Corps		Bridger-Teton National Forest		July 26, 2008 – August 2, 2008		^{[c]}
2009	NOAC	30th	Indiana University	The Power of One	August 1, 2009 – August 6, 2009		
2010	Jamboree Services		Fort A.P. Hill, Virginia	Contributions: OA Service Corps, American Indian Village, The Mysterium Compass	July 26, 2010 – August 4, 2010		
2011	SummitCorps: The New River Experience		New River Gorge National River	The New River Experience	July 3, 2011 – July 30, 2011 (4 weeklong sessions)		
2011	Indian Summer		Ridgecrest Conference Center, Ridgecrest, North Carolina		August 1, 2011 – August 6, 2011		Indian Summer
2012	NOAC	31st	Michigan State University	United, We Leave a Legacy	July 30, 2012 – August 4, 2012		
2013	Jamboree Services		The Summit: Bechtel Family National Scout Reserve, West Virginia		July 15, 2013 – July 24, 2013		
2015	NOAC	32nd	Michigan State University	It Starts With Us	August 3, 2015 – August 8, 2015	14,716	
2016	PRISM		The Summit: Bechtel Family National Scout Reserve, West Virginia		June 19, 2016 – July 16, 2016		
2016	NEXT: A New Century		Indiana University		July 30, 2016 – August 3, 2016		
2017	Wachipi		Philmont Scout Ranch		June 6, 2017 – June 10, 2017		
2017	Jamboree Services		The Summit, West Virginia	Operation Arrow	July 15, 2017 – July 29, 2017		
2017	OA Hackathon		Folsom, CA		October 6, 2017 – October 8, 2017		
2018	NOAC	33rd	Indiana University	Decide Your Destiny	July 30, 2018 – August 4, 2018		
2019	National Scouting Historian Summit		Philmont Scout Ranch		June 9, 2019 – June 15, 2019		
2019	Thrive: A National Webinar, A Local Commitment		Webinar	Focus 19	October 19		
2020	NOAC	Canceled	Michigan State University	Step Up, Step Forward	August 3, 2020 – August 8, 2020	Canceled due to COVID-19 pandemic	
2020	Momentum	Canceled	The Summit, West Virginia		August 3, 2020 – August 8, 2020	Canceled due to COVID-19 pandemic	
2020	Momentum: Launch		Online event from The Summit, West Virginia		August 4, 2020 – August 6, 2020		
2020	Momentum: Spark		Online event from North Carolina and Connecticut		November 6, 2020 – November 7, 2020		
2021	Momentum: Discover		Online event from Connecticut and four council camps located nationwide		April 23, 2021 – April 25, 2021		
2021	National Council of Chiefs		Philmont Scout Ranch	Our World is Changing and So Must We ^{[e]}	August 1, 2021 – August 5, 2021		
2022	NOAC	34th	University of Tennessee	Tomorrow Begins Today	July 25, 2022 – July 30, 2022		
2023	Operation Arrow		The Summit, West Virginia				
2024	NOAC	35th	University of Colorado, Boulder	Seek New Heights	July 29, 2024 – August 3, 2024	7,217	
2025	National Council of Chiefs (NCOC)		Philmont Scout Ranch		July 21, 2025 – July 26, 2025		
2026	Operation Arrow		The Summit, West Virginia		July 22, 2026 – July 31, 2026		
2027	NOAC	36th	University of Illinois Urbana-Champaign	Our Time	July 26, 2027 – July 31, 2027		
2028	National Service Project		TBD		TBD		

- NCLS = National Conservation and Leadership Summit
- TOAP = The Outdoor Adventure Place

== See also ==
- National Scout jamboree
- Order of the Arrow
- List of Order of the Arrow Distinguished Service Award recipients
- Scouting America
