= Unami =

Unami may refer to:

- Unami people, one of the three main divisions of the Lenape Nation
- Unami language, a Delaware language within the Algonquian language family
- Unami Creek, a tributary of Perkiomen Creek in Pennsylvania
- Unami Lodge, a Boy Scouts of America lodge in Pennsylvania
- United Nations Assistance Mission for Iraq, UNAMI
- Unami Middle School in the Central Bucks School District, Pennsylvania

== See also ==
- Umami, one of the five basic tastes
- Unani, Perso-Arabic traditional medicine
