= Musser Scout Reservation =

Boy scout camp in Pennsylvania, United States

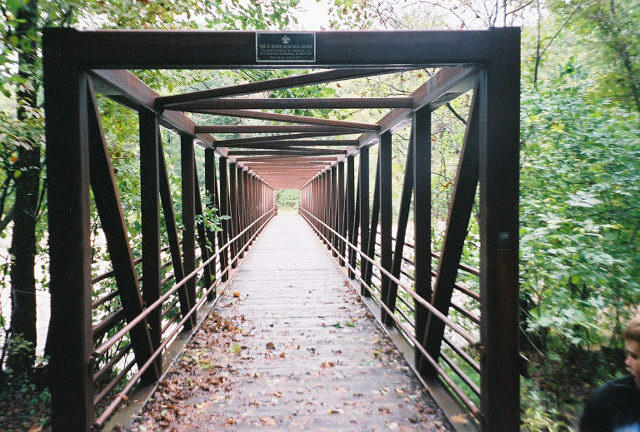
- Camp Hart Bridge traversing Unami Creek
- Owner: Cradle of Liberty Council
- Location: Marlborough Township, Pennsylvania
- Country: United States
- Coordinates: 40.3666°N 75.4317°W
- Website; Montgomery County Lands Trust & Musser Scout Reservation

Musser Scout Reservation is a Boy Scouts of America camp located along the Unami Creek on over 1,400 acres (6 km^{2}) of Marlborough Township, Pennsylvania. The Reservation is made up of three distinct camps: Camp Delmont, Camp Hart, and Camp Garrison. The reservation is part of the largest contiguous forest in Southeastern Pennsylvania. The camp is owned by the Cradle of Liberty Council.

The Cradle of Liberty Council, Natural Lands, Montgomery County Lands Trust, and Montgomery County signed a perpetual conservation easement permanently protecting over 1,200 acres (5 km^{2}) of the Musser Scout Reservation.

== History ==
Prior to 1996, the Philadelphia Council owned and operated Camp Hart, while the Valley Forge Council owned and operated Camp Delmont. Subsequent to the merger of these councils in 1996, these adjacent camps joined to create a new reservation.

Initially, this merged Scout camp was called "Delmont-Hart Scout Reservation". Later, the camps were renamed under "Musser Scout Reservation", to honor the late son of Pete Musser, a financial contributor who had a son that enjoyed camping there as a scout.

== Camps ==
=== Camp Delmont ===
Camp Delmont was named after the two counties that made up the original Delmont Council (DELaware and MONTgomery Counties Council, later known as The Valley Forge Council). For many years, Delmont consisted of two camps: Camp Cedar, which focused on one-week camping, and Camp Pioneer, which focused on two-week camping. As such, Delmont was a "Scout Reservation," since it included more than one camp. In later years, as Valley Forge Council focused summer camp on Resica Falls Scout Reservation, Camp Cedar was used for residential Webelos summer camp and Camp Pioneer was allowed to return to nature. Summer Camp was first held there in 1916.

As part of the Cradle of Liberty Council's contribution to the Scouting BSA victims support settlement, Camp Delmont is currently expected to be contributed as part of the total $6.8 million settlement. This does not include Camp Hart or Camp Garrison. So far this is non-binding, however the council's Executive Board unanimously approved the council's participation in the proposed settlement. (Email from Daniel Templar, Scout Executive of Cradle of Liberty Council, August 23, 2021) This is part of the greater Scouting BSA tentative settlement

As of 2025, Camp Delmont is no longer used for Scouting activities, with the final event held there being Unami Lodge, One's Brotherhood Blitz in November of 2024.

=== Camp Hart ===
Hart Scout Reservation was first opened in 1930, and has been in continuous operation since the first summer of operation. The property was provided in an endowment by Dr. Charles D. Hart, and he is honored in the titling of the Camp.

There are two distinct areas of Camp Hart divided by the Unami Creek. The western portion of the camp currently hosts Cradle of Liberty Council Leader training programs, and acts of the focal site of the council Cub Adventures summer resident camp for Cub Scouts and Webelos.

=== Camp Garrison ===
Camp Garrison was named after Walter R. Garrison, a major contributor to the building of the camp. The camp opened in 2000 and operates the Cub World summer program entirely devoted to the Cub Scouting program. There were four themed encampments: Fort Akela, Safeguard Castle, U.S.S. Cradle of Liberty, and the Native American Village; however, the Native American Village was taken out of commission.

== See also ==
- Scouting in Pennsylvania
