= E. Urner Goodman =

Founder of the Order of the Arrow

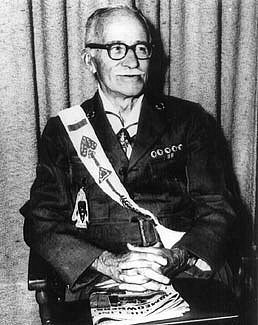
- Born: May 15, 1891; Philadelphia, Pennsylvania
- Died: March 13, 1980 (aged 88); New York City
- Resting place: Penney Farms, Florida
- Occupation: Professional Scouter
- Spouse: Louise Wynkoop Waygood
- Children: 3

Awards and honors

Silver Buffalo Award
OA Distinguished Service Award
OA Vigil Honor
Honorary Doctorate in Humanics
Honorary Chief of the Blackfoot Indians
Honorary Alpha Phi Omega brother

Edward Urner Goodman (May 15, 1891 – March 13, 1980) was an influential leader in the Boy Scouts of America (BSA) movement for much of the twentieth century. Goodman was the national program director from 1931 until 1951, during the organization's formative years of significant growth when the Cub Scouting and Exploring programs were established. He developed the BSA's national training center in the early 1930s and was responsible for publication of the widely read Boy Scout Handbook and other Scouting books, writing the Leaders Handbook used by Scout leaders in the United States during the 1930s and 1940s. In the 1950s, Goodman was executive director of Men's Work for the National Council of Churches in New York City and active in church work.

Goodman is best remembered today for having created the Order of the Arrow (OA). As of 2007, the Order of the Arrow has more than 183,000 members.

== Early years and marriage ==
Goodman was born and raised in Philadelphia, Pennsylvania, where his father, George, was a printer and real estate agent. His mother, Ella, died of typhoid fever in early 1895 when Goodman was just three years old. He attended Central High School, graduating in 1909. He enjoyed writing and began keeping a detailed journal of daily activities during his senior year of high school, expressing his aspirations for the future along with occasional doubts. With several classmates, he began a literary club and published a newsletter, The Inkstand. He also showed interest in music, playing the piano and violin, and composed a song for his high school senior class. When it was not selected by the class officers, he wrote in his journal of his disappointment.

Goodman also took an early interest in church activities as a youth, participating in a boys' brotherhood group and Sunday school and becoming a member of Tioga Presbyterian Church at age 14, an event he described as "the most important step I ever took or ever will take in my life." Just barely out of his teens, Goodman became a popular and highly respected Sunday school teacher and led the Philadelphia chapter of a young men's group called the Brotherhood of Andrew and Philip.

Aspiring to a career in education, Goodman enrolled in the Philadelphia School of Pedagogy in 1911. He was selected to be the commencement speaker at his graduation in 1913 and his address was entitled, "The Call to Teach". Goodman then did graduate work in education at Temple University, while teaching at the Potter School in Philadelphia.

On June 18, 1920, Goodman married Louise Wynkoop Waygood, the daughter of a Presbyterian minister and a 1918 honors graduate of Swarthmore College. They had three children: Theodore (born 1921), George (born 1923), and Lydia Ann (born 1927). He was a member of Kiwanis, Rotary International, and a Freemason, joining Robert A. Lamberton Lodge No. 487, Free and Accepted Masons of Philadelphia on March 5, 1918.

== Scouting career ==
=== As a volunteer and local council leader ===
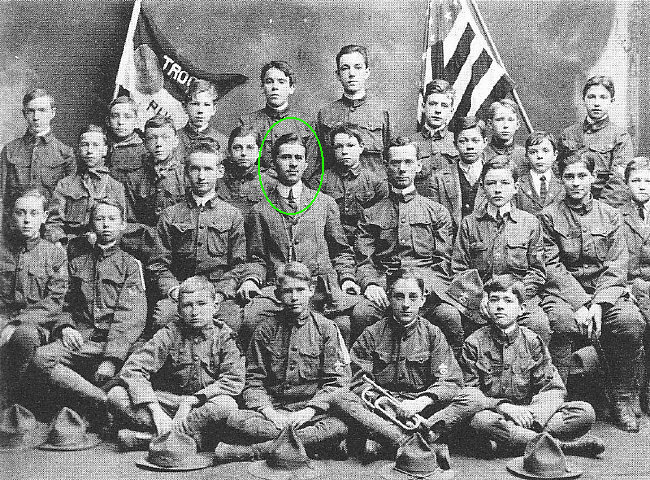
E. Urner Goodman (circled in green) and Troop 1 in 1913

While studying for his degree in education, Goodman first became involved in Boy Scouting in 1911 when only 20 years old, as a volunteer Scoutmaster of Troop 1, the first Scout troop in Philadelphia. As far as can be established, this would make him the second-youngest Scoutmaster in the history of the BSA. In his four years as Scoutmaster, the troop grew to more than 100 Scouts. A contemporary of Goodman described him in 1912 as "well beloved by the boys, enjoys their confidence and is heart and soul in this phase of the work." In later years, he would recall with nostalgia his troop, noting that renowned composer Albert Hay Malotte was "one of his boys" in Troop 1. On April 1, 1915, he entered full-time professional service in Boy Scouting as a field executive, called a "Field Commissioner" at the time. That summer, Goodman served as director of the Philadelphia Scout Council's summer camp. He was promoted in December 1917 to Scout executive of the Philadelphia Council.

Goodman's professional Scouting career was interrupted during World War I, when he was drafted into the U.S. Army shortly after his promotion to Scout executive. He served in the infantry as a first lieutenant, but his unit was never sent overseas. In December 1918, he was discharged from the Army and resumed his professional career as Scout executive in Philadelphia. Spotlighted in an October 1920 column in the Philadelphia Evening Ledger, Goodman described Scouting as "leading boys through the muscle-building, mind-developing, character-forming program of scouting". He cited Scouting's service in the war effort and extolled the movement as "absolutely nonpartisan, nonsectarian, and democratic", bringing together "diverse elements".

Goodman served as Scout executive in Philadelphia until May 1927, when he was promoted to the larger Chicago Area Council as Scout executive (1927–1931). During his four-year tenure in the "Windy City", he reversed a decline in finances and increased Scout membership from 11,806 to 16,920.

=== As a national leader ===
On April 1, 1931, Goodman was promoted by Chief Scout Executive James E. West to become national program director of the BSA, as part of an organizational restructuring. Goodman was one of four division directors reporting to West (the other divisions were operations, personnel, and business). As national program director, he was responsible for professional and volunteer training, relations with sponsoring organizations, public relations, and program development. The Cub Scouting and Exploring programs were established under his leadership. He greatly expanded BSA training programs for adult leaders, establishing the BSA's highly regarded national training center at Schiff Scout Reservation in New Jersey in 1932 and, later, the training program at Philmont Scout Ranch, beginning in 1938. He also oversaw the publication of the Boy Scout Handbook, edited by his good friend and colleague William "Green Bar Bill" Hillcourt, as well as the Handbook for Scoutmasters and the first edition of the widely read Scout Field Book. Goodman also wrote the Leader's Handbook, a key instructional guide for Scout leaders.

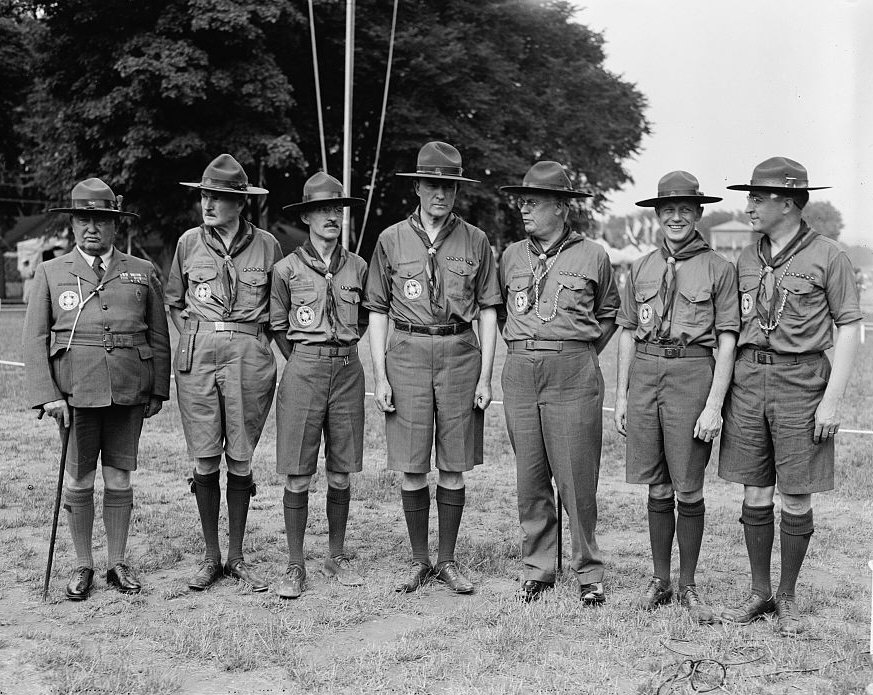
BSA leaders at the 1937 national Scout jamboree: E. Urner Goodman (3rd from left), BSA Pres. Head (4th from left), James E. West (5th from left)

In early July 1937, the BSA held its first national Scout jamboree in Washington, D. C., attended by 25,000 Scouts and Scouters. In addition to overseeing the innovative event itself, Goodman's public relations service did yeoman work to ensure extensive news media coverage. A jamboree press tent accommodated 626 news media reporters, photographers, and broadcasters. Sixty-four news releases were issued and the public relations service assisted in the making of 11 newsreels and 53 magazine articles. The three major U.S. radio networks of the time, NBC, CBS and Mutual, all set up complete broadcasting studios near the jamboree headquarters to produce almost 19 hours of live, on-site jamboree coverage broadcast coast-to-coast. Celebrities also visited the jamboree, including well-known broadcaster Lowell Thomas and U.S. President Franklin D. Roosevelt. While at the jamboree, Scouts also attended a three-game baseball series between the Washington Senators and the Boston Red Sox at Griffith Stadium, with Goodman arranging for Eagle Scouts to have a place of honor with President Roosevelt in the stands (pictured).

In his comprehensive biography of E. Urner Goodman, Nelson Block writes that the mutual respect between Goodman and West grew over their 12 years of working together at the national BSA office: "West, the hardworking, detail-oriented executive, came to rely on Goodman and his style of accomplishing big things through diligent organization and planning, executed by carefully recruited staff...".

When the venerable youth leader and longtime National Scout Commissioner Daniel Carter Beard died shortly before his 91st birthday in June 1941, Goodman was selected to be in charge of the beloved pioneer's funeral in Suffern, New York. An estimated 2,000 people lined the funeral route to the cemetery in Monsey, New York, where 127 Boy Scouts formed an honor guard and assisted with traffic control.

Goodman (far right) and Eagle Scouts with FDR (center) at Griffith Stadium ballgame

As war clouds cast an ominous shadow over Europe in the late 1930s amidst the rise of fascism, West, Goodman, and other BSA leaders considered how Scouting might better train youth in democratic principles of government. Referring to the Nazi Kristallnacht rampage against Jews in 1938, Goodman wrote shortly afterwards: "...the program of persecution has stirred up our hearts and minds as nothing else that has happened before has done. It has furnished the impetus of a wave of resentment against the evil; but more than that, for a surge of satisfaction and thanksgiving concerning our own happier state under a democracy." During World War II, various BSA programs were developed under his leadership in support of the nation's war effort, such as the collection of scrap aluminum, tires, and waste paper for recycling into war material, distribution of war bond and air raid posters, assisting Civil Defense officials, and planting of fruit and vegetable "victory gardens".

On September 16, 1951, Goodman retired as national program director, ending a professional Scouting career spanning 36 years. He was given the title of National Field Scout Commissioner, to continue his service to Scouting on the national level as a layman.

=== Founding and development of the Order of the Arrow ===
As the Philadelphia Council's newly hired field executive in 1915, one of Goodman's assignments was to serve as director of the council's summer camp at Treasure Island Scout Reservation on the Delaware River. He devised a number of imaginative features to enhance the six week camp program that summer. Among his innovations was creation of a simulated "Municipal Government", with himself as "Mayor", assistant camp director Carroll A. Edson as "Chief of Police", and other staff serving as "aldermen" and "judges" to govern the camp. He also whimsically dubbed the camp's rowboats and canoes the Treasure Island "Navy", with a Council executive sailing the "flagship" down the Delaware River. Of more lasting importance, Goodman believed that the summer camp experience should do more than just teach proficiency in Scoutcraft skills; rather, the principles embodied in the Scout Oath and Scout Law should become realities in the lives of Scouts. Along with Edson, he started an experimental program to recognize those Scouts best exemplifying those traits as an example to their peers.

Goodman and Edson were strongly influenced by the use of American Indian culture by Ernest Thompson Seton in his Woodcraft Indians program. They decided to create an honor society of their own at camp that summer, in a manner befitting a boy's interest and understanding. Goodman utilized the appeal of Indian lore and recognition by a Scout's peers as motivational tools. He devised a program where troops chose, at the camp's conclusion, those boys from among their number who best exemplified the ideals of Scouting. Those elected were acknowledged as having displayed, in the eyes of their fellow Scouts, a spirit of unselfish service and brotherhood. Edson helped Goodman research the traditions and language of the Lenni Lenape—also known as the Delaware—who had once inhabited Treasure Island.

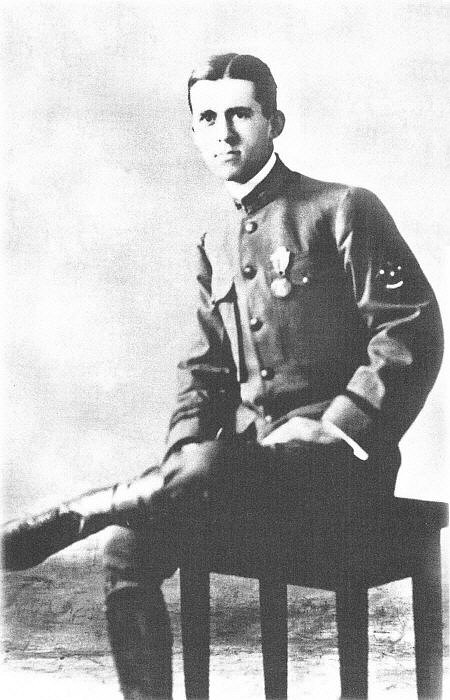
E. Urner Goodman as a young Scouter in 1917

The brotherhood of Scout honor campers with its American Indian overtones was a success and was repeated again the following summer at Treasure Island. Those Scouts honored at Treasure Island in 1915 and 1916 would eventually become members of the Order of the Arrow's Unami Lodge.

By 1921, Goodman had spoken to Scout leaders in surrounding states about the OA, and lodges were established in a score of Scout councils in the northeast. In October 1921, he convened the first national meeting of what was then called the National Lodge of the Order of the Arrow in Philadelphia, and Goodman was elected Grand Chieftain. Committees were organized to formulate a constitution, refine ceremonial rituals, devise insignia, and plan future development. Reflecting Goodman's ongoing interest in music, he composed the words to the Order of the Arrow's song, "Firm Bound in Brotherhood", set to the stirring melody of a hymn found in the Presbyterian hymnal of the 1920s, "God the Omnipotent" in 11.10.11.9 meter, which was adapted from the Russian national anthem, "God Save the Tsar!", composed by Alexei Lvov in 1833.

In the early 1920s, many Scout executives were skeptical of what they called "secret camp fraternities". By September 1922, opposition to the Order of the Arrow was such that a formal resolution opposing "camp fraternities" was proposed at a national meeting of Scout executives. Goodman argued against the motion: "Using the Scout ideals as our great objective", he said, a camp activity that will "further the advancement of those ideals" should not be suppressed. The motion was narrowly defeated, and the fledgling Order continued as an experimental program throughout the 1920s and 1930s.

Goodman maintained his active support of the OA's National Lodge, as it was then called, during his years as Scout executive in Chicago and then BSA national program director. In observance of the 15th anniversary of the brotherhood's founding, the National Lodge presented Goodman with a medal in 1930 formally recognizing him as founder. In 1940, the National Lodge presented him with the first Distinguished Service Award on the OA's 25th anniversary. The citation said, in part, "As the founder of the Order of the Arrow, through his ability, wisdom, and foresight, his vision of service to others was transformed into a national honor brotherhood which has been a positive influence in the lives of thousands of boys...". When he was first appointed as director in 1931, there were OA lodges in seven percent of BSA councils nationwide. By 1948, about two-thirds of the BSA councils had established OA lodges. In that year, three years before Goodman's retirement from the BSA, his "honor society of Scout camping" innovation was fully integrated as an official part of the Scouting program. Kenneth Davis, in his book The Brotherhood of Cheerful Service: A History of the Order of the Arrow, concludes that the National Council's approval in 1948 "...was due largely to his [Goodman's] personal efforts and recommendation...".

Over the decades since the Order of the Arrow's founding, more than one million Scouts and Scouters have worn the OA sash on their uniforms, denoting membership in the Brotherhood of Cheerful Service. There are presently 183,000 members of the Order of the Arrow in all but two of BSA councils nationwide. Summarizing what he felt the order signified, E. Urner Goodman wrote in the foreword to the Order of the Arrow Handbook from the perspective of more than a half century after the brotherhood's inception:

The Order of the Arrow is a 'thing of the spirit' rather than of mechanics. Organization, operational procedure, and paraphernalia are necessary in any large and growing movement, but they are not what count in the end. The things of the spirit count:

- Brotherhood – in a day when there is too much hatred at home and abroad.
- Cheerfulness – in a day when the pessimists have the floor.
- Service – in a day when millions are interested only in getting or grasping rather than giving.

These are of the spirit, blessed of God, the great Divine Spirit."

== National Council of Churches leadership ==
Following his retirement from professional Scouting, Goodman served the National Council of Churches (NCC) during 1951–1954 as the NCC's first general director of the United Church Men, a laymen's program he formed to strengthen men's ties to local churches and their communities. Goodman publicly inaugurated the laymen's group on October 7, 1951, in Cincinnati, Ohio. By the end of 1952, United Church Men departments were formed in more than 24 states, providing financial support to NCC-affiliated colleges and missionary work. His new post entailed working closely with Eugene Carson Blake, NCC president (1954–1957), and meeting frequently with officials of the participating denominations in the NCC. Speaking with various men's church groups in the U.S. and abroad was, he believed, a means of promoting brotherhood. Reflecting on his NCC service with these notable church leaders, Goodman said more than a decade later, "Great faith and devoted service, I am very sure, are for ordinary folk as well as for the clergy. ... I have been privileged to know some great clergymen in my day ... but I have also known and loved some truly great laymen, men whose lives and works matched their faith". Goodman retired from his NCC post on September 1, 1954, because of tuberculosis.

== Later years ==
Maintaining his lifelong interest in music, Goodman was active in the Hymn Society of America (now the Hymn Society in the United States and Canada) in the 1960s and 1970s, and three hymns he composed were published: "Christ Calls Men", "As Within the Pillared Temple", and "O God of Love, Who Gavest Life".

In 1965, Goodman wrote The Building of a Life, a collection of reminiscences recounting some of his Scouting experiences and giving advice to young men. Summing up his years in Scouting and church work, he wrote, "In the last analysis, it is the things of the spirit rather than material possessions that count." Later that year, the Goodmans moved to the Penney Retirement Community at Penney Farms, Florida. Goodman then served as Director of Christian Education at Flagler Presbyterian Church in St. Augustine, Florida.

In retirement, the Goodmans enjoyed a rich family life, visiting often with son Theodore ("Ted") and his wife Carol, and daughter Lydia Ann ("Ann") and son-in-law Bob. To his unabashed delight, Urner and Louise Goodman had nine grandchildren. Their son George was killed in action in France during World War II, however. Upon hearing the news in December 1944, Goodman was deeply grieved, and Louise, his wife of 60 years, said it was the only time she ever saw him cry.

Although retired, Goodman remained active in Order of the Arrow affairs during the 1960s and 1970s. Acclaimed as an eloquent orator, his keynote addresses at the OA's biennial National Order of the Arrow Conferences reportedly made an unforgettable impression upon his youthful audiences. Nelson Block writes in A Thing of the Spirit, that even in the 1970s the octogenarian founder "crisscrossed the country to attend lodge and section events... surrounded by young Arrowmen...witty and charming, keeping everyone enthralled with his stories." Displaying his self-deprecating humor, Goodman himself was more prosaic about all of the adulation he received at OA gatherings, writing that, "to many of the young men I was a museum piece. In fact I have been informed that there was considerable surprise because I didn't hobble in on a cane and mumble in my dentures." But, he added, "I looked upon them with deep emotion, for there was a spiritual bond".

Reflecting on his career, Goodman said late in life:

I had indeed found my life mission...Those 36 years of professional service, 16 years as executive in Philadelphia and Chicago, and 20 years as national program director, brought rich rewards, far beyond any salary considerations. They represented the work, above all others, that I wanted to do.

He continued speaking with OA members until shortly before his death at age 88, when he succumbed to pneumonia on March 13, 1980, at Lenox Hill Hospital in New York City. He was buried at Penney Farms, Florida, on March 29, 1980. At his funeral, held at the Penney Memorial Church in Penney Farms, Goodman was eulogized by Executive Secretary of the Order of the Arrow William F. Downs: "The shake of [his] hand, sincerity of greeting, twinkle in the eye, smile and dignity immediately relayed...the feeling of confidence from the leader, so necessary to build teamwork. Urner made you feel important".

== Honors and awards ==
Upon his retirement from full-time professional Scouting in 1951, Goodman was awarded an honorary Doctorate in Humanics from Missouri Valley College, the first such degree awarded by the college. He was also honored in 1947 when he was made an honorary chief of the Blackfoot Tribe of American Indians and given the name "Chief Eagle".

In his memory, the BSA confers the E. Urner Goodman Camping Award, recognizing lodges that have excelled in the promotion of camping within their host council. The Founder's Award is given by Order of the Arrow lodges in honor of OA co-founders Goodman and Edson. Up until 2004, the BSA administered the E. Urner Goodman Scholarship Fund program, providing financial grants towards the college education of Arrowmen aspiring to professional Scouting careers.

A scouting museum named after Goodman is located at Owasippe Scout Reservation in Twin Lake, Michigan. Goodman was previously the reservation director at Owasippe.

== See also ==
- Boy Scouts of America
- Boy Scout Handbook
- National Council of Churches
- Order of the Arrow
