= Order of the Arrow honors and awards =

Recognition in the Order of the Arrow

There are several awards, honors, and membership levels in the Order of the Arrow, the national honor society of Scouting America. Any of the awards of the Order of the Arrow (OA) may be presented to an individual regardless of which membership level they have achieved. The Vigil Honor may only be bestowed upon Brotherhood Members.

== The Vigil Honor ==
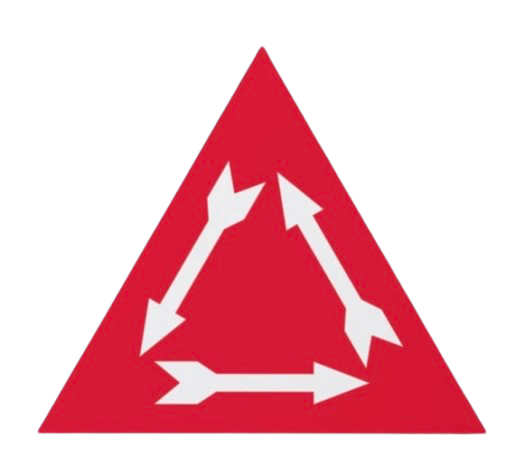
The Vigil Honor triangle.

The Vigil Honor was first bestowed upon E. Urner Goodman by the Unami Lodge in 1915, and has since been conferred annually as a national recognition for noteworthy service by a member to the lodge, council camp, or Scouting. New Vigil Honor members are nominated, approved, and inducted annually in all current OA lodges.

Lodges nominate Brotherhood members for the Vigil Honor according to specific national requirements, with nominations limited to two percent of the lodge's membership. At least half of the lodge's nominees must also be youth members at the time of nomination. Those members whose nominations have been approved by the National OA office are inducted during a special ceremony. Recipients wear a different sash, similar to the Brotherhood sash but with the Vigil triangle in the center of the main arrow. Additionally, recipients are bestowed an honorary name that represents the Arrowman. The National OA office also issues a Vigil Honor certificate with the honoree's given name. Previously, the honoree's Vigil name in the Lenape language was on the certificate as well.

== Individual awards ==
=== Distinguished Service Award ===
The DSA medal and square knot.

The Distinguished Service Award (DSA) is an award for those who have rendered distinguished and outstanding service to the OA on a sectional, regional, or national basis over a period of many years.

The first awards were presented to E. Urner Goodman, Carroll A. Edson, and eight others at the 1940 national meeting in Camp Twin Echo, Pennsylvania. Between 1940 and the first national conference in 1948, the award was presented at national meetings as deserving individuals were found. Thereafter, the award presentation became a traditional part of the pageantry and ceremony of the National Order of the Arrow Conference.

Since the time of the first awards in 1940, fewer than 1,200 Distinguished Service Awards have been presented. The award itself is a sterling silver arrowhead, bearing an arrow pointing upward and to the wearer's right, suspended from a white neck-ribbon upon which are embroidered red arrows (the first awards were suspended from a forest green ribbon – the current ribbon has been in use since the 1960s). A white square knot embroidered upon red cloth is available for uniform wear, and a miniature silver arrowhead lapel pin is available for civilian wear.

=== Founder's Award ===
The Founder's Award medallion.

The Founder's Award was first introduced at the 1981 National Order of the Arrow Conference following the death of founder Goodman. This award honors Arrowmen for unselfish service above and beyond their normal duties to their lodge. Any lodge may present the award to up to two arrowmen annually; larger lodges may present up to four awards. If more than one Founder's Award is presented, at least one must be presented to a youth member. Lodges are not required to give the Founder's Award if they feel that no one is worthy of it. A member may only receive the award once in their lifetime.

The award is a bronze medallion bearing the images of Goodman and Edson. The reverse of the medallion reads "For he who serves his fellows, is of all his fellows, greatest." The recipient may wear a red OA Pocket Device with a gold arrow, instead of the standard red and white with a silver arrow. The recipient is also presented with a certificate detailing their name and lodge.

=== Red Arrow Award ===
The Red Arrow Award, normally placed on a plaque.

The Red Arrow Award is similar in nature to the Distinguished Service but is given to non-members only. It was first awarded in 1967. Because some of those honored were women who have since joined the OA, (female Scouters are now eligible for membership), they are the only OA members who have received it. The honoree receives a silver medallion superimposed on an engraved plaque.

=== OA Triple Crown Award ===
First given in 2005, this award is given to youth Arrowmen who have attended and completed three out of the five Order of the Arrow High Adventure programs at the high adventure bases in Scouting America. This award is not the official Triple Crown of High Adventure award that is awarded by Charles L. Sommers Alumni Association, Inc. (Northern Tier’s alumni association) in conjunction with Scouting America. However, those who have completed Order of the Arrow High Adventure programs at three National High Adventure Bases may qualify for the official Triple Crown of High Adventure award.

== Retired awards ==
=== Lifetime Achievement Award ===
The Legacy of Servant Leadership Lifetime Achievement Award was created by the National Order of the Arrow Committee in 2002 to recognize Scouters who built an enduring legacy to Scouting and the Order of the Arrow through a lifetime of cheerful service. The recipient must have been a Vigil Honor member, have received the Distinguished Service Award, and been an OA member for at least 25 years. In 2018, after just six recipients, the National Order of the Arrow Committee voted unanimously to retire the Lifetime Achievement Award and affirm the Distinguished Service Award as the highest award presented by the Order of the Arrow.

=== Centurion Award ===
Introduced for the centennial year of the Order of the Arrow, the Centurion Award was a one-time only award created to recognize Arrowmen who meaningfully contributed to the forming, maturing, or ongoing operation of their lodge. Recipients were designated as either a youth or adult contributor, with a minimum service period of three years for youth and six years for adults. Posthumous awards were permitted.

Lodges selected over 1,800 Arrowmen for the award. Recipients received a certificate and a metallic centennial totem suspended from a red and white neck-ribbon.

=== Leadership in Service Award ===
Between 2005 and 2007, the National Order of the Arrow Committee created the Leadership in Service Award to recognize both youth and adult members completing a set number of hours of service on community and lodge levels. The award was given over three years with first year recipients receiving a red acrylic pocket arrow suspended from on a blue device and second and third year recipients receiving silver and gold palms, respectively.

=== E. Urner Goodman Camping Award ===
Beginning in 1969, the National Council of the Order of the Arrow selected two lodges from each region to receive the E. Urner Goodman Camping Award. This award recognized lodges that made outstanding contributions to promoting (and increasing) camping within their host council. Also considered was the number of Arrowmen who served on their council's summer camp staff. The OA ceased to issue the award after 2019. https://en.wikipedia.org/w/index.php?title=Order_of_the_Arrow_honors_and_awards&action=edit&section=11

=== National Service Award ===
Started in 1999, the National Service Award recognizes four Lodges each year whose service work is exemplary in both quality and quantity. The Lodge must petition for the award and show proof of their accomplishments, in addition to being certified a Quality Lodge for that year. The award was discontinued in 2019.

== Scholarships ==
=== Josh Sain Memorial Scholarship ===
This scholarship was established in 1998 to honor the spirit and the memory of Josh Sain, a former National Vice Chief of the Order of the Arrow. The scholarships are provided to immediate past national officers, immediate past region chiefs, and immediate past section chiefs, upon completion of their successful service of their terms. All awards are selected on merit and based on performance in their respective roles and academic achievements while serving in one of the roles mentioned above.

=== E. Urner Goodman Scholarship Fund (retired) ===
The E. Urner Goodman Scholarship was awarded annually by Scouting America to members of the Order of the Arrow who were preparing for a professional career in Scouting. The scholarships were intended to help cover the financial costs of a college education. The fund was discontinued in 2004 after four years of operation.

=== Maury Clancy Indian Campership Fund (retired) ===
This fund was created in 1971 to help American Indian Scouts attend Scouting America resident camp, and was renamed to honor Clancy after his death in 1975. It was retired in 2024.
