= Carroll A. Edson =

American scouting pioneer (1891–1986)

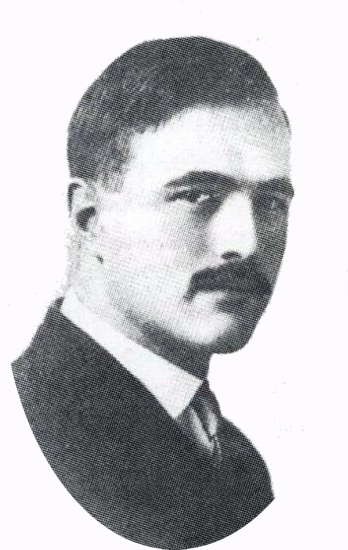
- Carroll A. Edson in 1915 as Treasure Island Associate Director in charge of Commissary.
- Born: December 29, 1891; Worcester, Massachusetts, US
- Died: October 25, 1986 (aged 94); Concord, New Hampshire, US
- Education: Dartmouth College (BS); Columbia University (MA)
- Spouse: Hazel Howard Partridge
- Children: 4

Colonel Carroll Andrew Edson (December 29, 1891 – October 25, 1986) was an influential leader in the Boy Scouts of America movement. He helped to found the Order of the Arrow (OA) along with E. Urner Goodman. The OA is an official program of the Boy Scouts of America designed to recognize Scouts and Scouters for their service, and to aid in the retention of older boys in the Scouting program.

== Early life ==
Edson was born on December 29, 1891.

He married Hazel Howard Partridge on August 28, 1919. They had four children.

== Education ==
Edson earned a Bachelor of Science magna cum laude in Engineering from Dartmouth College in 1914 where he was a member of the Phi Beta Kappa Society. He later received a Master of Arts from Teachers College of Columbia University in 1931.

== Career ==
=== Scouting ===
Edson was hired by the Philadelphia Council of the Boy Scouts of America in 1915 as a Field Commissioner. He was then appointed as the Assistant Camp Director in charge of commissary at Treasure Island Scout Reservation. There he worked with the Camp Director E. Urner Goodman to create an experimental camp fraternity program called the Wimachtendienk, later known as the Order of the Arrow. After attending a speech by Ernest Thompson Seton on his Woodcraft Indians program, Edson urged that American Indian lore be incorporated into the fraternity. This was to make the organization more appealing to youth. Edson himself researched the history and language of the Lenni Lenape (the Delaware Indians) in order to make the names and culture of the program authentic. He and Goodman conducted the original rituals and the speaking roles at the public campfire were primarily done by Edson. He was the second to receive the Vigil Honor and kept his Vigil in 1917.

In 1921 Edson was hired by the Chicago Area Council as a Field Executive for the South Shore District. In that position he founded five more Order of the Arrow lodges in Chicago. He was the Chairman in 1921 for the first Grand Lodge Meeting where he ran for Grand Lodge Chieftain, but lost to Goodman. At the second Grand Lodge Meeting in 1922, Edson ran again for Chieftain, but lost to Arthur Schuck, the Grand Treasurer. Edson ran unopposed and became the Grand Lodge Chieftain in 1923 at the Third Grand Lodge Meeting.

In 1927 Edson was hired to be the Scout Executive for Hudson Council (currently part of Northern New Jersey Council) in Jersey City, New Jersey. He remained in this position until he left Scouting in 1931.

Edson was also one of the inaugural Distinguished Service Award recipients in 1940. He later returned in the 1960s and became active again in the Order of the Arrow.

=== Military ===
Edson joined the military and attended the first officer's training camp at Plattsburgh, New York, in 1917. During World War I he served as a captain in the United States Army with the 77th Division. In 1931 he attended Infantry School at Fort Benning and then in 1936 he attended the Command and General Staff School at Fort Leavenworth. He was promoted to colonel in 1938 and recalled to active duty as an instructor at the Command and General Staff School in 1940. He served in both World Wars and was a member of The Retired Officers Association.

=== Educator ===
In 1935, Edson served as an education program director for the Civilian Conservation Corps and an education adviser for the Fourth Corps Area Headquarters in Atlanta, Georgia.

=== Management ===
Edson then became the manager for the Social Security Administration's office in Syracuse in 1937 where he worked for twenty-five years until he retired in 1961.

== Lat years and death ==
Carroll and his wife Hazel to Tucson, Arizona. After her death, he returned to the Northeast.

Edson died on October 25, 1986, at the age of 94. He is buried in Brookfield Cemetery in Brookfield, Vermont.

== See also ==
- Treasure Island Scout Reservation
- Unami Lodge
