= Unami Lodge =

Boy Scouts of America lodge in Pennsylvania

Unami Lodge, One
- Totem: Turtle
- Owner: Cradle of Liberty Council
- Headquarters: Philadelphia, Pennsylvania
- Location: Philadelphia and surrounding counties
- Country: United States
- Founded: 1915 (with mergers in 1915 and 1996)
- Lodge Chief: Matthew Rouleau
- Lodge Adviser: Todge Sutkowski
- Staff Adviser: John Bickel
- Website unamilodge.org

Unami Lodge, One is the Order of the Arrow (OA) lodge of the Cradle of Liberty Council, Boy Scouts of America (BSA) and the founding Lodge of the OA, having celebrated its centennial in 2015. The current Unami Lodge resulted from the 1996 merger of Unami Lodge 1 and Delmont Lodge 43, caused by the merger of Philadelphia Council and Valley Forge Council. The chiefs of each lodge agreed to preserve Unami's rich history and traditions by retaining the founding lodge's name and number. Delmont Lodge's history, including its roster of Vigil Honor, Founder's Award, and David Fortunato Outstanding Service Award recipients, is preserved as part of Unami Lodge's history. The lodge's totem is the turtle, reflecting both the name of the animal (unami) in the Delaware language, but also its association with its peoples.

== History ==
The Order of the Arrow was founded in 1915 at a Scout summer camp on Treasure Island, on the Delaware River near Philadelphia. The two men principally responsible for its creation were camp director E. Urner Goodman and his assistant Carroll A. Edson.

Goodman and Edson were looking for ways to improve the camp and to keep the older boys coming back. They looked at several sources in creating their new 'camp fraternity', including:

- Edward Cave's Boy's Camp Book (1914) for the concept of a camp society that would perpetuate camp traditions.
- College fraternities for the concepts of Brotherhood and rituals, and the idea of new members pledging themselves to the new organization.
- Ernest Thompson Seton's Woodcraft Indians In fact, the true name of the Order means Brotherhood of Cheerful Service in the Lenape language.
- Brotherhood of Andrew and Philip, a Presbyterian church youth group with which Goodman had been involved as a young man.
- Freemasonry and its traditions and rituals probably contributed more to the basic structure of the rituals than any other organization. In an interview with Carroll Edson during his later years, he recalled that the task of writing the first rituals of the Order of the Arrow was assigned to an early member who was "a 32nd degree Mason." Familiar terms such as "lodge" and "obligation," were borrowed from Masonic practice, as were some ceremonial practices. Even the early national meeting was called a "Grand Lodge," thought to be a Masonic reference. Goodman became a Mason only after the OA was established.

The Order earned official recognition as a BSA program experiment in 1922, along with several other honor societies. It acquired its present name at the same time. A meeting of the National Lodge at the Owasippe Scout Reservation in 1933 voted to recommend that the BSA adopt it as part of its official program, which the National Council did in 1934. Full integration was completed in 1948.

Philadelphia Council also had several other OA lodges in the early days of the OA (an early bylaw allowed each Scout camp within a "first class council" to have its own OA lodge). A second Philadelphia Lodge (Unalachtigo, 8) based on the Turkey Clan of the Delawares is soon established at Philadelphia Council's Camp Biddle. The others folded to become part of Unami Lodge after bylaw changes and camp closures.

Goodman wanted to develop methods to teach the scouts that proficiency in Scoutcraft skills was not enough, but that the principles embodied in the Scout Oath and Scout Law should be integrated in their lives. He developed a program based on peer recognition and the appeal of Indian lore. He used Ernest Thompson Seton's Woodcraft Indians to make the organization interesting and appealing to youth, which led them to incorporating traditions and legends of the local Lenni Lenape (Delaware) Indians in the OA's ceremonies.

Edson and others helped research the history and language of the Delaware Indians who had been local to the area. The induction ceremonies developed for the lodge, would go on to be the foundation of all the ceremonies of the "Order of the Arrow."

=== Delmont Lodge ===
Delmont Lodge
- Delmont Lodge flap
- Totem: Seville Memorial Cabin
- Headquarters: Valley Forge, Pennsylvania
- Location: Delaware and Montgomery Counties, PA
- Founded: 1929
- Defunct: 1996 (merged with Unami Lodge)

Delmont Lodge was the Order of the Arrow Lodge of the Valley Forge Council, Boy Scouts of America (BSA). It was the 43rd chartered OA lodge. With the merger of Valley Forge Council and Philadelphia Council in 1996 to form the Cradle of Liberty Council, Delmont Lodge and Unami Lodge merged at that time. The chiefs of each lodge agreed to preserve Unami's rich history and traditions by retaining the founding lodge's name and number. Delmont Lodge's history, including its roster of Vigil Honor and Founder's Award recipients, are preserved as part of Unami Lodge's history. The lodge's totem was the Seville Memorial Cabin.

== See also ==
- Scouting in Pennsylvania
