= Cradle of Liberty Council =

Scouting America council near Philadelphia

Cradle of Liberty Council (#525)
- Owner: Scouting America
- Headquarters: King of Prussia, Pennsylvania, U.S.
- Country: United States
- Founded: 1996
- Board Chair: Geoffrey Sasso
- Council Commissioner: Julia Goplerud
- Scout Executive: Daniel Templar
- Website http://www.scoutingphilly.org/

The Cradle of Liberty Council (#525) is a Scouting America council created in 1996 with the merger of the former Philadelphia Council (covering the city and county of Philadelphia) and the former Valley Forge Council (covering Delaware and Montgomery counties).

== History ==
Valley Forge Council shoulder patch

Philadelphia Council shoulder patch

The present council is the result of the 1996 merger of Philadelphia and Valley Forge councils. The Philadelphia Council was founded in 1911. In 1913, the Council opened one of the earliest Scout camps in the United States, Treasure Island Scout Reservation, near Point Pleasant, Pennsylvania. Two years later, Dr. E. Urner Goodman and Carrol Edson founded the Order of the Arrow there, inducting the first members on July 16, 1915. The Philadelphia Council opened Camp Hart (later Hart Scout Reservation) in Green Lane, Pennsylvania in 1930.

The Valley Forge Council began operation in the 1910s as Delaware and Montgomery County Council, although the council office was never within the council boundaries in Center City Philadelphia until the 1960s, when it was moved to Valley Forge in Chester County. The council was renamed "Valley Forge Council" in the late 1930s. The council was named for the George Washington's historic winter encampment of 1777–78 at Valley Forge. The council opened Camp Delmont (later called "Delmont Scout Reservation" as of the early 1960s) in 1916 in Green Lane, Pennsylvania. Camp Hart and Camp Delmont were adjacent properties.

In 1955, some 4,600 acres became available in Marshall's Creek. Site of a hunting facility, it was found admirably suited for Scouting purposes and purchased jointly by the "Federation" of Philadelphia and Valley Forge Councils to create Resica Falls Scout Reservation. Joint development and use occurred until 1965, when Valley Forge Council bought out Philadelphia Council's interest and the federation was dissolved. When the two councils merged in 1996 to create Cradle of Liberty Council, Scouts from Philadelphia, Delaware, and Montgomery Counties once again camp together. Since February 22, 1913, Valley Forge Council, and its predecessor had hosted an annual Scouting event, the Valley Forge Pilgrimage and Encampment, which is sponsored by the Cradle of Liberty Council.

During the 1980s and 1990s, a large percentage of Philadelphia's population moved to the suburbs. Accordingly, the two councils' executive boards began the merger process in 1993, which was finalized in 1996.

When councils merge, so do their Order of the Arrow lodges. Philadelphia's OA lodge, Unami One, was founded in 1915 on Treasure Island, and recognized as the first lodge nationally. Valley Forge Council's OA lodge, Delmont Lodge 43, the much larger of the two lodges, was founded in 1929 at Camp Delmont. When the councils merged, Delmont decided to merge with Unami Lodge and retain Unami's name.

== Organization ==
- Baden-Powell District: Ambler, Blue Bell, Conshohocken, Lafayette Hill, Lower Gwynedd, Oreland, Plymouth Meeting, Upper Dublin and Whitemarsh.
- Conestoga District: Interboro, Ridley, Southeast Delco, Springfield, Upper Darby and William Penn School Districts in Delaware County, PA.
- Constellation District: Haverford, Lower Merion, Marple Newtown & Radnor Townships.
- Continental District: Pottstown, Pottsgrove, Boyertown & Upper Perkiomen school districts (northwest Montgomery County).
- General Nash District: Souderton and North Penn school districts in Montgomery County, Pennsylvania.
- Lafayette District: the communities and school districts of Upper Merion, Norristown, Methacton, Perkiomen Valley, and Royersford/Spring City.
- Minquas District: Chichester, Chester-Upland, Garnet Valley, Penn-Delco, Rose Tree-Media, and Wallingford-Swarthmore School Districts.
- Northern District: Northwest Philadelphia.
- Roosevelt District: Northeast Philadelphia from the Delaware River (east) to the northeastern Philadelphia city line (north and west) to Roosevelt Boulevard (south). Roosevelt District was formed by the merger of the former Delaware and Frontier Districts in June 2011.
- Triune District: South Philadelphia, West Philadelphia, North Philadelphia and Center City Philadelphia.
- Washington District: Cheltenham, Jenkintown, Abington, Upper Moreland, Lower Moreland, Hatboro-Horsham, and Bryn Athyn school districts.

== Properties and facilities ==
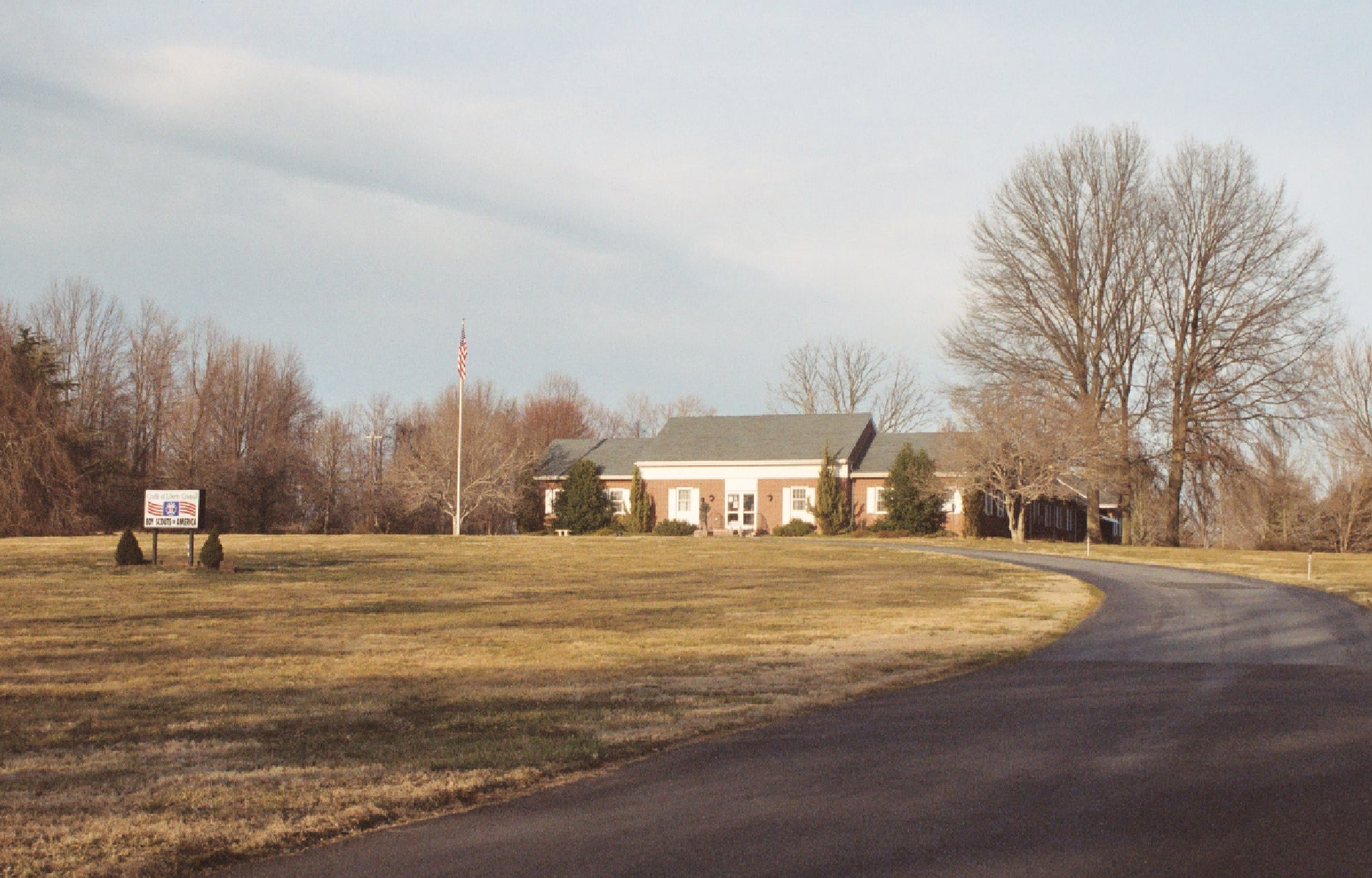
Roger S. Firestone Scout Resource Center

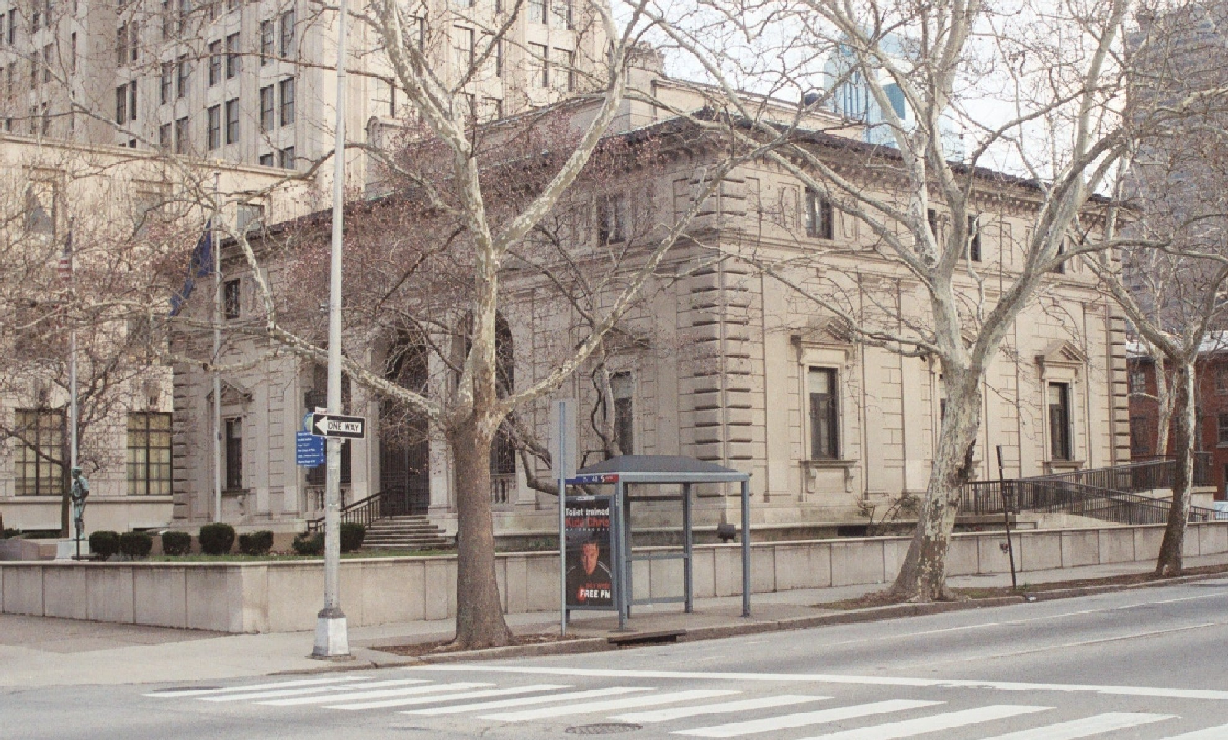
Bruce S. Marks Scout Resource Center in Philadelphia

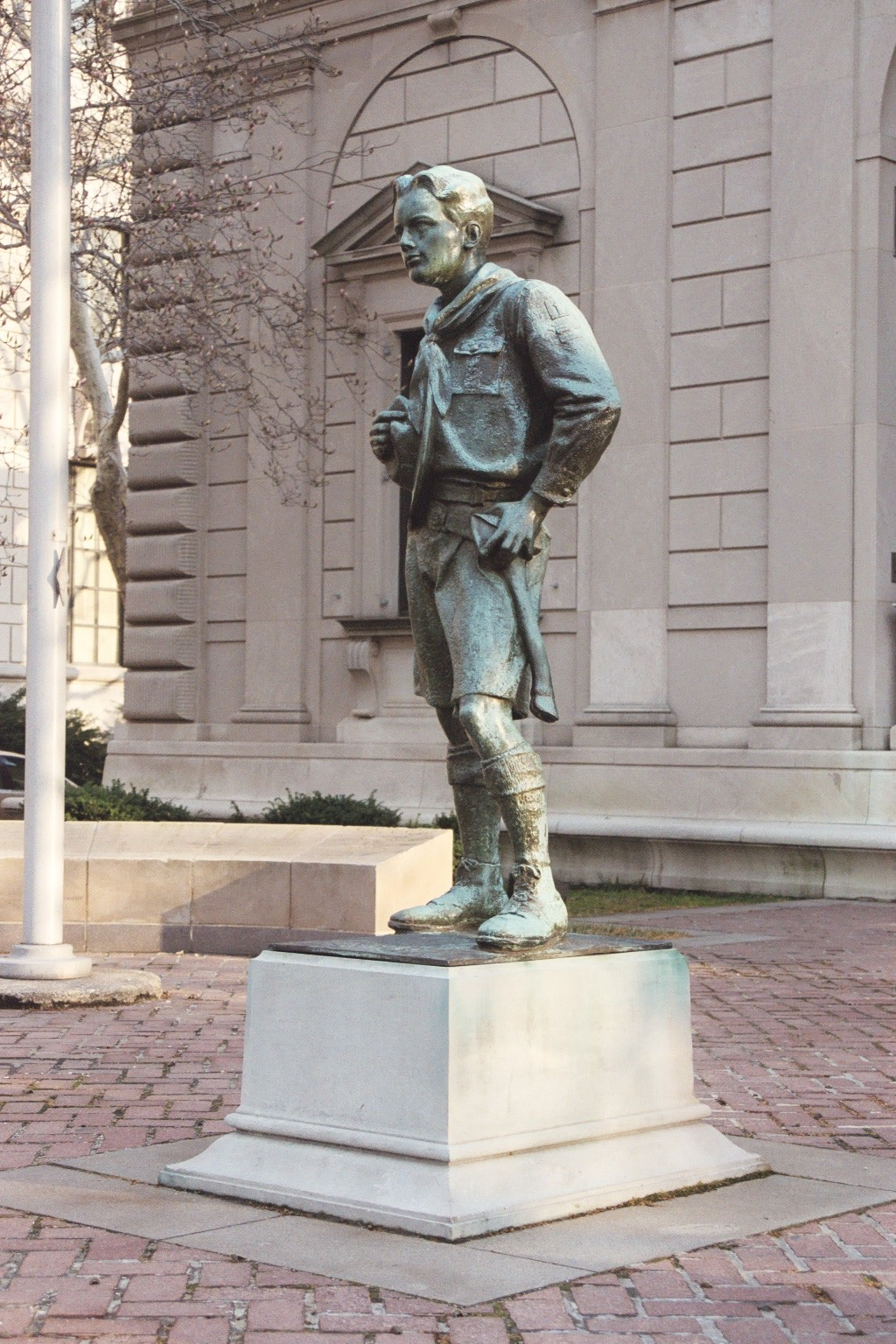
R. Tait McKenzie`s The Ideal Scout (1937), at the Bruce S. Marks Scout Resource Center in Philadelphia

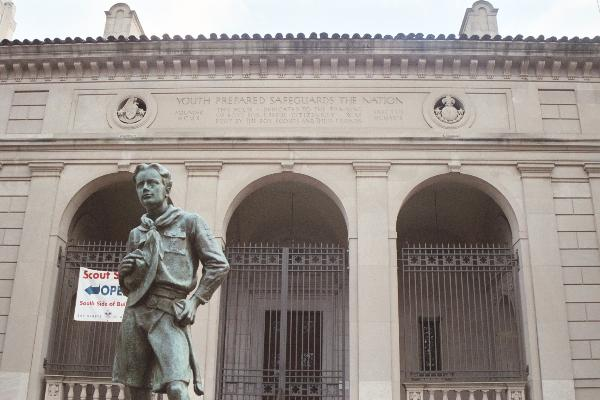
R. Tait McKenzie`s The Ideal Scout (1937), at the Bruce S. Marks Scout Resource Center in Philadelphia

=== Council offices ===
The council headquarters is located at the Cedar Run Corporate Center, 901 E 8th Ave, Suite 103, King of Prussia, PA 19406. The council sold the Roger S. Firestone Scout Resource Center, in Wayne, Pennsylvania.

The Bruce Marks Scout Resource Center in Philadelphia was built in 1929 and served as the council headquarters until 2013. The Beaux Arts style building was designed by architect Charles Klauder. At the time city fathers invited the Scouts to move their offices to the Benjamin Franklin Parkway. The building was built and paid for by the Scouts, and turned over to the city with the understanding that the Scouts would be allowed to remain in it rent-free "in perpetuity." The building is located at 22nd and Winter Streets. The first copy of the R. Tait McKenzie sculpture The Ideal Scout stood outside the building.

==== Headquarters controversy ====
The City of Philadelphia tried to evict the council from their city-owned service center building on the Benjamin Franklin Parkway. The Historic Landmark building laden with Scouting symbols was built and paid for by the Scouts on city land at the city's request in 1929 and the cost of maintenance and renovation has been borne by the Boy Scout council ever since.

This resulted in the Cradle of Liberty Council, Inc., Boy Scouts of America, v. City of Philadelphia also known as Cradle of Liberty Council v. City of Philadelphia, [2:08-cv-02429RB] which was a U.S. Court case involving the Cradle of Liberty Council versus the City of Philadelphia. The case was filed on May 23, 2008, in the United States District Court for the Eastern District of Pennsylvania. Judge Ronald L. Buckwalter presided over the case. The Boy Scouts were represented by Drinker Biddle. The case ended with the court ruling in favor of the Boy Scouts of America that the City of Philadelphia illegally attempted to abrogate the council's federally protected civil rights. Under federal Civil Rights Law, the Cradle of Liberty Council is also entitled to collect its legal costs (estimated at one million dollars) from the city's unlawful action. While the Boy Scouts offered to then settle the dispute by having the City pay half of the legal fees in return for title to the building and the city accepted, the city council reneged. On March 2, 2012, the Federal judge formally ordered the city pay all of the Boy Scouts legal fees and denied the motion for an appeal. The Boy Scouts may also continue reside in the building rent free as they have done since they had paid for construction of the building in 1929.

=== Camps ===
Cradle of Liberty Council operates two camps: the Musser Scout Reservation and the Resica Falls Scout Reservation. The former was formed from the merger of Delmont Scout Reservation and Hart Scout Reservation, which are located near Green Lane, Pennsylvania. Hart and Delmont had been operated by the Philadelphia and Valley Forge councils, respectively, before their merger. Their consolidation under the name Musser Scout Reservation was a tribute to Pete Musser and the Musser family, longtime Scouting supporters.

Resica Falls is composed of Camp Firestone and Camp Big Springs, north of East Stroudsburg, Pennsylvania on the edge of the Pocono Mountains, near the controversial Tocks Island Dam project of the 1960s, now the present-day Delaware Water Gap National Recreational Area. Big Springs is still an active summer camp, but the declining attendance and enrollment of Firestone's summer program has caused its closure.

Until recently, the council also operated Treasure Island Scout Reservation, sometimes called TI. The camp was damaged by Delaware River flooding in 2005 and again in 2006, forcing its closure for the 2005 and 2006 summer camp seasons. In September 2008, the Council Executive Board ratified the recommendation of the Camping Committee and the executive committee to close Treasure Island effective October 1, 2008.

=== Other facilities ===
The council no longer owns any properties in or near Philadelphia. In 1929, Henry W. Breyer, Jr., purchased the abandoned Lindenhurst property once owned by John Wanamaker in Cheltenham on York Road, below Washington Lane. Breyer donated the former Wanamaker land to the Boy Scouts of America for use as a wildlife preserve. The camp was accessible from the city by train to the Jenkintown station. Camp Henry W. Breyer (40.0853°N 75.1311°W) was sold by the Philadelphia Council in 1990 and is now the site of the Pennsylvania College of Optometry.

At one time, the Philadelphia Council was also given a tract near the Roxborough Reservoir at Port Royal Avenue and Eva Street (40.0556°N 75.2438°W). and was called the "Boy Scout Tract." This land was eventually sold and is now part of the Schuylkill Center for Environmental Education. Also, the Philadelphia council also owned Camp Biddle on the Darby Creek (Pennsylvania) in Marple Township. (39.9967°N 75.3550°W). The camp was named after Anthony J. Drexel Biddle.

The Dale Sea Scout Base was in Eddington, Bensalem Township, Pennsylvania on the Delaware River. The property was purchased from Major Charles Smith, a Philadelphia banker, and was established as Sea Scout Headquarters in 1935. It was named in honor of Commodore Edward C. Dale, who helped organize the area Sea Scouts.

== Unami Lodge, One ==
The Cradle of Liberty's Order of the Arrow Lodge, Unami Lodge, One, was where the OA began at Treasure Island Scout Reservation in 1915, and in 2015 will celebrate its 100th anniversary.

== Alumni ==
- Tommy Lasorda

== See also ==
- Scouting in Pennsylvania
