= Treasure Island Scout Reservation =

Boy Scout Camp in the Delaware River

- Location: Point Pleasant, Pennsylvania
- Country: United States
- Coordinates: 40.4725°N 75.0657°W
- Founded: 1913
- Website http://www.friendsoftreasureisland.org

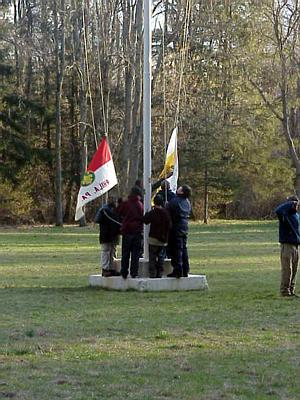
Scouts on the parade field at T.I.

Treasure Island is a former Boy Scout property located between Point Pleasant, Pennsylvania and Frenchtown, New Jersey, United States. The property is situated on two islands in the middle of the Delaware River and was owned by the Cradle of Liberty Council. Treasure Island was the second oldest continually operated Boy Scout Camp, behind Owasippe Scout Reservation in Michigan, in the country and had been continuously associated with Scouting since 1913.

In April 2005, storms caused some of the highest flooding since 1955. As a result, Treasure Island was closed to summer campers in 2005 for the first time in twenty-five years. The council spent more than $1-million to rehabilitate the camp in preparation for reopening in June 2006. On June 28, 2006, the camp was once again inundated. While its long-term future was in doubt, it opened again successfully in 2007 and 2008. However, on September 10, 2008, the Council Executive Board voted to close Treasure Island for the 2009 season, the camp remained closed for the 2010 season and is now permanently shuttered.

It was announced on March 2, 2018 that Treasure Island was sold to Haubert Outdoor Oriented Adventure Hospitality, LLC, a family-owned business that intends to re-open the historic property as a commercial family campground. Haubert, with a partnership with the Friends of Treasure Island, have made Treasure Island available to Scouts free of charge.

Since 2018 the Friends of Treasure Island non-profit group has been rehabilitating the camp facilities and now operates the camp for multiple weekends in the spring and fall.

== Structures ==
Among the important buildings on the island are the Mess Hall (the largest structure on the island), Unami Lodge, the Kiwanis Lodge (HandiCraft), the Klein Lodge (nature), the Health Lodge, the Trading Post, and "City Hall", which was the main office in control of Treasure Island. During the summer, most of the lodges were used for merit badge instruction. There is also the Goodman Stockade, where the opening campfires are held on Sunday nights, and the Ceremonial Grounds, where the Order of the Arrow ceremonies and the Friday night closing campfire were held. The stone fixtures of the Ceremonial Grounds, where the Order of the Arrow ceremonies were held, were excavated, transported, and reassembled at a new location within the Summit Bechtel Scout Reserve in West Virginia.

Treasure Island has a swimming pool, and boating was conducted in canoes, rowboats and Sunfish sailboats on the west side of the island at the Boathouse.

== Camp program ==
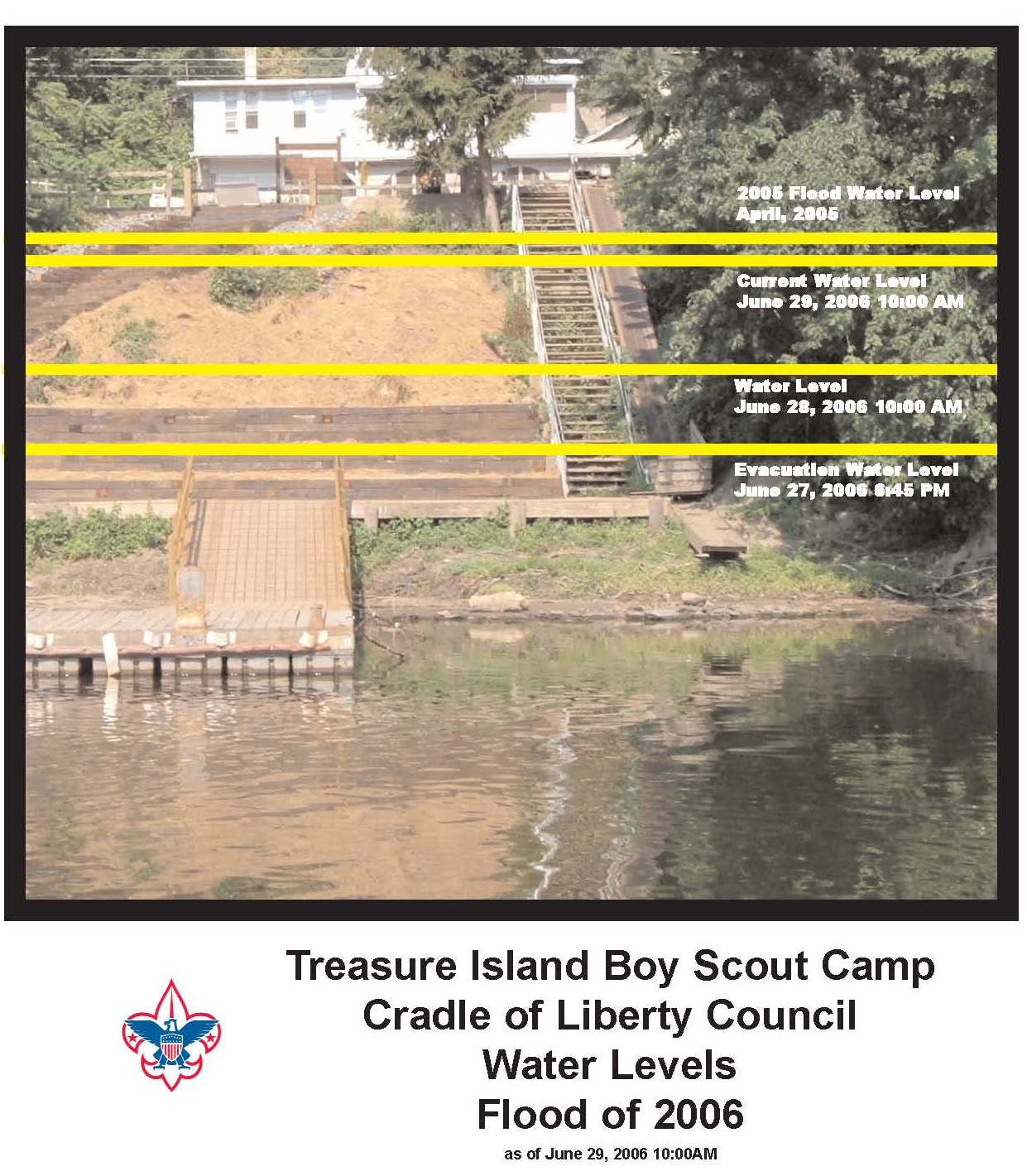
Screenshot from Council webpage

Tube rafting was offered to Scouts during the summer, and scouts floated downstream to Point Pleasant, Pennsylvania, where they were driven by bus back up to the mainland across from Treasure Island, and taken by a boat back to the island.

Bike and canoe trips in the surrounding area were also conducted along the old Delaware Division of the Pennsylvania Canal. Climbing and rappelling trips also took place at Ralph Stover State Park.

== Marshall Island ==
Just to the north of Treasure Island lies Marshall Island (also known as Eagle Island). Marshall Island is connected to Treasure Island only by a small footbridge. Treasure Island is demarcated within the New Jersey border of the Delaware River, whereas Marshall Island is within the river's Pennsylvania boundary. This distinction afforded the archery and rifle ranges for the camp to be sited on Marshall Island, as Pennsylvania state gun laws were less stringent.

There is a path leading from the archery and rifle ranges that runs north and branches off in two directions. The branch to the left leads to a series of abandoned buildings and an abandoned field, remaining from when Eagle Island operated as a separate camp (Camp Wilson) in the 1970s. The right branch leads to unused campsites and the C.O.P.E. course.

== Order of the Arrow ==
In 1915 the Order of the Arrow (OA) was founded at Treasure Island by the Camp Director, E. Urner Goodman, and Assistant Camp Director Carroll A. Edson. The W. W. W. (the original name of the OA in the Lenni Lenape language) was designed as a camp honor fraternity that would emphasize the ideals of Scouting through the use of ceremonies and American Indian lore. At the beginning of the camping season, Goodman explored the island to find a suitable site for the Council Fire and for the rituals of his new program. A natural amphitheater was chosen on the south side of the island that was secluded from the rest of the camp. On the day of the first induction campfire, July 16, 1915, Goodman and one of his staff members, Harry A. Yoder, cleared the brush for the new ceremonial grounds, built the altar, and cut a trail leading from the camp. This new ceremonial ring continued to be used for OA ceremonies and for the camp's campfire programs until Treasure Island closed. At the end of the camping season that year, the new Order contained twenty-five members who selected the totem and names for Unami Lodge.

== See also ==
- Scouting in New Jersey
- Scouting in Pennsylvania
