= Brotherhood of Andrew and Philip =

Fraternal evangelical religious organization

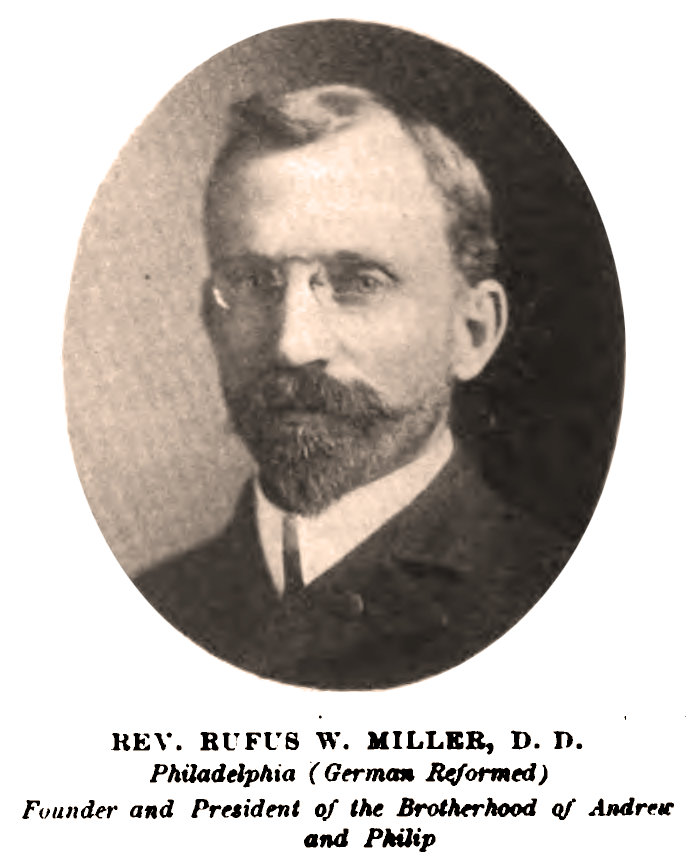
Rev. Rufus W. Miller, D.D.

Brotherhood of Andrew and Philip was a fraternal evangelical religious organization founded in 1888 by Rufus W. Miller, of Philadelphia. He became president of the organization's general council. The organization held its first federal convention in New York City in 1893. It was composed of members of 23 evangelical denominations in the United States besides chapters in Australia and Japan. Its objects were indicated in the statement that "any man can belong to the Brotherhood who will promise to pray daily for the spread of the Kingdom of Christ among men and to make an earnest effort each week to bring at least one man within the hearing of the Gospel". In 1914, the number of chapters of the Brotherhood in the United States was 875, with a total membership of 25,000 in 44 states.
