= Order of the Arrow =

Honor society of Scouting America

- Owner: Scouting America
- Age range: 11–20 (youth); 21+ (adults)
- Headquarters: Irving, Texas
- Location: United States, Puerto Rico, Japan, Germany, Philippines
- Country: United States
- Founded: July 16, 1915; 111 years ago
- Founders: E. Urner Goodman; Carroll A. Edson
- Membership: 92,834 total members (2026); 240 lodges (2026)
- National Chief: Joshua Nero
- National Vice Chief: Emma Wright
- National Chairman: Chris A. Grove
- National Director: Cortland Bolles
- Website oa-scouting.org

The Order of the Arrow (OA) is the honor society of Scouting America, composed of Scouts and Scouters who best exemplify the Scout Oath and Law in their daily lives as elected by their peers. It was founded as a camp fraternity by E. Urner Goodman, with the assistance of Carroll A. Edson, in 1915. Although it began without national approval, it was eventually admitted as an "Official Experiment" of Scouting America. In 1948, following an extensive review, it became a program of the organization.

Inducted members, known as Arrowmen (regardless of gender; as Scouting America and its programs are open to all genders), are organized into local youth-led lodges that harbor fellowship, promote camping, and render service to scout councils and their communities. Each lodge corresponds to a council in the area. Lodges are further broken down into chapters, which correspond to districts within a council. Members wear identifying insignia on their uniforms, most notably the pocket flap that represents their individual lodge and the sash worn at official OA functions. The national organization sponsors several events, awards, and training functions in addition to lodge programming.

Scouting America maintains that the Order of the Arrow is not a secret organization. It instead utilizes the “attractiveness of the unknown” in its ceremonies to create a perception of mystery among non-members. There are three membership levels, each with its own ceremony: Induction, Brotherhood, and Vigil Honor. These ceremonies are recognition of a scout's leadership qualities, camping skills, and other Scouting ideals as exemplified by their elected peers. Additionally, "safeguarded” (privy only to members and approved, legitimately interested adults) symbols and handshakes are used to impart a sense of community. Since the 1980s, concerned parents, Scout leaders, and religious leaders may review the ceremonies through a process set by the OA, and parents can refuse for their child to take part in the ceremony as membership is voluntary.

The Order of the Arrow has foundations influenced by Freemasonry and previously used imagery commonly associated with American Indian cultures for its self-invented ceremonies. Native Americans have criticized this as cultural appropriation based on non-Native stereotypes of American Indians. Its Freemason ties have also been source of debate, in spite of its systematic removal of masonic terminology in the 1930s to avoid offending religious groups.

== History ==
The Order of the Arrow was started in 1915 as a Camp Fraternity by E. Urner Goodman, newly assigned Director of Treasure Island Scout Reservation on the Delaware River and assistant Camp Director Carroll A. Edson under the name of Wimachtendienk Wingolauchsik Witahemui. It was seen as a way to improve the summer camp experience and to encourage older Scouts to continue attending the summer camp. It was not part of Scouting America at the time. The name was based on the Lenape dialect.

In 1921, the "known" lodges organized themselves under a Grand Lodge as inspired by the Freemasons. A new constitution was written and the ceremonies used in the early years were rewritten in 1921. Concern about fraternities excluding some youth was brought up the next year during the Second Biennial Conference of Scout Executives. One attendee, Dr. Tinney of Little Rock, AR stated,

I happen to be an ex-fraternity man. I have had experience where every boy in the camp is not given the opportunity - mind you I say the opportunity - to join that fraternity, which is certainly opposed to the idea of Scouting. If every man in camp is given that chance and not just a clique or coterie who call themselves together and form a fraternity, perhaps it might work advantageously.

Goodman had defended camp fraternities at the same conference and opposed a possible blanket ban on them. At the conclusion of the conference, the Order of the Arrow was adopted as an "Official Experiment" of Scouting America.

Throughout the 1930s, the Order of the Arrow went through a full review. The terminology used by the order was slowly replaced to sound less masonic and more Native American. This was a requirement from Scouting America who wished to not offend the religious groups that represented almost half of their charter organizations at the time and this needed to happen before the OA could be fully integrated into Scouting America.

By 1948, two-thirds of Scouting America's councils had OA lodges. That same year, it announced at the 1948 National Order of the Arrow Conference that the Order of the Arrow was integrated as an official part of Scouting America program.

== Membership ==
Nearly 100,000 youth and adults are members of the Order of the Arrow as of 2023. Honorary membership was once bestowed in special circumstances, as with Franklin D. Roosevelt and Dwight D. Eisenhower, but this practice was officially discontinued in 1953.

=== Youth elections ===
Registered youth members (under 21 years) of Scouting America must meet a set of requirements before they are placed on the ballot for their unit's election. They must have camped for fifteen nights (with five nights from a camping trip of at least five nights) within the last two years, must be approved by the unit leader, and must hold at least the Scouts BSA rank of First Class, Venturing rank of Discovery, or the Sea Scout rank of Ordinary. Once the requirements are met, potential youth Arrowmen are placed on their unit's ballot. The election is then held, with all youth members of the troop voting in secret for scouts who they deem worthy of membership in the OA. Units may only elect youth Scouts once per year.

Elections to the Order of the Arrow have occasionally been compared to popularity contests. The organization's chairman acknowledged in 2011 that elections were a challenge, and that steps had been taken for adult leaders to make a greater effort to convey the serious nature of OA membership to members of the troop. OA troop representatives who organize an election are asked to read the following statement to the unit:

An Order of the Arrow election is not a popularity contest. We ask you not to vote for a Scout just because they are your friend, or because they are a good athlete, or because they are older. We ask you to vote for those you believe are best at following the Scout Oath and Law.

=== Adult nominations ===
For registered adult Scouters (21 years or older) to be considered for OA membership, they must be nominated by the unit committee for approval by the lodge's adult selection committee. The number of adults nominated can be at most two-thirds of the number of youth on the ballot for that unit’s election. Similar to youth elections, units may only nominate adult Scouters once per year.

=== Membership levels ===
There are three levels of membership in the Order of the Arrow:

- Induction
- Brotherhood
- Vigil Honor

Once a scout is elected, they become a member during their Induction weekend. After six months, they become eligible to complete the Brotherhood ceremony, and following two years as a Brotherhood member, an Arrowman may be nominated for the Vigil Honor.

== Organization ==
Original emblem of Unami Lodge, the first OA lodge on a latter pocket flap patch

The Order of the Arrow places great emphasis on being a youth-led organization. Only youth under the age 21 are voting members and are eligible to hold elected offices. Professional and volunteer adults are appointed to non-voting advisory positions at the chapter, lodge, and section levels.

=== Chapters and lodges ===
The smallest level of organization in the Order of the Arrow is the chapter. The chapter is usually corresponding to a district in the local council. The chapter is led by the elected youth chapter chief, chapter vice chiefs, secretary, and a volunteer adult is appointed as the adviser, the district executive is the professional (staff) adviser. The chapters often hold monthly or weekly meetings together. The next larger unit of the OA is the lodge, which is chartered by a local Scouting America council. The lodge chief is the elected youth leader, the lodge adviser is a Scouting America adult volunteer appointed by the Scout Executive, and the lodge staff adviser is the council Scout executive or his designated council professional Scouter. The lodge youth officers, consisting of the lodge chief, one or more vice chiefs, a secretary, and a treasurer are responsible for organizing and leading the various programs and activities of the lodge. Many lodges have standing committees responsible for ceremonies, service projects, publications, unit elections, camp promotions, and dance teams composed of youth members.

=== Sections ===
Lodges are grouped into sections that are then grouped into regions. The section chief is the elected youth leader, a volunteer adult is appointed as the section adviser, and the area director (or his designate) is the professional (staff) adviser. In addition to the section chief, the section has two additional elected officers. The vice chief and secretary are elected immediately following the election of the section chief at the section's annual business meeting. All sections gather annually at a section conclave held in the late spring or early fall. It is the main duty of the section officers to lead the planning of this weekend with the help of the lodge chiefs in the section.

Like Scouting America's areas, the Order of the Arrow was formerly organized into four regions, Central, Southern, Northeast, and Western; the boundaries of each OA region correspond with the boundaries of Scouting America's areas. As of 2021, following Scouting America's restructuring of these areas, the OA changed their region boundaries, now having only two. Each region has an elected region chief, a volunteer adult who is appointed as the region chairman to oversee its region Committee, and an appointed professional (staff) adviser, forming a 'Key Three' much like the lodge and chapter system described above. Each region chief is elected by a caucus of the section chiefs from the region at the national planning meeting. Region chief elections are held the day after the election of the national chief and vice chief. The members of the region committee consist of the region chief, the region chair, all national committee members from the region, and other appointed adult volunteers. Each region annually has a gathering of all section officers and advisers. As a region, they are trained in topics relevant to their jobs. Each region also provides opportunities for Order of the Arrow members to go through a National Leadership Seminar, a weekend training course.

=== National leadership ===
The national chief and the national vice chief are selected by a caucus of the section chiefs at the outset of the Order of the Arrow's national planning meeting. At the national level, the OA is headed by the National Order of the Arrow committee, of which the national chief and national vice chief are voting members. The national adult leadership includes the volunteer chairman and the director, a professional Scouter.

== Ceremonies and symbols ==
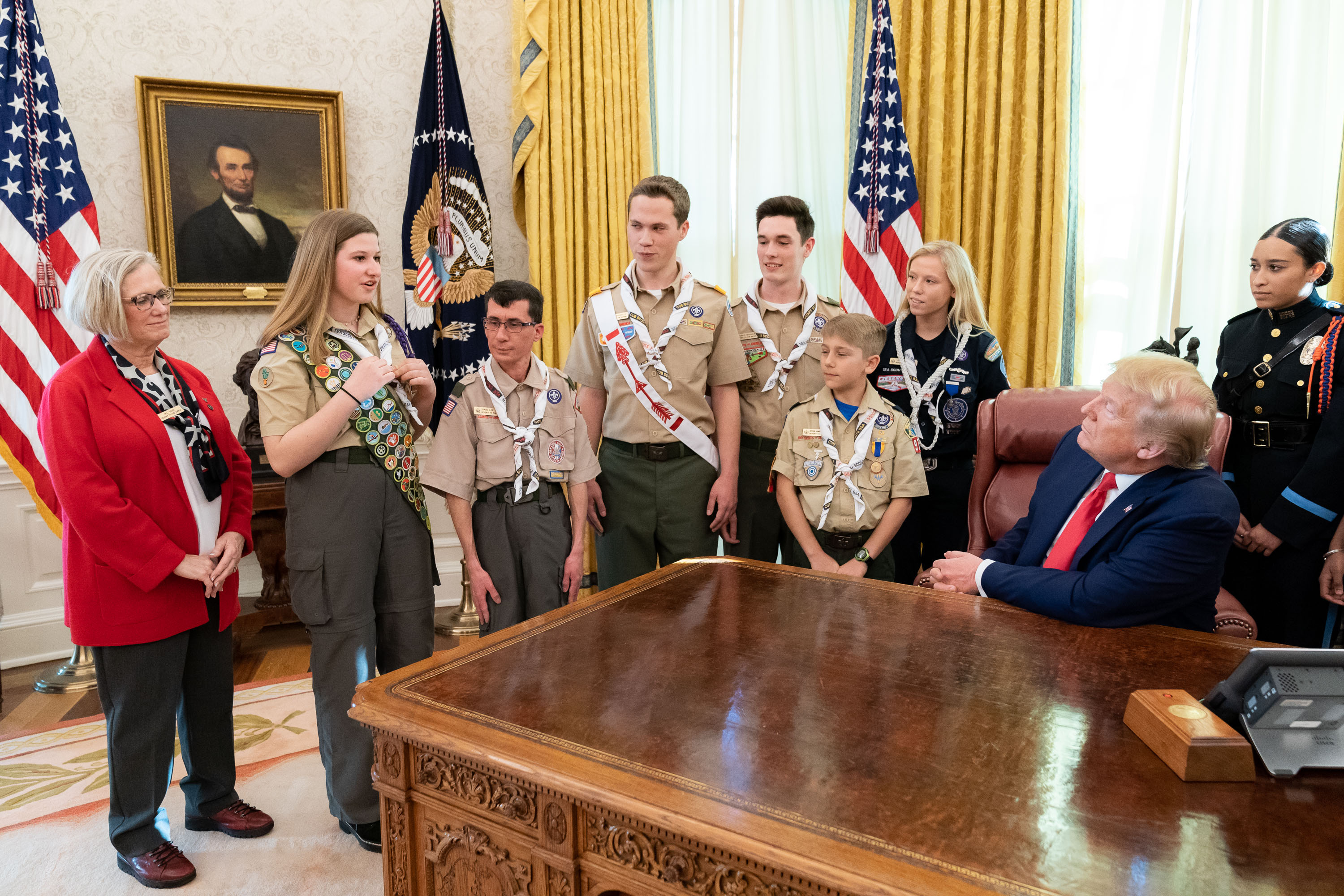
Presentation of the Annual Report to President Trump in 2020, with a Scout wearing the Vigil Honor white sash

Various symbols are used to identify members of the Order of the Arrow. Members are issued a white sash embroidered with a red arrow at the beginning of their Induction weekend. Arrowmen who achieve Brotherhood and Vigil Honor receive slightly different sashes. Additionally, each lodge produces a pocket flap to be worn by its members. It is sewn permanently to the right-hand shirt pocket while the sash is only used in formal settings.

There are four ceremonies following the election of a scout to the Order of the Arrow:

- Call-Out (public)
- Induction (safeguarded)
- Brotherhood (safeguarded)
- Vigil Honor (safeguarded)

The requirements to take part in the ceremonies are public but the content of the ceremonies is considered safeguarded and shared only with legitimately concerned adults.

Ceremonies also utilize the organization's song, commonly referred to by its first line of lyrics as "Firm Bound in Brotherhood", and titled "Order of the Arrow Official Song" and "The Order of the Arrow Song" in the printed music score of official OA publications. It was written in 1921 by OA founder E. Urner Goodman to the tune of the Russian hymn "God Save the Tsar!" composed by Alexei Lvov in 1833.

== Awards ==
Awards are separate and distinct from the membership levels of Induction and Brotherhood. Awards available through the Order of the Arrow include:

- Founder's Award
- Distinguished Service Award
- Red Arrow Award
- Triple Crown Award

== Events ==
The national OA committee also sponsors various national service opportunities, the oldest of which is the National OA Service Corps at the national Scout jamborees, at which Arrowmen have helped with many functions including shows and the Outdoor Adventure Program exhibit.

=== High Adventure ===
Two Arrowmen working on a trail in the Boundary Waters Canoe Area Wilderness.

The Order of the Arrow sponsors service groups to the four National High Adventure Bases that focus on conservation. Inspired by three gentlemen, Edward Pease, Eugene "Gene" Schnell and Marty Tschetter, who gathered at a leadership summit at Philmont Scout Ranch in 1979, the Order of the Arrow High Adventure program was established. It originally started with the Order of the Arrow Trail Crew at the Philmont Scout Ranch working to build new trails and repair old ones. This expanded to the Northern Tier National High Adventure Bases with the OA Wilderness Voyage, repairing the portage trails in the Boundary Waters Canoe Area, and then to Florida National High Adventure Sea Base in 2005 with Ocean Adventure, which works to remove invasive species on some of the Keys and promoting and carrying out of the Bleach watch program in the Florida Keys. After the addition of the third High Adventure Base, the Order of the Arrow implemented the OA Triple Crown Award in the summer of 2009, the OA began the OA Canadian Odyssey program which provided service similar to the OA Wilderness Voyage to the Quetico Provincial Park. In 2014, The Summit Bechtel Family National Scout Reserve began hosting the Order of the Arrow Summit Experience which gives service to the New River Gorge National River.

=== National Order of the Arrow Conference ===
The National Order of the Arrow Conference (NOAC) is a multi-day event which usually takes place on a university campus, bringing together thousands of delegates from OA lodges around the nation for training and activities. NOACs are held every two years, with exceptions made to align the event with significant anniversaries. As a youth-led organization, these national conferences are organized and directed by the elected section and region youth officers, who serve on committees responsible for various conference aspects under the leadership of the conference vice-chief. Events include training programs, competitions in athletics, ceremonies, and cooking, exhibits on OA history, outdoor activities, and camping. There are also opportunities to talk with national leaders, perform service work and trade patches. Evening shows have different themes, including award presentations such as the Distinguished Service Award and other entertainment.

=== Training ===
In addition to training courses available at a NOAC or section conclave, the OA offers specialized leadership training as weekend events for members: Lodge Leadership Development (LLD), National Leadership Seminars (NLS), and Developing Youth Leadership Conference (DYLC). LLD is a one-day or two-day event conducted by a lodge to train their officers and advisers. NLS's are conducted by regions for lodge officers and advisers. Many lodges send key officers to receive training. Typically, each region schedules three or four NLS weekends annually, at geographically dispersed locations within the region. DYLC is a training event for adults, usually held in conjunction with an NLS and conducted by regions, on the role of advisers in the OA.

Largely considered the adult equivalent of the NLS program, NLATS's primary objective was to provide advanced training to adults in each lodge. NLATS and NLS usually happened concurrently on the same weekend. The events were planned and executed by a staff of adults. After successful pilots in 2016, the Developing Youth Leadership Conference curriculum began replacing NLATS in early 2017.

== Use of Native American cultures ==
=== Early years ===
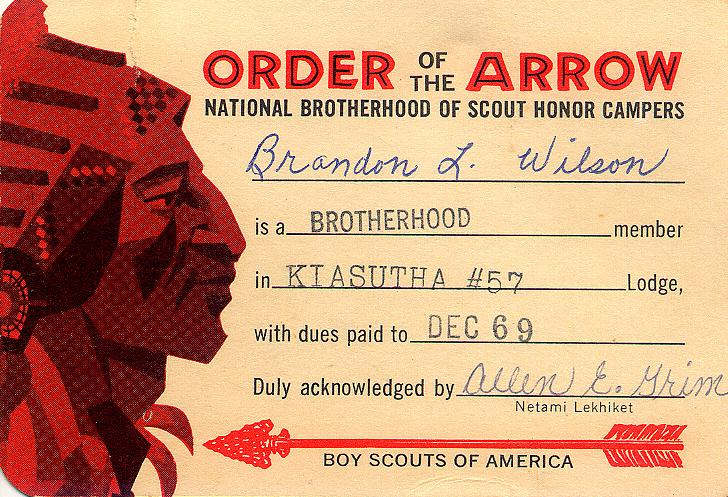
1969 Order of the Arrow Brotherhood Card featuring a drawing of a Native American Chief

Goodman and Edson, the founders of the Order of the Arrow, opted to portray what they saw as Native American characteristics "as a sign of scouting excellence", and that the imagery, costuming, titles and imitation rituals "evoked a primitivist exterior Indian Other, vanished from the modern world but still accessible through ritual and its accompanying objects." Goodman and Edson established the OA at Treasure Island Scout Reservation as a Scouting honor society "based on a loose interpretation of" Hiawatha and the novel The Last of the Mohicans. Inductions of new OA members at Treasure Island involved OA members meeting around bonfires in "ritual Indian costume".

=== Criticism ===
In the later twentieth century and beyond, the Order of the Arrow has been protested and criticized for engaging in cultural appropriation and spreading stereotypes of, and racism against, Native Americans. Protester concerns include OA's imitation of Native American ceremonies, regalia, and artwork they consider to be offensive.

The Chief Seattle Council of Scouting America has written that modern ceremonies conducted by each OA lodge are "influenced by" the history and traditions of the Native American tribes indigenous to the areas the lodge serves, but use of Native American sacred objects by non-Native groups such as the Boy Scouts has been condemned by Native activists. Mother of former Scouts Ozheebeegay Ikwe writes, "While native children in residential schools had their culture and language beaten from them, the Boy Scouts were using the language and their version of 'Indian culture' in their OA ceremony." She called the OA's use of headdresses, face paint, eagle feathers, and dancing with a pipe, "downright offensive". After researching the OA and watching their ceremonies she said, "Use of these items by Boy Scouts indicates that there is very little understanding of the Native people they claim to admire and respect." American anthropologist John H. Moore, an expert on North American Indian ethnology, wrote in an essay published in 1998 that "of all the institutions in American society, the Boy Scouts of America have probably done the most damage in miseducating the public about Native American cultures...[the] Order of the Arrow annually initiates thousands of boys into the martial, romantic version of Indian culture through ceremonies drawn from the writings of Longfellow and James Fenimoore Cooper".

David Prochaska, professor in the University of Illinois History Department states the Order of the Arrow is one element that "exemplifies the much larger phenomenon of 'playing Indian'...Boy Scouts, Eagle Scouts, Order of the Arrow. Order of Red Men. Campfire Girls. Woodcraft. Boston Tea Party. 'White Indians' – white New Agers as Native American 'wannabes.' ... To pursue the argument a step further, what is 'playing Indian,' 'playing Native,' 'playing an Other,' all about? It is about play, for one thing, in the sense of dressing up, masquerade, the Bakhtinian carnivalesque...It is also about appropriation, in the sense of taking on, assuming an other's identity, taking another's identity. The implication here is replacing one with another, silencing another, speaking for another."

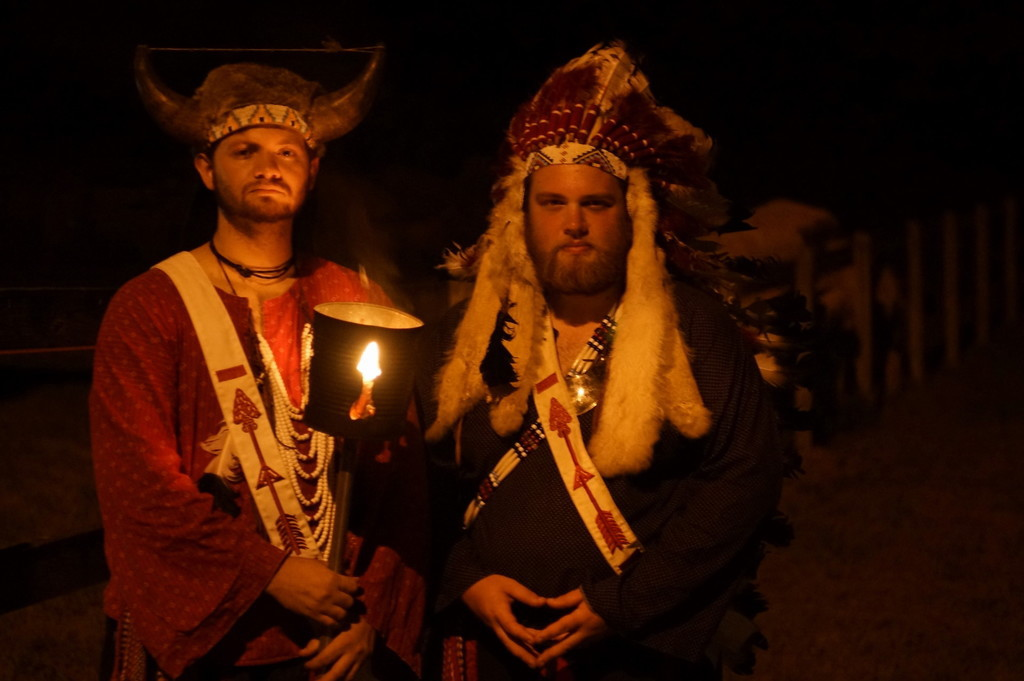
Arrowmen in Native American attire at the OA Call Out at Kia Kima Scout Reservation in July 2012

Simon Mayo-Smith, a journalist and citizen of the Oglala Lakota Nation explains the concern of using Native American Headpieces:
“The headdress is reserved for our revered elders who, through their selflessness and leadership, have earned the right to wear one. It’s a spiritual garb, not just cultural; it’s not merely an addition to one’s attire. Wearing one, even an imitation headdress, belittles what our elders have spent a lifetime to earn.”

=== Response ===
On July 23, 2018, the National Order of the Arrow Committee announced that they had received "many complaints surrounding these ceremonies from various American Indian tribes due to the manner in which they are conducted as well as the inconsistent nature in which they are performed." In 2019, the rules were changed: "Scouts will no longer be allowed to dress up as 'Indians' and incorporate Native American motifs into two of the order's more important ceremonies", according to the Voice of America, which noted also that "in spite of complaints from tribes across the country, Scouts continue to dress in 'Redface,' a term some use to describe the wearing of feathers and warpaint by non-Native Americans." In 2023, amid a backlash against stereotypes of Native Americans, Scouting America held a survey among its members about whether to eliminate or alter the rituals, including those for the OA.

On December 23, 2023, the national Order of the Arrow leadership announced: "American Indian Activities (dancing, drumming, and crafts) will not be a part of the program at the 2024 National OA Conference." And, "There is not a single entity that speaks for the 574 federally recognized tribes/Indian nations across the United States and it is impossible for us to gain consensus amongst all the tribes/Indian nations. As a result, national-level American Indian programming is not appropriate."

In 2024, the organization announced that issuance of American Indian Vigil Honor names will stop. Native American-based competitions, training and other programs will be discontinued at the section and national level in 2025. The practice will remain open at the local level until January 1, 2026. At that time, "only lodges that have a formal relationship established with a state or federally recognized tribe in their area may engage in American Indian programming." Additional guidance on this item was distributed in December 2024 and additional training will be issued throughout 2025.

With the introduction of the new Induction experience in 2026, all use of Native American imagery in the organization’s ceremonies ceased.

== Influence of Freemasonry ==
Several articles have been published since the 1990s claiming a relationship between Freemasonry and the present-day Order of the Arrow in its organization, secret ceremonies, and other rituals, including:

- Freemasonry, Scouting and the Order of the Arrow
- Following Arrows
- Yes, Virginia, it was called the 'Blood Rite' (2016)
- Freemasonry Has Infiltrated the Boy Scouts? (2008) - provides a Catholic apologist perspective
- The Order of the Arrow, Another Mason Ritual? by John R. Goodwin
- Scouting and Freemasons in Freemasons for Dummies by Christopher Hodapp

=== Acknowledgement of ties ===
The Order of the Arrow notes that some of its terminnology may have a Masonic origin: "In 1921 Wimachtendienk, W.W. (a common way at the time of referring to what we know as the Order of the Arrow) was ready to have a national structure. Patterned similar to the Freemasons, it was decided that each lodge would become a member of the Grand Lodge."

"The usage of the term “Grand Lodge” appears to have come from the Masonic fraternal system that also calls their national organization the Grand Lodge."

=== Addressing concerns from adults ===
The OA also recognizes and respects the right of any parent, Scout leader and religious leader to have questions about the OA and its safeguarded ceremonies prior to a scout joining the organization. It provides a formal process to answer these questions with the lodge adviser or his designee. If questions remain after this meeting, the adults will be permitted to read the current ceremony text used in the Induction to make an informed decision. As scouts are minors, parents have the final say to allow or disallow their child to join the organization. Some exceptions can also be granted to allow parents to attend the ceremony itself under certain conditions.
