= Professional Scouter =

Professional Scouters are paid, employees and staff of national and local Scouting organizations. The term may refer to:

- Chief Scout Executive
- Professional Scouter (Boy Scouts of America)
- Scout Commissioner
