= Jere Ratcliffe =

Chief Scout executive (1937–2015)

- Born: July 4, 1937
- Died: August 21, 2015 (aged 78); Jacksonville, Florida
- Education: Wittenberg College
- Employer: Boy Scouts of America
- Title: Chief Scout Executive
- Term: 1993–2000
- Predecessor: Ben H. Love
- Successor: Roy Williams
- Spouse: Judy Jones

Jere Brian Ratcliffe (July 4, 1937 – August 21, 2015) was a professional Scouter in the Boy Scouts of America who was the ninth Chief Scout Executive.

== Background ==
Ratcliffe was born on July 4, 1937 and grew up in Springfield, Ohio, where he met his wife, the former Judy Jones. He was awarded Eagle Scout in 1955 and as an adult was presented with the Distinguished Eagle Scout Award. After graduating from Wittenberg University in 1959, he volunteered at the Scout center of the North Florida Council in Jacksonville, Florida. He decided to make a career as a Scouting professional and attended the National Training School. His first position was as the district executive in the Blue Ridge Council of Greenville, South Carolina. He was first assigned as a scout executive in 1976, later becoming the Scout executive of the Heart of America Council in Kansas City, Missouri, where he became Chief Soaring Lone Eagle of the Tribe of Mic-O-Say. Prior to his selection as Chief Scout Executive, he was director of the BSA's Central Region, headquartered in Naperville, Illinois.

Ratcliffe also served as Scout Executive for the former Birmingham (AL) Area Council, circa late 1970s; that council merged with two other councils in the 1990s to form the Central Alabama Council.

== As Chief Scout Executive ==
On February 1, 1993, Ratcliffe accepted the position of the Chief Scout Executive of the Boy Scouts of America (BSA). In March 1998, he met in Japan with leaders of the Boy Scouts of Japan to start an exchange program with the BSA. While there, he presented Japanese Prime Minister Ryutaro Hashimoto with the BSA's Silver World Award. Ratcliffe said Scouting, "is one of the few programs that still focuses on values, and values seem to be a quality many of our young people lack today".

In October 1998 he received the Order of the Arrow Distinguished Service Award. The year before, in April 1997, Ratcliffe was arrested at Miami International Airport when the security scan showed he had inadvertently left a handgun in his luggage.

During his tenure, Ratcliffe created the Nationally Coordinated Endowment Emphasis to increase the level of endowment giving to local councils. He also created the James E. West Fellowship, the 1910 Society, and the Founders Circle to focus on endowments. These efforts effectively doubled local council endowments and allowed National to direct funds to major improvements in the high-adventure bases. Under Ratcliffe's administration, the Operation First Class program, now known as Scoutreach, was introduced to provide training and develop the resources necessary to serve at-risk youth in urban and rural areas.

== Retirement and later years ==
Ratcliffe received a retirement benefit of $2.6 million when he retired in May 2000. He received an honorary doctor of humane letters degree from Wittenberg in 2004. Ratcliffe lived in Southlake, Texas, and served on the coordinating committees of the World Organization of the Scout Movement and the World Foundation. Ratcliffe died on August 21, 2015, at the age of 78.

Boy Scouts of America
Preceded by Ben H. Love	Chief Scout Executive; 1993-2000	Succeeded by Roy Williams
