= Robert J. Mazzuca =

Former Chief Scout Executive of the Boy Scouts of America

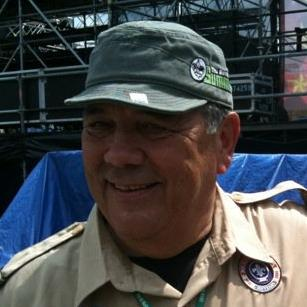
- Mazzuca at the 2010 National Scout Jamboree in Fort A.P. Hill, Virginia
- Born: 1947 (age 78–79); San Juan Bautista, California, U.S.
- Education: California Polytechnic State University
- Employer: Boy Scouts of America
- Title: Chief Scout Executive
- Term: 2007 – August 31, 2012
- Predecessor: Roy Williams
- Successor: Wayne Brock
- Spouse: Nanette Mazzuca

Robert J. "Bob" Mazzuca (/məˈzuːkə/; born 1947) is a retired professional Scouter and was the 11th Chief Scout Executive of Scouting America (then called the Boy Scouts of America). His term started in 2007, and he retired on August 31, 2012.

== Early life and family ==
Robert Mazzuca was born in 1947 in San Juan Bautista, California. As a boy, Mazzuca joined Boy Scout Troop 28 (now 428) and earned the rank of Eagle Scout in 1964. While a Scout he attended Pico Blanco Scout Reservation of the Monterey Bay Area Council for four summers, including two as staff. Mazzuca was inducted into the Order of the Arrow as a member of Esselen Lodge.

In 1970, Mazzuca received a Bachelor of Arts degree in history from California Polytechnic State University in San Luis Obispo, California.

== Scouting career ==
Mazzuca began his Scouting professional career in 1971 in Modesto, California as a district executive and as an Exploring executive. He became the Exploring director in Sacramento in 1975 and rose to the positions of field director and the director of field service.

In 1983, Mazzuca became the Scout executive in Stockton, California. He later served as an area director in the Western Region before returning to Sacramento as the Scout executive. In 1992 he became the assistant regional director for the Southern Region and in 1995 he became the Scout executive of the Greater Pittsburgh Council.

In 2005, he became the national director of the development group at the National Council and in 2006 became the assistant Chief Scout Executive. Mazzuca succeeded Roy Williams as Chief Scout Executive on September 1, 2007.

Mazzuca is a lifetime member of the National Catholic Committee on Scouting. In July 2008 Mazzuca became an honorary chieftain in the Tribe of Mic-O-Say at H. Roe Bartle Scout Reservation. In 2009 Mazzuca was presented the Distinguished Eagle Scout Award.

As Chief Scout Executive of the Boy Scouts of America, Robert Mazzuca received $1,211,572 salary/compensation from the charity. This is the 4th most money given by any charity to the head of the charity, according to CharityWatch.

Upon his retirement at the end of August 2012, Mazzuca was succeeded by Wayne Brock, previously the BSA's Deputy Chief Scout Executive/Chief Operating Officer.

== Honors and awards ==
Mazzuca is the fifth Chief Scout Executive to serve as a Chieftain in the Tribe of Mic-O-Say. He is also a 2009 recipient of the Order of the Arrow's Distinguished Service Award.

The campfire bowl at Camp Pico Blanco was rebuilt in 2011 and named the Mazzuca Campfire Bowl in his honor. Mazzuca attended the dedication ceremony.

== See also ==
Boy Scouts of America
Preceded by Roy Williams	Chief Scout Executive; 2007-2012	Succeeded by Wayne Brock
