= Roger Mosby =

14th Chief Scout Executive

Roger C. Mosby
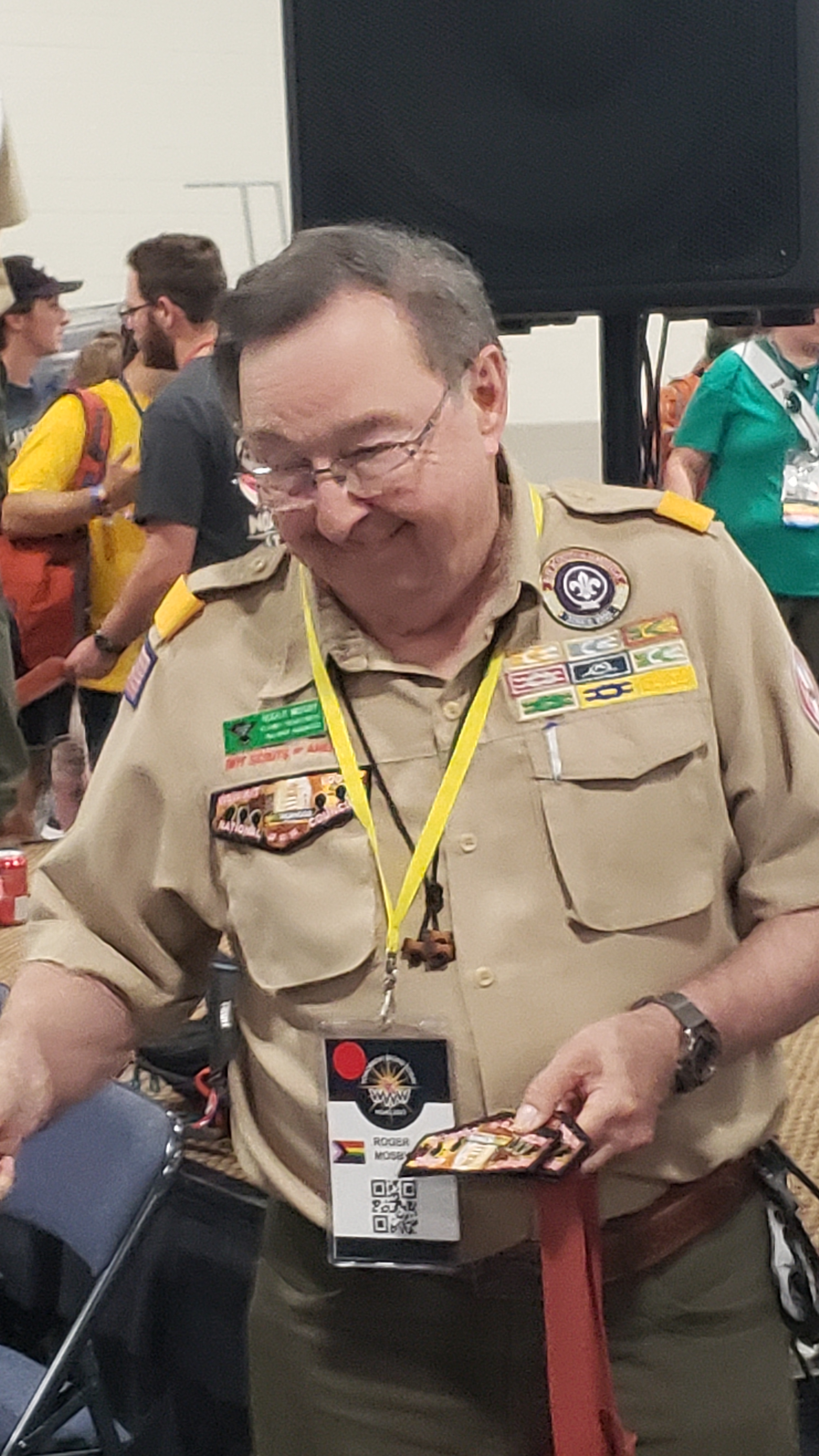
- Mosby in 2022

14th Chief Scout Executive
- In office December 29, 2019 – November 8, 2023
- Preceded by: Michael B. Surbaugh
- Succeeded by: Roger Krone

Personal details
- Born: 1947 (age 78–79) Cape Girardeau, Missouri, US
- Education: Southeast Missouri State University

Roger C. Mosby is the former president, CEO, and 14th chief scout executive of the Boy Scouts of America (BSA). He was previously vice president of human resources for Kinder Morgan. Born in Cape Girardeau, Missouri, his parents and family moved to Union County, Illinois, where he attended elementary and high school. He graduated from Shawnee High School in Wolf Lake, Illinois, going on to Southeast Missouri State University earning a Bachelor of Science in 1973. He was succeeded by Roger Krone, the former CEO of Leidos, on November 8, 2023, months after announcing his intent to retire.

== Background ==
Bucking practice, the Boy Scouts of America selected Mosby, not a professional Scouter, as their president and CEO. He did not bear the title of chief scout executive initially as that title is reserved for commissioned professional Scouters with specific training. At the National Executive Board meeting in May 2021, the board commissioned Mosby, designating him as the 14th chief scout executive of the Boy Scouts of America. Though not a Scouting professional, Mosby was a youth member in the Southeast Missouri Council (Cape Girardeau, Missouri) and Egyptian Council (Union County, Illinois), a long-time volunteer in the Mid-America and Sam Houston Area councils. Mosby has also worked at the regional and national levels of the BSA. He has also volunteered with the World Organization of the Scout Movement.

Before his selection as president and CEO, he ran his own consulting firm after retiring as an energy industry executive.

== Awards ==
Mosby has been recognized with the following awards: Bronze Wolf Award (the highest award in World Scouting), Silver Beaver Award, Silver Antelope Award, the St. George Emblem of the National Catholic Committee on Scouting, and the Vigil Honor of the Order of the Arrow.

Boy Scouts of America
Preceded by Michael Surbaugh	Chief Scout Executive; 2019-present	Incumbent
