= Ben H. Love =

Chief Scout Executive of the Boy Scouts of America

- Born: September 26, 1930; Trenton, Tennessee, U.S.
- Died: July 31, 2010 (aged 79); Cedar Park, Texas, U.S.
- Education: Lambuth College
- Employer: Boy Scouts of America
- Title: Chief Scout Executive
- Term: 1985–1993
- Predecessor: James L. Tarr
- Successor: Jere Ratcliffe
- Spouse: Annie (Ann) Hugo

Ben H. Love (September 26, 1930 – July 31, 2010) was the eighth Chief Scout Executive of the Boy Scouts of America serving from 1985 to 1993. Love graduated from Peabody High School and Lambuth College. He served in the U.S. Army during the Korean War and attained the rank of sergeant. Love died on July 31, 2010, at his home in Cedar Park, Texas due to lung cancer.

== Scouting career ==
Love became a District Executive for the West Tennessee Area Council in 1955, and in 1960 he became Scout Executive of the Delta Area Council. In 1968, Ben was named Scout Executive of the Longhorn Council in Fort Worth, Texas and it was during his tenure that the Sid Richardson Scout Ranch was constructed. In 1971, he was named Scout Executive at the Sam Houston Area Council. Prior to becoming Chief Scout Executive in 1985, Love served as director of the Northeast Region from 1973 to 1985 and lived in Princeton Junction, New Jersey. When he took office there were approximately 4.7 million members of the BSA.

== Chief Scout Executive ==
As Chief Scout Executive Love introduced the BSA campaign against the five "unacceptables": hunger, illicit drugs, child abuse, youth unemployment and illiteracy. The BSA also developed coeducational "Career Awareness" Exploring during his tenure years.

It was Love's leadership during his tenure as Chief Scout Executive in defending the BSA during the Curran Case, the Randall case and later the Dale case that charted the course for the Boy Scouts eventual legal victories, but loss of public support. His attitude at the time is evidenced by his quote, "A homosexual is not the role model I would want as the leader of my son's troop - and neither is an atheist." The organization ultimately abandoned Love's failed policy of discrimination against gay youth and adults after loss of membership and financial support.

== Honors and awards ==
- Lambuth College - Doctorate in Humanities
- Pepperdine University - Doctorate of Philanthropy
- Montclair State College - Doctorate of Humane Letters
- Bronze Wolf Award
- National Presbyterian Church's God and Service Award
- Baden-Powell Scout Award
- Vigil Honor of the Order of the Arrow
- Three beads - Wood Badge

== See also ==
- Learning for Life

Boy Scouts of America
Preceded by James L. Tarr	Chief Scout Executive; 1985–1993	Succeeded by Jere Ratcliffe
