= COPE (Boy Scouts of America) =

Outdoor team building activity

Project COPE
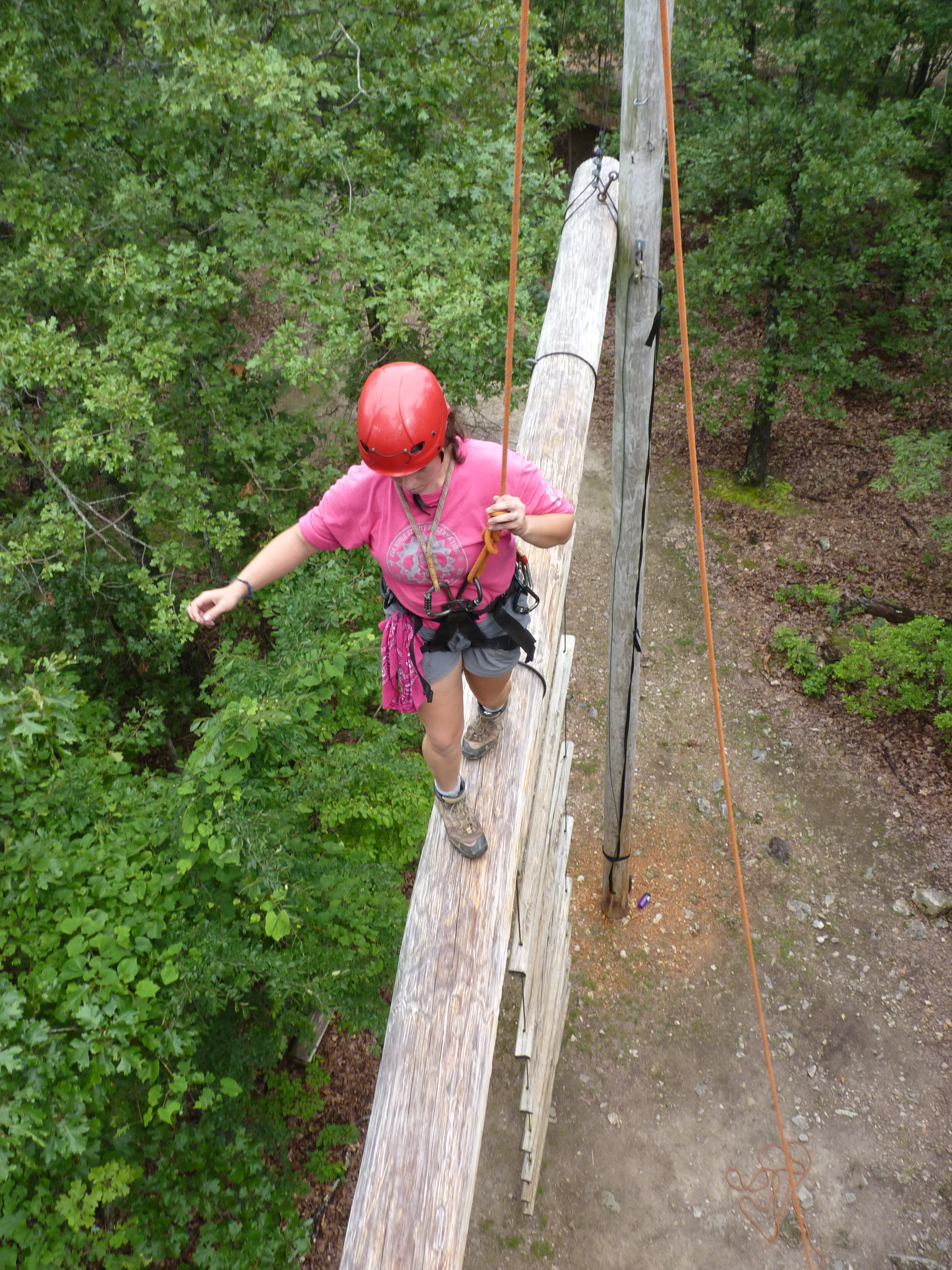
- A Venturer traverses a COPE High Ropes course
- Country: United States
- Founded: 1980

Project COPE, which stands for Challenging Outdoor Personal Experience, is a program in the Boy Scouts of America that consists of tests to develop strength, agility, coordination, reasoning, mutual trust, and group problem-solving. Founded in 1980, by 1991 there were 200 COPE courses offered across the United States. During non-summer camp months, Project COPE courses have been made available to high schools, and to private groups for team building. The project has also been part of at least one program to reduce recidivism among nonviolent juvenile offenders.

Group trust events that are part of Project COPE include standing on an elevated platform or tree stump and falling backwards to be caught by a human zipper. In another exercise designed to show the importance of leadership, teams are blindfolded as they navigate through the woods, with only the people at the very front and back of the line allowed to speak. Participants progress from simple group games to low- and high-course rope activities. There are no time limits.

== History ==
According to the U.S. Scouting Service Project, C.O.P.E. originated in St. Joseph, Missouri, as a program at Camp Geiger in the late 1970s, under the leadership of Parvin Bishop of the Pony Express Council.

After seeing challenge courses such as the Dalajamb World Jamboree International Encampment in Sweden, which offered a woodland pioneering course complete with zip lines and bridges, the National Council of the Boy Scouts of America was interested in offering similar programs nationwide. The first Project COPE took place in 1980. Following a three-year pilot in Missouri, the council recommended Project COPE as an optional project across the country, and tested it across six locations.

Among other benefits, Project COPE was viewed as a way to keep older Scouts engaged with Scouting as they grew older. The program also helped to popularize Scouting among the wider public.

== See also ==
- Ropes course
