= Roy Williams (Scouting) =

Chief Scout Executive of the Boy Scouts of America

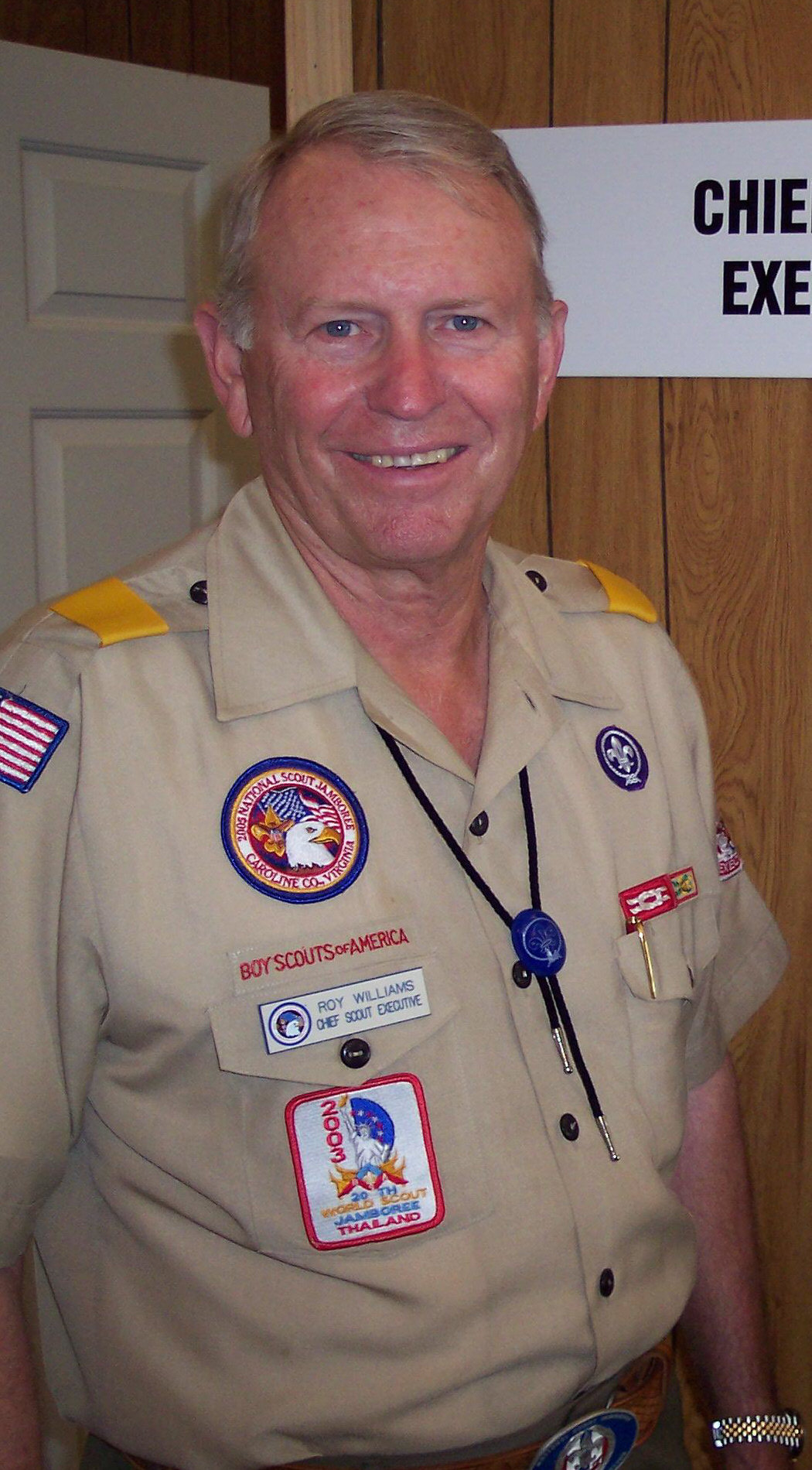
- Roy Williams at the 2005 National Scout Jamboree
- Born: 1944 (age 81–82)
- Education: University of Texas at Arlington
- Employer: Boy Scouts of America
- Title: Chief Scout Executive
- Term: 2000–2007
- Predecessor: Jere Ratcliffe
- Successor: Robert J. Mazzuca

Roy Williams (born 1944) is the former Chief Scout Executive of the Boy Scouts of America. He is the tenth person to hold that position, serving between 2000–2007.

== Scouting career ==
Selected in the spring of 2000 as Chief Scout Executive, Roy Williams began his career with the Boy Scouts of America as a district executive in Fort Worth, Texas. Following that, Williams served as district executive in Abilene, Texas, finance director in Little Rock, Arkansas, Scout Executive for the Jayhawk Area Council in Topeka, Kansas, and later the Narragansett Council in Providence, Rhode Island. He has also served as director of the Boy Scout Division, BSA National Council and most recently, Western region director.

Williams' term as Chief Scout Executive was a very challenging time for the Boy Scouts of America. Shortly after Williams assumed the duties of Chief Scout Executive in 2000, the U.S. Supreme Court announced its ruling in the Boy Scouts of America v. Dale case, where the right of the Boy Scouts to exclude known and avowed homosexuals from its membership was upheld. Although initially seen as a major win for the BSA, this decision led to funding issues with several United Way chapters, government entities and more limited recruiting access to schools.

Membership in the BSA's traditional programs (Boy Scouting, Cub Scouting and Venturing) steadily declined during Williams' tenure. Several Councils, most notably the councils in Dallas, Texas, Atlanta, Georgia and Birmingham, Alabama were embroiled in charges of false membership claims.

Williams announced his retirement on February 7, 2007, which was effective September 1, 2007. His successor, Robert J. Mazzuca, was named on May 22, 2007.

Williams graduated in 1971 from the University of Texas at Arlington with a bachelor's degree in business administration. He is a veteran of the United States Air Force. Williams was a Scout while a youth in Dallas, Texas.

== Honors and awards ==
Williams is a Chieftain in the Tribe of Mic-O-Say and a Vigil Honor member of the Order of the Arrow. He is a recipient of the Order's Distinguished Service Award

The Nonprofit Times, a publication covering the field of nonprofit management, named Williams as one of the nation's top 50 outstanding leaders of nonprofit organizations for 2005.

== Footnotes ==
1. (September 2005). Business publication names BSA Chief Scout Executive Roy Williams one of 50 top leaders of nonprofit organizations. Scouting Magazine.

== See also ==
Boy Scouts of America
Preceded by Jere Ratcliffe	Chief Scout Executive; 2000-2007	Succeeded by Robert J. Mazzuca
