= Roger Krone =

Chief executive of Scouting America

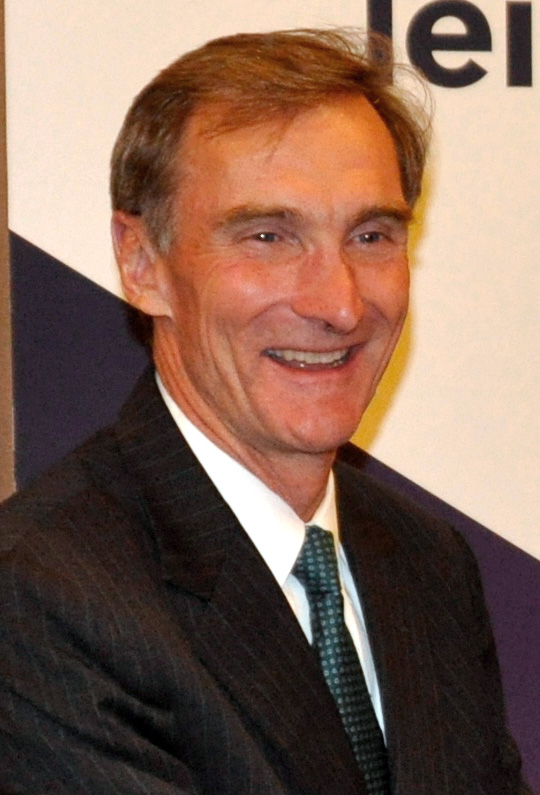
- Krone in 2014

15th Chief Scout Executive
- Incumbent
- Assumed office November 8, 2023
- Preceded by: Roger Mosby

Personal details
- Born: July 25, 1956 (age 70)
- Education: Georgia Institute of Technology (BS); University of Texas at Arlington (MS); Harvard University (MBA)
- Occupation: Business executive

Roger A. Krone (born July 25, 1956) is an American business executive who is the 15th Chief Scout Executive of Scouting America. He previously was the CEO of Leidos from 2014 to 2023. A pilot and aerospace engineer, Krone worked for 45 years in the aerospace industry, holding senior program management and finance positions at Boeing, McDonnell Douglas, and General Dynamics.

== Education ==
A native of Cincinnati, Krone earned a bachelor's degree in aerospace engineering from the Georgia Institute of Technology, where he also became interested in flying airplanes. In 1981, Krone earned a master's degree in aerospace engineering from the University of Texas at Arlington and in 1986 an MBA from Harvard Business School.

== Career ==
In 1978, Krone joined General Dynamics, where he worked in engineering, program management, and finance. From 1984 to 1986, he attended Harvard Business School, where he earned a Master of Business Administration degree. In 1992, Krone joined McDonnell Douglas, where he worked as director of financial planning and became vice president and treasurer of the company. When McDonnell Douglas merged with Boeing in 1997, Krone became a Boeing employee. In 2008, he became the president of Boeing's Network and Space Systems division, leading about 15,000 employees in 35 states.

On July 14, 2014, Krone joined Leidos as CEO.

In November 2023, Krone was selected as president and CEO of Boy Scouts of America, the first new CEO after the organization had emerged from bankruptcy in the wake of the $2.46 billion trust fund set aside for victims of Boy Scouts of America sex abuse cases. One of his first initiatives as CEO was to preside over the rebranding of BSA as Scouting America in recognition of the more than 176,000 girls and young women active in the program having been opened to both genders in 2017.

== Awards ==
Krone earned his Eagle Scout award in 1973.

In 2021, he was elected to the National Academy of Engineering for contributions in Aerospace and Electronics, Communication & Information Systems.
