= Tribe of Mic-O-Say =

Honor society for American scouts

- Location: St. Joseph, Missouri
- Country: United States
- Founded: June 1925 at Camp Brinton
- Founder: Harold Roe Bartle
- Website: Camp Geiger Micosay; Bartle Reservation Micosay

The Tribe of Mic-O-Say is an honor society used by two local councils of Scouting America, the Pony Express Council at Camp Geiger Reservation, and the Heart of America Council at the H. Roe Bartle Scout Reservation. Similar programs exist or have existed in multiple other councils as well. The Tribe of Mic-O-Say is not a program of the National Council of the BSA. Both councils use both the Tribe of Mic-O-Say and the Order of the Arrow.

The Kansas City Chiefs NFL team adopted the Chiefs name to recognize the role Bartle played, while he was mayor, to bring the team to Kansas City. The Chiefs have been widely criticized for cultural appropriation of native tribes.

== History ==
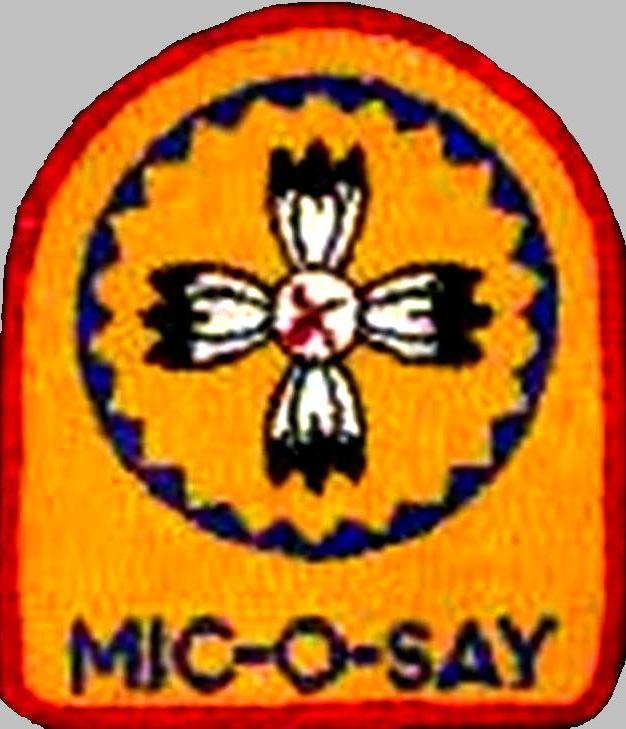
Tribe of Micosay

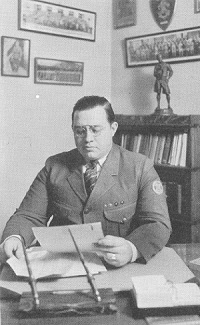
Harold Roe Bartle c. 1925, Scout Executive of the St. Joseph Area Council

Micosay was founded in 1925 at Camp Brinton near Agency, Missouri under the guidance of Harold Roe Bartle, who was the Scout executive of the St. Joseph Council, now Pony Express Council. Bartle combined his experiences in Wyoming with the St. Joseph Council's existing honor organization called Manhawka.

Bartle arrived at Wind River in 1922 to serve as Scout Executive, having first stopped in Kansas City for training in 1921. He spent time on the Wind River Indian Reservation and formed a close friendship with Lone Bear, son of the late Northern Arapaho Chief Lone Bear, who had been educated at the Carlisle Institute.

Bartle convened a meeting with Lone Bear and two other friends, a Shoshone and a Lakota, to find a name for his honor camper concept. The word "Micosay," described as meaning deep and everlasting friendship, was given to him at that meeting and became the foundation of the Tribe of Mic-O-Say. Heart of America Council

A critical caveat: the Missouri Valley Special Collections history of Bartle notes numerous biographical discrepancies and flags that an obituary shows the original Chief Lone Bear died in November 1920, before Bartle arrived in Wyoming. Alternate accounts shift the relationship to the chief's son. Bartle's claim to have been "inducted as a blood brother" into the Northern Arapaho Tribe has also been noted as inconsistent with how tribes actually recognize membership, and his adoption of "Chief" as a personal identity has since been characterized as cultural appropriation. KC History

Bartle was inspired to create the organization after serving as the Scout Executive for the Cheyenne Council of the Boy Scouts of America in Casper, Wyoming, from 1923 to 1925. Bartle became interested in the heritage and culture of the many Indian reservations in Wyoming. He spent many hours listening to stories about the Indian tribes and soon began to incorporate Indian values and ideals into his Scouting program. Bartle claimed he was inducted into a local tribe of Arapaho based on a reservation served by the Scout council, and according to traditional Micosay legend, was given the name Lone Bear by the Chief.

Bartle started as Scout Executive in St. Joseph, January 1925. The idea of Micosay was well formed from the moment he arrived. There already existed a camp society there called Manhawka, established by a previous executive. Bartle familiarized himself with the rudiments of it, and incorporated them into his central theme of an Indian-like society based on the principles of the Scout Oath. Bartle named the society "Micosay". A hyphenated version was used shortly after and remains popular, though the non-hyphenated version can still be used.

Camp Geiger, which succeeded Camp Brinton in 1935, is considered the mother Tribe of Micosay. Bartle was "The Chief", and conducted all the early ceremonies personally, placing a single eagle claw around the neck of each new member and bestowing their Tribal Name upon them. He built up the tribe during the next few years.

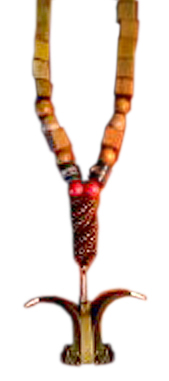
Claws worn by Pony Express Council tribesmen

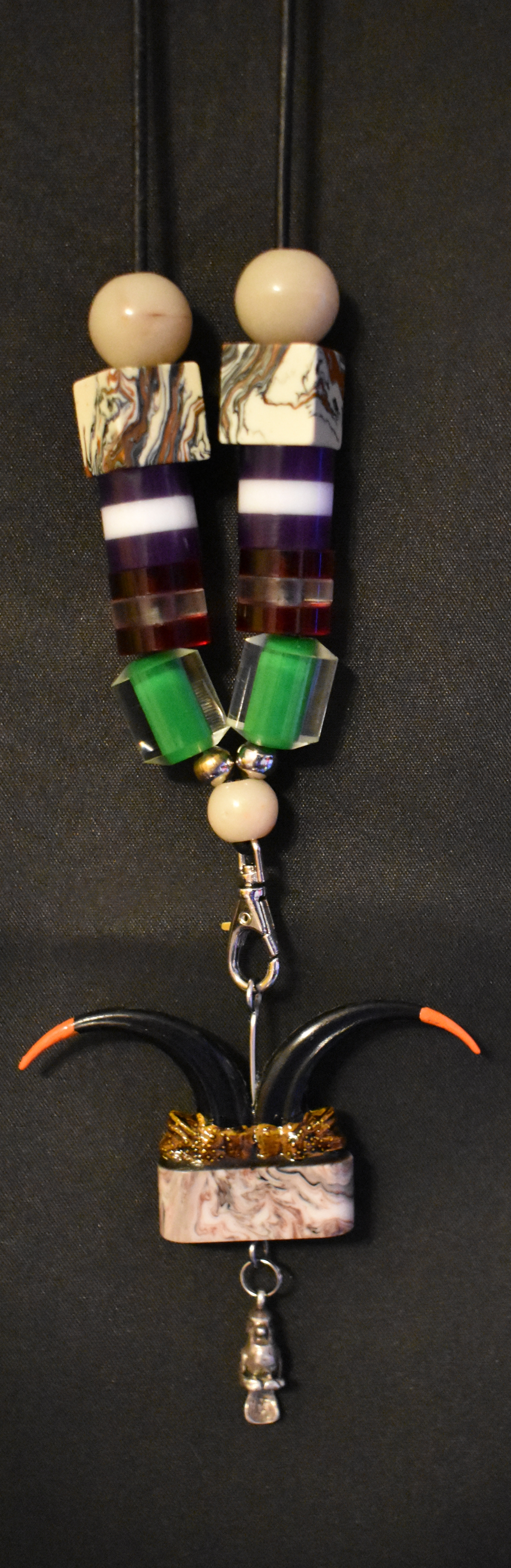
Claws worn by Heart of America Council tribesmen

In late 1928, Bartle became the Scout executive of the Kansas City Area Council. Micosay had increased both Scouting and summer camp attendance, and he established another Micosay program at Camp Dan Sayre near Noel, Missouri, in 1929, the first summer there. Another honor program known as the 4Ms existed there at the time. In 1930 Camp Osceola opened near Osceola, Missouri, and was renamed the H. Roe Bartle Scout Reservation.

== Organization ==
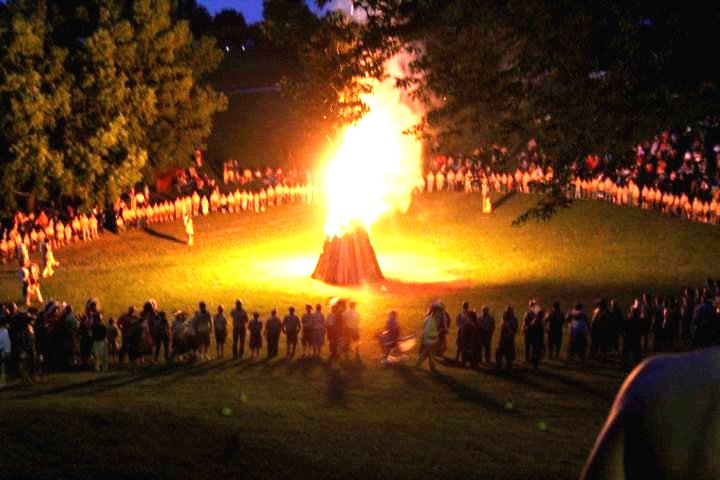
Tapping Ceremony of the Pony Express Council

Members of Mic-O-Say are divided into two ranks, "braves" and "warriors." Leaders of the organization are given titles such as "shaman, sachem, keeper of the wampum, sagamore and medicine man."

In the Heart of America Council, the Council of Chieftains, She-She-Be Council, and Tribal Council lead the tribe. Their official publications are the Customs and Traditions booklet, Cedar Smoke newsletter, and Inner Circle magazines.

In the Pony Express Council, the Council of Chieftains and the Tribal Council lead the tribe. Their official publications are the Redbook and most recently Make Talk Now which is an electronic video version of the former Make Talk magazine.

The Pony Express Council hosts nine dance troupes who imitate Native Americans culture by having Scouts perform non-sacred native style dances throughout Missouri. Scouts construct native attire, learn dances, learn chants, and imitate native Americans with dances that are stylized similar to native dances. All dances are the tribes own interpretation of the native dances. At Bartle this is performed by the MicOSay dancers who are led by local tribal members.

== Notable members ==
- Harold Roe Bartle, former Mayor of Kansas City
- Sam Graves, U.S. Congressman from Missouri's 6th Congressional District, having achieved the rank of Runner as a youth and elevated in 2009 to Sachem at Camp Geiger.
- Todd Graves, former US Attorney, was elevated in June 2016 to Chieftain at Camp Geiger having served in all ranks and paint stations.
- Arliss Howard, actor playing Private Cowboy in Full Metal Jacket, wearing his Brave Pouch in various scenes
- Ike Skelton, former U.S. Congressman from Missouri's 4th congressional district, 34 year member of the United States House of Representatives, and former Chair of the House Armed Services Committee
- Michael B. Surbaugh was an Honorary Chief from 2016
- Roy Williams, Chief Scout Executive of BSA from 2000 to 2007
- William Least Heat-Moon, travel writer; his pen name is his Mic-O-Say tribal name

== Controversy ==
The Boy Scouts of America, and particularly Micosay, have been widely criticized by officials of several Native tribes, anthropologists, journalists, and professors for being a patently offensive cultural appropriation of tribal identity and sacred practices. It was called "a fake Indian Boy Scout tribe" for people who want to "play Indian". Robert Prue, a former scout and a professor of social work at the University of Missouri-Kansas City, doubts some of Harold Roe Bartle's historical origin claims, and rejects his claim of having become a tribal member in Wyoming, as being merely the affinity of one tribal member instead of the requisite authority of each entire tribe being depicted. Critics say that the appropriation continues because the BSA has not yet received widespread public revulsion like professional sports teams have. That includes the Kansas City Chiefs, named after Bartle's nickname from the founding of Micosay, and which has its own cultural appropriation and racism controversy.

In 2015, representatives of several native tribes from the American Indian Health Research and Education Alliance met with Micosay leadership and published a five-page article in Practicing Anthropology called "For $1,000 You Can Be a Dog Soldier: The Tribe of Should-be-Ashamed". It summarized: "The Micosay have a long history of misappropriating and misrepresenting Indian culture and traditions as well as engaging in cultural imperialism. This alienates Native people from their traditions, undermines self-determination, and creates further animosity and distrust between Natives and non-Natives."

There are presently over 500 federally recognized American Indian tribes, each with their own customs and traditions. This diversity makes it next to impossible to get unanimous agreement from all tribes. Micosay has worked with American Indian advisors and throughout the years many American Indian youth and adults have joined Micosay. According to the Micosay Parent's Guide, the Arapaho tribe also presented their flag to camp Bartle as a symbol of their relationship with Micosay. Camp Geiger also requires scouts to gain a better appreciation for American Indian cultures by earning the Indian Lore merit badge (now known as Native American Cultures merit badge starting January 2026), learning how to do bead-work and to hand make various clothing and costume items in order to advance within the program. Micosay does not use any American Indian religious ceremonies; all Micosay ceremonies were developed specifically for the program.

== Ceremonies ==
Micosay has several induction ceremonies. Some are public, some are for members.

Scouts BSA's official policy towards "Secrets in Scouting" is:

"All aspects of the Scouting program are open to observation by parents and leaders. The BSA does not recognize any secret organizations as part of its program. Hazing and initiations are prohibited and have no part during any Scouting activity."

Parents who are Scout leaders may be inducted into the tribe of Micosay, along with the youth.

There are a couple ways to become a member and they are slightly different between Bartle and Geiger.

For both camps, Adults may join upon nomination of another member. There are some general requirement such as being a registered member of Scouting America. Both Geiger and Bartle have a form that is submitted by the unit, typically by an existing member of the tribal council and signed by the Committee Chairman. This form is reviewed by a committee and if the individual is deemed worthy (Typically a formality) they will enter the tribe as an "Honorary Warrior". They will participate in the indiction ceremony. During the induction ceremony, at Bartle they will be called to the circle. a Medicine Man will perform from a script, and the group of all prospective Honorary Warriors will be sent to learn about the Tribe over the next 3 days. At Geiger it's a bit different. The adults are "Tapped". They will learn about the tribe over the next 48 hours. Many of the milestones are similar amongst the tribesman at both camps, but in both cases Adults are lead and asked to affirm their commitment to developing scouts and helping the scouts achieve Eagle Rank.

For youth, it works a bit differently.

At Bartle, there is a call night. This is open to the public, typically around the 5th day of camp. All scouts are assembled in the council ring. Scouts who are eligible sit in the first couple rows, while other tribesman who are attending sit behind them. Scouts are typically nominated by other tribesmen from their troop but generally speaking the scouts are First Class rank or higher; Star is preferred, 14 years of age is preferred. Exceptions are made when appropriate, and nobody ever quite knows who will be called when.

At Geiger there is a Tapping night. This is open to the public every Thursday at Camp. All of the scouts gather around a large fire. A runner will run down the hill with a torch in one hand and a tomahawk in the other hand. Scouts are nominated for the tribe by another tribesman holding their hands over the scout. The scout cannot see that they were nominated. The runner stops in front of the scout and "taps" the tomahawk on the chest of each scout. For reference it's above the breast, below the shoulder, and it's appropriate for both male and female scouts. It does not hurt, the force is no more than a high five. Scouts are then instructed to line up together. Scouts are asked if they want to consent to participate. Occasionally a scout declines. They will be given the option again in a more private setting and for those who decline, it's not a blacklist or smear against their name, nor are they excliuded from membership the following year.

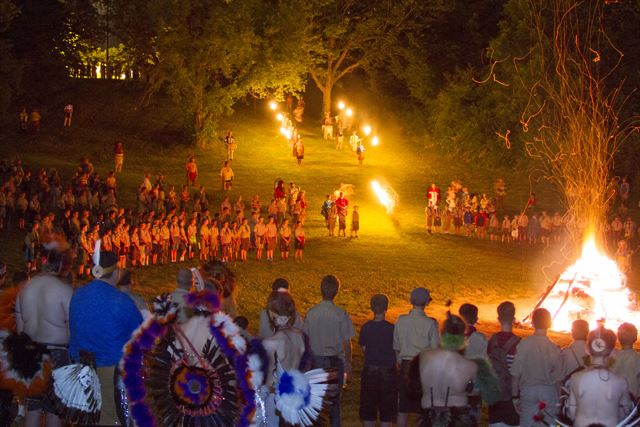
Geiger Tapping Ceremony

At both camps, the scouts will return to their camp, collect their sleeping bag, pillow, and other supplies as they will camp together somewhere else at the camp. They will then participate in a group and private ceremony before they go to bed for the evening.

At both camps, when a scout is selected to become a member of the tribe they are first known as a Foxman. They are not yet members of the tribe but they are participating in ceremonies. The main intent here is to learn, to advance in scouts, and to return to camp. At Bartle they are typically a Foxman for a year. At Geiger they are typically a foxman for a day,

Following Foxman they become braves. This is denoted by a single claw worn around the neck. At Bartle this is denoted by a single claw in front of a medicine pouch. What is in the pouch is unique to every tribesman. At Geiger they wear a single claw hanging below a lanyard.

The following camp session when they return they have the opportunity to advance to Warrior. If they are youth under 18 they will become a "Hardway Warrior" and this is evident with the two claws facing outward. if they are adult they will become a "Honorary warrior"and this is with two claws facing inward.

At both camps scouts participate in a variety of cermonies as they advance to Warrior. These ceremonies are not typically observed by non members except Parents attending under the Scouting America policy. In which case they are instructed to keep all aspects confidential to prevent ruining the experience for other youth in the troop. No photos or electronic devices are permitted at either camp. During the cemonies, attire similar to native american attire may be worn, and scout uniforms may be worn. If attire is worn it is typically a handcrafted shirt made by local amish craftsmen with ribbons attached, and utilizing a colorful fabric. At Geiger, using feather, leather, and beadwork is customary. Scouts are instructed to use their own interpretation for attire and to avoid looking identical or close enough to cause confusion with any native american tribe. Expressly prohibited is the wearing of facepaint as that has religious meaning for many native americans although it was done in the past. and

Once people have achieved warrior they are eligible for "Paint Stations" which are additional duties, often around performing ceremonies, training new braves, training new warriors, or other operations in the tribe. Between Geiger and Bartle they have an almost identical structure with Bartle having two additional paint stations. A complete list may be found here: https://www.hoac-bsa.org/micosay-ranks

For all members as they advance through the tribe, they often perform an act of service to the camp. Typically it is trail building, or a similar type of maintenance; it has been modeled after Philmont Scout Ranch who also requires hours of conservation from every camper.

== See also ==
- Order of the Arrow
- Scouting America
- Cultural Appropriation
- Firecrafter
- Scouting in Kansas
- Scouting in Missouri
- Tahquitz Community
