= Michael B. Surbaugh =

13th Chief Scout Executive

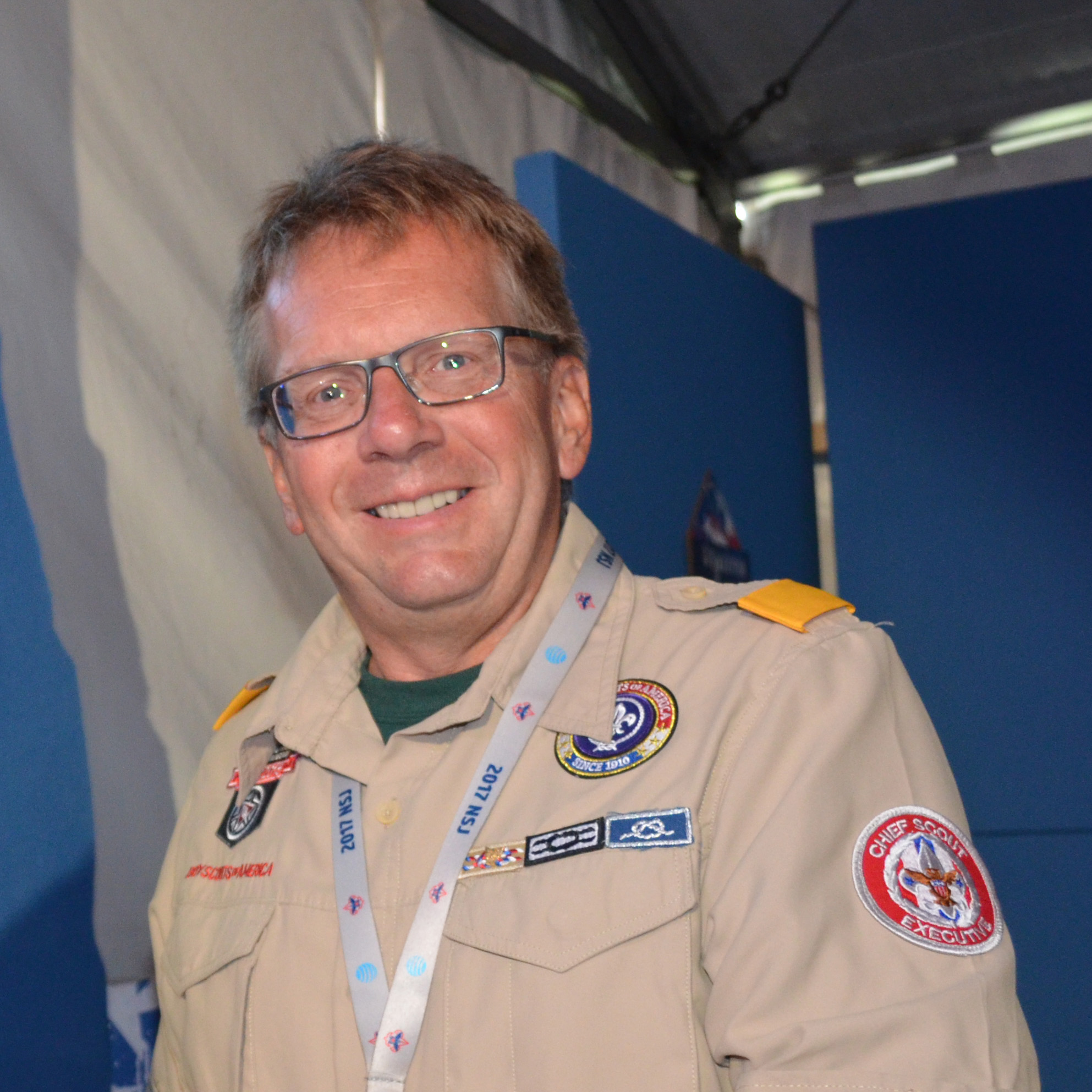
- Michael Surbaugh, 13th Chief Scout Executive, Boy Scouts of America

13th Chief Scout Executive
- In office October 1, 2015 – December 29, 2019
- Preceded by: Wayne Brock
- Succeeded by: Roger C. Mosby

Personal details
- Spouse: Lisa
- Education: Salem University

Michael B. Surbaugh was the 13th Chief Scout Executive of the Boy Scouts of America (BSA), having succeeded the retiring Wayne Brock on October 1, 2015. He was previously Group Director of HR, Innovation, Exploring and Learning for Life for the BSA. Surbaugh first joined the organization as a professional scouter in 1983.

In November 2019, Surbaugh took a medical leave of absence.

On December 29, 2019, Surbaugh's retirement was announced via an email to BSA volunteers. He was succeeded by Roger Mosby.

== Background ==
Surbaugh earned his Eagle Scout award in Troop 360 in Bethel Park, Pennsylvania in 1976 and served on the summer camp staff of the Allegheny Trails Council, the predecessor of the Laurel Highlands Council. He is a graduate of Salem College in West Virginia.

Surbaugh has been met with criticism and praise for his changes in the BSA's admission policies. During his administration, the Executive Board of the Boy Scouts of America has removed the ban against homosexual adult membership, changed the membership application to allow youth to include the gender they identify with instead of requiring the gender on their birth certificate, and has started accepting girls into the Cub Scout and Boy Scout (now renamed Scouts BSA) programs.

Boy Scouts of America
Preceded by Wayne Brock	Chief Scout Executive; 2015-2018	Succeeded by Roger Mosby
