= J. L. Tarr =

American Scouting leader (1919–2008)

J.L. Tarr
- Born: James Lee Tarr; November 21, 1919; Bartlesville, Oklahoma
- Died: February 27, 2008 (aged 88); Dallas, Texas
- Education: Oklahoma A&M University
- Employer: Boy Scouts of America
- Title: Chief Scout Executive
- Term: 1979 - 1984
- Predecessor: Harvey L. Price
- Successor: Ben H. Love
- Spouse: Margaret

James Lee Tarr (November 21, 1919 – February 27, 2008) was a professional Scouter for 43 years who served as the seventh Chief Scout Executive of the Boy Scouts of America from 1979 to 1984.

== Personal life ==
Tarr was born in Bartlesville, Oklahoma. He joined the BSA in 1931 and attained the rank of Eagle Scout in 1935. He attended Oklahoma A&M University and graduated in 1941 with a degree in business administration. He married his wife Margret in 1941.

Tarr served in the United States Naval Reserve from 1943 to 1946 as a supply officer, serving in the South Pacific. He retired in 1965 with the rank of lieutenant commander. Tarr was a member of the Rotary Club of Dallas in Dallas, Texas and served on both the Club Board of Directors and Foundation Board of Trustees.

Tarr died in Dallas, Texas, on February 27, 2008, from cancer.

== Scouting ==
Tarr became a professional Scouter in 1941 and worked in the local council in San Marcos, Texas. He later served as Scout executive of the Circle Ten Council covering North Central Texas as well as a portion of Oklahoma.

He was awarded the Distinguished Eagle Scout Award in 1979, the Order of the Arrow Distinguished Service Award and the Cliff Dochterman Award from Rotary International. He was also awarded the Bronze Wolf, the only distinction of the World Organization of the Scout Movement, awarded by the World Scout Committee for exceptional services to world Scouting.

== See also ==
Boy Scouts of America
Preceded by Harvey L. Price	Chief Scout Executive; 1979–1984	Succeeded by Ben H. Love
