= Iconium, Missouri =

- Populated place
- Interactive map of Iconium, Missouri
- Coordinates: 38°06′21″N 93°32′41″W
- Country: United States
- State: Missouri
- County: St. Clair
- Elevation: 932 ft (284 m)
- Time zone: Central (CST)
- GNIS feature ID: 756204

Iconium is an unincorporated community in St. Clair County, Missouri, United States. The town is perhaps best known for "Scott's Iconium Store," a local institution that is a frequent pilgrimage destination for Boy Scouts, due to the community's proximity to the H. Roe Bartle Scout Reservation.

Iconium was founded in 1879, and named after the ancient city of Iconium, which today is known as Konya, in central Turkey. A post office called Iconium was established in 1871, and remained in operation until 1959.
