= U.S. Scouting Service Project =

U.S. Scouting Service Project (USSSP)
- Country: United States
- Founded: 1998
- President: Gary Hendra
- Website www.usscouts.org

The U.S. Scouting Service Project (USSSP) is one of the largest online collections of Scouting resource and reference materials. Founded in 1998, USSSP is organized as a non-profit corporation and is maintained by volunteer Scouters. While the Project supports the programs of the Boy Scouts of America and the World Organization of the Scout Movement, neither organization contributes financially or provides direction to the organization.

== Background ==
The USSSP was the idea of Chris Marsey who brought together one of the largest repositories of Scouting Clip-Art to the world Scouting community in 1996. Soon thereafter, Dave Tracewell and Gary Hendra added their large electronic clip-art collections to the collection. The USSSP continued to grow, adding Scouters from around the country with specialized talents who contributed many hours of time and resources to the project.

As of 2010, most of the board members were Boy Scouts or Girl Scouts in their youth and have obtained their programs' highest youth honors. All of the board members have served at the local Council level as unit leaders, commissioners and committee chairs and collectively have more than 400 years of service. Many of the board members have served as part of a summer camp staff for two or more summers; three have taught courses at the Philmont Training Center. Two of the board members serve local Councils as Professional Scouters; another board member served for several years as a Paraprofessional Executive. Board members are Wood Badge trained and many have been honored with the BSA's Silver Beaver Award for distinguished service to one or several local Councils.

== Web site sections ==
The USSSP website as several areas of resources, being mostly a combination of file servers and sites with links to other sites.

- ScoutCamp.org - a database of all of the Scout Camps in the US with user comments.^{[a]}
- ScoutSite Search - a massive database of every scouting website, linked to councils with interactive sorting abilities.^{[b]}
- Clipart - a collection of scanned images, clipart and other files^{[c]}
- Macscouter - a collection of scouting resources, including ceremonies, planning guides, etc.^{[d]}
- Netcommish - a set of resources specifically designed to support commissioners.^{[e]}
- Scoutmaster.org - a collection of useful links for Scoutmasters and Scout leaders.^{[f]}
- Cubmaster.org - a complete set of resources and links for Cub Scout leaders.^{[g]}
- Jambo.org - information about the National Scout Jamboree.^{[h]}
- WorldScouting.org - Links to international scouting sites.^{[i]}

In addition, other member sites (for instance, several branches of Mike Walton's Tree ^{[j]}; Mike Kauffmann's Merit Badges.org ^{[k]}; and Don deYoung's Cub Scouting website)^{[l]} are elements of this "largest community of reference and resource materials geared to the American Boy Scouting programs found on the Internet's World Wide Web."

== Discussion groups and lists ==
The USSSP hosts some 11 electronic mail distribution discussion groups, ranging in topics from programming (Cub Scouting, Venturing) to program support (Philmont, Jamborees, and Commissioners). There is also a USSSP discussion group called "Embers" which offer reflection, support and inspiration to volunteers and parents.

== Board of directors ==
The USSSP operates under a national board of directors. The current officers are:

- Gary Hendra, President
- Mike Bowman, Vice President - Web Development
- Mike Walton, Vice President - Communications
- Paul Wolf, Secretary
- Kyna Hendra, Treasurer

Board Members

- Hal Daume
- Jon Eidson
- Ed Henderson
- Mike Kauffmann
- Dave Lyons

The board conducts business virtually using various electronic methods, to include video teleconferencing, voice conference calls via Skype, and electronic mail.
