= Boy Scouts of America sex abuse cases =

Allegations involving child molestation

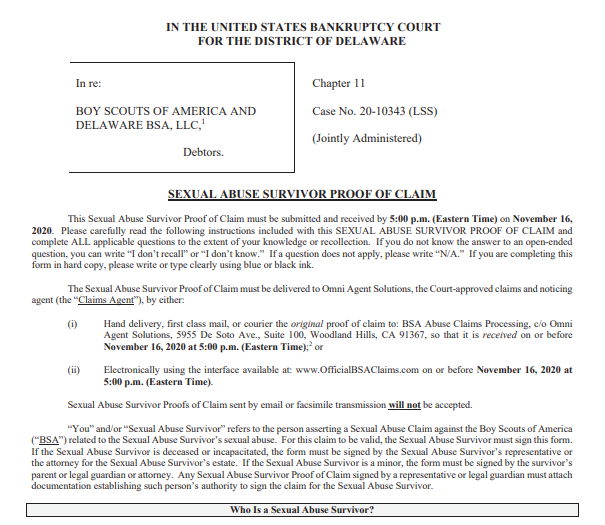
A Boy Scouts of America proof of claim form needed to be signed before November 16, 2020. The proof is a written statement setting forth a survivor claim.

The Boy Scouts of America (BSA) is one of the largest youth organizations in the United States, with 2.3 million youth members and approximately 889,000 adult volunteers in 2017. In 1979 there were over 5 million youths in BSA.

The high risk of sex abuse in volunteer youth organizations has been recognized, and, in 1988, the BSA created a sex abuse education and prevention program called the Youth Protection program to help address the problem. There were around 2,000 reported cases of abuse within the Boy Scouts of America prior to 1994.

In 2010, a jury ordered that the Boy Scouts of America pay US$18.5 million (equivalent to $27.3 million in 2025) to a scout who was abused in the 1980s – the largest punitive damages award to a single plaintiff in a child abuse case in the US.

On February 18, 2020, the Boy Scouts of America filed for a Chapter 11 financial restructuring to offer "equitable compensation" to survivors and their families. The BSA cited approximately 200 pending lawsuits in state and federal district courts across the United States and 1,700 potential claimants in total. In May of that same year, the U.S. Bankruptcy Court for the District of Delaware set November 16, 2020, at 5 pm EST as the bar date for all survivors of sexual abuse; 92,700 sexual abuse claims were filed with the bankruptcy court by the deadline.

In December 2021, the insurer for the BSA agreed to pay $800 million into a fund for survivors, and in September 2022 – as part of their bankruptcy settlement – the BSA agreed to pay over $2.4 billion into the fund, with payments beginning in September 2023.

== 1988 Youth Protection program ==
The Boy Scouts of America has long struggled with the problem of sexual abuse and how to handle abuse allegations. J.L. Tarr, a Chief Scout Executive in the 1980s, said regarding sexual assault cases against Scout leaders across all 50 states: "That's been an issue since the Boy Scouts began." Several reports have surfaced over the years regarding incidents of sexual abuse within the BSA to include incidents of repeat offenders. There have also been several high-profile court cases involving such incidents that resulted in convictions and settlements.

In the 1980s, BSA developed its Youth Protection program, a comprehensive program to educate and prevent abuse. A centerpiece of the program is the "two deep" leadership criterion, which dictates that no adult can ever be alone with any of the members. Before joining, a member must discuss with their parents a pamphlet on sexual abuse. The Youth Protection Plan from the organization is linked to a CDC report on such programs.

Kenneth Lanning, the FBI agent who helped develop the BSA's Youth Protection Plan, wrote that "A skilled pedophile who can get children into a situation where they must change clothing or stay with him overnight will almost always succeed in seducing them."

BSA adopted the following policies to provide additional barriers to child abuse within scouting. These policies are primarily for the protection of its youth members; however, they also serve to protect its adult leaders from false accusations of abuse.

- Two-deep leadership. Two registered adult leaders or one registered leader and a parent of a participant, one of whom must be 21 years of age or older, are required on all trips and outings. The "two-deep" policy requires that a minimum of two adults be present during all activities to minimize the potential for clandestine abuse. The chartered organization is responsible for ensuring that sufficient leadership is provided for all activities.
- No one-on-one contact. One-on-one contact between adults and youth members is not permitted. In situations that require personal conferences, such as a Scoutmaster's conference, the meeting is to be conducted in view of other adults and youths.
- Respect of privacy. Adult leaders must respect the privacy of youth members in situations such as changing clothes and taking showers at camp and intrude only to the extent that health and safety require. Adults must protect their privacy in similar situations.
- Separate accommodations. When camping, no youth is permitted to sleep in the tent of an adult other than his own parent or guardian. Councils are strongly encouraged to have separate showers and latrine facilities for females. When separate facilities are not available, separate times for male and female use should be scheduled and posted for showers.
- Proper preparation for high-adventure activities. Activities with elements of risk should only be undertaken with proper preparation, equipment, clothing, supervision, and safety measures.
- No secret organizations. The Boy Scouts of America does not recognize any secret organizations as part of its program. All aspects of the scouting program are open to observation by parents and leaders.
- Appropriate attire. Proper clothing for activities is required. For example, skinny-dipping is inappropriate for scouting.
- Constructive discipline. Discipline used in scouting should be constructive and reflect the values of the organization. Corporal punishment is never permitted.
- Hazing prohibited. Physical hazing and initiations are prohibited and may not be included as part of any scouting activity.
- Junior leader training and supervision. Adult leaders must monitor and guide the leadership techniques used by junior leaders and ensure that BSA policies are followed.

The plan has been criticized for not making criminal background checks a requirement for all volunteers until 2008 and that failure to require those allowed additional child molesters into the organization.

Circa early 2020, BSA indicated that over 90% of its youth protection-related pending lawsuits were for alleged incidents more than 30 years before that date.

BSA adults are required to complete the youth protection training program every two years. In 2019, the program was substantially expanded to include other aspects of youth protection, such as bullying, and new provisions were added related to the expansion of girls' participation in BSA programs. All BSA adults were required to complete the new training program in 2019. All volunteers over the age of 18 are required to complete the training and failure to do so leads to the removal of their membership until the following year when they can register again. In 2025, the youth protection training program was updated to require BSA adults to complete the training program on an annual basis.

== 1991 Washington Times investigation ==
In May 1991, The Washington Times published a major five-part investigation into sex abuse in the BSA entitled "Scouts Honor". Staff from the newspaper had worked for two years preparing the series, reviewing internal and personnel records from the Boy Scouts; court records from more than 20 states, and more than 1,000 newspaper articles; as well as interviewing more than 200 people, including molesters, families of victims, Scout leaders, sex abuse experts and lawyers. The newspaper restricted itself to reported cases of male Scout leaders abusing Boy Scouts before the introduction of its Youth Protection program. In summation, they wrote "The Boy Scouts are a magnet for men who want to have sexual relations with children... Pedophiles join the Scouts for a simple reason: it's where the boys are."

The series drew on three sources:

- Historical "confidential files" (formerly known as the "Ineligible Volunteer Files") within Scout records, with details on 231 Scout leaders banned from Scouting for sexual misconduct from 1975 through 1984.
- 50 lawsuits against the Scouts by families of molested boys from around the US.
- A list from the BSA of more than 350 men banned for sexual misconduct from 1971 to 1986.

The newspaper discovered that 1,151 Scouts reported being abused by their leaders during the studied 19-year period, mostly before the implementation of the Youth Protection Plan. They published a detailed list of 416 cases from 1971–1990 where a US Scout leader was arrested or banned from Scouting for sexual abuse of scouts, adding that experts said the real number of abusers and victims was probably several times higher. The newspaper articles later formed the basis for a book by the main journalist involved, Patrick Boyle: Scout's Honor: Sexual Abuse in America's Most Trusted Institution.

The series, written shortly after the inception of BSA's Youth Protection program, concluded that "After decades of shying away from the problem, the Scouts have created what many child abuse experts call one of the best sex abuse education programs in the country. The program teaches boys, leaders, and parents about resisting, recognizing, and reporting abuse."

=== Legal actions ===
A number of lawsuits have resulted from Boy Scouts of America sex abuse cases. A study of 50 lawsuits against the BSA showed that from 1986 to 1991 BSA and local councils agreed to pay more than $15 million in damages. According to federal tax returns, BSA payments to one law firm in Miami working on abuse cases were more than one-half million dollars; the BSA insurance reserve, from which the damages are paid, stood at $61.9 million.

The actual payment total, reported by "The Washington Times" in 1991, is probably far higher because the Scouts sometimes agree to pay damages only if the payments are kept secret. Insurers commonly require damage awards to be kept confidential.

In August 2007, the Washington state Supreme Court ordered BSA to hand over documents concerning sexual abuse by Scout leaders. These documents showed that the organization removed about 180 of its leaders each year, although most of these removals have to do with other issues besides child abuse.

== Lewis v. Boy Scouts of America et al. (2010) ==
The 2010 case Lewis v. Boy Scouts of America et al. was filed in Multnomah County, Oregon, by Kerry Lewis, a former member of the BSA who alleged having been abused by former scout leader Timur Dykes in the 1980s. In 1983, Dykes had confessed to the local BSA co-ordinator that he had molested 17 Boy Scouts, but was allowed to continue working with the Scouts where, attorneys argued, he subsequently abused Lewis.

In 2010, the jury on the case held in favor of the plaintiff and ordered that the Scouts pay $18.5 million as punishment for their actions—the largest punitive damages awarded to a single plaintiff in a child abuse case in the US. Kelly Clark, an attorney representing the abused scout, had alleged the BSA failed to properly handle the abuse, saying "We saw numerous examples of the Scouts writing to law enforcement saying 'it would be best for the good of Scouting if this could avoid being made too public.'"

Some observers said the case "could have a snowball effect in much the same way high-profile molestation suits against the Roman Catholic Church had". Patrick Boyle, author of Scout's Honor: Sexual Abuse in America's Most Trusted Institution, was quoted as commenting "Until this case, the Boy Scouts of America had managed to keep these cases largely underwater nationally. All of a sudden, it's gotten blown out of the water and the public knows that the Scouts have had this problem, too -- just like the Catholic Church."

The trial allowed an American jury to view confidential files held by BSA, although BSA had fought to keep the files secret. They showed that BSA's knowledge of abuse dates back to the 1920s. Reports said that in the US, the Scouts settled about 60 similar historic cases out of court over recent years. In 2010 in Portland, Oregon, attorneys Paul Mones and Kelly Clark won a $19.9 million verdict against the Boy Scouts of America filed by a former scout who had been sexually abused by his Scout leader in the mid-1980s. This verdict resulted in the release of the "perversion files" that had been maintained by the Boy Scouts for about ninety years. The files, which were released for the period 1965 through 1985, detailed the sexual abuse of scouts by their adult leaders.

== 2012 release of "ineligible volunteer" files ==
Since the 1920s, the BSA has maintained a highly confidential set of "ineligible volunteer" files, nicknamed the "perversion files". On October 19, 2012, the Boy Scouts of America were forced by court order to release over 20,000 pages of documentation on 1247 alleged child sexual abuse cases within the organization, covering the period from 1965 to 1985.

It has been alleged that BSA may have helped cover up the abuse cases, sometimes with the aid of police and other officials, "to protect the good name and good works of Scouting." The reports showed incidents, where accused abusers were allowed to continue in the Scouts and, in more than a third of the cases covered in the documents, information about the allegations, was not passed on to police.

A letter released by a Louisiana BSA executive to the BSA's national personnel division revealed: "This subject and Scouts were not prosecuted to save the name of Scouting." The files revealed cases of collusion between the BSA and the Justice System, as in a 1962 Johnston, PA, case where a BSA leader pleaded guilty to "serious morals" violations involving Scouts. A local Scouting executive learned of the abuse from a local executive board member who served as both mayor and police chief. Newspapers failed to report the connection to the Scouts because, as the executive wrote to BSA national's personnel division in explanation, "No mention of Scouting was involved in the case in as much as two of the three judges who pronounced sentence are members of our Executive Board". Among the files include a 1972 BSA executive writing "I would like to let this case drop ... One father has threatened legal action which could only injure the Boy Scouts of America. My personal opinion in this particular case is, 'If it don't stink, don't stir it.'"

Supporters of the BSA pointed out that the cases discussed in the files occurred before 1985. Critics, meanwhile, pointed out that as of 2012, the BSA has refused to release those files dating from after 1985. As of 2012, a Texas judge had ordered the release of the post-1985 files, but the BSA was in the process of appealing to avoid that release. A Minnesota district judge also ordered the release of the files. A California judge similarly ordered the release of more files, and the Supreme Court of California denied an appeal from the BSA. A BSA spokesman commented that "The BSA believes confidentiality of the Files helps to encourage prompt reporting of abuse".

Other reasons individuals were added to the "ineligible volunteers" list included violence or threats of violent behavior, destruction of property, or failure to uphold the standards of the scouting program.

== The Church of Jesus Christ of Latter-day Saints ==
On December 28, 2020, seven lawsuits were filed against the Church of Jesus Christ of Latter-day Saints (LDS Church) for allegedly covering up decades of sexual abuse among its Boy Scouts of America (BSA) troops in Arizona. On September 15, 2021, it was agreed that the BSA, which the LDS Church ended affiliation with in 2020, would receive an estimated $250 million in settlements from the church. Prior to the end of its BSA affiliation, the LDS Church was the organization's largest single sponsor.

== Specific cases ==
- New Orleans Boy Scout Troop 137 was a troop that operated as a front for a child sex abuse ring in the mid-1970s.
- Floyd David Slusher, a former scoutmaster in the Boulder, Colorado area, was convicted in 1977 of one count of sexually assaulting a child and received an indeterminate sentence of "one day to life." Paroled in 1984, Slusher was arrested in 1989 and convicted of three felony counts of child exploitation in 1990. After being released on parole in 2018, he was arrested again on August 9, 2018, for violating his parole.
- Joe Gibson, a former scoutmaster in the St. Petersburg, Florida area, was convicted in June 1982.
- Lee Pontius, former Daytona Beach, Florida area scoutmaster and recipient of the Silver Beaver award, was convicted multiple times of molesting Boy Scouts, including on a November 1982 camping trip.
- Martin Turner, a leader in Texas, pleaded guilty in 2008 to two counts of indecency with a child by contact and one count of attempted indecency with a child by contact. He had abused two children in cases going back up to 40 years.
- Al Steven Stein, a former boy scout leader in Santa Barbara, California, was convicted in 2009 for felony child molestation and misdemeanor possession of child pornography. Stein and the Boy Scouts of America were sued for negligent training, knowledge of Stein's propensities, and failure to report. Roe v. Boy Scouts of America, Stein et al., settled in 2015 with the BSA. J. Geck awarded judgment against Stein. BSA has since changed some of its policies as requested by plaintiffs.
- David McDonald Rankin, a former scoutmaster in College Park, Maryland, was convicted for abusing scouts between 1984 and 1987.
- Gary Lee Gephart, a former Cub Scout leader in Oceanside, California, was convicted in 1996.
- Howard W. Curtis, a Haverhill, Massachusetts leader, pleaded guilty in May 2008 for acts occurring in the 1980s.
- James Hiatt, a former Boy Scout leader in Texas, was convicted in May 2008 for abuse that took place from about 2003 to 2005.
- Camp employee Brad Stowell confessed to molesting 24 boys from 1989 until his arrest in 1997. Authorities working at the camp were warned numerous times during his employment. In 1988, at age 16, Stowell had admitted to police to the prior molestation of a six-year-old: scout officials were also aware of this fact.
- Gary Wade Brown, a former Boy Scout leader in Orem, Utah, in 2009 pleaded guilty to four counts of sexual abuse of a child and sexual exploitation of a minor, second-degree felonies, and one count of lewdness involving a child, a class A misdemeanor. Seven additional charges were dismissed as part of a plea agreement. The abuse involved a 12-year-old boy and took place between 2005 and 2006.
- Charles Donald Corley, a Boy Scout volunteer in Birmingham, Alabama, was convicted for sexual abuse against three young men in 1995.
- Richard Turley, a former volunteer in California, was convicted of kidnapping and sexually assaulting an 11-year-old Canadian scout. After 18 months, he was released from a mental institution and returned to volunteer work at a California scout camp. In 1979, he assaulted three of those scouts. Upon learning this, the Boy Scouts of America simply told Turley to return to Canada, not warning Scouts Canada of Turley's criminal behavior. In 1996, Turley went on to assault four boys, three of whom were scouts, in Victoria, British Columbia. He was sentenced to seven years in prison.
- James Molyneaux, 2004, a former Boy Scout leader and 6th-grade English school teacher in Portville, New York, was arrested in connection to an abuse case of a 13-year-old in July 1997 at a campground owned by the Molyneaux family that was used for scouting activities and another case of an 11-year-old at his home in Portville, New York in September 2000. Although Molyneaux denied the charges, at trial he was found guilty of two counts of first-degree sodomy, two counts of second-degree sodomy, and one count of first-degree sexual abuse. Molyneaux was sentenced to a maximum of 57 years in the Clinton Correctional Facility. An appeal was not considered.
- Garth David Snively, 1994, a former Boy Scout leader, was convicted of two counts of first-degree child molestation and sentenced to 11 years after his 1993 arrest for molesting at least 20 Boy Scout members of various ages over several years, as well as while a mentor in the Big Brothers program. His victims testified in court that while at his home in Everett, Washington, Snively would apply baby powder to and fondle their genitals, make them wear diapers and, in addition, make them fondle, powder and diaper him. A Level III sex offender, Snively was released and now resides in Centralia, Washington.
- Jerrold Schwartz, a volunteer with Troop 666 in Manhattan from 1978 to 2001, was charged with more than 30 counts of sodomy alleged to have occurred in 1996 and 1997, while Schwartz was serving as the troop's scoutmaster. The victim claimed the abuse began in 1994, when he was 13 years old, but New York's statute of limitations had already expired on acts before 1996. At Schwartz's arraignment, the prosecution produced an audio recording of Schwartz admitting to and apologizing for the abuse in a conversation with his victim. Attorneys for the victim, who filed a $50 million suit against Schwartz and the Boy Scouts of America, stated that four other victims claimed that they were also abused by Schwartz in the 1980s and 1990s, but those acts were barred from prosecution by the statute of limitations. A previous abuse complaint had been lodged with the local Boy Scout council against Schwartz in 1994, but he was permitted to continue as scoutmaster after police determined the accusation to be unfounded. In exchange for pleading guilty to four of the charges against him, Schwartz was promised a maximum sentence of between 2 2/3 and eight years. Schwartz was released on parole from Oneida Correctional Facility in January 2008, after serving five years and four months for his crimes.
- Cubmaster Franklin Keith "Frank" Tercey and Den Leader Coach Judith Tercey organized orgies involving underage scouts and local girls in their home in Moccasin Street, San Diego, California. They were arrested in December 1975, and resigned from the organization later that month. Frank was convicted and sentenced to five years probabation, with six months incarceration. Judith was not prosecuted.

== Bankruptcy ==
In an effort to consolidate the claims brought against it, the BSA filed for bankruptcy and established a compensation fund.

In 2022, the BSA recognized the "Survivors of abuse in Scouting", for the courage they displayed in coming forward.

== Documentaries ==
In June 2022, Irene Taylor produced Leave No Trace: A Hidden History of the Boy Scouts, for Hulu and theatrical release, which examined the history of abuse and cover-ups in the organization. In September 2023, Netflix released Scouts Honor: The Secret Files of the Boy Scouts of America. Both documentaries make reference to the "perversion files".
