= Wayne Brock =

Chief executive of the Boy Scouts of America

C. Wayne Brock
- Born: 1948 (age 77–78); New Bern, North Carolina, U.S.
- Education: East Carolina University
- Occupation: Chief executive officer
- Employer: Boy Scouts of America
- Title: Chief Scout Executive
- Predecessor: Robert J. Mazzuca
- Successor: Michael B. Surbaugh
- Spouse: Ernestine Rouse Brock
- Children: C. Richard "Richie" Brock
- Parent(s): C. Oscar & Vera Brock

Wayne Brock (born 1948) is a professional scouter, who served as the 12th Chief Scout Executive of the Boy Scouts of America from 2012 to 2015. He had previously served as deputy Chief Scout Executive from 2009 to 2012.

== Biography ==
Brock attended South Lenoir High School and graduated in 1966, receiving his Bachelor of Music Education degree from East Carolina University. He and his wife, Ernestine, have a son and one granddaughter.

Brock began his Scouting career in 1972 as a district executive in New Bern, North Carolina, then served on the staff in Knoxville, Tennessee. He also served as Scout executive in Athens, Georgia and Atlanta, GA; Scout executive in Orlando, Florida; regional director of the Southern Region in Atlanta, Georgia, and then as assistant chief Scout executive. As deputy chief Scout Executive, Brock was the BSA's chief operating officer.

His appointment to succeed Robert J. Mazzuca as chief Scout executive, the equivalent of a chief executive officer, was announced May 21, 2012. He officially took office on September 1, 2012, as the 12th person to hold the position of chief Scout executive since the BSA was founded in 1910. He was succeeded by Michael B. Surbaugh on October 1, 2015.

Brock is a recipient of the Distinguished Eagle Scout Award, Vigil Honor Member of the Order of the Arrow and recipient of the Order's Distinguished Service Award.

Boy Scouts of America
Preceded by Robert J. Mazzuca	Chief Scout Executive; 2012-2015	Succeeded by Michael B. Surbaugh
