= Scouting in Missouri =

Scouting in Missouri has a long history, from the 1910s to the present day.

== Early history (1910-1950) ==
According to William D. Murray, a charter member of the executive board of the Boy Scouts of America (BSA) when it incorporated on February 8, 1910, the first "Troop" to form in Missouri was formed by an Englishman in Sedalia, MO sometime in 1908 or 1909. In his 1937 book "The History of the Boy Scouts of America," he goes on to say that this man had even gone so far as to appoint field representatives in other states as well.

The 1938 National Order of the Arrow Lodge Meeting was held at Irondale, Missouri.

== Scouting America ==
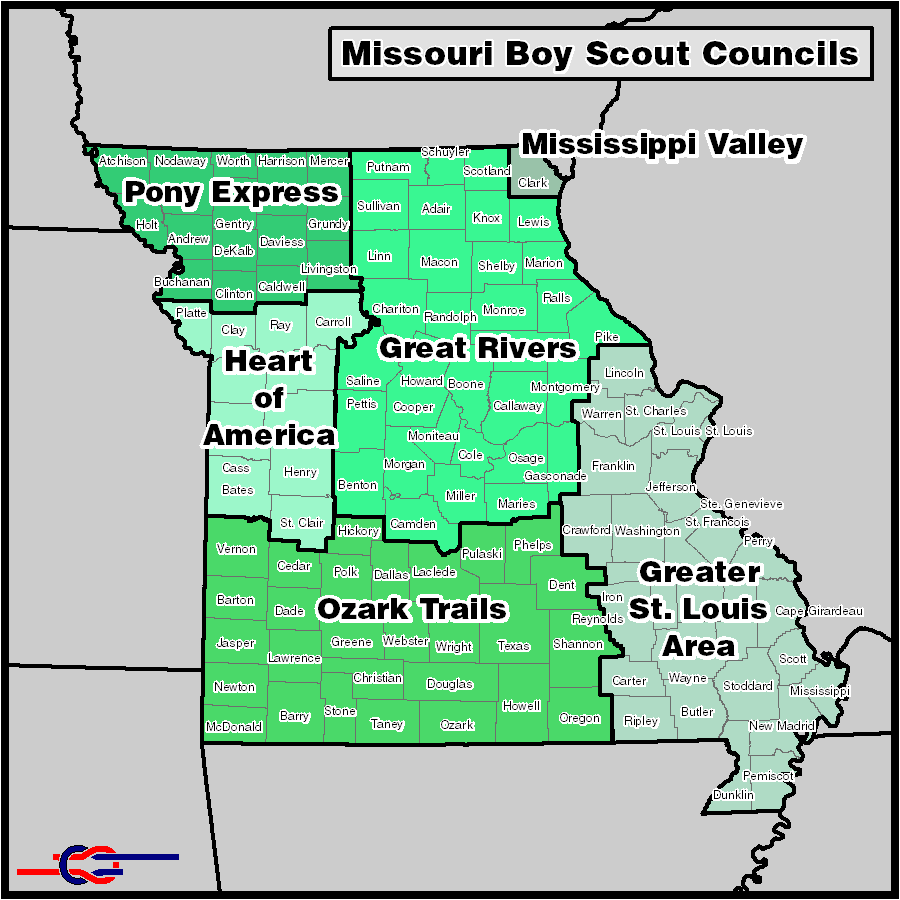
BSA Councils serving Missouri

There are six BSA local councils in Missouri.

=== Great Rivers Council ===
Great Rivers Council (653) is based in Columbia, Missouri and serves Scouts in 33 counties in Mid-Missouri. In 1971 Great Rivers Council merged with Lake of the Ozarks Council (314).

==== Districts ====
- Black Diamond is located in Randolph, Schuyler, Sullivan, Putnam, Adair, Scotland, Knox, Linn, Macon, and Western Shelby, counties.
- Boonslick is located in Boone, Cooper and Howard counties
- Five Rivers is located in Cole, Osage, Gasconade and Maries counties.
- Grand Prairie is located in Callaway, Audrain and Montgomery counties.
- Kinderhook is located in Morgan, Moniteau and Camden counties.
- Mark Twain is located in Pike, Ralls, Lewis, Monroe, Marion and Eastern Shelby counties.
- Osage Trails is located in Chariton, Saline, Pettis and Benton counties.

==== Lake of the Ozarks Scout Reservation ====
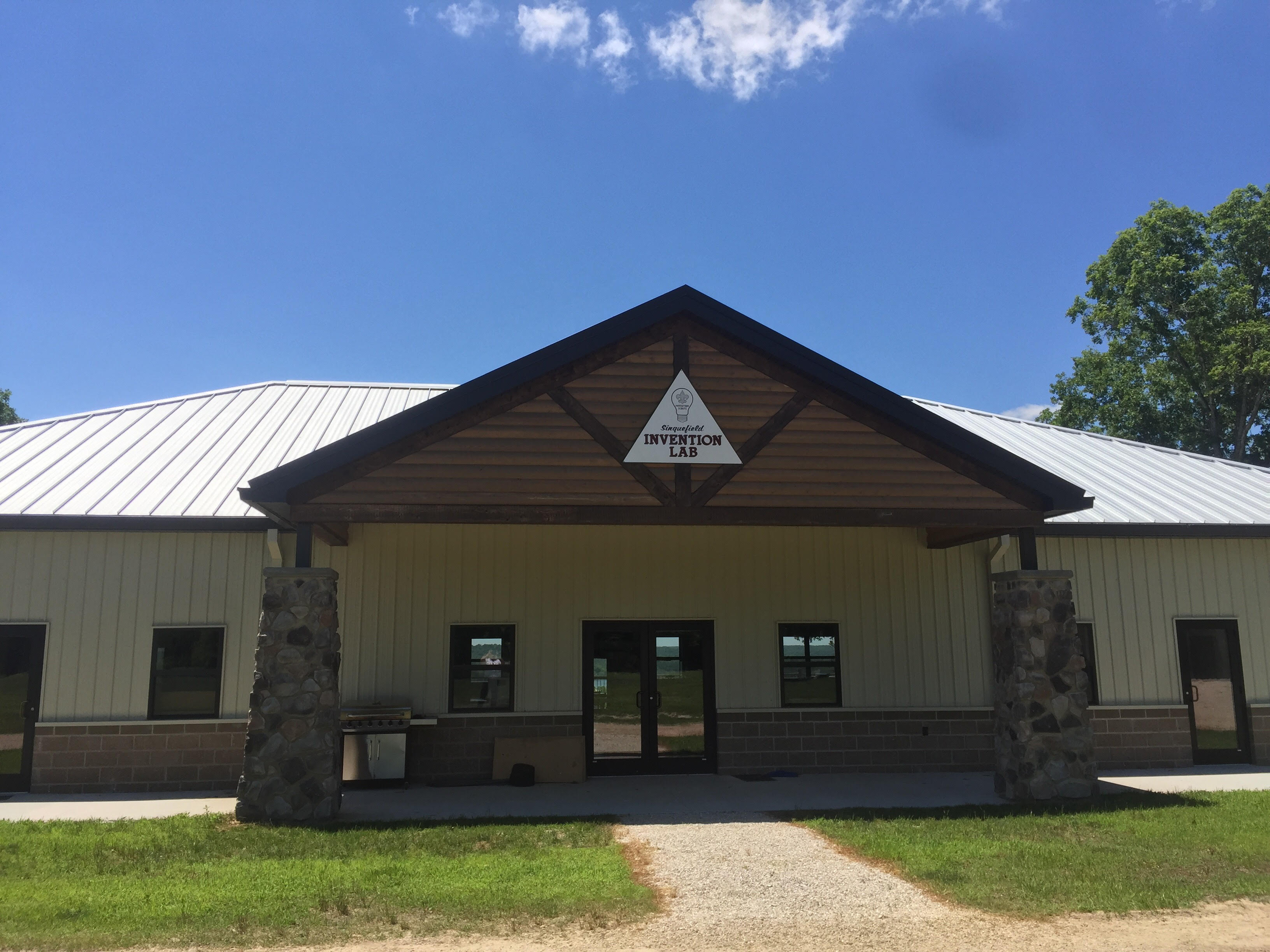
Entrance to the Sinquefield Invention Lab

The council operates Lake of the Ozarks Scout Reservation, also known as Camp Hohn. Scouts BSA and Venturing Camps are offered at Hohn. The camp is available for year-round use by Scout units for a variety of activities.

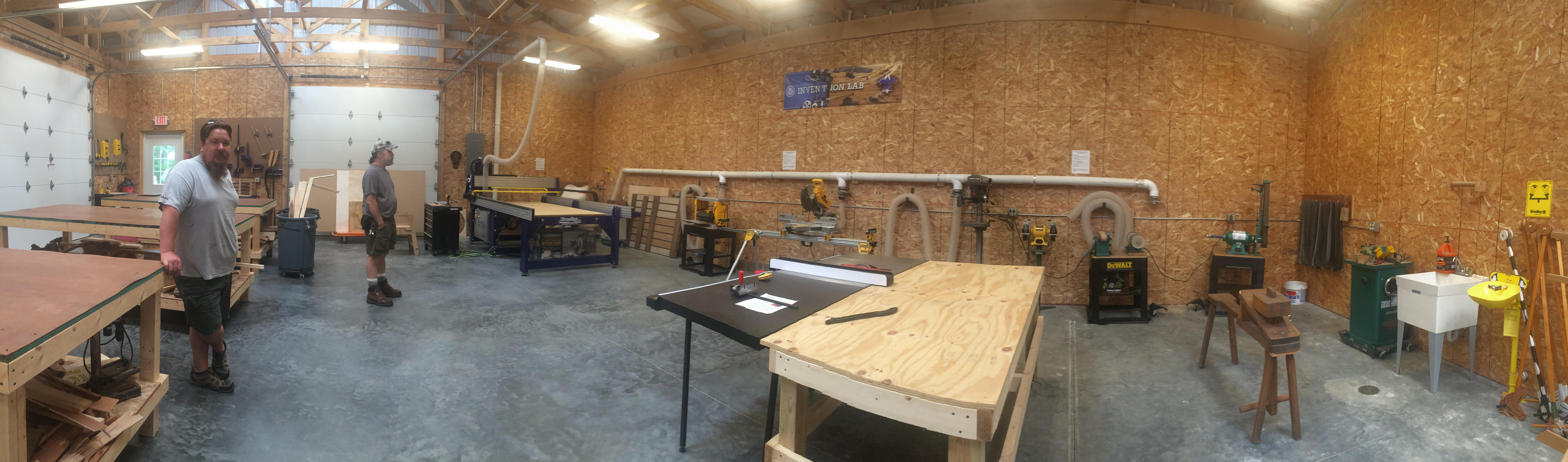
Inside the Sinquefield Program Building

Lake of the Ozarks Scout Reservation is located on the Lake of the Ozarks Osage Arm at mile marker 44 near Laurie, Missouri. The camp offers facilities and equipment available for unit use and the Kit Carson Trail, an eight-mile-long perimeter trail which winds through the hills and along the bluff overlooking the Lake. The Lake of the Ozarks Scout Reservation is home to the Sinquefield Invention Lab, Program Building and Welding/Blacksmithing Shop. The Sinquefield Invention Lab and Program Building was opened in May 2017, and is currently the only invention lab in the entire Boy Scouts of America. The Welding/Blacksmithing Shop opened in 2019. The facility has 9 labs: electronics & robotics, 2D design & woodworking, 3D modeling, blacksmithing, print & design, multimedia, leadership, business & ethics, and creativity. The Sinquefield Invention Lab and Program Building is used year-round as a merit-badge workshop, camping facility, and training center.

In addition, the Great Rivers Council has two mobile invention labs. These labs can be hooked onto a truck and taken anywhere in the council.

With the addition of the Sinquefield Invention Lab & Program Building, the Lake of the Ozarks Scout Reservation is currently the only Scouts BSA camp where scouts have access to an invention lab, a COPE/Climbing course, shooting sports, and a full aquatics program.

==== Camp Thunderbird ====
Started 1960 (based on its 50th-anniversary in 2010), now closed.

Located in Randolph County Latitude 39.542258 Longitude -92.3293471 on Lake Thunderbird.

- 547 acres 12 group campsites Platform tents provided.
- Dining Hall or Patrol Cooking 33 Merit Badges offered.

==== Order of the Arrow ====
The council is served by the Nampa-Tsi lodge.

In 1971 Metab #216 and Po-E-Mo #426 merged. This merge took place after the Great Rivers Council merged with the Lake of the Ozark Council. The name Nampa-Tsi translated means "twin lodges."

There have been different designs for the lodge pocket flap. The original design of our lodge flap, by Vigil Honor James Quick, had an Osage (pronounced Oh-Song-Eh) Indian with a reservation hat, a coup staff, a flaming arrow, a lake and rivers, and two tepees. Some think that the hat was worn by the Osage Indian because they traded with settlers. This was not the case. The hats were taken as coup from pioneer settlers after they had been scalped.

==== Sons of Daniel Boone ====
Originally, the Sons of Daniel Boone was created by Daniel Carter Beard to encourage boys to go outdoors for recreation. This organization became the Boy Pioneers of America which merged with similar outdoor groups into the Boy Scouts of America in 1910. In 2006, the Sons of Daniel Boone reemerged as an honor camp society for Scouts and Scouters who have kept returning to Great Rivers Council Summer Camp.

==== Invention Scouts ====
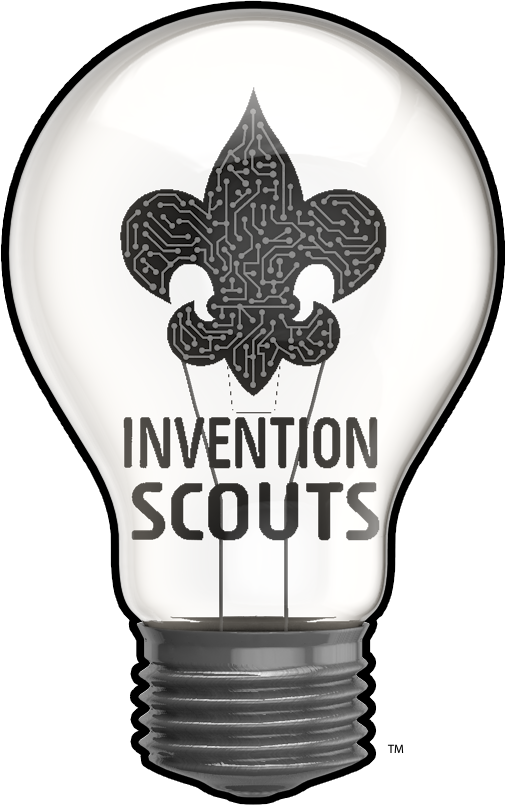
Invention Scouts Logo

Invention Scouts was founded in the Great Rivers Council in 2015 by Dr. Jeanne Sinquefield. It was founded as a Boy Scouts of America alternative to traditional STEM programs, which were too expensive and exclusive. The motto of Invention Scouts is "become an inventor and entrepreneur for life". The program is coeducational and is available to boys and girls aged 11–21. Scouts are exposed to cutting-edge equipment such as laser engravers, 3D printers, and CNC routers among others. Invention Scouts has its own ranks: Invention Scouts, Apprentice, Journeyman, & Master.

=== Heart of America Council ===
Heart of America Council has its headquarters in Kansas City, Missouri, and serves Scouts in both Missouri and Kansas. The council has three sponsored camps: H. Roe Bartle Scout Reservation, Theodore Naish Scout Reservation, and Rotary Camp. Bartle offers Micosay as an honor society, and Naish is home to the Tamegonit Lodge of the Order of the Arrow.

=== Mississippi Valley Council ===
Mississippi Valley Council is headquartered in Quincy, Illinois, and is served by Black Hawk Lodge #67. This council serves Scouts in Illinois, Missouri and Iowa.

=== Ozark Trails Council ===
Ozark Trails Council
- Location: Springfield, MO
- Country: United States
- Founded: 1995
- Council Scout Executive: Travis Rubelee
- Website http://www.ozarktrailsbsa.org/

Ozark Trails Council is based in Springfield, Missouri, and serves Scouts in Missouri and Kansas. Camps in the Ozark Trails Council include:

- Camp Arrowhead offers programs for all Scouts, from first-year Trailblazer to High Adventure. Camp Arrowhead is situated on approximately 650 beautiful wooded acres in the Ozark Mountains near Marshfield in southwest Missouri. The property features a lake, many miles of hiking trails, a stream, caves, a spring, and many examples of native Missouri flora and fauna.

Scouts camping at Camp Arrowhead may enjoy traditional outdoor Scouting activities – backpacking, hiking, fishing, swimming, archery and shooting – as well as more challenging “adventure” and “aquatics” programs. These include: a C.O.P.E. course, mountain biking, rappelling, canoeing, small-boat sailing and snorkeling.

- Cow Creek located on Table Rock Lake just south of Branson, Missouri. Cow Creek is available for unit camping. The property is winterized October 1 through April 15; during this time utility water will not be available.

==== Districts ====
- Blazing Trails District
- Frontier District
- Mo-Kan District
- Nih-Ka-Ga-Hah District
- Osage Hills District
- Pathfinder District
- River Trails District

==== Camp Arrowhead ====
Camp Arrowhead is in Marshfield, Missouri located in Southwest Missouri.

The camp was started in 1924, and is the oldest continually operating Scouts BSA Camp west of the Mississippi River.

Camp Arrowhead offers programs for all Scouts, from first-year Trailblazer to High Adventure. Camp Arrowhead is situated on approximately 650 beautiful wooded acres in the Ozark Mountains near Marshfield in southwest Missouri. The property features a lake, many miles of hiking trails, a stream, caves, a spring, and many examples of native Missouri flora and fauna. The camp was likely named for the county's Native American relics.

Scouts camping at Camp Arrowhead may enjoy traditional outdoor Scouting activities – backpacking, hiking, fishing, swimming, archery and shooting – as well as more challenging “adventure” and “aquatics” programs. These include: a C.O.P.E. course, mountain biking, rappelling, canoeing, small-boat sailing and snorkeling.

==== Order of the Arrow ====
The council is served by Wah-Sha-She Lodge #42 since 1995. Wah-Sha-She was formed from the merger of Osage Lodge #42 and Ni-Ka-Ga-Hah Lodge #91. Lodge #42 has had a strong presence in the Section, Region, and National level. It has hosted several conclaves at Camp Arrowhead and been home to many section officers.

Wah-She-She has participated in every NOAC since its formation and has sponsored several teams in dance, ceremony, and other competitions. At the 2015 NOAC, Wah-Sha-She Lodge took 1st in the basketball competition.

=== Pony Express Council ===
The Pony Express Council is based in Saint Joseph, Missouri, and also serves Scouts in Kansas. The council's summer camp is Camp Geiger, which is one of only two camps in the United States to offer Mic-O-Say rather than Order of the Arrow as the Scout honorary society. In the late 1970s, Pony Express Executive Parvin Bishop started the first Project C.O.P.E. program in the United States at the camp. After Bishop became Director of Program at the National Office, he expanded the program so that it became national.

- Crossed Arrows District
- Kanza District
- Ma-Has-Kah District
- Otoe District
- Robidoux District

==== Camp Geiger ====
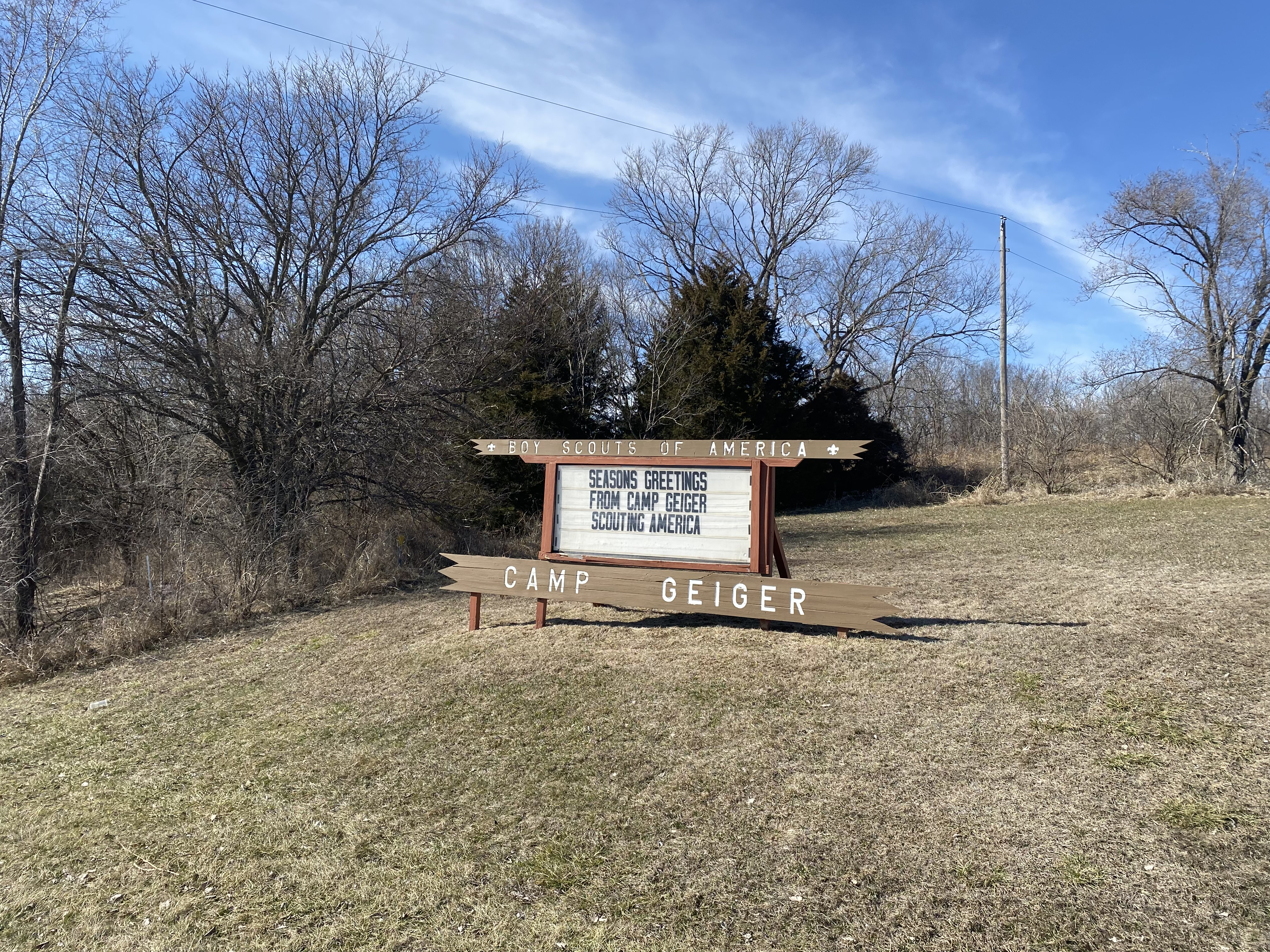

Camp Geiger is a Scouts BSA camp on the bluffs above the Missouri River two miles (3 km) northwest of St. Joseph, Missouri in Andrew County, Missouri at 39.835272°N 94.874134°W used by the Pony Express Council. It is one of the only two scout camps including H. Roe Bartle Scout Reservation in the United States to use Mic-O-Say rather than Order of the Arrow exclusively as its Scout honor society. It was first camp in the United States to offer Project C.O.P.E.

The camp is named for Charles Geiger, a St. Joseph physician, who donated land from his boyhood home in 1930. It replaced Camp Brinton at Agency, Missouri (named for W.E. Brinton who had loaned 30 acres (120,000 m^{2}) for the camp) which had been the Scout council's main summer camp since 1918. Scouting executive H. Roe Bartle founded the Mic-O-Say organization at Camp Brinton in 1925 while serving as head of the Pony Express council. Bartle was to found a Mic-O-Say chapter in Kansas City, Missouri when he was transferred to being head of the Heart of America chapter in Kansas City there in 1929. However, the Kansas City chapter also includes Order of the Arrow in its offering at its Camp Naish while having Mic-O-Say exclusively at its other camp—Camp Bartle.

In 1930 Geiger announced the donation and in 1935 it opened with a Dining Hall made of native limestone. In the 1950s, the council bought land higher on the bluffs and further to the north and a "new Camp Geiger" was begun with the bulk of the camp moved to the higher land in 1952. The original swimming pool lower on the bluff was replaced in 1971 with a new pool on top of the bluff.

In the late 1970s the Pony Express Council began Project COPE, which is aimed at encouraging teamwork, self-confidence, trust, leadership, communication, decision-making, and problem-solving. It was championed by Pony Express Council Executive Parvin Bishop who expanded the program when he became Director of Program at the National Office.

A new Dining Hall and Headquarters/Health Lodge buildings were built in 1992 after land was purchased on the road entering the camp.

== Girl Scouts of the USA ==
Map of Girl Scout Councils in Missouri

Missouri has three Girl Scout councils.

=== Girl Scouts of Eastern Missouri ===
Girl Scouts of Eastern Missouri serves more than 43,000 girls and has over 15,000 adult volunteers.

It was formed by merging Girl Scouts of The Becky Thatcher Area and The Girl Scout Council of Greater Saint Louis in 2007.

Headquarters: St. Louis, Missouri

Camps:

- Camp Cedarledge is nearly 700 acres (280 ha) near Pevely, Missouri. Originally an old farm acquired by the Girl Scouts in 1927 and later expanded.
- Camp Fiddlecreek is 83 acres (34 ha) near Labadie, Missouri.
- Camp Tuckaho is 521 acres (211 ha) near Troy, Missouri.

=== Girl Scouts of Northeast Kansas and Northwest Missouri ===
Girl Scouts of Northeast Kansas and Northwest Missouri (GSKSMO) supports girls in 47 counties across Kansas and Missouri.

It was established on August 1, 2007, after a merger of three councils: Girl Scouts of Kaw Valley Council, Girl Scouts of the Midland Empire, and Girl Scouts of Mid-Continent Council.

Headquarters: Overland Park, Kansas

Website: https://www.gsksmo.org.

==== Camps ====
- Camp Prairie Schooner is over 170 acres (69 ha) near Kansas City, Missouri acquired in 1945.
- Camp Tongawood is 80 acres (32 ha) near Tonganoxie, Kansas.

==== Former Properties ====
- Camp Daisy Hindman, founded in 1929, is 160 acres (65 ha) in Dover, Kansas near Topeka.
- Camp Cutteru is near Junction City, Kansas
- Camp Oakledge was 410 acres (170 ha) near Warsaw, Missouri. It specializes in aquatic activities and started in 1945.
- Camp Timberlake was 72 acres (29 ha) near Stilwell, Kansas and started in 1959.
- Camp ToKaVaCa was 80 acres (32 ha) in Topeka, Kansas
- Warrensburg Little House was in Warrensburg, Missouri
- Winding River Camp was an equestrian camp of over 400 acres (160 ha) near Dearborn, Missouri. It started in 1965.
- Camp Woodland was near Albany, Missouri. It became a Girl Scout camp in 1948.

=== Girl Scouts of the Missouri Heartland ===
Girl Scouts Missouri Heartland includes 67 counties in Missouri, Kansas, and Oklahoma. It serves over 9,000 girls and has over 4,000 adult volunteers.

It was formed by a merger of Girl Scouts — Cotton Boll Area Council, Girl Scouts of Dogwood Trails Council, Girl Scouts — Heart of Missouri Council, Girl Scouts of Otahki Council, and Girl Scout Council of The Ozark Area on October 1, 2008.

Headquarters: Springfield, Missouri

Service Centers:

- Cape Girardeau, Missouri
- Dexter, Missouri
- Jefferson City, Missouri
- Joplin, Missouri

Camps:

- Camp Friendship Fields is 53 acres (21 ha) north of Pittsburg, Kansas (Crawford County, Kansas)
- Camp Latonka is on the shores of Lake Wappapello in Wayne County, Missouri
- Silver Meadows is 130 acres (53 ha) near Columbia, Missouri (Boone County)

Former Properties

- Finbrooke Outdoor Center is 285 acres (115 ha) near Rogersville, Missouri (Christian County)
- Green Berry Acres is 4 acres (1.6 ha) near the state capital, Jefferson City, Missouri (Cole County)

== Baden-Powell Service Association in Missouri ==
Missouri is home to the Baden-Powell Service Association's former Chief Commissioner, David Atchley. Atchley, an Eagle Scout in the Boy Scouts of America, joined up in 2008, after being asked to leave his local Greater St. Louis Area Council after attempting to create a non-discrimination policy for the Cub Scout pack he was Cubmaster for. He started forming youth scouting sections for the BPSA based on other Traditional Scouting groups based in Canada and Great Britain. In 2009, Atchley became Chief Commissioner. Atchley then chartered his own BPSA scout group in 2010 called 10th Daniel Boone (now defunct) in Washington, Missouri. He resigned his position as Chief Commissioner to Susan Pesznecker in August 2015.

Currently, the Baden-Powell Service Association has just one chartered scout group in Missouri, and that is in the St. Louis, Missouri area. The BPSA is an inclusive, "back to basics" organization that welcomes boys and girls from 5 years of age through adulthood.

=== 66th Confluence ===
66th Confluence BPSA
- Location: St. Louis, Missouri
- Country: United States
- Founded: 2012
- Founders: Bridgett Wissinger, Jeffrey Kopp, Kathleen Carson, Karl Wulff, Jessica Saigh
- Membership: 54 (as of May 1, 2017)
- Group Scoutmaster: Colin Suchland
- Rover Scout Leader: Jeffrey Kopp
- Pathfinder Scoutmaster: David Mulcahy
- Timberwolf Pack Leader: Elke Overton
- Otter Raft Leader: Rebecca Durst
- Website http://www.66thconfluence.org/

The 66th Confluence scout group was formed in November 2012 following a BPSA Brownsea Training Camp that took place September 14–16, 2012 at Klondike Park in Augusta, Missouri. Several of the newly received Rover Squires from that training returned to St. Louis to begin the formation of the scout group, the ordinal "66" coming from the U.S. Route 66 highway that once crossed St. Louis, as well as the confluence of the Missouri and Mississippi Rivers, which is also in St. Louis.
