= Heart of America Council =

Scouting America organization (Pending)

- Owner: Boy Scouts of America
- Headquarters: Kansas City, Missouri
- Country: United States
- Founded: July 1, 1974
- President: David Chinnery
- Council Commissioner: Brian Streich
- Scout Executive/CEO: Brick Huffman
- Website http://www.hoac-bsa.org/

Heart of America Council (HOAC) serves scouts in Missouri and Kansas. This council was formed on July 1, 1974, with the merger of the former Kansas City Area (Kansas City, Missouri) and Kaw (Kansas City, Kansas) Councils. The council celebrated its 50th anniversary in July, 2024. Council headquarters has moved many times over the years, but the current location is 10210 Holmes Rd, Kansas City, MO 64131.

== History ==
Scouting in Kansas City [Kansas City] (KC) formally began with a leader's meeting at the YMCA's Tenth and Oak building on August 10, 1910. On October 15, the first KC Boy Scout organization was chartered with 20 members and consisted of four districts. In 1914, the council boasted its first Eagle Scout, Ralph Frank, of Troop 40. Shortly thereafter in 1915, the need for a full-time official Scout Executive was realized and Mr. A. L. Palmer Jr. filled the position. The council was then honored in 1926 to have Lord Baden Powell, Chief Scout of the world, visit. All the while, the man who would forever change KC, and the area's scouting movement, was getting his start.

Harold Roe Bartle first became a Scout Executive in 1923 in Casper, Wyoming. It was there that Bartle formed a relationship with the Northern Arapaho on the Wind River Indian Reservation, eventually leading to the incorporation of the honors camping program Micosay in the HOAC. In 1925, Bartle became the Scout Executive in the Pony Express Council in St. Joseph, MO where he first instituted The Tribe of Mic-O-Say. The growth of scouting in the Pony Express Council led to Bartle being recruited to be the Scout Executive in the larger KC Council in 1928, bringing The Tribe of Mic-O-Say with him. The Tribe of Mic-O-Say established in St. Joseph and Micosay in the HOAC are no longer associated and carry distinct differences. Bartle served as the KC Scout Executive until 1950 and became mayor of KCMO in 1955. His influence and leadership in KC and KC scouting is unmatched and his legacy lives on in various forms like council camps, Bartle Hall, and American Humanics.

HOAC has grown from a fledgling organization in 1910 to a council serving over 16,000 youth with 534 Eagle Scouts in 2025. There are 7,373 trained leaders volunteering their time and talent to serve the youth in the nineteen counties making up the council. In 2025 Scouts provided 106,626 service hours to their communities, equating to $3.6mil in service. Over 19,000 Scouts camped at one of the camps run by the HOAC during 2025. These numbers include both male and female participants, as the Boy Scouts of America officially allowed female youth into the program on February 1, 2019 and changed its name to Scouts BSA.

== 2026 District Organization ==
HOAC Districts
District Name	Areas Served
Blue Elk	Blue Springs, Buckner, Grain Valley, Independence, Oak Grove, Sibley, Sugar Creek, Lexington, Odessa, & Wellington.
Frontier	Includes all Units participating in the ScoutReach program. Does not have a geographical boundary.
Iron Horse	Olathe, Spring Hill, DeSoto, & Gardner/Edgerton school districts and Douglas, Franklin, and Anderson counties in KS.
Kaw	Wyandotte & Leavenworth counties and Shawnee Mission school district.
Lone Bear	Johnson, Henry, Bates, and St. Clair counties in MO.
North Star	Platte, Clay, Ray, & Carroll counties in MO.
Soaring Eagle	Blue Valley school district and Miami & Linn counties in KS.
Three Trails	Lee's Summit, KCMO, Center, Raytown, Grandview, Hickman Mills, & Lone Jack school districts.

== Activities ==
The HOAC collaborates with local teams and businesses to offer a variety of activities to all scouts within the council. Annual offerings usually include Scout Night at Sporting KC, the KC Mavericks, and the Monarchs, Scout Day at the K (Royals), Speedway, and KC Zoo & Aquarium, Haunted Trails and OA Mini Camp at Naish, and Cope-A-Palooza, Shoot-A-Palooza, and Webelos Weekend at Bartle.

There are also a number of training courses including Wilderness First Aid, Leave No Trace Instructor Courses, Wood Badge, etc.

== Camps ==
The HOAC has had many summer camp locations over the years, but offers three camps as of 2026. The H. Roe Bartle Scout Reservation and Theodore Naish Scout Reservation host scouts (ages 11-17), with Naish additionally hosting Cub Camp (ages 5-11). The third is Rotary Camp, which hosts scouts with special needs and is shared with other organizations.

=== H. Roe Bartle Scout Reservation ===
Camp Osceola, now known as The H. Roe Bartle Scout Reservation (1953-Present), opened in 1930 and is located in 4,200 acres (17 km^{2}) of woodland outside of Osceola, Missouri, and bordering on Truman Lake (dam & reservoir) in the HOAC Lone Bear district. It leases 603 acres from the U.S. Army Corps of Engineers along the lake. It was opened in named after former Kansas City, Missouri, mayor and Scout Executive H. Roe Bartle. The reservation is divided into three camps named Lone Star (previously Wigwam [end of 1955-1978], Camp A [1955]), Sawmill (previously Camp B [1955]), and Piercing Arrow (previously Frontier [1962-1991]). Additionally, an honors camping program called Micosay is hosted. Bartle is the only ten-day long-term scout camp left in the country and hosts five sessions. It is also 2 1/2 miles away from Iconium, Missouri. Iconium, known as "Ico" to local scouts, is a staple of camp life and known for its Peach Nehi Floats. Unfortunately, the store burned down on December 23, 2024 due to an alleged electrical fire. The scouting community rallied behind the owners and the beloved store allowing them to host temporary stands in 2025 and 2026. However, there have been no indications that rebuilding will occur.

=== Rotary Youth Camp ===
Rotary Youth Camp opened on 40 acres in Lee's Summit, Missouri in July, 1925 and has served over 300,000 youth and young adults since its opening. When designing the camp, accessibility for all scouts was a priority and remains so to this day with any renovations that are completed. Campers are also never charged for attending, with the Rotarians making it a point to never turn away campers due to finances. Rotary Camp for scouts is a five day, long-term camping experience.

=== Theodore Naish Scout Reservation ===
Theodore Naish Scout Reservation is an 850-acre Scout camp located in Bonner Springs, Kansas. The camp was named after Kansas City civil engineer and draftsman Theodore Naish, who was killed in the sinking of the RMS Lusitania in 1915. The first 90 acres (360,000 m^{2}) of the land were donated to the Boy Scouts in 1926 by Naish's wife, Belle Saunders Naish. The camp hosts one seven-day session for scouts, and multiple two-day sessions for each cub scout rank. It celebrated its 100th anniversary in 2026. Naish is also home to Tamegonit Lodge of the Order of the Arrow, Scouting America's national honor camping program.

== Order of the Arrow ==
Tamegonit Lodge
- Lodge Chief: Ben Dresbach
- Lodge Adviser: Troy Johnson
- Staff Adviser: Tanner Fuson
- Website www.tamegonit.net

Tamegonit Lodge is in the Order of the Arrow (OA) and located at the Theodore Naish Scout Reservation in Bonner Springs, Kansas. OA is meant to recognize scouts that exemplify the scout oath and law in their daily lives, promote outdoor adventure, provide leadership to their units, and provide cheerful service.

OA reached Naish in 1939, where Tamegonit Lodge became the 147th to charter with the National Council. In 1958, the lodge was honored to host the bi-annual National Order of the Arrow Conference (NOAC) at the University of Kansas. The 1974 merger of the Kaw and Kanas City Councils to form HOAC nearly doubled the size of the lodge. In 1989, the Tamegonit Lodge Great House was dedicated at Naish, reaffirming the lodge in the HOAC.

=== Anniversaries ===
1964- 25th anniversary, 1989- 50th anniversary, 2014- 75th anniversary

From 2013-2015, Tamegonit Lodge was the largest in the nation, and inducted its first youth female arrowman in 2019 during a special winter election.

== See also ==
- Scouting in Missouri
