= Chief Scout Executive =

Professional head of Scouting America

- Owner: Scouting America
- Founded: November 28, 1911
- Incumbent: Roger Krone

The Chief Scout Executive is the president and chief executive officer of Scouting America. The office holder is a member of the organization’s professional staff and is responsible for its management and operations.

Roger Krone is the current chief scout executive, succeeding Roger Mosby after his retirement in November 2023. Krone is the first chief scout executive appointed after the organization emerged from bankruptcy.

== History ==
Edgar M. Robinson was the YMCA's first International Secretary for Boys' Work and had written an article in the national YMCA's magazine praising the Scouting program in use at many YMCA's in the country. He saw the need to help William D. Boyce with the organization of Scouting America, met with Boyce on May 3, 1910, and agreed to help Boyce organize Scouting America’s national leadership at its June meeting. He recommended John Alexander, another YMCA executive, be appointed the managing secretary, and Alexander served in that role from June until the end of the year, when the national executive board appointed James E. West to that position, effective January 1911. West took on the position initially for a sixth month period, settled into the role, and assumed the new position of chief scout executive by agreement with the board in November 1911.

As of 2025, there have been 15 men who have served in the position of chief scout executive during the history of Scouting America. All other professional Scouters and employees of the National Council work under the direction of the chief scout executive.

During the history of Scouting America, the sitting chief scout executive has during some periods appointed a deputy chief scout executive and/or one or more assistant chief scout executives. In most cases, these men reported directly to the CSE, but in some cases, an assistant CSE worked under the direction of the deputy CSE. Although the deputy CSE has normally been considered the chief scout executive’s right hand man, there is not an automatic succession to the top position, which has been filled by appointment by a committee of the national executive board on each occasion that a new chief scout executive was needed.

This position should not be confused with the position of Chief Scout. Many national Scout associations still use this position, however, it is always for a volunteer position, not a paid one. In Scouting America, only three people (Ernest Thompson Seton, James E. West and Elbert K. Fretwell) have held the position of Chief Scout, which is separate and distinct from the position of Chief Scout Executive.

== List of chief scout executives ==
Chief Scout Executive
Number	Name	Start	End	Eagle Scout	DESA	Silver Buffalo	OA DSA	Bronze Wolf
1	James E. West	1911	1943			1926	1940	
2	Elbert K. Fretwell	1943	1948			1938		
3	Arthur A. Schuck	1948	1960			1950	1942	1960
4	Joseph A. Brunton, Jr.	1960	1967	1918	1969	1973	1946	1967
5	Alden G. Barber	1967	1976	1933	1969		1975	1975
6	Harvey L. Price	1976	1979	1929	1977		1977	
7	James L. Tarr	1979	1984	1935	1979		1979	1983
8	Ben H. Love	1985	1993				1986	1990
9	Jere B. Ratcliffe	1993	2000	1955	1991		1998	1997
10	Roy Williams	2000	2007				2000	
11	Bob Mazzuca	2007	2012	1964	2009		2009	
12	Wayne Brock	2012	2015	1965	2009		2009	
13	Michael B. Surbaugh	2015	2019	1976	2017		2018	
14	Roger Mosby	2019	2023					2021
15	Roger Krone	2023	-	1973	2015			

=== Deputies ===
Deputy chief scout executives
Start	End	Name
1919	1943	George J. Fisher
1943	1944	Perry A. Lint
1945	1960	Pliny Hunnicut Powers
1980s?	?	M. Gene Cruse
1992	?	Ronald Moranville
1996	2000	C. Michael Hoover Jr.
2009	2012	Wayne Brock
2013	2015	Gary Butler

=== Assistants ===
Assistant chief scouts executive
Start	End	Name
1931	1943	Arthur A. Schuck
1951	1952	James P. Fitch
1957	1962	Charles M. Heistand
1961	?	Robert L. Billington
1963	1968	Marsh M. Ammerman
1970	?	Marshall Monroe
1999	2006	David J. Ross II
2001	2006	Kenneth Connelly
2006	2007	Bob Mazzuca, was promoted to Chief Scout Executive
2006	2011	James Terry
2006	2009	Wayne Brock, was promoted to Deputy Chief Scout Executive
2010	2013	Gary Butler, was promoted to Deputy Chief Scout Executive
2010	2019	Brad Farmer
2011	2015	Alf Tuggle
2016	2017	Don McChesney (National Director of Field Service)
2017	2020	Mark Logemann (National Director of Support Services)
2017	2022	Patrick Sterrett (National Director of Field Service 2017. Executive Vice President - High Aventure Bases and General Manager of Summit Bechtel Reserve 2019-2022.)
2017	2020	Al Lambert (National Director of Outdoor Adventures)
2019	present	John Mosby

== See also ==
- National Executive Board of the Boy Scouts of America
