= Professional Scouter (Boy Scouts of America) =

- Owner: Boy Scouts of America
- Created: 1911-11-28

The Boy Scouts of America is an organization run by volunteers; however, the day-to-day administration is performed by a staff of professional (or career) Scouters. The organization has professional staffing at every level: district, council, regional and national. The Chief Scout Executive is the top professional Scouter.

The commissioner position is the second oldest position in Scouting (Scoutmaster is the oldest) and is the origin of the professional Scouting positions, which is why position insignia of the professional Scouter have the wreath of service as a feature on all professional position patches.

In the earliest days of the BSA, some commissioners were paid by local benefactors and supporters to administer and "grow Scouting" on a daily basis. This was because as the program expanded and more Scout Troops were formed, the capabilities and abilities of the volunteer commissioner to devote time and effort away from their primary work to make Scouting work was stressed. These first "Scout executive commissioners" (shortened to "Scout executives") were critical in expanding the BSA's outreach in urban and rural areas around the nation and eventually were under the direction of James E. West, the BSA's first national Chief Scout Executive.

== Background ==
On January 24, 1908, the Boy Scouts movement begins in England with the publication of the first installment of Robert Baden-Powell’s Scouting for Boys. Baden-Powell then went on to make his idea of Scouting a worldwide trend. By the end of 1908, there were more than 60,000 young men “enrolled” in the organization. By 1910, the Boy Scouts of America had officially become established as a trendy organization for young boys both in and out of England.

Shortly after the BSA was fully operational, there became a need for adults willing to run the organization. From this point on, adults have been in the background, behind the scenes, making sure everything is running as smoothly as possible for the organization.

== Qualifications ==
The basic qualifications to be a professional are:

- Bachelor's degree from an accredited college or university
- United States citizenship or declared intention to become a U.S. citizen
- Adult—must have attained age 21 unless prohibited by any applicable law
- People-oriented, having the ability to work well with adult volunteers, community and business leaders, and representatives of other organizations
- Able to work varied hours when necessary to achieve positive objectives
- Believe in the BSA and subscribe to its principles and standards
- Be approved to receive a professional Scouting commission

Males and females may apply and have been approved for professional service with the Boy Scouts of America.

Those who do not qualify to be a professional may be hired to serve as a paraprofessional or other employed positions within a local council, a Region or at the BSA's National Office.

== Role ==
The day-to-day work of Scouting is managed by the professional staff. Professionals spend a good part of every day cultivating future partners for various Scouting units; promoting the programs to other organizations, key businesses, key and influential individuals, and the general public. This is the core element of the professional's support to the volunteer. Since the majority of volunteers are working during their day and cannot, for instance, sit down with a corporate executive of a business, the professional does this on behalf of the district's volunteer chairperson and commissioners.

Additionally, professionals are tasked with tracking and providing statistical data on the status of each unit, its volunteers and youth members. They are responsible for ensuring that units have the appropriate level of support — training, administration and leadership. They work with existing chartered partner organizations to ensure that they are using the BSA's programs in connection with their agreement with the local council to do so. A great deal of each professional's day is spent in raising awareness and financial support for the local council, and in return, for the Boy Scouts of America. While many people have some concept of what Scouting is, the professional member — assisted in many cases by key volunteers — spends time explaining the importance of Scouting and how the BSA executes its aims of responsible and practical citizenship, personal and moral character, and physical and mental fitness.

Many will say that "volunteers — in particular commissioners — do many of these things" and in some locations, especially localities whereby professional support is short, they MUST do many of the tasks of professionals. However, the BSA feels that without that man or woman "carrying the heavy rocks" for their volunteers, the BSA would be a program with limited volunteers, all trying to do "everything" and end up achieving very little progress toward keeping the programs active, and expanding the movement to youth members who need what Scouting provides.

== Local councils ==
The professional staff in local BSA councils consists of one or more commissioned BSA professionals. Smaller councils usually have three to five professionals, medium-sized councils have six or more professionals, and the largest councils may have 20 or more professionals. All professional Scouters are considered "exempt" employees according to the standards of the Fair Labor Standards Act and are salaried rather than paid by hourly wage. Most councils have a similar number of support staff and camp rangers who are "non-exempt" employees whose duties are very job-specific, limited to standard hours or equivalent labor rules, and paid by hourly wage. The BSA greatly values these non-exempt employees but does not include their positions in the classifications of professional Scouters.

=== Interim field employees ===
In some Councils, the hiring of a full-time executive is difficult. The BSA has authorized those Councils to hire part-time employees, called paraprofessionals, to assist local volunteers with a level of Council support. These men and women are supervised generally by a district or field director, and many of these individuals are hired as district executives or associate district executives upon completion of college and participation in the BSA's field executive training course.

=== District executives, other entry-level professionals, and second-level professionals ===
The Scouting professional who supports the work of volunteers in a district of a local council is the district executive (D.E.). District executives are hired and serve initially as professional trainees until graduation from the BSA National Council District Operations Basic Level 1 (DOB-1) training. Similar entry-level professionals who are assigned to work in Learning for Life divisions strictly with Explorer posts or Learning for Life programs are known as Exploring executives or Learning for Life executives and may have completed a specialized training that is parallel to the DOB-1. DOB-1 is followed by a second training known as District Operations Level 2 (DO2). After 2 years or 30 months of successful tenure, a District Executive (or equivalent) may be promoted to senior district executive (or Learning for Life equivalent), with more responsibilities added to his/her current assignment, or be reassigned to a larger district with other new responsibilities. All of these positions working in districts or divisions are classified as unit-serving executives (often abbreviated as U.S.E.). Some larger districts may hire entry-level professionals as associate district executive (A.D.E.).

In a few cases, a district executive may be promoted directly to a specialized role such as finance director to focus on fund-raising or program director to oversee camp operations and other council program support work. Some larger councils have other similar specialized positions which do not involve supervising other professionals. These specialized roles are usually filled by BSA commissioned professionals, and the specialized positions are not counted as Unit-Serving Executives.

=== Field management ===
Experienced professions may be promoted to a manager of professionals in one or more districts. The district director maintains the lead role in one district. In districts assigned a lead district executive, the position is called a field director. The term 'field' goes back to the early days of Scouting when 'field executives' worked for the Scout Executive but were not permanently assigned to any district, and all work directly with BSA chartered organizations and units was called then (and still is today) 'field work'. District directors typically are responsible 1 to 3 districts, and field directors are typically responsible for 3 to 5 districts. Because district directors and field directors are usually deeply involved in district operation and working with unit leaders, they are also counted as unit-serving executives.

=== Senior-level management ===
In the larger councils with more than one field director or district director, the council scout executive usually appoints a director of field service (DFS) to manage the field managers and possibly other professionals, and usually to serve as the de facto assistant scout executive. In medium-sized councils without field directors, this role usually retains the title of assistant scout executive, and often includes responsibility for program support and other special functions.

Also in larger councils, similar to the director of field service may be other senior-level professionals. The director of finance service would manage at least one finance director and be responsible for the council fund-raising efforts. The director of support service would manage a camping director, program director, and/or other specialized professionals and be responsible for council functions separate from the field managers.

Each of these senior-level positions is usually (but not absolutely) a prerequisite to promotion to a council Scout Executive or national council staff position.

== Scout executives ==
Scout executives are the executive directors of the 242 local councils, and must be commissioned professional Scouters with considerable experience. Each scout executive has been selected by a volunteer committee of the council executive board from a pool of three to six candidates provided by the National Council. According to the BSA's Rules and Regulations, the Scout executive may not be promoted from the council's professional staff that he/she would be supervising if appointed, but instead come from another council or the national council staff. The scout executive normally serves a minimum of four years, and at the continued satisfaction of the council executive board. In addition to management responsibilities, the Scout executive is the corporate secretary of the council, and the principal spokesperson to the local communities of the council. In many cases, the council executive board will refer to the Scout executive as its chief executive officer.

Council scout executives are men and women who have served the BSA as professionals for 10 or more years and in some cases 20 to 30 years. Since the 1980s, a number of women have risen through the BSA professional ranks, and there are at least seven women professionals serving in the scout executive position as of 2011.

== National Council professional staff ==
Regions and areas are subdivisions of the National Council and do not have a corporate status separate from the BSA. Each region is led by the regional director who is a member of the National Council leadership team. The regional director has responsibility for the success of Scouting in his/her region, and works with an elected volunteer board representing the 55 to 70 councils in that region. The primary day-to-day role of the region is to support local council operations through the work of five to seven area directors who each serve as a field supervisor to the various local council Scout executives within his/her Area (a group of 6 to 12 councils in a geographic area consisting of a portion of one or more states). Each region also has 2 or 3 associate regional directors and a small support staff.

The National Council is staffed by professionals and support staff working under the direction of the Chief Scout Executive, the majority of whom have worked in local councils... The Chief Scout Executive is selected by a special committee of the National Executive Board, usually from candidates who have worked in multiple council Scout executive positions and one or more senior national leadership roles. The Chief Scout Executive is the BSA chief executive officer responsible for all day-to-day operations of the BSA and senior manager of all national and regional staff, and serves at the continued satisfaction of the National Executive Board.
