= Original 57 merit badges (Boy Scouts of America) =

1911 awards issued by American youth organization

Original 57 merit badges of the Boy Scouts of America

In 1911, 57 merit badges were issued by the Boy Scouts of America. Many of them exist to this day and are listed below in green. Many of the others have been discontinued or reintroduced with different names. Of the discontinued original merit badges, four were offered in 2010 as part of the Boy Scouts of America centennial. These merit badges are listed in beige.

Soon after the introduction of merit badges, the ranks of Life, Star, and Eagle were created to recognize the earning of merit badges; Star was moved before Life in 1924.

== Original merit badges ==
Merit badge	Subject matter	Original Logo	Status
Agriculture	Agriculture	Plow	Merged into Plant Science, 1975
Angling	Angling, Fishing	Fish	Renamed Fishing in 1952
Archery	Archery	Bow and Arrow	
Architecture	Architecture	Arch	Logo used continuously for 100 years
Art	Art	Palette	Logo used continuously for 100 years
Astronomy	Astronomy	Star	
Athletics	Athletics	Wingfoot	Logo used continuously for 100 years
Automobiling	Automobile safety	Red Wheel	Exists today as Traffic Safety
Aviation	Aviation	Airplane	
Bee Farming	Beekeeping	Bee	Discontinued 1995
Blacksmithing	Blacksmithing	Anvil	Replaced by metalworking
Bugling	Bugling	Bugle	Logo used continuously for 100 years
Business	Business	Crossed quills	Renamed American Business in 1966.
Camping	Camping	Tepee	
Carpentry	Carpentry	Plane	Partially replaced by Woodwork, 1952. Carpentry introduced again in 2010 as historic merit badge.
Chemistry	Chemistry	Retort flask	Logo used continuously for 100 years
Civics	Citizenship	Faces	Renamed Citizenship, later split into Home, Community, Nation, and World
Conservation	Conservation	Forest	Exists today as Fish and Wildlife Management and Environmental Science
Cooking	Cooking	Cooking utensils	
Craftsmanship	Artisan	Calipers	Split into various Building and Handicraft merit badges
Cycling	Cycling	White Wheel	
Dairying	Dairy farming	Butter Churn	Merged into Animal Science, 1975
Electricity	Electricity	Lightning Bolt	Logo used continuously for 100 years
Firemanship	Fire safety	Crossed nozzles	Renamed Fire Safety in 1995
First Aid	First aid	Cross	Logo used continuously for 100 years
First Aid to Animals	Veterinary medicine	Cross w/Dog	Renamed Veterinary Medicine
Forestry	Forestry	Pine Cone	
Gardening	Gardening	Ear of Corn	
Handicraft	Handicraft	Hammer and Plunger	Split into various Building and Handicraft merit badges
Horsemanship	Equestrianism	Horseshoe	
Interpreting	Interpreting	Handshake	Discontinued 1952
Invention	Inventing	Gear	Discontinued 1915
Leatherworking	Leatherworking	Leather Stamp	Renamed Leatherwork
Lifesaving	Lifesaving	Life preserver	Logo used continuously for 100 years
Machinery	Machinery	Wrench	Discontinued 1995
Marksmanship	Shooting	Target	Split into Rifle Shooting and Shotgun Shooting
Masonry	Masonry	Trowel	Discontinued in 1995
Mining	Mining	Shovel	Renamed Geology
Music	Music	Lyre	Logo used continuously for 100 years
Ornithology	Ornithology	Hummingbird	Was originally required for Eagle, replaced by Bird Study
Painting	Paint	Paintbrush	Logo used continuously for 100 years
Pathfinding	Orienteering	Indian Head	Replaced by Orienteering. Introduced again in 2010 as historic merit badge.
Personal Health	Physical Fitness	Heart	Replaced by Personal Fitness in 1952
Photography	Photography	Camera	
Pioneering	Pioneering	Pick and Ax	
Plumbing	Plumbing	Faucet	Logo used continuously for 100 years
Poultry Farming	Poultry	Rooster	Merged into Animal Science, 1975
Printing	Printing	Printing Press	Merged into Graphic Arts, 1987
Public Health	Public Health	Torch	Logo used continuously for 100 years
Scholarship	Scholarship	Torch & Book	Logo used continuously for 100 years
Sculpture	Sculpture	Head	
Seamanship	Boating	Anchor	Split into Motorboating and Small Boat Sailing, 1964
Signaling	Semaphore	Semaphore Flags	Discontinued in 1992. Introduced again in 2010 as historic merit badge. Reinstated again in 2015 as Signs, Signals, and Codes
Stalking	Tracking	Raccoon	Discontinued 1952. Introduced again in 2010 as historic merit badge, and renamed Tracking
Surveying	Surveying	Telescope	
Swimming	Human swimming	Man Swimming	
Taxidermy	Taxidermy	Talon	Discontinued in 1952

== See also ==
- Merit badge (Boy Scouts of America)
- History of merit badges (Boy Scouts of America)
- Discontinued merit badges (Boy Scouts of America)
