= 2005 National Scout Jamboree =

16th national Scout jamboree

- Location: Fort A.P. Hill, Virginia
- Country: United States
- Date: July 25, 2005 – August 3, 2005
- Attendance: 31,700 Scouts

The 2005 National Scout Jamboree was the 16th national Scout jamboree of the Boy Scouts of America and was held from July 25, 2005 through August 3, 2005 at Fort A.P. Hill, Virginia. Normally, the next jamboree would be held four years afterward in 2009, but the date was changed so that the next jamboree could take place in 2010, the centennial anniversary of Scouting in the United States.

== Statistics ==
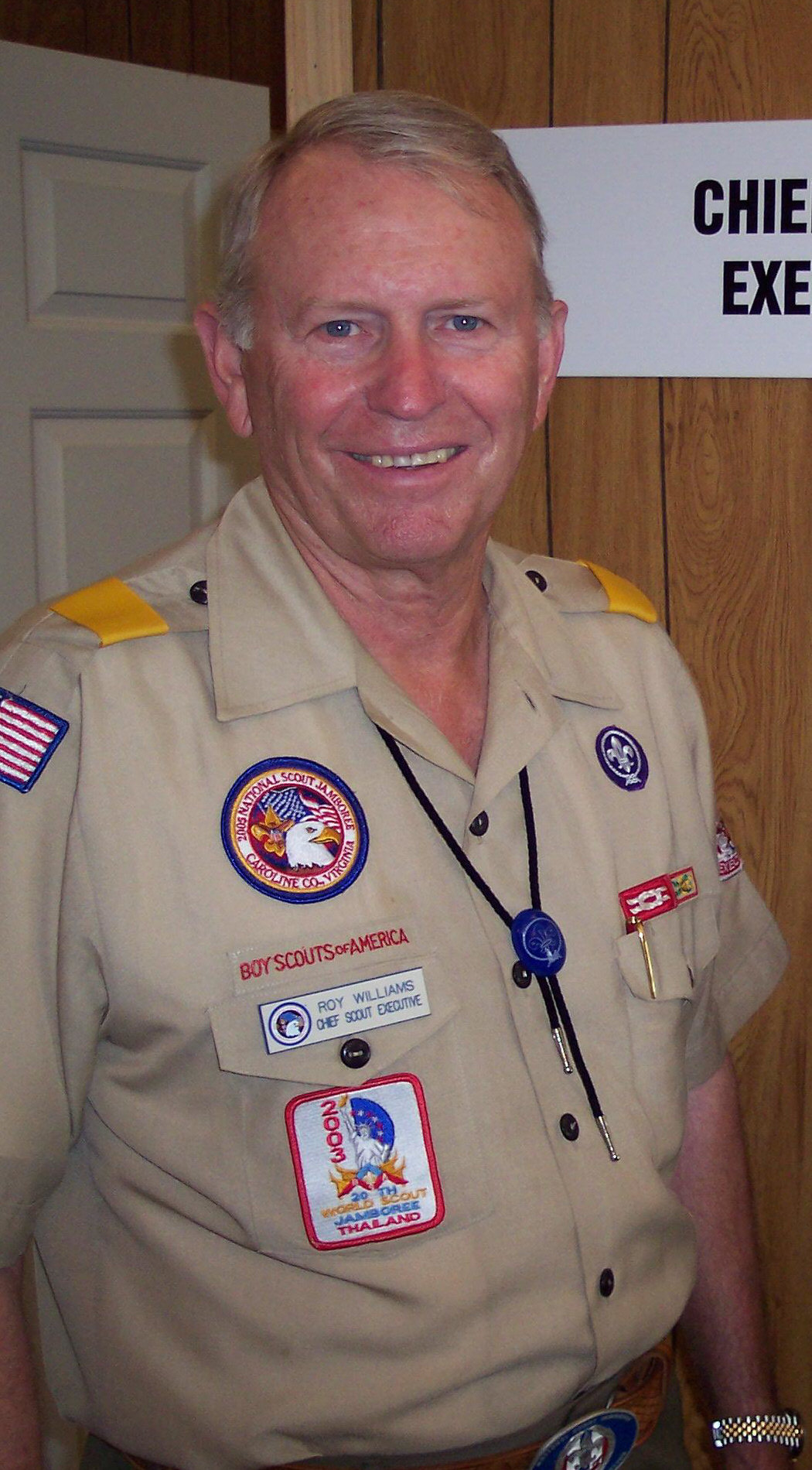
Then Chief Scout Executive Roy Williams

- Over 31,700 Youth attended, making up the 883 jamboree Troops present.
- Scouts from 26 Nations attended.
- More than 7,000 adults volunteered to provide support and program services.
- Each jamboree troop was made up of 36 youth, consisting of 4 patrols of 8 scouts, and 4 youth leaders (senior patrol leader, assistant senior patrol leader, quartermaster and scribe) selected from various units in their local council.
- For the 10-day event Caroline County went from the 50th most populated county in Virginia to the 14th.

== Sub-camps ==
The 2005 National Scout Jamboree was divided into 20 sub-camps, named after living American explorers. The subcamps were then grouped into four Regions.

Northeast

- 1: William I. Koch; Troops 0100–0199
- 2: Dr. S. Allen Counter; Troops 0200–0299
- 3: Steven W. Squyres; Troops 0300–0399
- 4: José I. Castro; Troops 0400–0499
- 5: Michael Manyak; Troops 0500–0599

Western

- 6: Steve Fossett; Troops 0600–0699
- 7: Ken Kamler; Troops 0700–0799
- 8: James A. Lovell; Troops 0800–0899
- 9: Jim Whittaker; Troops 0900–0999

Central

- 10: Jim Fowler; Troops 1000–1099
- 11: Scott Carpenter; Troops 1100–1199
- 12: James Dewey Watson; Troops 1200–1299
- 13: Don Walsh; Troops 1300–1399
- 14: Richard C. Wiese; Troops 1400–1499

Southern

- 15: Robert Ballard; Troops 1500–1599
- 16: Richard Wiese Sr; Troops 1600–1699
- 17: Donald C. Johanson; Troops 1700–1799
- 18: William Forgey; Troops 1800–1899
- 19: Joseph Kittinger Jr.; Troops 1900–1999
- 20: Will Steger; Troops 2000–2099

== Arena Shows ==
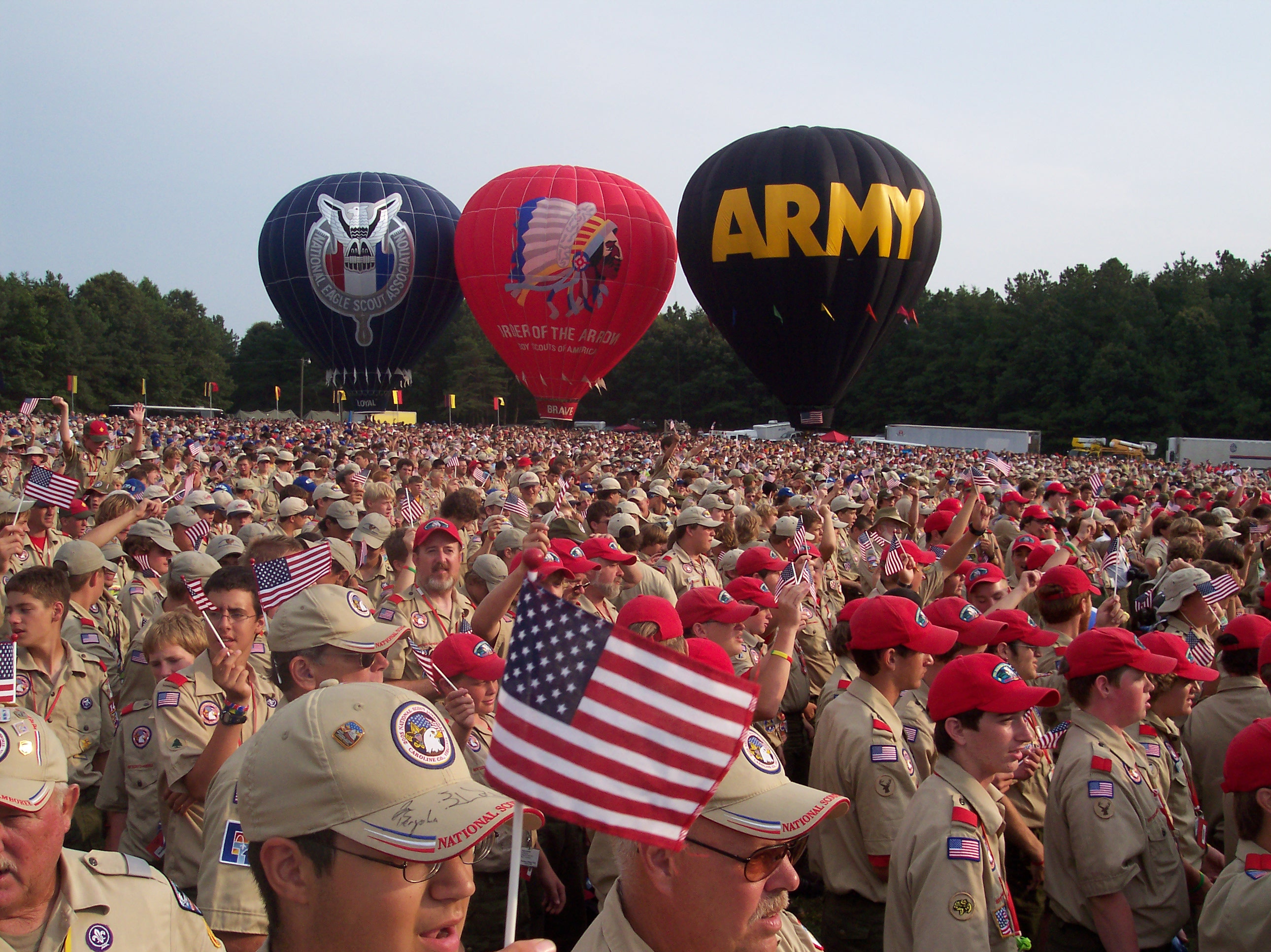
View of the audience at the Arena Show

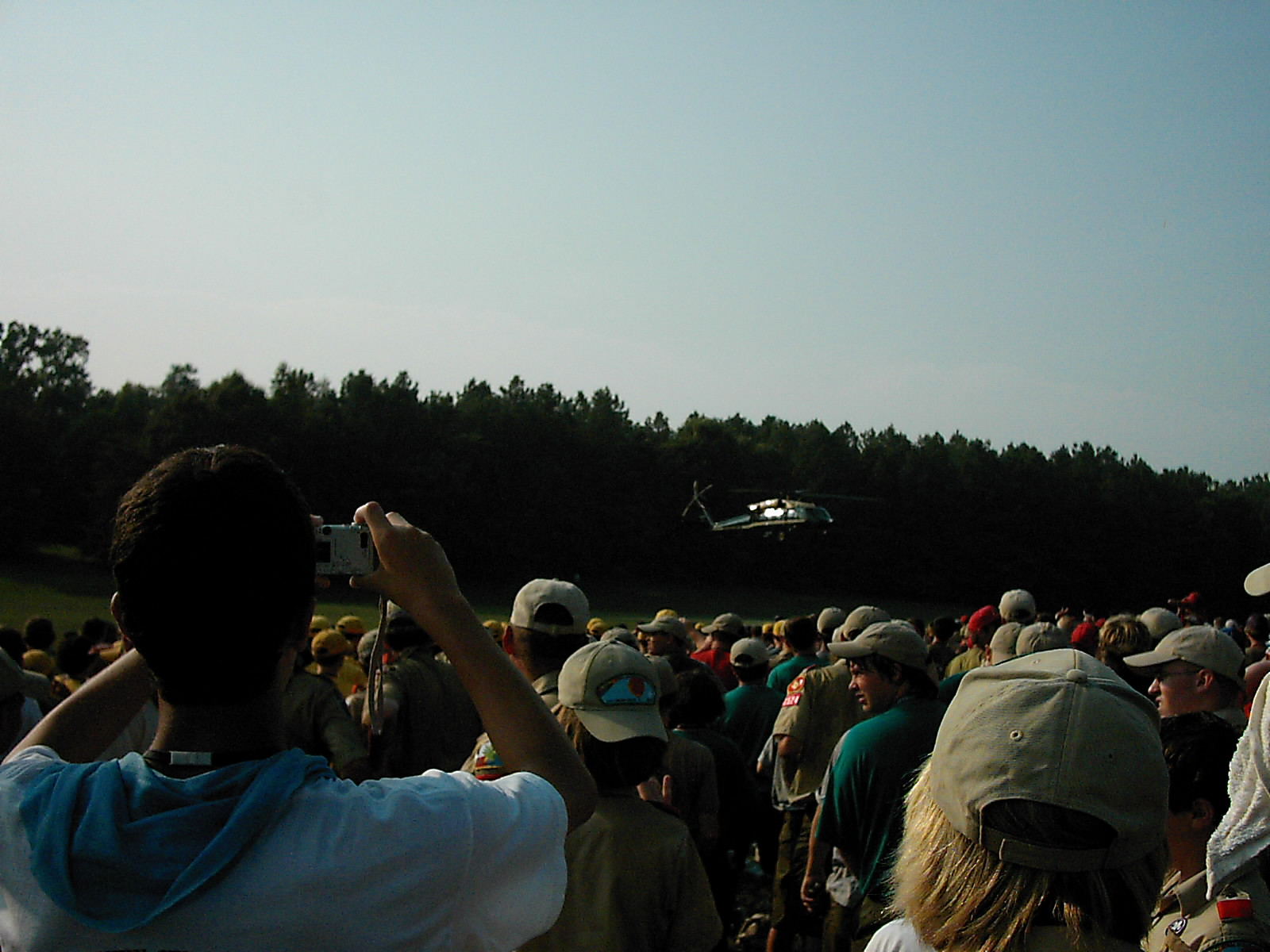
Helicopter arriving at the Arena Show

Three Arena Shows were planned to be held during the jamboree. Allan Gibbs was the director of Arena Operations.

The first Arena Show was held on July 27, 2005. The first show was a staff show, and a youth arena staff member served as MC. The show also featured a staff barbecue and a speech from the Chief Scout Executive, as well as a preview for what was to come during the rest of the week.

President George W. Bush was scheduled to attend the second show, along with Senator Bill Frist, but was not able to attend due to impending thunderstorms expected to hit about the time of the show or shortly after. However, Frist was already en route to the show when it was canceled and consequently delivered his speech. He emphasized the "Support our Scouts" bill recently passed in the Senate. A number of participants and staff members were treated for heat exhaustion and heat stroke while Frist was delivering his speech—at one point, his voice was competing with a helicopter airlifting one victim to a nearby hospital. Part of the problem arose due to a lack of drinking water. Due to security for the President's visit, those entering the amphitheater were not permitted to bring any liquid through the security checkpoints (among other restrictions). There were several water buffalos provided by the Army, but long lines to refill empty bottles dissuaded many from filling their bottles. The second show was finally canceled due to extreme temperatures. It also began to rain heavily as Scouts returned to their campsites. The trip to and from the second arena show earned the moniker "the death march" among scouts attending the jamboree due to the distances scouts were required to travel in extreme heat, from the Bataan Death March experienced by American POWs in the Pacific theater of WWII. About 300 Boy Scouts were treated for heat exhaustion after waiting for President Bush to arrive at a memorial service for four Scout leaders who were killed while pitching a tent beneath a power line.

The final show set a jamboree record for the most attendance. President Bush did speak at the third show regarding the importance of Scouting. Jim Fowler, as well as other numerous dignitaries visited and spoke during the closing show. There was to be a two-part presentation about "exploration" with part one taking place during the second arena show. Since it was canceled the two parts were combined into one. The premise was that "Scouts" were on a journey of exploration, but it was apparent that the "Scouts" were just second-rate actors. When the audience grew restless over the lame production it was decided to terminate that part of the program. The arena show concluded with both a laser show (originally scheduled for the first show, using music from Epcot's IllumiNations: Reflections of Earth), and a fireworks show.

== Rockers ==
2005 National Scout Jamboree badge with rockers

At the jamboree, Scouts had the chance to earn five activity patch segments, called rockers, to place on their uniform around the jamboree patch. To earn each rocker, Scouts had to complete certain requirements over the course of the 10-day jamboree. The rockers essentially encouraged the Scouts to see as much of the jamboree as possible. The five rocker segments are Action Centers, Outback Centers, Activities, Duty to God and the 5-K run.

=== Action Centers ===
Scouts had to participate in 8 of the following 10 events found in each region's Action center.

- Action Alley- A Full Obstacle course including Zipline, Giant's Ladder and Army Hurdles.
- Air-Rifle Shooting- An Air rifle safety and Technique course followed by target practice.
- Archery- An Archery safety and Technique course followed by target practice.
- Bikathalon- A cross country course ridden on mountain bikes with air rifle target shooting stations.
- Buckskin Games- 19th century competitive activities including use of muzzleloading guns, tomahawk throwing, knife throwing, bucking bronco event, bullwhip cracking and branding.
- Confidence Course- A series of low course COPE (Challenging Outdoor Personal Experience) activities.
- Motocross- Bicycle racing over an obstacle laden course.
- Mountain Boarding- A cross between snowboarding and skateboarding that has scouts riding mountainboards down hills.
- Pioneering- A series of activities where Patrols use pioneering skills to move objects, build structures and play games.
- Rappelling Tower
- Trapshooting- A shotgun safety and Technique course followed by target practice.

=== Outback Centers ===
Scouts had to participate in 4 of the 9 Outback Center activities.

- Canoe Slalom- A timed canoe course through slalom gates.
- Canoe Sprint- A timed canoe course through buoys.
- Conservation- A hands on experience in conservation techniques.
- Discover Scuba- Instruction in Scuba.
- Fishing- Scouts got a chance to fish in a lake stocked with more than 20,000 bass, channel catfish and crappie among other fish.
- Kayak Fun- A class to learn basic kayaking skills, and a timed course.
- Racing Shell Run- Two scout crews race in lightweight racing shells.
- Raft Encounter
- Snorkel Search- A Snorkeling scavenger hunt.

=== Activities ===
Scouts had to visit 5 of the 9 Activities in the exhibits and display section.

- American Indian Village- presented by the Order of the Arrow, it taught and displayed Indian Dance, crafts and games.
- QBSA- The jamboree radio station where scouts could sign up to DJ on a live broadcast.
- America's First Scout Camp- A recreation of America's first scout camp at Silver Bay, New York, started in 1910.
- Merit Badge Midway- A midway filled with close to a hundred booths offering many different merit badges, many of which could be earned entirely on site.
- K2BSA- Amateur radio operators were able to use amateur radio equipment to communicate with other amateur radio stations across the country and the world. Scouts also had the opportunity to earn their amateur radio license here.
- Arts and Science Expo- Two exhibits of entries in the Arts and Sciences, submitted by youth attending the jamboree.
- National Exhibits- Exhibits presented by several National associations, the Armed Services and Federal Agencies.
- Brownsea Island Camp- A recreation of the first Boy Scout camp, started by Baden-Powell in 1907 in England.
- The Outdoor Adventure Place (TOAP)- A series of events to test scouts' camping skills.
- disAbilities Awareness- Hands on activated conducted to improve awareness about the challenges disabled persons face.
- Venturing Underground- The exhibit of the Venturing program that sent boys far underground for a tour of an abandoned coal mine.

=== Duty To God ===
Scouts had to complete the following requirements:

- Attend a Religious Service
- Take Part in 3 religious devotionals found in the 2005 Scout Guide.
- Visit the Religious Relationships exhibit.
- Lead in Grace before a patrol meal.
- Meet your Sub-camp Chaplain.

=== 5-K Run ===
Scouts had to complete a 5 Kilometer Run/Walk. United States Surgeon General Richard Carmona took part in this run.

== Deaths ==
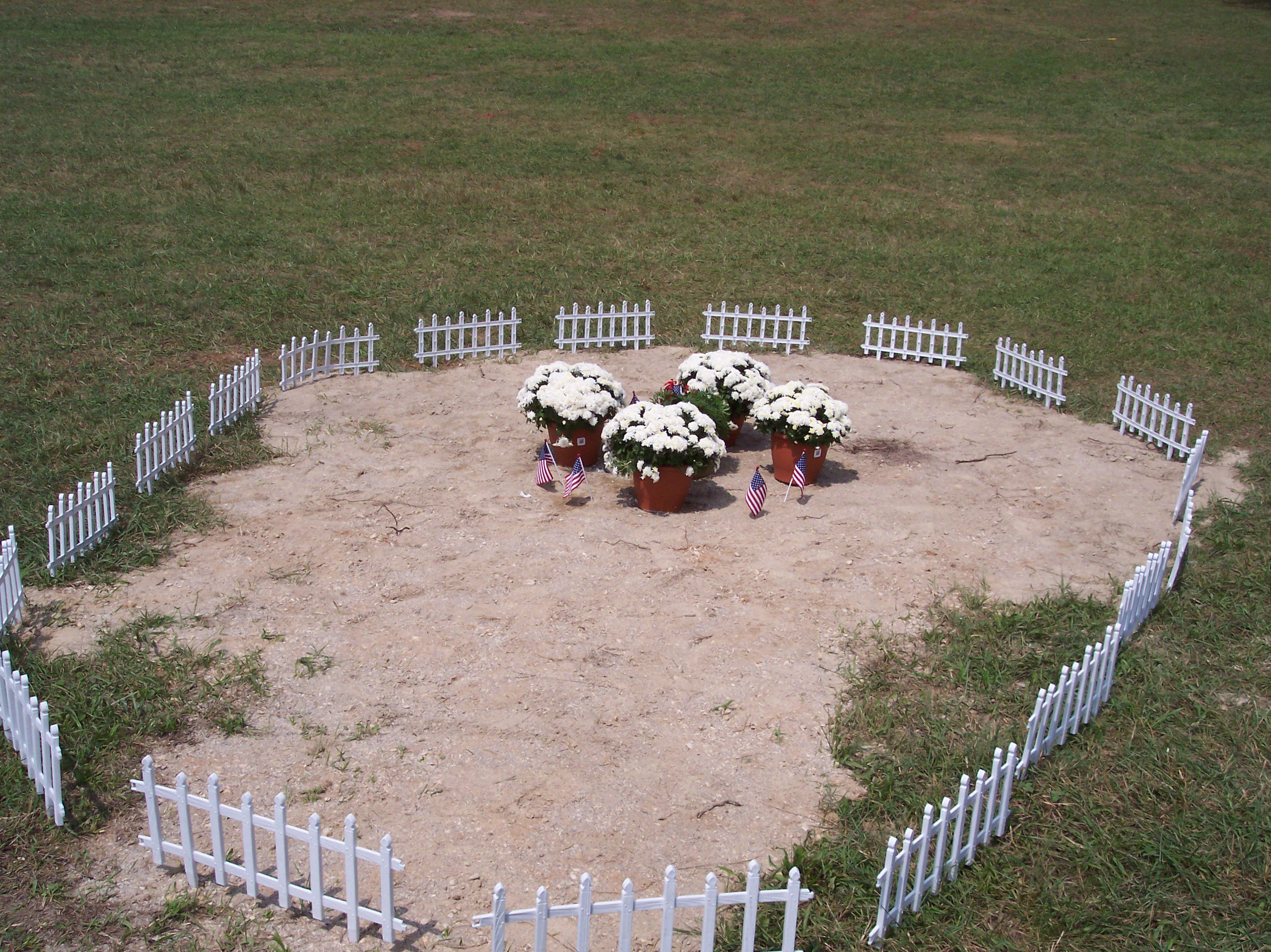
Memorial set up at the site of the disaster

Contractors were hired to assist in the setting up of a large tent in one of the sub-camps at the Jamboree. Some of the adult scout leaders assisted the contractors in setting the poles. Due to the zoning and the length of the pole, the pole made contact with an electric cable. Those that were killed were: Michal J. Shibe from Troop 129, Mike LaCroix from Troop 711, Ronald Bitzer from Troop 129, and Scott Edward Powell. Scott Powell was the Scout Camp Leader at Camp Gorsuch in Chugiak, Alaska and had recently retired to Perrysville, Ohio. Mike Shibe had two sons at the Jamboree and LaCroix had one.
