= History of merit badges (Scouting America) =

Merit badge
- Owner: Scouting America
- Created: 1910

The history of merit badges in Scouting America has been tracked by categorizing them into a series of merit badge types. In addition to Scouting America, many other Scouting and Scouting-like organizations around the world, such as Pathfinders, Baden-Powell Scouts and Royal Rangers, issue merit badges or their equivalent; though they are sometimes called honors or proficiency badges. Other organizations, such as fire brigades, issue badges or awards that they refer to as merit badges, but that is in some respects different from the badges awarded by Scouting America.

Merit badges has been an integral part of the Scouting program since the start of the movement in the United Kingdom on August 1, 1907, and is an important part of the uniform and insignia of Scouts BSA. Scouting came to the United States in 1910; Scouting America quickly issued an initial list of just 14 merit badges but did not produce or award them. In 1911, Scouting America manufactured the first official 57 merit badges and began awarding them. The number of badges available has been as high as 127 in 1975 and again in 1987. As of February 2017, the number of badges available is 137. Merit badge types are identifiable by the cloth and manufacturing process used to make them. The classification of badges into types came about as a way for collectors to categorize and classify their collections. Merit badge collectors often collect other Scouting memorabilia as well.

== Purpose of merit badges ==
Merit badges exist to encourage Scouts to explore areas that interest them and to teach them valuable skills in Scoutcraft. The award of merit badges sometimes leads to careers and lifelong hobbies. Scouts earn a merit badge by satisfying specified criteria; a Court of Honor is then held to present the badge. Scouts can earn badges at any point in their Scouting career, although this was not always the case — in the 1960s, Scouts first had to earn the rank of First Class before being allowed to work on and earn badges. The higher ranks of Star, Life, and Eagle require merit badges be earned. Certain badges are mandatory to receive these higher ranks. For a few years during the 1980s and 90s, First Aid merit badge was a requirement for the First Class rank. Other mandatory badges include Citizenship in the Community and Environmental Science (see full list). The number of merit badges required for each of these higher ranks has varied historically, as has the ratio of mandatory merit badges and non-mandatory badges for those ranks. Since 2005, Scouts must earn a total of 21 merit badges for the Eagle Scout rank, 14 of which must be from the mandatory list. Once Scouts attain the Eagle rank, they can earn Eagle Palms, a core requirement of which is earning more merit badges.

== Badge history ==
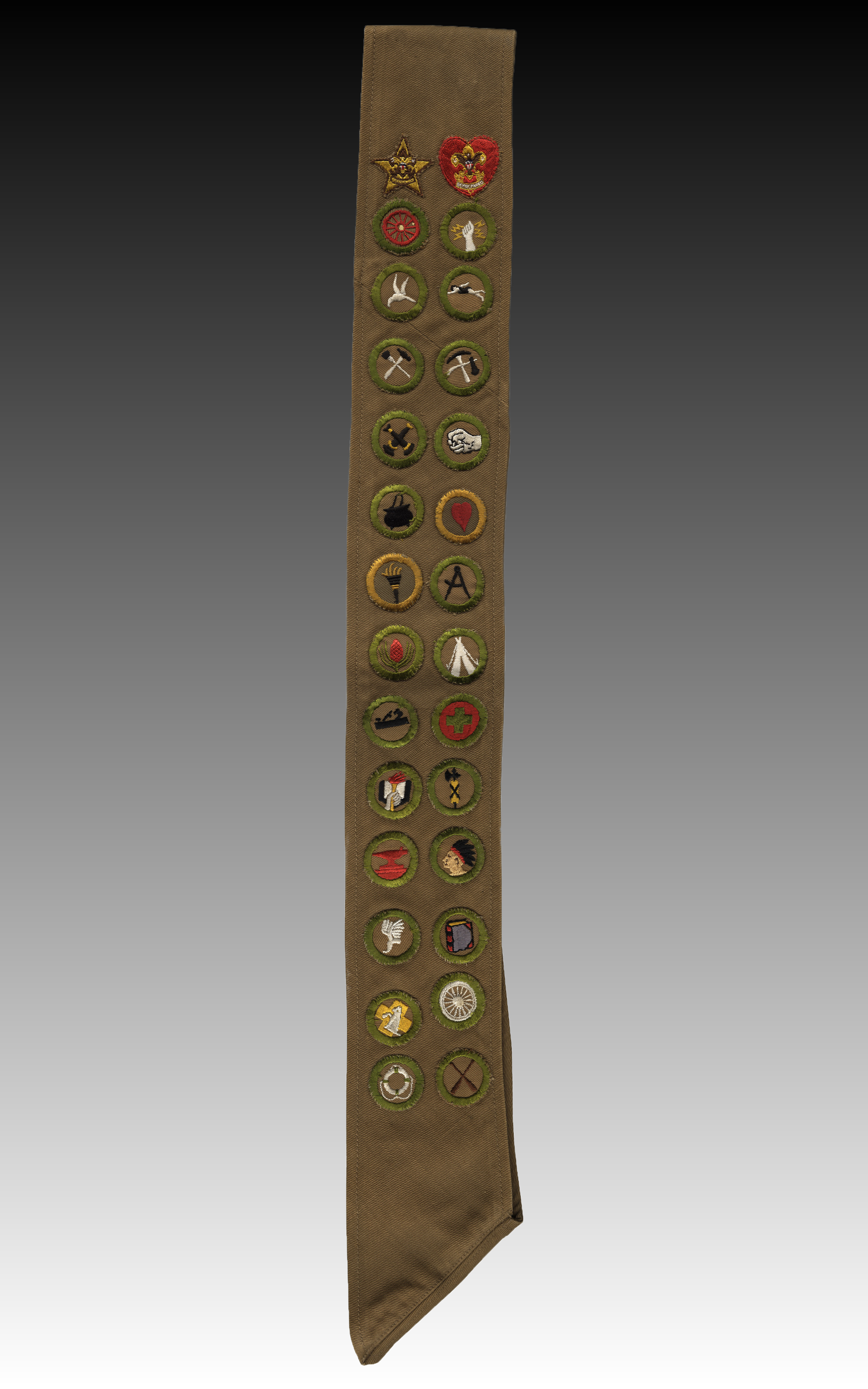
A Boy Scout merit badge sash from the 1920s

The BSA changes the design, name, and availability of merit badges depending on various factors such as their popularity, shifts in the focus of the Scouting program, and changes in society. Of the original 57 merit badges from 1911, only 11 are still available that also still have the same basic design motif (Architecture, Art, Athletics, Chemistry, First Aid, Lifesaving, Music, Plumbing, Public Health, Scholarship, and Surveying). Of those 11, only five were made available in each "generation" of the 10 merit badge types (these are Architecture, Art, Chemistry, Plumbing, and Public Health). The remaining six were not reproduced in a short-lived "generation" of merit badges, Type I. There are another 21 merit badges still available that are essentially the same as 1911 merit badges but with different designs: American Business (was Business), Archery, Astronomy, Aviation, Bird Study (was Ornithology), Bugling, Camping, Cooking, Cycling, Electricity, Fire Safety (was Firemanship), Fishing (was Angling), Forestry, Gardening, Horsemanship, Painting, Photography, Pioneering, Sculpture, Small Boat Sailing (was Seamanship), and Swimming.

Examples of merit badge change due to the degree of popularity/interest in a subject include "Interpreting", which only existed from 1911 to 1952, when it was dropped; and "Genealogy" which was added in 1972 when interest in that subject increased.

An example of merit badges reflecting changes in the focus of the Scouting program is "Civics", which was originally the only citizenship-related merit badge. In 1947 the name was changed to "Citizenship." In 1952, the BSA split "Citizenship" into four separate badges, which were in turn modified several times. Since 1991, the badges in this group are "Citizenship in the Community", "Citizenship in the Nation", "Citizenship in the World", and "Family Life", all four of which are currently on the mandatory list for Eagle Scout.

The "First Aid to Animals" and "Plant Science" merit badges have both evolved due to societal changes. "First Aid to Animals" was one of the original merit badges in 1911 but was dropped in 1972. It was resurrected as "Veterinary Science" in 1973 with a focus on small pet-type animals vs. farm animals. It was renamed "Veterinary Medicine" in 1995. Merging of merit badges can be seen in "Plant Science", into which all crop growing merit badges were merged in the 1970s. Similarly, most of the merit badges related to animal husbandry were merged into "Animal Science".

The "Personal Health" merit badge was an original 1911 badge with a heart motif. It was merged with the "Physical Development" badge and was replaced in 1952 with the "Personal Fitness" badge. It was redesigned in 1969, displaying a youth in gym gear doing what appears to be a jumping jack exercise.

The merit badges on the mandatory list for Eagle Scout have changed several times; "First Aid" is the only merit badge that has always been on the mandatory list for Eagle Scout. In 1969, the BSA began manufacturing those merit badges that are required in order to obtain the rank of Eagle Scout with a silver border instead of the green border used on other merit badges. In honor of the 100th anniversary of the BSA, a historical merit badge program was announced by BSA. Scouts could earn any of the four merit badges: Carpentry, Pathfinding, Signaling, and Tracking. Each had been previously retired in 1952, except Signaling, which was discontinued in 1992. These could be used as electives for Star Scout, Life Scout, and Eagle Scout, and had to be started and completed during 2010; after which these badges would again be retired. There have been a number of discontinued merit badges over the years.

A new merit badge for Robotics was jointly announced by NASA and the Boy Scouts of America in July 2011. This new badge recognizes the importance of STEM (science, technology, engineering, and math) and the 'wide-reaching impact of robotics'. The BSA worked for 14 months to develop this new badge, collaborating with organizations such as iRobot, VEX Robotics, the Boston Museum of Science, Carnegie Mellon Robotics Academy and NASA. The BSA currently has 31 STEM-related merit badges.

== Boy Scouts who have earned all merit badges ==
There have been 621 confirmed Boy Scouts who have earned all the merit badges. The first Boy Scout to do so was Stephen Porter in 1914. The first Boy Scout to earn all the merit badges before earning his Eagle was David R. Schulze in 2004. Both of his younger brothers Lance Schulze and Aaron Schulze would follow in his footsteps making them one of four families where all three sons earned every merit badge. The other trios are the Kunz brothers from San Diego, the Pugh brothers from Ferndale, and the Weeks brothers from South Ogden. The first Boy Scout to earn all the merit badges and go on to travel to every sovereign country was Indy Nelson in 2011, with the latter achieved in 2017.

A record of Boy Scouts who have earned all available merit badges can be found at Merit Badge Knot.com. This record may be incomplete, but it is the best record currently available. Additionally, scouts who have earned all the merit badges may receive a square knot patch from Merit Badge Knot.com.

== Types of merit badges ==
According to collectors and badge historians, there have been 11 major styles of merit badges: Types A, B, C, D, E, F, G, H, I, J, and K.

=== Type A ===
Front/Reverse (Gardening)	Essential facts	Description	
	Nickname: square Years of Issue: 1911–1933	Background	Type A merit badges were manufactured in rolls and then cut into squares approximately 2 in (5.1 cm) square, hence its nickname square.
	Nickname: square Years of Issue: 1911–1933	Front	Type A badges are known for their square or rectangular-shaped cloth with circular embroidered design. During one period of time, these badges were distributed in a roll containing many badges, with each individual badge being cut from the roll. Uncut rolls are said to exist.
	Nickname: square Years of Issue: 1911–1933	Reverse	Some Type A, B, and C badges bear black watermarks or partial watermarks of the BSA emblem on the back as these were printed on the back of the rolls at certain intervals.

=== Type B ===
Front/Reverse (Public Health)	Essential facts	Description	
	Nickname: wide border Years of Issue: 1934–1935 Unusually large size	Background	Some Type B and C badges retained the same cloth color as Type A, but most came in a darker tan/brown cloth.
	Nickname: wide border Years of Issue: 1934–1935 Unusually large size	Front	Type B merit badges were the first badges to be manufactured with a smooth, round shape, which the manufacturer produced by folding the badge's edge under the back and crimping it. Type C, D, and E badges were also manufactured in this manner, hence Types B–E are referred to as crimped. Type B badges have a diameter of about 1 3/4 inches (44 mm) after crimping. Type B has a margin of 3/16 to 1/4 in (4.8 to 6.4 mm) between the edge of the badge and the embroidered green ring; because this margin is wider than in the Type C badge.
	Nickname: wide border Years of Issue: 1934–1935 Unusually large size	Reverse	As with Type A, some Type B badges bear watermarks on the back.

=== Type C ===
Front/Reverse (Civics)	Essential facts	Description	
	Nickname: narrow border, narrow tan Years of Issue: 1936–1946	Background	Type C merit badges were made from the same type of cloth as Type B badges, but were a little smaller in width.
	Nickname: narrow border, narrow tan Years of Issue: 1936–1946	Front	The diameter of a Type C badge from outer edge to the outer edge is about 1 1/2 inches (38 mm), with the distance from the crimp to the outer edge of the green ring being 1/8 in (3.2 mm). Size is the only difference in Types B and C; hence the nicknames narrow border and narrow tan. In fact, all Type C, D and E badges are the same sizes. Compare Types B and C side-by-side; the difference in the distance from the outer crimp edges to the green rings is obvious. Beginning with Type C, all merit badges have been made with a diameter of 1 1/2 inches (38 mm), except for a few Type I designs (see below). Most Type C badges were not made after 1942 (see Type D section below); only the Air Scout aviation blues, which came in four designs, were made in Type C from 1942 to 1946. These had the standard Type C cloth but were fully embroidered with blue backgrounds inside a blue ring. This is the only time badges were made with blue rings.
	Nickname: narrow border, narrow tan Years of Issue: 1936–1946	Reverse	As with Type A, some Type C badges bear watermarks on the back. Type C, D, and E merit badges all have to size on the back, which serves as a stiffener to help the badge retain its crimp.

=== Type D ===
Front/Reverse (Camping)	Essential facts	Description	
	Nickname: fine twill, sand twill Years of Issue: 1942–1946	Background	Type D merit badges were made from a lighter weight cloth with a much finer weave and lighter tan color than Type C badges because the heavier, thicker weave material that Type C badges were made from was needed to make uniforms needed during World War II. This is the only difference between a Type C and Type D.
	Nickname: fine twill, sand twill Years of Issue: 1942–1946	Front	Because of its finer weave twill material, Type D badges are called fine twill. Another name for them is sand twill because of their sandy color. The only Type C badges made during this era were the aforementioned Type C aviation–blues. Because sand twills were made such a short time many decades ago; they are rather rare.
	Nickname: fine twill, sand twill Years of Issue: 1942–1946	Reverse	As with Type C, Type D badges have to size on the back.

=== Type E ===
Front/Reverse (Dog Care)	Essential facts	Description	
	Nickname: khaki green, khaki Years of Issue: 1947–1960 Last type with crimped edges	Background	Type E merit badges were made from the same material as Type C badges, but the color is a decidedly darker green, hence the nickname khaki green. This is the only difference in Type C and Type E.
	Nickname: khaki green, khaki Years of Issue: 1947–1960 Last type with crimped edges	Front	Serious collectors have Type B, C, D, and E merit badges recrimped to restore their original appearance as many badges lose their neat appearance over the years if the merit badge is not cared for properly. If a Type E badge has had significant washings or sun exposure it can be hard to tell from a Type C.
	Nickname: khaki green, khaki Years of Issue: 1947–1960 Last type with crimped edges	Reverse	As with Type C, Type E badges have to size on the back.

=== Type F ===
Front/Reverse (Swimming)	Essential facts	Description	
	Nickname: khaki twill, rolled edge twill Years of Issue: 1961–1968 Not all badges appeared in this type	Background	Type F badges replaced the earlier crimped edge badges with a "rolled" edge, which is stitched around the outside to prevent unraveling.
	Nickname: khaki twill, rolled edge twill Years of Issue: 1961–1968 Not all badges appeared in this type	Front	Type F was introduced concurrently with Type G (see below), and both types were manufactured together for several years. The difference in the motif is that whereas Type F badges had a plain background, Type G badges were completely embroidered inside the green ring. Some badge motifs had been made this way since Type A; they moved directly to Type G and never appeared in Type F.
	Nickname: khaki twill, rolled edge twill Years of Issue: 1961–1968 Not all badges appeared in this type	Reverse	The BSA introduced an extra layer of cloth backing underneath the khaki cloth. Type F used gauze or cheese cloth and subsequent badge types used a fuller solid cloth backing.

=== Type G ===
Front/Reverse (Forage Crops)	Essential facts	Description	
	Nickname: cloth back Years of Issue: 1961–1971	Background	While all Type G badges have full embroidery inside the green ring, there were a few Type A, B, C, D, and E merit badges with full embroidery and hence do not exist as Type F merit badges; examples are: "Foundry Practice", "Grasses, Legumes, and Forage Crops" (later shortened to "Forage Crops"), "Farm Layout and Building Arrangement", and "Farm Home and its Planning".
	Nickname: cloth back Years of Issue: 1961–1971	Front	In 1969, the BSA started issuing silver-bordered badges for those badges that were on the mandatory list for Eagle rank. Silver–bordered badges appear in Type G, H, and J. Consequently, the border color of a badge will change when it goes on and off the mandatory list. A good example is "Camping" Type H, which had a green border from 1973 to 1977, yet silver border before and after that; so this particular green border "Camping" variety is fairly rare.
	Nickname: cloth back Years of Issue: 1961–1971	Reverse	Type G badges were the first to appear with a full cloth backing hence the nickname cloth back.

=== Type H ===
Front/Reverse (Collections)	Essential facts	Description	
	Nickname: plastic back Years of Issue: 1972–2002	Background	Type H merit badges are made with a plastic–coated backing, hence the nickname plastic back. The plastic coating is most commonly clear, but is also found in a milky white color. From 1972 until sometime after 1980, blue plastic–coated merit badges were often issued. Over a hundred different types of blue-plastic back badges are known to exist. On badges made out of blue cloth, it can be difficult to tell if the plastic is clear or blue.
	Nickname: plastic back Years of Issue: 1972–2002	Front	Type G, H, I and J badges are all fully embroidered. As they were made for 30 years, Type H merit badges are by far the most common.
	Nickname: plastic back Years of Issue: 1972–2002	Reverse	Type H and all subsequent badges have both the full cloth back of a Type G and a plastic-coated backing for durability.

=== Type I ===
Front/Reverse (White Water)	Essential facts	Description	
	Nickname: computer designed Years of Issue: 1993–1995	Background	Type I merit badges were designed using computers, hence the nickname computer design. The background stitching is flatter than that of Type G, H, and J badges and has the appearance of having punched holes, but the most obvious difference is in the green border––it is no longer rolled, but flat.
	Nickname: computer designed Years of Issue: 1993–1995	Front	The BSA decided to phase in these badges beginning in 1993 and were discontinued in 1995. Only 30 varieties appear as Type I. So while not that old, they are also not that common. They were made in two sizes: 38 mm and 42 mm. Two different sizes of merit badges can not be lined up neatly on the same sash. These badges came individually packaged in plastic bags with identification labels.
	Nickname: computer designed Years of Issue: 1993–1995	Reverse	There is a lockstitch and a brown ring stitched just inside the green ring on the obverse side of a Type I badge.

=== Type J ===
Front/Reverse (Fish and Wildlife Management)	Essential facts	Description	
	Nickname: Scout Stuff; Years of Issue: 2002–present	Background	The BSA started putting its supply division logo on all patches (ranks, position, numerals, etc.) in 2002 to reduce counterfeiting and show support for the American labor force.
	Nickname: Scout Stuff; Years of Issue: 2002–present	Front	The front of a Type J looks just like the front of a Type H badge.
	Nickname: Scout Stuff; Years of Issue: 2002–present	Reverse	The only difference between a Type J merit badge and a Type H badge is that a Type J has some variation of the BSA Supply Division's Scout Stuff logo stamped on the back; hence the nickname "Scout Stuff". The new logo variation verifies that the insignia was produced by Boy Scouts of America official suppliers and guarantees the supplier meets BSA standards and fair labor practices.

=== Type K ===
Front/Reverse (Scuba Diving)	Essential facts	Description	
	Nickname: 2010, 100-year anniversary Years of Issue: 2010–present	Background	In 2010 BSA held a contest and changed the logo to the winner's brand new design to commemorate the BSA centennial.
	Nickname: 2010, 100-year anniversary Years of Issue: 2010–present	Front	The front did not change from the type J.
	Nickname: 2010, 100-year anniversary Years of Issue: 2010–present	Reverse	The reverse has parts of the centennial logo, which consists of: the BSA fleur-de-lis in gold, "2010" in red, "BSA" in blue, and "100 years of scouting" in blue.

=== Historical ===
Front/Reverse (Tracking)	Essential facts	Description	
	Nickname: Historical; Year of Issue: 2010	Background	As part of the BSA centennial, four discontinued original merit badges were available only for 2010: Carpentry, Pathfinding, Signaling and Tracking.
	Nickname: Historical; Year of Issue: 2010	Front	The fronts use the original 1911 designs on a twill background with a gold mylar border.
	Nickname: Historical; Year of Issue: 2010	Reverse	The reverse has the centennial logo.

== Errors vs variations ==
Manufacturing error on the First Aid to Animals merit badge, Type H, 1972

The visual appearance of a merit badge may alter due to several reasons. A "variation" is a minor change, whether intentional or not. A "manufacturing error" is a mistake or significant deviation from the BSA-approved badge design during production. A "design error" is when a badge is manufactured the way it was designed, but the design had a significant flaw.

=== Specimen variations ===
Variations do not appreciably alter the badge's appearance or design. Two types of variations include positional changes and stitching changes. These are often caused by manufacturing variations and are not classified separately. However, some variations have attained notoriety, such as the waffle weave variation found among Type C badges and the large people vs. slender people variations among Family Life badges. Such variations were very common up until the 1940s and still occur, though not as often. Collectors find these variations interesting and collect such badges. Examples of positional shifts among the objects comprising the motif of a merit badge include changes in the precise positioning of the tent and the mountains among Camping Type H merit badges.

Stitch patterns and thread types such as silk or cotton are not always consistent. There are three known stitching variations among the Type C Personal Health merit badges: "vertical heart", "horizontal heart", and "split heart"; the variation creates the appearance of a split down the middle of the heart. A similar error appears in both Type H and Type J Citizenship in the Nation badges, where colors vary in order from red, white, and blue to blue, white, and red; the reasons for this are unknown. Large and small bell varieties also exist. Most Type C badges come in both cotton and silk thread variations. Emergency Preparedness was made with a red cross from 1972 until 1979, when it was replaced with a green cross in 1980. This change was intentionally made.

=== Manufacturing errors ===
Genuine manufacturing errors occur from time to time. Some Atomic Energy Type G badges were made without a nucleus. The only time a merit badge was made without a silver, green, blue (aviation blues only), or gold (2010 historicals only) border was in 1987 when Whitewater Type H badges were made with a black border. Dairying appears in Type H with the cheese in both orange and burgundy. It is supposed to be orange.

There have been at least three Type H badges made with little or no plastic; called plasticizing or Type G errors: American Cultures, Colonial Philadelphia, and Journalism. The Colonial Philadelphia patch was only available from 1975 until 1976 to Scouts in the Philadelphia region and could only be used for Eagle Palms.

First Aid to Animals (FATA) Type H was made in error with a silver border in 1972. This is one of the most famous errors. It has a slight blue tint in the plastic back (see photos). It is believed that only about 100 of these were made and that only about 50 have survived to this day. Counterfeit versions of this badge error also exist. Beekeeping merit badge Type G is also known in silver border error.

=== Design errors ===
The known design errors are all from the early years. Beekeeping was made from 1914 to 1938 with only four legs instead of six simply because of human design error. Beekeeping also exists in thick and thin bodies in Type C. Insect Life was first made, from 1923 to 1924, with a spider on it. Since a spider is an arachnid, not an insect, the design was changed to an aphid the following year. As this particular merit badge specimen was only issued for one year, it is extremely rare.

== Spoof merit badges ==
Spoof merit badges are created and sold by various third parties as a parody or joke. A multitude of emblems includes snoring, walking, surfing, computer viruses, citizenship in the universe, snow art, text messaging, whining, boat sinking, duct tape, third wheeling, blister building, coffee drinking, dumpster diving, disorienting, farting, balding, paying with cash, communism, bankruptcy, tax sheltering, settling out of court, money laundering, calling someone the wrong name, tripped in public, high-five instead of fist bumping, having food in teeth, thinking stranger was waving at you, social anxiety, finger carving, surviving COVID-19, DIY surgery, grave robbery, cryptozoology, prank calling, mind control, spying, cannibalism, arson, mob rule, time travel, invisibility, bribery, cult leader, immortality, conspiracy theory, social distancing, and adult beverage drinking.

== Bibliography ==
- Handbook for Boys (1st ed.). Doubleday, Page. 1911.
- Pettit, Ted, ed. (1948). Handbook for Boys (5th ed.). Boy Scouts of America.
- "Historical Merit Badge Program". Boy Scouts of America. April 2010. Archived from the original on April 4, 2010.
- Birkby, Robert (1998). Boy Scout Handbook (11th ed.). Boy Scouts of America. ISBN 0-8395-3105-2. #32105.
- Dean, Allan (October 3, 2002). "Scout Seeks Recognition for Duct Tape Merit Badge". Atlantic Highlands Herald. Archived from the original on March 25, 2005.
- Duersch, Fred Jr. (2003). Merit Badge Field Guide (2nd ed.). Logan, Utah: Downs Printing. OCLC 53284733.
- Duersch, Fred Jr. (November 2004). "Khaki Crimped Merit Badges 1947–1960". International Scouting Collectors Association Journal. 4 (4). Niles, MI: International Scouting Collectors Association.
- Duersch, Fred Jr. (March 2005c). "Wide Crimped Merit Badges". International Scouting Collectors Association Journal. 5 (1). Niles, MI: International Scouting Collectors Association.
- Duersch, Fred Jr. (June 2005f). "Fine Twill Crimped Merit Badges". International Scouting Collectors Association Journal. 5 (2). Niles, MI: International Scouting Collectors Association.
- Duersch, Fred Jr. (December 2005m). "Comparisons Between Fake and Genuine First Aid to Animals Merit Badges". International Scouting Collectors Association Journal. 5 (4). Niles, MI: International Scouting Collectors Association.
- Duersch, Fred Jr. (March 2006). "Rolled Twill Edge Merit Badges". International Scouting Collectors Association Journal. 6 (1). Niles, MI: International Scouting Collectors Association.
- Duersch, Fred Jr. (June 2007). "Narrow Crimped Merit Badges". International Scouting Collectors Association Journal. 7 (2). Miles, MI: International Scouting Collectors Association.
- Duersch, Fred Jr. (2008). Merit Badge Field Guide (3rd ed.). Logan, Utah: Downs Printing.
- Eby, David L. "Stephen Porter: first to earn all merit badges" (PDF). Merit Badge Knot.com.
- Hillcourt, William (1965). Boy Scout Handbook (7th ed.). Boy Scouts of America.
- Hillcourt, William (1979). The Official Boy Scout Handbook (9th ed.). Boy Scouts of America. ISBN 0-8395-3227-X.
- Kuhfeld, Warren (2005). "Collecting Merit Badges The ISCA Getting Started Collecting Series" (PDF). International Scouting Collectors Association.
- Netting, Ruth (April 12, 2011). "NASA and BSA Introduce Robotics Merit Badge". NASA Science. NASA.
- Henning, Stephen. "Merit Badges, Past and Present, and Their Evolution". Henning's Scouters' Pages.
- Katz, Leslie (April 10, 2011). "Boy Scouts Can Now Earn Robotics Merit Badge". CNET News. Archived from the original on May 3, 2012.
- Murg, Stepanie (February 29, 2008). "Nailing Graphic Design Badge, Eagle Scout Designs Centennial Logo for Boy Scouts". Media Bistro.
- Peterson, Robert (2002). "Evolution of the Eagle Scout Award". Scouting. Boy Scouts of America. Archived from the original on June 25, 2006.
- Reis, Mitch (November 4, 2007). "Spotting Fake BSA Insignia, Including the Fake First Aid to Animals Merit Badge". MitchReis.com.
- Wendell, Bryan (April 1, 2010) [January 12, 2010]. "Historical Merit Badges Help Boy Scouts Celebrate Scouting's Past". Scouting. Boy Scouts of America – via Aaron on Scouting.
- "History of Required Merit Badges for Eagle Scouts". U.S. Scouting Service Project. August 6, 2007.
- "Merit Badges". U.S. Scouting Service Project. June 9, 2011.
