= Joan Breton Connelly =

Archaeologist and academic

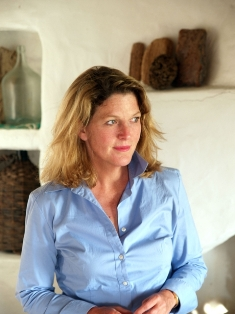
- Connelly in 2007
- Title: Professor of Classics
- Awards: MacArthur Fellowship 1996; Ralph Waldo Emerson Award 2015 The Parthenon Enigma

Academic background
- Education: Bryn Mawr College; Princeton University

Academic work
- Discipline: Classical Archaeology
- Institutions: New York University

Joan Breton Connelly is an American classical archaeologist and Professor of Classics and Art History at New York University. She is Director of the Yeronisos Island Excavations and Field School in Cyprus. Connelly was awarded a MacArthur Fellowship in 1996. She received the Archaeological Institute of America Excellence in Undergraduate Teaching Award in 2007 and held the Lillian Vernon Chair for Teaching Excellence at New York University from 2002 to 2004. She is an Honorary Citizen of the Municipality of Peyia, Republic of Cyprus.

== Works ==
Connelly's scholarship focuses on Greek art, myth, and religion, and includes a groundbreaking reinterpretation of the Parthenon and its sculptures. In The Parthenon Enigma: A New Understanding of the West's Most Iconic Building and the People who Made It, Connelly presents her reading of the Parthenon's sculptural program within its full historic, mythological, and religious contexts. The New York Times Book Review named The Parthenon Enigma a Notable Book of the Year 2014. The Daily Beast named it one of the top ten works of nonfiction for 2014 and Metropolis Magazine named it one of the year's Top Ten Books in Architecture and Design. Phi Beta Kappa society honored The Parthenon Enigma in 2015 with the Ralph Waldo Emerson Award for its significant contribution to the humanities.

A cultural historian, Connelly has examined topics ranging from female agency, to ritual space, landscape, life cycles, identity, reception, and complexity. In her Portrait of a Priestess: Women and Ritual in Ancient Greece, Connelly challenges long held beliefs concerning the "invisibility" of women in ancient Greece and brings together far-flung archaeological evidence for women's leadership roles in the religious life of the city. Portrait of a Priestess was named as one of the 100 Notable Books of the Year for 2007 by the New York Times Book Review, and the Association of American Publishers named it the best book in Classics and Ancient History for 2007. In 2009, Portrait of a Priestess won the Archaeological Institute of America's James R. Wiseman Book Award.

A field archaeologist, Connelly has worked at Corinth, Athens, and Nemea in Greece, at Paphos, Kourion, and Ancient Marion in Cyprus, and on the island of Failaka off the coast of Kuwait. In 1985, she served as consultant for the design and installation of the Hellenistic galleries in the Kuwait National Museum. Since 1990, Connelly has directed the NYU Yeronisos Island Excavations and Field School just off western Cyprus. Here, she has pioneered eco-archaeology, undertaking floral and faunal surveys, annual bird counts, and establishing guidelines sensitive to the ways in which archaeological intervention impacts the natural environment. Her fieldwork has focused on cross-cultural exchange in the Hellenized East during the centuries following the death of Alexander the Great.

== Education and professional life ==
Connelly graduated from St. Ursula Academy in 1972, receiving the school's Achievement Award for Alumnae in 2006.

Connelly received an A.B. in Classics from Princeton University. She received her M.A. and PhD in Classical and Near Eastern Archaeology from Bryn Mawr College, where she later served as an Assistant Dean of the Undergraduate College, Lecturer in Classical Archaeology, and as a member of the board of trustees. Connelly has held visiting fellowships at All Souls College, Magdalen College, New College, and Corpus Christi College, Oxford University, and has been a visiting fellow at the Radcliffe Institute for Advanced Study, Harvard University. She held the Norbert Schimmel Fellowship and Classical Fellowships at the Metropolitan Museum of Art and was a visiting scholar in Anthropology at the Field Museum of Natural History in Chicago. Connelly was Hetty Goldman Member at the School of Historical Studies, Institute for Advanced Study, Princeton, in 2010-11 and Visitor of the Institute in 2015. She was appointed Visiting Professor in the Departement Altertumswissenschaften, University of Basel, Switzerland, in 2012. She returns to All Souls, Oxford, as visiting fellow in 2016. Connelly is a fellow of the Society of Antiquaries of London, the Royal Geographical Society, the Explorers Club, and the Society of Woman Geographers. She is a Trustee of the Association of Members of the Institute of Advanced Study, the Cyprus American Archaeological Research Institute, the Society for the Preservation of the Greek Heritage, and the Pharos Arts Foundation.

Connelly served on the Cultural Property Advisory Committee, Bureau of Educational and Cultural Affairs, U.S. Department of State, from 2003 through 2011. For over twenty years Professor Connelly has team taught a popular course at NYU titled "Ancient Art at Risk: Conservation, Ethics, and Cultural Heritage Policy" with physical chemist, Professor Norbert Baer of the Institute of Fine Arts Conservation Center.

In collaboration with architect Demetri Porphyrios, Connelly submitted a proposal for the World Trade Center Site Memorial Competition in 2003.

Connelly has been interviewed on the Parthenon by Jeffrey Brown for the PBS NewsHour. She has spoken on Greek Priestesses for Andrew Marr's Start the Week program, BBC Radio 4. In 2007, Connelly appeared in Star Wars: The Legacy Revealed (The History Channel) where she discussed classical antecedents for epic themes in the Star Wars saga. In 2008, she appeared in Indiana Jones: The Ultimate Quest (The History Channel, Lucasfilm and Prometheus Entertainment), in which she discussed new technologies in field archaeology, the importance of stratigraphic context, and the global illicit antiquities market. In 2012, her excavations of Yeronisos Island, Cyprus, were featured on ABC's Born to Explore with Richard Wiese. She has also contributed to The Wall Street Journal and the New York Daily News.

In April 2015, renowned physicist Freeman Dyson told The New York Times Sunday Book Review that Joan Breton Connelly was one of the three writers he would invite to a literary dinner party, along with Kristen R. Ghodsee and Mary Doria Russell. When asked what book is currently on his nightstand, Dyson answered Connelly's Parthenon Enigma.

== Bibliography ==
- Votive Sculpture of Hellenistic Cyprus (New York and Nicosia 1988)
- "Votive Offerings of Hellenistic Failaka: Evidence for Herakles Cult," In L'Arabie Préislamique et son Environnement Historique et Culturel, Université des Sciences Humaine de Strasbourg (Leiden 1989) 145-158
- "Narrative and Image in Attic Vase Painting: Ajax and Kassandra at the Trojan Palladion," in Peter Holiday, ed., Narrative and Event in Ancient Art (Cambridge. 1993) 88–129.
- "Parthenon and Parthenoi: A Mythological Interpretation of the Parthenon Frieze," American Journal of Archaeology 100 (1996) 53–80.
- "Excavations on Geronisos (1990-1997): The First Report," Reports of the Department of Antiquities of Cyprus, 2002. (Geronisos Island First Report)
- "Hellenistic and Byzantine Cisterns on Geronisos Island," Reports of the Department of Antiquities of Cyprus, 2002. (Cisterns)
- "Terracotta Oil Lamps from Geronisos and their Contexts," Reports of the Department of Antiquities of Cyprus, 2002. (Terracotta Oil Lamps)
- "The Chalcolithic Occupation of Geronisos Island," Reports of the Department of Antiquities of Cyprus, 2004. (Chalcolithic Occupation)
- "Excavations on Geronisos Island: Second Report, the Central South Complex," Reports of the Department of Antiquities of Cyprus, 2005. (Central South Complex)
- "Stamp-Seals from Geronisos and their Contexts," Reports of the Department of Antiquities of Cyprus, 2006. (Stamp Seals)
- "The Legacy of Classical Athens in Post 9/11 New York," in The Future of New York: An International Perspective, ed. E. Posner, Properties: The Review of the Steven L. Newman Real Estate Institute (Spring 2006) 204–213.
- Portrait of a priestess: women and ritual in ancient Greece. Princeton, N.J.: Princeton University Press. 2007.
- "Hybridity and Identity on Late Ptolemaic Yeronisos," in Actes du Colloque "Chypre à l'époque hellénistique et impériale: Recherches récentes et nouvelles découvertes," Université Paris Ouest-Nanterre et Institut National d'Histoire de l'Art, Nanterre - Paris 25-26 septembre 2009, eds. A.-M. Guimier-Sorbets and D. Michaelidès, Centre d'Etudes Chypriotes Cahier 39 (2009) 69–88. (Hybridity and Identity on Late Ptolemaic Yeronisos)
- "Twilight of the Ptolemies: Egyptian Presence on late Hellenistic Yeronisos," in Egypt and Cyprus in Antiquity, Proceedings of the International Conference, Nicosia, April 3–6, 2003, D. Michaelides, V. Kassianidou, R.S. Merrilies, eds., Cyprus American Archaeological Research Institute and the University of Cyprus, Archaeological Research Unit (Oxford 2009) 194–209. (Twilight of the Ptolemies)
- "Yeronisos: Twenty Years on Cleopatra's Isle," Explorers Club Journal, December 2010, 18–25.
- The Parthenon enigma: a new understanding of the West's most iconic building and the people who made it. New York: Knopf. 2014.

=== Critical studies and reviews of Connelly's work ===
The Parthenon enigma

- Caroline Alexander, "If It Pleases the Gods," The New York Times Book Review (23 January 2014).
- J.J. Pollitt, "Decoding the Parthenon," The New Criterion (1 March 2014).
- Brunilde S. Ridgway, "Rethinking the West's Most Iconic Building," Bryn Mawr Alumnae Bulletin (August, 2014).
- Nigel Spivey, Greece & Rome (October, 2014).
- William St. Clair, Times Literary Supplement, May 30, 2014.
- A.E. Stallings, "Deep Frieze Meaning," The Weekly Standard (8 September 2014).
- Daisy Dunn, Literary Review, August 8, 2014.
- Larry Getlen, New York Post (January 26, 2014).
- Eric Wills, The Washington Post (January 25, 2014).
- Evaggelos Vallianatos, The Huffington Post (February 25, 2014).
- Nick Romeo, The Daily Beast (February 12, 2014).
- Rebecca Newberger Goldstein, "Times Higher Education's Books of 2014"
- Daniel Mendelsohn, 'Deep Frieze' The New Yorker'
- Mary Beard, 'The Latest Scheme for the Parthenon, The New York Review of Books
- James Romm, 'The Parthenon Enigma,' The Wall Street Journal.

Portrait of a priestess

- Green, Peter (June 28, 2007). "The women and the gods". The New York Review of Books. 54 (11): 32–35.
- Steve Coates, "Keepers of the Faith," The New York Times Book Review (1 July 2007).
