= Terry L. Grove =

- Born: May 13, 1942; Altoona, Pennsylvania
- Died: December 5, 2020 (aged 78); Orlando, Florida
- Occupation: Minister
- Known for: Scouting

Terry L. Grove was the past chairman of the International Scouting Collectors Association (ISCA). Grove was also a retired United Church of Christ minister and Scouter. He served on the executive board of the Central Florida Council of the Boy Scouts of America.

Grove graduated from Juniata College and Bethany Theological Seminary with a Masters of Divinity degree, then a Doctor of Ministry degree. He served as the minister of Altamonte Chapel in Altamonte Springs, Florida and was a former member of the board of Habitat for Humanity for Seminole County and Greater Apopka.

== Background ==
He was ordained in 1967, serving Church of the Brethren pastorates in Florida, Washington and Indiana. From 1973 to 1997 he was a regional director for the Church Rural Overseas Program of the Church World Service.

Grove's life-long avocation has been Scouting. He first joined Cub Scouting in 1951, eventually moving to Boy Scouts and earning the rank of Eagle Scout in 1956. As an adult, Grove has been awarded the God and Service religious award, the District Award of Merit, the Silver Beaver and the Distinguished Eagle Scout Award. Grove was a Vigil Honor member of the Order of the Arrow and received the Founder's Award.

Grove became interested in the history of the Eagle Scout Award when his son was awarded Eagle Scout in 1983. He became a member of the International Scouting Collectors Association (ISCA) and began writing articles for the association. In 2001, he received the first ISCA Scouting Memorabilia Distinguished Service Award. He has the largest known collection of Eagle Scout memorabilia and has written numerous articles and a book about the Eagle Scout Award. Grove's collection has been on display at the National Scouting Museum, the 2005 National Scout Jamboree the 2010 National Scout Jamboree and at every National Order of the Arrow Conference since 1995.

== Published works ==
- Grove, Terry L. (2007). The Kekeenowin of the Wimachtendienk. Reliance Media, Incorporated. ISBN 978-0977653461.
- Grove, Terry L. (2018). 100 Years of the Eagle Scout Award. CreateSpace Independent Publishing Platform. ISBN 978-1979431941.
- Grove, Terry L. (2019). Eagle Scout Award: A Pictorial History. Independently Published. ISBN 978-1087291420.
