= Merit badge =

Award of Scouting America

Merit badges
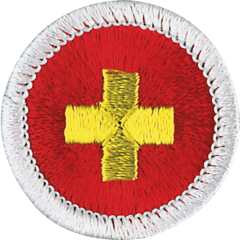
- First Aid merit badge
- Owner: Scouting America
- Created: 1910

Merit badges are awards earned by members of Scouting America, based on activities within the area of study by completing a list of periodically updated requirements. The purpose of the merit badge program is to allow Scouts to examine subjects to determine if they would like to further pursue them as a career or vocation. The program also introduces Scouts to life skills such as contacting an adult they had not met before, arranging a meeting, and demonstrating their skills, similar to a job or college interview.

The merit badge award is represented by a circular patch with an image representing the badge's topic. The patches for the Eagle Scout-required merit badges are distinguishable by the silver border on the outside edge. Merit badges are displayed on a sash which can be worn with the Scouts BSA uniform on formal occasions. The National Council reviews and updates badges each year. There are currently 143 merit badges available to be earned.

Scouting organizations in other countries issue or have issued merit badges, including Canada, Indonesia, Japan, Spain, Thailand, and the United Kingdom. Austria has a program similar to merit badges for certain age groups.

A sample merit badge sash: From left to right, starting at top; 1 Swimming, Mammal Study, Environmental Science; 2 Basketry, Wood Carving, Dog Care; 3 Wilderness Survival, Emergency Preparedness, Bird Study; 4 Public Speaking, Scholarship, Law; 5 Rifle Shooting, Archery, Metalwork; 6 Fish and Wildlife Management, Citizenship in the Nation, Orienteering; 7 Citizenship in the Community, Communications, Personal Management; 8 Soil and Water Conservation, Reptile and Amphibian Study, Lifesaving; 9 Forestry, Citizenship in the World, Safety

== Current badges ==
The last revision date indicates the date of the latest requirement changes; the copyright or printing dates of merit badge pamphlets may have a different date. The Eagle Scout required merit badges are shaded in gray.

Name	Created	Requirements revision	Pamphlet revision	Number earned (2020)	Number earned since creation (through 2020)	Related subjects
American Business	1967	2023	2013	4,967	61,953	Business, Economy of the United States
American Cultures	1978	2006	2013	2,906	83,032	Ethnic groups in the United States
American Heritage	1975	2020	2019, 2020	6,700	192,552	History of the United States, Historic preservation
American Indian Culture	1931	2008	2008	7,240	1,292,119	Native American culture
American Labor	1987	2006	2015	1,892	29,926	Trade unions
Animal Science	1975	2023	2020	2,778	83,893	Animal husbandry
Animation	2015	2022	2015	4,445	29,817	Animation
Archaeology	1997	2021	2008	2,671	192,293	Archaeology
Archery	1911	2023	2008	10,487	1,797,351	Archery
Architecture	1911	2023	2008	2,734	237,322	Architecture
Art	1911	2013	2013	13,953	1,436,561	Art
Artificial Intelligence	2025	2025				AI
Astronomy	1911	2022	2013	7,474	727,496	Astronomy
Athletics	1911	2022	2008	1,557	1,081,697	Track and field athletics
Automotive Maintenance	2008	2008	2012	7,108	225,956	Auto mechanics
Aviation	1952	2006	2008	8,064	684,527	Aviation
Backpacking	1982	2007	2008	1,640	233,724	Backpacking
Basketry	1927	2003	2008	7,388	2,523,871	Basket weaving
Bird Study	1914	2005	2008	3,950	612,616	Ornithology
Bugling	1911	2020	2008	476	172,979	Bugle
Camping	1911	2005	2008	30,490	4,954,170	Camping
Canoeing	1927	2022	2008	9,853	3,166,116	Canoeing
Chemistry	1911	2020	2008	7,166	412,187	Chemistry
Chess	2011	2011	2011	15,454	239,164	Chess
Citizenship in the Community	1952	2005	2013	41,987	3,753,138	Citizenship, Local government
Citizenship in the Nation	1951	2022	2008	43,247	3,517,139	Citizenship, Government of the United States
Citizenship in the World	1972	2005	2008	42,738	2,593,491	Global citizenship
Climbing	1997	2022	2008	7,228	521,055	Climbing
Coin Collecting	1938	2022	2008	4,639	524,111	Coin collecting
Collections	1991	2021	2008	6,429	168,524	Collecting
Communication	1968	2003	2008	36,675	2,352,069	Communication
Competitive Gaming	2026	2026				Esports
Composite Materials	2006	2023	2008	1,011	22,472	Composite materials
Cooking	1911	2023	2014	36,473	4,648,594	Cooking
Crime Prevention	1996	2020	2008	5,628	174,749	Crime prevention
Cycling	1911	2023	2008	5,247	610,301	Cycling
Cybersecurity	2025	2025	2025	0	0	Cyber Security
Dentistry	1975	2022	2008	1,924	152,381	Dentistry
Digital Technology	2014	2023	2014	8,812	54,274	Technology
Disabilities Awareness	1993	2023	2008	6,334	156,539	Disability
Dog Care	1938	2003	2008	4,136	449,515	Dogs
Drafting	1965	2008	2008	1,026	231,905	Technical drawing
Electricity	1911	2021	2008	6,235	859,444	Electricity
Electronics	1963	2021	2008	4,063	259,193	Electronics
Emergency Preparedness	1972	2023	2016	24,733	2,082,381	Emergency management
Energy	1976	2005	2008	2,162	96,783	Energy consumption
Engineering	1967	2008	2008	7,800	213,737	Engineering
Entrepreneurship	1997	2006	2008	3,284	42,254	Entrepreneurship
Environmental Science	1972	2023	2008	23,571	3,016,109	Environmental science
Exploration	2017	2020	2017	1,464	10,012	Exploring
Family Life	1991	2023	2013	48,408	1,455,287	Family values
Farm Mechanics	1928	2023	2008	1,424	233,871	Agricultural machinery
Fingerprinting	1938	2003	2008	18,898	1,891,477	Fingerprinting
Fire Safety	1995	2004	2008	7,918	2,675,073	Fire safety
First Aid	1911	2022	2008	31,636	7,370,988	First aid
Fish and Wildlife Management	1972	2021	2008	4,874	718,006	Wildlife management
Fishing	1952	2021	2008	13,601	2,126,476	Fishing
Fly Fishing	2002	2021	2008	2,439	52,650	Fly fishing
Forestry	1911	2005	2008	4,269	1,213,719	Forestry
Game Design	2013	2023	2013	7,740	92,506	Game Design
Gardening	1911	2002	2008	2,782	397,570	Gardening
Genealogy	1972	2023	2008	6,020	261,683	Genealogy, Family history
Geocaching	2010	2010	2010	5,811	149,929	Geocaching
Geology	1953	2023	2008	7,484	747,259	Geology
Golf	1976	2023	2008	2,369	185,837	Golf
Graphic Arts	1987	2006	2008	2,228	69,365	Graphic design
Healthcare Professions	2021	2021	2021			Health care, medicine
Hiking	1921	2023	2008	5,977	1,370,957	Hiking
Home Repairs	1943	2022	2008	3,442	2,435,429	Home repairs
Horsemanship	1911	2011	2008	4,798	693,845	Equestrianism
Insect Study	1985	2008	2008	1,734	180,460	Entomology
Inventing	2010	2023	2010	1,833	29,178	Invention
Journalism	1927	2006	2008	1,516	113,468	Journalism
Kayaking	2012	2020	2016	11,083	261,710	Kayaking
Landscape Architecture	1967	2008	2008	1,400	90,412	Landscape architecture
Law	1974	2003	2008	5,962	218,325	Law
Leatherwork	1951	2002	2008	10,855	2,637,286	Leather crafting
Lifesaving	1911	2021	2008	5,842	3,150,759	Lifeguarding
Mammal Study	1985	2023	2008	7,845	1,302,419	Zoology
Metalwork	1927	2007	2008	4,273	1,202,235	Metalworking
Mining in Society	2014	2022	2014	3,789	29,397	Mining
Military Service and Veterans	2026	2026				United States Armed Forces, Veterans
Model Design and Building	1963	2020	2008	1,359	235,108	Scale models
Motorboating	1961	2021	2008	2,638	635,883	Motorboat
Moviemaking	2013	2013	2013	5,779	61,305	Filmmaking
Multisport	2025	2025				Triathlon
Music	1911	2003	2008	10,069	1,388,218	Music
Nature	1952	2023	2008	6,056	1,737,920	Nature
Nuclear Science	2005	2011	2008	3,493	210,965	Nuclear physics
Oceanography	1964	2003	2008	4,442	336,423	Oceanography
Orienteering	1973	2003	2008	5,337	888,402	Orienteering
Painting	1911	2020	2008	3,163	584,778	Paint
Personal Fitness	1952	2023	2008	40,355	2,793,990	Physical fitness
Personal Management	1972	2003	2008	40,897	2,100,383	Personal finances, time management
Pets	1958	2003	2008	8,333	690,228	Pets
Photography	1911	2021	2015	11,618	590,968	Photography
Pioneering	1911	2022	2008	6,129	2,492,888	Pioneering
Plant Science	1974	2023	2008	1,653	58,456	Botany
Plumbing	1911	2004	2008	2,761	417,612	Plumbing
Pottery	1927	2008	2008	2,842	427,803	Pottery
Programming	2013	2023	2013	4,473	29,163	Computer programming
Public Health	1911	2021	2008	11,510	1,539,459	Public health
Public Speaking	1932	2002	2008	5,570	684,343	Public speaking
Pulp and Paper	1972	2006	2008	4,054	150,884	Pulp, Papermaking
Radio	1923	2008	2008	3,550	205,747	Radio
Railroading	1952	2022	2008	4,105	275,919	Rail transport
Reading	1929	2022	2008	5,635	1,508,324	Reading
Reptile and Amphibian Study	1993	2023	2008	3,526	682,587	Herpetology
Rifle Shooting	1988	2001	2008	11,081	1,533,240	Rifle, Shooting
Robotics	2011	2011	2011	5,452	123,337	Robotics
Rowing	1933	2021	2008	2,118	1,763,164	Rowing
Safety	1927	2020	2008	6,305	2,959,333	Safety
Salesmanship	1927	2023	2008	5,121	362,051	Sales
Scholarship	1911	2004	2008	7,287	1,307,274	Scholarship
Scouting Heritage	2010	2010	2010	6,517	62,290	History of Scouting America
Scuba Diving	2009	2009	2009	1,323	24,100	Scuba Diving
Sculpture	1911	2007	2008	3,188	350,848	Sculpture
Search and Rescue	2012	2012	2012	4,082	79,782	Search and rescue
Shotgun Shooting	1988	2005	2008	5,631	627,238	Shotgun, shooting
Signs, Signals, and Codes	2015	2015	2015	4,580	38,454	Signs, signals, codes
Skating	1973	2005	2008	1,700	184,647	Ice skating, Roller skating
Small-Boat Sailing	1964	2023	2008	3,142	725,921	Sailing
Snow Sports	1999	2023	2008	5,860	493,109	Skiing, Snowboarding
Soil and Water Conservation	1952	2004	2008	5,067	1,174,015	Soil conservation, Water conservation
Space Exploration	1965	2020	2008	8,750	667,365	Space exploration
Sports	1972	2023	2008	3,557	1,184,127	Sports
Stamp Collecting	1932	2007	2008	1,278	395,283	Stamp collecting
Surveying	1911	2004	2008	603	157,073	Surveying
Sustainability	2013	2020	2013	8,477	49,748	Sustainability
Swimming	1911	2023	2008	21,220	6,659,181	Swimming
Textile	1973	2003	2008	1,929	157,902	Textiles
Theater	1967	2021	2008	1,592	97,833	Theatre
Traffic Safety	1975	2022	2008	5,758	194,271	Road traffic safety
Truck Transportation	1973	2005	2008	1,991	151,364	Truck driver
Veterinary Medicine	1995	2005	2008	2,552	92,251	Veterinary medicine
Water Sports	1969	2007	2008	1,064	266,295	Waterskiing
Weather	1927	2006	2008	9,215	651,891	Weather
Welding	2012	2012	2012	4,709	86,233	Welding
Whitewater	1987	2020	2008	1,508	105,245	Whitewater rafting
Wilderness Survival	1974	2007	2008	11,604	1,805,803	Wilderness, Survival skills
Wildland Fire Management	2026	2026				Wildfire suppression
Wood Carving	1923	2006	2008	9,430	2,462,368	Wood carving
Woodwork	1923	2021	2008	3,066	999,863	Woodworking

== Historical program ==
Offered only in 2010, the Historical Merit Badge program, part of the Boy Scouts of America centennial, allowed Scouts to earn the discontinued Carpentry, Pathfinding, Signalling, and Tracking (originally called Stalking) merit badges. The patches for these historical merit badges are distinguished by a gold ring on the outside edge. All were based on merit badges that were among the original 57 issued in 1911.

== See also ==
- Discontinued merit badges (Boy Scouts of America)
- History of merit badges (Boy Scouts of America)
- Original 57 merit badges (Boy Scouts of America)
