= Discontinued merit badges (Boy Scouts of America) =

This is a list of merit badges formerly offered by Scouting America, formerly known as Boy Scouts of America. In some cases, the entire subject has been dropped from the merit badge roster. In others, the merit badge's name has been changed, with or without significant revision to the badge's requirements.

In 2010, in celebration of Scouting's 100th anniversary, four historical merit badges were reintroduced for one year only—Carpentry, Pathfinding, Signaling, and Tracking (formerly Stalking). Bugling merit badge was briefly discontinued in 2010 but reinstated after complaints from volunteers.

Merit badge	Created	Discontinued	Notes	Related subjects	References
Aerodynamics	1942	1952	Created with Aeronautics, Airplane Design, and Airplane Structure to replace Aviation; replaced, along with Aeronautics, Airplane Design, and Airplane Structure, by new Aviation	Aerodynamics	
Aeronautics	1942	1952	Created with Aerodynamics, Airplane Design, and Airplane Structure to replace Aviation; replaced, along with Aerodynamics, Airplane Design, and Airplane Structure, by new Aviation	Aeronautics	
Agribusiness	1987	1995	Replaced Farm and Ranch Management	Agribusiness	
Agriculture	1911	1975		Agriculture	
Airplane Design	1942	1952	Created with Aerodynamics, Aeronautics, and Airplane Structure to replace Aviation; replaced, along with Aerodynamics, Aeronautics, and Airplane Structure, by new Aviation	Fixed-wing aircraft	
Airplane Structure	1942	1952	Created with Aerodynamics, Aeronautics, and Airplane Design to replace Aviation; replaced, along with Aerodynamics, Aeronautics, and Airplane Design, by new Aviation	Fixed-wing aircraft	
Ambulance	1910	1911	Replaced by First Aid	First aid	
Angling	1911	1951	Replaced by Fishing	Angling, Fishing	
Animal Industry	1928	1975	Replaced by Animal Science	Animal science	
Atomic Energy	1963	2004	Replaced by Nuclear Science	Nuclear energy	
Auto Mechanics	1992	2008	Replaced by Automotive Maintenance	Auto mechanic	
Automobiling	1911	1963		Automobile safety	
Automotive Safety	1962	1974	Replaced by Traffic Safety	Automobile safety	
Aviation	1911	1942	Replaced by Aerodynamics, Aeronautics, Airplane Design, and Airplane Structure	Transportation	
Bee Keeping	1915	1955	Replaced Beefarming; replaced by Beekeeping	Beekeeping	
Beef Production	1928	1975		Beef cattle	
Beefarming	1911	1914	Replaced by Bee Keeping	Beekeeping	
Beekeeping	1956	1995	Replaced Bee Keeping	Beekeeping	
Blacksmithing	1911	1952		Blacksmith, Forging	
Bookbinding	1927	1987	Created with Basketry, Cement Work, Leathercraft, Metalwork, Pottery, Wood Carving, and Woodwork to replace Craftsmanship; replaced, along with Printing/Communications, by Graphic Arts	Bookbinding	
Botany	1921	1995		Botany	
Business	1911	1966	Replaced Clerk; replaced by American Business	Business	
Carpentry	1911	1952	Reintroduced for 2010 only	Carpentry	
Cement Work	1927	1952	Created with Basketry, Bookbinding, Leathercraft, Metalwork, Pottery, Wood Carving, and Woodwork to replace Craftsmanship	Cement	
Cinematography	1990	2013	Replaced by Moviemaking	Cinematography	
Citizenship	1947	1951	Replaced Civics; replaced by Citizenship in the Community, Citizenship in the Home, and Citizenship in the Nation	Citizenship	
Citizenship in Society	2021	2026	Content covered in other merit badges (Disabilities Awareness, Citizenship in the Community, American Cultures)	Diversity, Inclusion	
Citizenship in the Home	1952	1972	Created with Citizenship in the Community and Citizenship in the Nation to replace Citizenship	Family	
Citrus Fruit Culture	1931	1952		Citrus	
Civics	1911	1946	Replaced by Citizenship	Citizenship	
Clerk	1910	1911	Replaced by Business	Business	
Colonial Philadelphia	1975	1976	Was a regional Scouting America badge issued exclusively by the Philadelphia Council during 1975 and 1976 for the U.S. Bicentennial.	Colonial Philadelphia	
Communications	1965	2009	Replaced by Communication	Communication	
Computers	1967	2014	Replaced by Digital Technology	Computer	
Conservation	1911	1952		Conservation movement, Habitat conservation	
Conservation of Natural Resources	1966	1972	Replaced by Environmental Science	Conservation movement, Habitat conservation	
Consumer Buying	1975	1995		Consumerism	
Corn Farming	1928	1975		Maize	
Cotton Farming	1931	1975		Cotton	
Craftsmanship	1911	1926	Replaced by Basketry, Bookbinding, Cement Work, Leathercraft, Metalwork, Pottery, Wood Carving, and Woodwork	Artisan	
Cyclist	1910	1911	Replaced by Cycling	Cycling	
Dairying	1911	1975	Combined into Animal Science in 1975.	Dairy farming	
Dramatics	1932	1966	Replaced by Theatre	Acting	
Electrician	1910	1911	Replaced by Electricity	Electrician	
Farm and Ranch Management	1980	1987	Replaced Farm Records; replaced by Agribusiness	Agribusiness	
Farm Arrangement	1960	1973	Replaced Farm Home and Its Planning and Farm Layout and Building Arrangements; replaced by Farm Arrangements	Agriculture, Agricultural science	
Farm Arrangements	1974	1979	Replaced Farm Arrangement	Agriculture, Agricultural science	
Farm Home and Its Planning	1928	1959	Replaced, along with Farm Layout and Building Arrangements, by Farm Arrangement	Agriculture, Agricultural science	
Farm Layout and Building Arrangements	1928	1959	Replaced, along with Farm Home and Its Planning, by Farm Arrangement	Agriculture, Agricultural science	
Farm Records	1959	1980	Replaced Farm Records and Bookkeeping; replaced by Farm and Ranch Management	Agriculture, Agricultural science	
Farm Records and Bookkeeping	1928	1958	Replaced by Farm Records	Agriculture, Agricultural science	
Firemanship	1911	1995	Replaced by Fire Safety	Firefighter, Fire safety	
First Aid to Animals	1911	1972	Replaced by Veterinary Science	Veterinary medicine	
Food Systems	1978	1987		Food systems, Botany	
Forage Crops	1959	1975	Replaced Grasses, Legumes, and Forage Crops	Forage	
Foundry Practice	1923	1952		Foundry	
Fruit and Nut Growing	1953	1975		Fruit, Nut	
Fruit Culture	1928	1954		Fruit	
Gardener	1910	1911	Replaced by Gardening	Gardening	
General Science	1972	1995		Science	
Grasses, Legumes, and Forage Crops	1938	1958	Replaced by Forage Crops	Grass, Legume, Forage	
Handicap Awareness	1985	1993	Replaced Handicapped Awareness; replaced by Disabilities Awareness	Disability, Disability studies	
Handicapped Awareness	1980	1985	Replaced by Handicap Awareness	Disability, Disability studies	
Handicraft	1911	1942	Replaced by Home Repairs	Home repair	
Hog and Pork Production	1928	1958	Replaced by Hog Production	Pork	
Hog Production	1959	1975	Replaced Hog and Pork Production	Pork	
Horseman	1910	1911	Replaced by Horsemanship	Equestrianism	
Indian Lore	1931	2025	Replaced by American Indian Culture	Native American Culture	
Insect Life	1923	1987	Replaced by Insect Study	Entomology	
Interpreting	1911	1952		Interpreting	
Invention	1911	1917	Only 10 Scouts achieved the merit badge, which required that they obtained a federal patent. There is one known surviving specimen.	Invention	
Landscape Gardening	1930	1958	Replaced by Landscaping	Landscaping	
Landscaping	1959	1966	Replaced Landscape Gardening; replaced by Landscape Architecture	Landscaping	
Leather Work	1928	1951	Replaced by Leatherwork	Leather crafting	
Leathercraft	1927	1952	Replaced Leatherworking, and created with Basketry, Bookbinding, Cement Work, Metalwork, Pottery, Wood Carving, and Woodwork to replace Craftsmanship	Leather crafting	
Leatherworking	1911	1927	Replaced by Leathercraft	Leather crafting	
Life Saving	1911	1959	Replaced by Lifesaving	Lifesaving	
Machinery	1911	1995		Machine	
Mammals	1972	1987	Replaced by Mammal Study	Mammal	
Marksman	1910	1911	Replaced by Marksmanship	Shooting	
Marksmanship	1911	1966	Replaced Marksman; replaced by Rifle and Shotgun Shooting	Shooting	
Masonry	1911	1995		Masonry	
Master-At-Arms	1910	1911		Martial arts	
Mechanical Drawing	1933	1964	Replaced by Drafting	Technical drawing	
Medicine	1991	2021	Replaced by Healthcare Professions	Medicine	
Metallurgy	1965	1971	Replaced by Metals Engineering	Metallurgy	
Metals Engineering	1972	1995	Replaced Metallurgy	Metallurgy	
Mining	1911	1937	Replaced by Rocks and Minerals	Mining	
Musician	1910	1911	Replaced by Music	Music	
Nut Culture	1928	1954		Nut	
Ornithology	1911	1913	Replaced by Bird Study	Ornithology	
Pathfinding	1911	1952	Reintroduced for 2010 only	Blazing, Orienteering	
Personal Finances	1962	1971	Replaced by Personal Management	Personal finance	
Personal Health	1911	1952	Replaced, along with Physical Development, by Personal Fitness	Physical fitness	
Physical Development	1914	1952	Replaced, along with Personal Health, by Personal Fitness	Physical fitness	
Pigeon Raising	1933	1980		Pigeon keeping	
Pioneer	1910	1911	Replaced by Pioneering	Pioneering	
Poultry Farming	1911	1913	Replaced by Poultry Keeping	Poultry	
Poultry Keeping	1914	1974	Replaced Poultry Farming	Poultry	
Printing	1911	1981	Replaced by Printing/Communications	Printing	
Printing/Communications	1982	1987	Replaced Printing; replaced, along with Bookbinding, by Graphic Arts	Printing	
Rabbit Raising	1943	1993		Rabbit	
Reptile Study	1927	1993	Replaced Reptiles; replaced by Reptile and Amphibian Study	Herpetology	
Reptiles	1926	1926	Replaced by Reptile Study	Herpetology	
Rifle and Shotgun Shooting	1967	1987	Replaced Marksmanship; replaced by Rifle Shooting and Shotgun Shooting	Shooting	
Rocks and Minerals	1937	1953	Replaced Mining; replaced by Geology	Geology	
Safety First	1916	1926	Replaced by Safety	Safety	
Seaman	1910	1911	Replaced by Seamanship	Seamanship	
Seamanship	1911	1964	Replaced Seaman; replaced by Small-Boat Sailing	Seamanship	
Sheep Farming	1928	1975		Domestic sheep	
Signaling	1911	1991	Replaced Signaller; reintroduced for 2010 only	Flag semaphore, Morse code	
Signaller	1910	1911	Replaced by Signaling	Flag semaphore	
Skiing	1938	1999	Replaced by Snow Sports	Skiing	
Small Grains	1959	1975	Replaced Small Grains and Cereal Foods	Cereal	
Small Grains and Cereal Foods	1943	1958	Replaced by Small Grains	Cereal	
Soil Management	1928	1952	Replaced by Soil and Water Conservation	Erosion, Soil science	
Stalker	1910	1911	Replaced by Stalking	Tracking	
Stalking	1911	1952	Replaced Stalker; reintroduced as Tracking for 2010 only	Tracking	
Taxidermy	1911	1952		Taxidermy	
Textiles	1927	1972	Replaced by Textile	Textile	
Veterinary Science	1973	1995	Replaced First Aid to Animals; replaced by Veterinary Medicine	Veterinary Medicine	
Waterskiing	1969	2007	Replaced by Water Sports	Waterskiing	
Wildlife Management	1952	1972	Replaced by Fish and Wildlife Management	Wildlife management	
Wireless	1919	1923	Replaced by Radio	Radio	
Wood Turning	1930	1952		Woodturning	
World Brotherhood	1952	1972	Replaced by Citizenship in the World; original badge design was a globe, then in 1968 it was changed to be the Scout sign on a blue background.	Citizenship	
Zoology	1930	1972		Zoology	

== See also ==
- History of merit badges (Boy Scouts of America)
- Merit badge (Boy Scouts of America)
