= Kenneth Kamler =

Kenneth Kamler is an American orthopedic microsurgeon trained at Columbia-Presbyterian Medical Center, who practices surgery of the hand in New York and extreme medicine in some of the most remote regions on Earth.

== Career ==
Kamler has treated bear bites in the Arctic and frostbite in the Antarctic. He has set fractures in the Andes and cared for out-of-breath scuba divers in the Galapagos. He has performed surgery in the mud of the Amazon rainforest and in a NASA undersea analogue space capsule. Additionally, he has flown in zero gravity aboard NASA’s DC-9 "Vomit Comet", testing robots for eventual use in emergency surgery on the International Space Station or on Mars.

He has been on six treks to Mount Everest as expedition doctor and climber; four were with the National Geographic Society deploying laser telescopes and global positioning satellite receivers to measure the exact height of Everest as well as the tectonic motion of the Asian continental plate. On two other expeditions to Everest, he served as Chief High Altitude Physician for NASA-sponsored research on human physiological responses to extreme altitude, and monitored remote body sensors worn by climbers to provide real-time medical data as they ascended the mountain. Dr. Kamler himself has climbed to within 900 vertical feet of the summit of Everest and claims to have been the only doctor high on the mountain, during the infamous 1996 storm that claimed 12 lives. His treatment of the survivors was portrayed in the best-selling book, Into Thin Air and in the IMAX film, Everest (1998).

Kamler has made four trips to Bhutan. Working with the Minister of Health, he has trekked through the remote eastern region to assess health care needs, and in 2008, he witnessed the coronation of the new King, Jigme Khesar Namgyel Wangchuck. Additionally, he has acted as expedition doctor during a high altitude research expedition climbing Mount Kilimanjaro with USARIEM, a research division of the United States Army.

Kamler was vice president of research and education for The Explorers Club for 10 years, former chairman of its science advisory board, and a director for 12 years; he was recently re-elected as a director. He received the coveted Explorers Club Lowell Thomas Award in 2009, for outstanding achievement in exploration. He has been an Explorer-in-Residence at the American Museum of Natural History, a consultant for NASA and for National Geographic Adventure, and a commentator for Outdoor Life Network and CNN. He is currently on the editorial board of advisors of Popular Mechanics.

== Recognitions ==
U.S. News & World Report has recognized him as a 2011 Top Doctor. In 2008 and 2010, Newsday named him one of the Best Doctors on Long Island, and in 2002, New York Magazine named him one of the Best Doctors in New York. He is listed in the New York Guide to Top Doctors as well as in Who's Who in America, and Who's Who in Science and Engineering. He is the subject of a chapter in the book Biography Today: Medical Leaders, and has been profiled in The New York Times, USA Today, U.S. News & World Report, and Reader's Digest. He is a recipient of the Science Museum of Long Island's Lifetime Achievement Award. He is a member of the Sigma Xi National Scientific Research Society. Kamler was honored at the 2005 National Scout Jamboree as one of Twenty Greatest Living Explorers and had a sub-camp named after him.

== Publications ==
Kamler is the author of two books on the physiological and psychological effects of extreme environments, both based largely on his personal experiences: Doctor on Everest (2000), published by Lyons Press, and Surviving the Extremes: What Happens to the Body and Mind at the Limits of Human Endurance, published by St. Martin’s Press and Penguin Books (2004 and 2006). He has written a monthly column for National Geographic Adventure and is a feature writer and contributing editor for Popular Mechanics. He has written chapters for adventure books: Everest—Mountain Without Mercy (1997), The Worst Journey in the World (2006), They Lived to Tell the Tale (2007), Adventurous Dreams (2007), and Grasping for Heaven (2010); and for academic texts: Risk and Exploration in Space (2008), Expedition and Wilderness Medicine (2009), and The Annals of the New York Academy of Science (2009).
