= Richard Wiese =

American explorer and television host

- Born: Richard Wiese; July 13, 1959 (age 67); Long Island, New York, U.S.
- Education: Brown University
- Occupations: Explorer, television host and producer, author
- Known for: President of The Explorers Club; host of Born to Explore with Richard Wiese
- Father: Richard Wiese Sr.
- Honours: Former president, The Explorers Club
- Website: www.borntoexplore.net

Richard Wiese (born July 13, 1959) is an American explorer and television host. He has led The Explorers Club across three separate tenures as its 39th, 44th and 46th president, and was the youngest president in the club's history when first elected in 2002. His fieldwork has taken him to Mount Everest, the North Pole and Antarctica. He is the executive producer and presenter of Born to Explore with Richard Wiese, a travel series that aired on ABC and PBS and received more than a dozen Daytime Emmy Award nominations and two wins, and he co-hosts the public television series Weekends with Yankee.

== Early life and education ==
Wiese was born on Long Island, New York. His father, the Pan Am pilot Richard Wiese Sr., flew solo across the Pacific Ocean from San Francisco to Sydney in 1959, the first solo flight from the United States to Australia. In 1971, at the age of 11, Wiese climbed Mount Kilimanjaro in Tanzania with his father.

He attended St. Anthony's High School in South Huntington, New York, and then Brown University, where he was a brother in the Phi Psi fraternity and studied geology and biology, graduating with the class of 1981. He went on to study applied physiology at Columbia University and completed the USDA Graduate Program in meteorology.

== Expeditions ==
Wiese's fieldwork began early: as a teenager in 1977, he helped create the first artificial reef in Long Island Sound. He has since placed satellite collars on jaguars in the jungle of Mexico's Yucatán, climbed and sampled the Tanzanian volcano Ol Doinyo Lengai, and taken part in two expeditions to Antarctica to core glaciers for climatological studies.

He was a member of what Brown Alumni Magazine described as the largest medical expedition ever sent to Mount Everest, and he has cross-country skied to the North Pole. In 2004, he joined an archaeological expedition to Yeronisos island in Cyprus that sought the birth temple of Caesarion, son of Cleopatra and Julius Caesar.

Closer to home, Wiese founded the Central Park "BioBlitz", a 24-hour cataloging of all life forms in the park, and in 2006 he co-discovered 202 species in the first microbial survey of Central Park.

In 2009, he led an expedition to Mount Kilimanjaro to bio-prospect for extremophiles and new life forms, which resulted in the discovery of 29 species. The expedition also placed the first weather station on the mountain's slopes, carrying equipment for the Kilimanjaro National Park Service to use in monitoring climate change on the mountain. By 2011, he had led about 15 groups up Kilimanjaro, and his work had extended to sampling fresh lava from a lava lake in Ethiopia to test it for life.

In 2020, Wiese traveled with Prince Albert II of Monaco to the sub-arctic Yukon territory of Canada to retrace the last 42 kilometres of the 1934 expedition to Telegraph Creek by his grandfather.

== The Explorers Club ==
Wiese was first elected president of The Explorers Club in 2002, becoming the youngest president in its history, and served four consecutive one-year terms. He returned as the club's 44th president in 2018, serving until Richard Garriott succeeded him in 2021, and was elected its 46th president in January 2025 for a one-year term that began that April. He has been elected to more terms than anyone else in the club's history. At the end of his third tenure in April 2026, he became president emeritus.

As president, he developed and negotiated multi-year partnerships with Rolex, Eddie Bauer and Discovery Networks, as well as Microsoft. The club also credits him with founding The Explorers Club 50, a program recognizing "Fifty People Changing the World, that the World Needs to Know About", and with establishing its first diversity, equity and inclusion program.

During his second tenure, the club established the Global Exploration Summit (GLEX) in partnership with Portugal; the first summit was held in Lisbon in July 2019 with the support of Turismo de Portugal. The Club credits Wiese with co-chairing GLEX, which he has called "the Davos of exploration". The same year, he was invited to speak at the United Nations on global climate change. In 2020, the Club and Discovery Channel announced a US$1 million expedition grant program, which Wiese described as the largest grant program in the club's history. During his third tenure, GLEX was held in Ottawa in September 2025 with the Royal Canadian Geographical Society, the first time the summit took place in the Americas.

== Media ==
=== Born to Explore ===
Born to Explore with Richard Wiese premiered on September 3, 2011, as one of the original half-hour educational and informational (E/I) programs on Litton's Weekend Adventure, a Saturday morning block on ABC stations in the United States. Wiese is its executive producer and presenter. The series was distributed internationally on National Geographic by Rive Gauche Television. After its final ABC episode on September 24, 2016, it moved to public television stations nationwide in January 2017, presented by WGBH and distributed by American Public Television.

The series received more than a dozen Daytime Emmy nominations and won two Daytime Creative Arts Emmy Awards: Outstanding Achievement in Single Camera Photography in 2013 and Outstanding Sound Mixing – Live Action in 2015. Its nominations included Outstanding Children's Series (2012); Outstanding Travel Program (2013–2015) and its successor category, Outstanding Travel and Adventure Program (2016 and 2019); Outstanding Host in a Lifestyle/Travel Program for Wiese (2014 and 2015); Outstanding Special Class Writing and Outstanding Music Composition and Direction (2014 and 2015); Outstanding Directing in a Lifestyle/Culinary/Travel Program (2014); and Outstanding Sound Mixing (2016). The series has also been honored with the CINE Golden Eagle, numerous Telly Awards and the Parents' Choice Gold Award for teens 13–16.

=== Weekends with Yankee ===
Since 2017, Wiese has co-hosted Weekends with Yankee, a public television travel and lifestyle series about New England produced by Yankee magazine, with the magazine's senior food editor, Amy Traverso. The series began its tenth season in April 2026.

=== Other television and film ===
Before his career in exploration, Wiese worked as a Ford model and as an actor. He had a small part in Endless Love (1981), starring Brooke Shields, and played Christopher in Club Paradise (1986). He went on to host Exploration with Richard Wiese, a series syndicated in the U.S. and distributed internationally; Hell on Earth, which aired on Discovery in the U.S. and the BBC in the UK; and NOW (Network of the World) in London with Brian Cox.

Wiese has also appeared on The Late Late Show with Craig Ferguson, CNN, Dateline, Fox News, the BBC, MSNBC, ABC News, the CBS morning show, Good Morning America and WB11's morning show, and has been featured in USA Today, The New York Times, Newsday, People, Esquire, Science, The Washington Post, National Geographic, the Los Angeles Times, The Times, Wine Spectator and Forbes. In 2003, People named him one of its "Hottest Bachelors".

=== Writing ===
Wiese is the author of the guidebook Born to Explore: How to Be a Backyard Adventurer, published by HarperCollins in 2009.

== Honors ==
Wiese was honored at the 2005 Boy Scout National Jamboree, where he addressed 90,000 people and had a camp named after him. In 2006, American Museum of Natural History Expeditions named him an "Explorer in Residence". At the invitation of King Mohammed VI, he was the U.S. representative to the Moussem of Tan-Tan, a gathering of 45,000 nomadic people in Morocco, and he received a Special Lifetime Achievement Award from the Science Museum of Long Island. As a journalist, he has received numerous honors, including a Genesis Award, an Associated Press Folio Award and a Golden Halo Advertising Award for Best Environmental/Wildlife Campaign, in addition to the Emmy Awards won by Born to Explore. In 2012, he received a Walter Cronkite Award for his contributions to journalism and exploration.

== Personal life ==
Wiese lives in Weston, Connecticut, with his wife and three children.
