= International Scouting Collectors Association =

Memorabilia collectors organization

ISCA Journal November 2004

The International Scouting Collectors Association (ISCA) was established in 2001 as a non-profit group interested in furthering the education of scouting through the trade and display of memorabilia and history of the BSA and Scouting. The ISCA states that [their] "primary purpose is to educate the membership and others regarding Scouting memorabilia and promotion of the ISCA Ethics."

== History ==
The history of the ISCA originated with the American Scouting Traders Association (ASTA) and the National Scouting Collectors Society (NSCS) organizations who worked together to help further the knowledge of scouting memorabilia, and thus the history of supporting young people in their physical, mental and spiritual development. At a 1953 National Jamboree, a group of scouts organized a newsletter called The Trader. Mike Diamond became the first editor, and volunteers help ensure the integrity of scouting memorabilia with its publications.

In 1978 The Trader joined forces with Scouting Collectors Quarterly, and through the years produced several publications of various names, and eventually became known as the National Scouting Collectors Society (NSCS).

On the west coast of the United States, a group of traders established the California Traders Association (CTA) to further promote the collaboration between traders and collectors during a 12-D conference (Note: see: BSA Toloma Lodge for context). The CTA went through several name changes and incarnations through the early and mid 1970s, before becoming known as the American Scouting Traders Association (ASTA) in 1985. The ASTA began attending the National Order of the Arrow Conferences (Note: see: Order of the Arrow for context) in 1990, and by 1994 they boasted over 1000 strong in membership.

Now that the ASTA and NSCS have merged to form the ISCA they have over 1500 members, and a presence in all 50 states, as well as 11 countries worldwide.

== ISCA Journal ==
The ISCA publishes a quarterly journal, the ISCA Journal, ISCA's quarterly publication featuring ISCA functions, Trade-O-Ree information, history of Scouting memorabilia, news of new patches issued, reports on TOR's, Letters to the Editor and lots more.

== See also ==
- Terry L. Grove
