= Richard Wiese Sr. =

American aviator (1929–2021)

Richard Wiese (September 25, 1929 – September 18, 2021) was an American aviator. He entered the record books on August 14, 1959 when he became the first pilot to solo an airplane from east to west across the Pacific Ocean. The route was from San Francisco, California to Sydney, Australia. The New York Times (January 30, 1983) referred to him as the "Lone Eagle of the Pacific".

Wiese was not attempting to set a record or enter the history books at the time of his flight, and he wasn't even aware that his flight would be notable. In 1959, Wiese was a pilot for Pan American Airlines when he heard rumors of mass layoffs at the airline. To provide a second source of income, he started ferrying planes as a side job. Since Pan-Am did not allow its pilots to do side jobs, he worked under the alias Richard Merrick. He was hired to fly an aircraft from San Antonio, Texas to Sydney, Australia.

Wiese flew the Cessna 310B from San Antonio to San Francisco, where his cross-Pacific journey began. On the first leg of his flight to Hawaii, he periodically kept himself awake by banging his head against the window during the 14-hour flight. After Hawaii, he stopped in Kanton Island and Fiji, before his final destination in Australia. At these stops, other pilots commented that they had never seen a pilot make the trip solo before.

Upon arriving at Sydney at night, he noticed spotlights and a crowd of people at the airport. Pilots and journalists correctly realized that he had made the first solo east-to-west flight across the Pacific Ocean. While they had arranged a party for Wiese, he instead went to a hotel to sleep. The next day, the newspapers reported his accomplishment, using his real name, which they had got from the customs documents.

The flight time for the 7,730 mile flight was 42½ hours over 6 days. (August 6, 1959 - Special to The New York Times. - Article)

== Personal life and death ==
Wiese's son, Richard Wiese, is a known explorer, environmentalist, and Emmy-winning television host and executive producer.

Richard Wiese Sr. died on September 18, 2021, at the age of 91.
