= Yeronisos =

Uninhabited island west of Cyprus

Native name: Γερόνησος
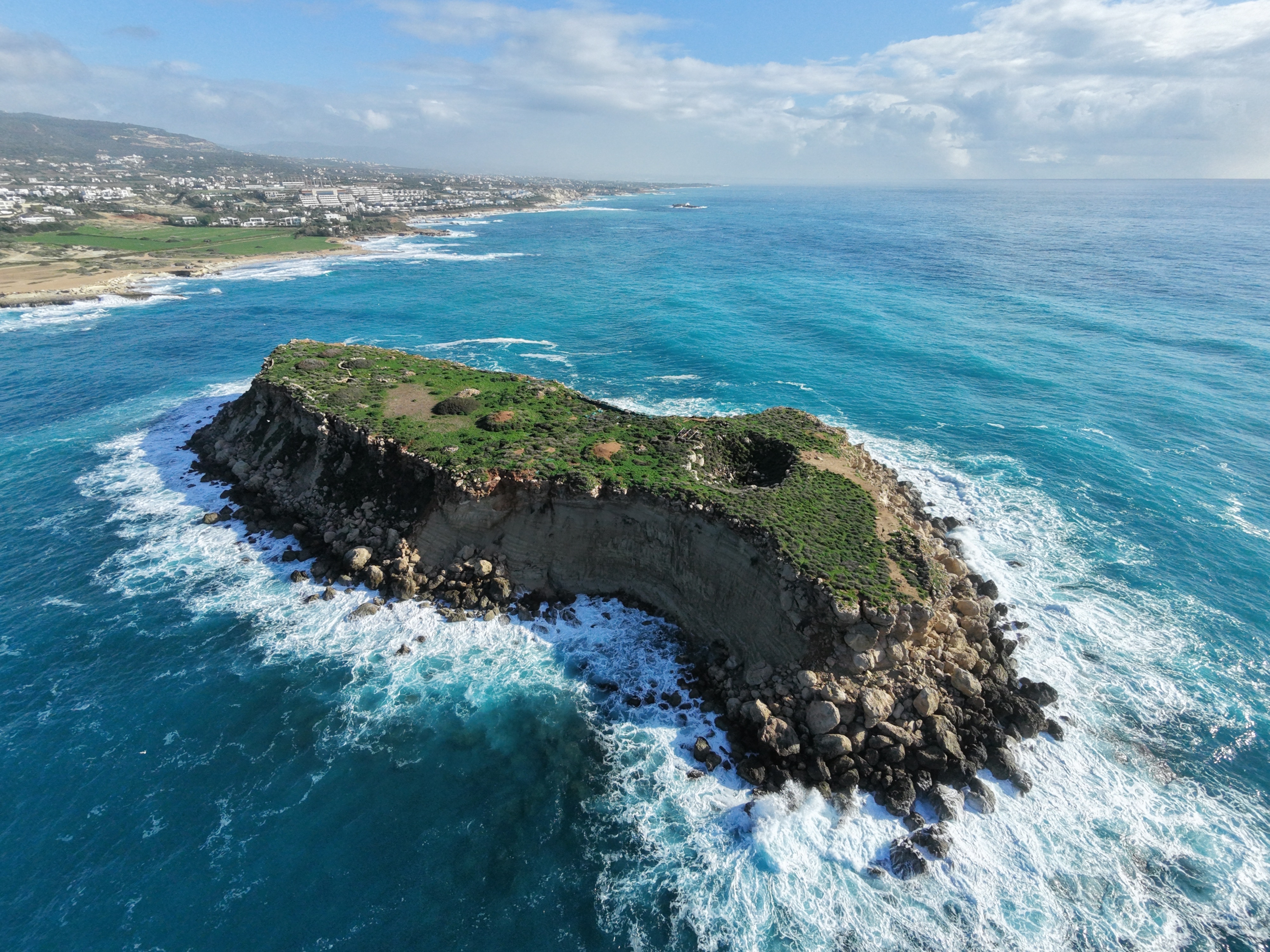
- Yeronisos Island
- Interactive map of Yeronisos

Geography
- Location: Cyprus
- Coordinates: 34.90°N 32.31°E
- Archipelago: Cyprus
- Area: 26,000 m^{2} (280,000 sq ft)

Administration
- Cyprus

Demographics
- Population: 0

Yeronisos or Geronisos (Greek: Γερόνησος or Ιερόνησος; transl. Holy Island) is a small island lying off the west coast of Cyprus, some 18 kilometres north of Paphos. Uninhabited since the 15th century, recent excavations have revealed it once held a sanctuary dedicated to Apollo in the late Hellenistic period.

== Description ==
The island which lies 280 metres from the shore of western Cyprus has been uninhabited since the 14th or 15th century. It has an area of 26,000 square metres and rises 21.65 metres from sea level. Geologically the island consists of a hard calcarenite crust of Pleistocene marine terraces overlying a soft marl core.

The toponym "Holy Island" is an ancient one. Pliny speaks of an island called "Hiera," near Paphos, and Strabo mentions a place called "Hierocepis" nearby Paphos and Akamas. It is likely that the name refers to the Apollo sanctuary that stood there in the 1st century BC.

== Excavations ==
The island was first excavated in 1982 by Sophocles Hadjisavvas following a proposal to build a hotel on the island. He quickly established the presence of Hellenistic remains on the island, which halted all further attempts to build on the island. In 1989, Joan Breton Connelly from New York University heard about the work and impressed by the range of the material joined the excavations which have continued since then.

The excavations have established three periods of occupation on Yeronisos. Early Chalcolithic (3800 BC), late Hellenistic (80-30 BC), and Byzantine (6th-7th century and 13th century). The most intense of this activity is the late Hellenistic period at a time when Cleopatra ruled Cyprus. Artefacts include coins, pottery, glass, and inscriptions. Limestone amulets, identical to those used in Cypriot sanctuaries of Apollo, point to ritual activity and the worship of Apollo. The island was apparently abandoned following a devastating earthquake in 1st century BC/AD. Low-level activity on the island begins again in the 6th century AD. when a reservoir and animal shelters were built.
