= Boy Scouts of America centennial =

Boy Scouts of America Centennial
- Theme: Celebrating the Adventure, Continuing the Journey
- Date: September 1, 2009 – December 31, 2010
- Website; Centennial Site

The Boy Scouts of America Centennial was a special event to celebrate its centennial that took place from September 1, 2009, through December 31, 2010. It celebrated its incorporation on February 8, 1910.

== Uniform ==
The Boy Scout uniform was redesigned for 2010.

All rank patches (Including Eagle Scout and Arrow of Light) were redesigned to include 2010 for the Centennial Year. These patches were only issued to those who earned the respective rank during the Centennial year.

== Centennial Handbook ==
For the Boy Scouts of America Centennial, a new centennial handbook was released in July 2009. The handbook had many features returned that were removed years ago and put into the BSA field handbook. Two new youth leadership positions were added: Webmaster and Leave No Trace Trainer. The book is organized by topic now rather than by rank.

=== Merit Badges ===
The Scouting Heritage Merit Badge.

Historical Merit Badge Program: Four historical merit badges were available only in 2010: Signaling, Tracking, Pathfinding, and Carpentry. These discontinued merit badges were brought back without change. A special patch was released for each merit badge. The availability of these badges was official as of April 1, 2010.

- Signaling has Flag semaphore and Morse code. Signaling started in 1911 and was discontinued in 1992.
- Pathfinding started in 1911 and was discontinued in 1952. Pathfinding is similar to the current Orienteering and Citizenship In The Community merit badges
- Carpentry started in 1911 and was discontinued in 1952.
- Tracking was called Stalking, started in 1915 and was discontinued in 1952.

Although a limited number of new merit badges are created and introduced regularly, Scouting Heritage, a new standard Merit Badge, was specifically released in April 2010 as part of Boy Scouts of America's centennial celebration.

== Logo ==
1 of the 44 authorized variants of the 2010 BSA Centennial Logo

In late 2007, a contest was held by the BSA for a design for the centennial logo. An essay on how the logo related to the centennial theme was required for each entry. From over 4,000 submissions, the entry of Philip Goolkasian, an Eagle Scout from Fresno, California, was selected.

== Jamboree ==
Since 1969, Boy Scouts of America National Jamborees have normally been scheduled every 4 years. The previous National Jamboree was conducted in 2005 but the 2010 National Scout Jamboree was specifically scheduled out-of-cycle to coincide with the centennial. The next Jamboree was scheduled for 2013 in synchronization with the normal schedule.

The theme for the National Jamboree was "Celebrating the Adventure, Continuing the Journey".

== Programs ==
The BSA is celebrating the centennial through eight national programs:

- The BSA Alumni Connection aims to reconnect former members with the Scouting program.
- The National Hall of Leadership recognizes Scout leaders who influenced youth.
- Generations Connection allows families to share their Scouting history.
- Get In The Game! Geocaching will involve several nationwide geocaching programs along with service.
- Year of Celebration is a recognition program with requirements for leadership, character, community service, achievement and the outdoors. Requirements are grouped for Cub Scouts, Boy Scouts, Venturers, adult leaders and alumni.
- Adventure Base 100 is a traveling exhibit featuring a museum, a ropes course and a surround theater.
- A Shining Light Across America will be a special nationwide broadcast on July 31, 2010, from the 100th Anniversary National Jamboree.
- Pitch for Scouting.

== Insignia and memorabilia ==
The Embroidered Centennial Ring Emblem is a ring shaped patch worn around the World Crest and over the left pocket. It may be worn by any member in recognition of the centennial.

The United States Mint issued 350,000 commemorative centennial silver dollar coins after a bill was signed into law on October 8, 2008, by President George W. Bush.

The United States Postal Service presented the Celebrate Scouting stamp on November 12, 2009.

On January 1, 2010, the BSA had a float in the Tournament of Roses Parade. Also, over 300 Eagle Scouts marched in the Parade. Organized by the San Gabriel Valley Council in Pasadena, California.
