= Tracking (Scouting) =

Element of scouting that focuses on following a trail

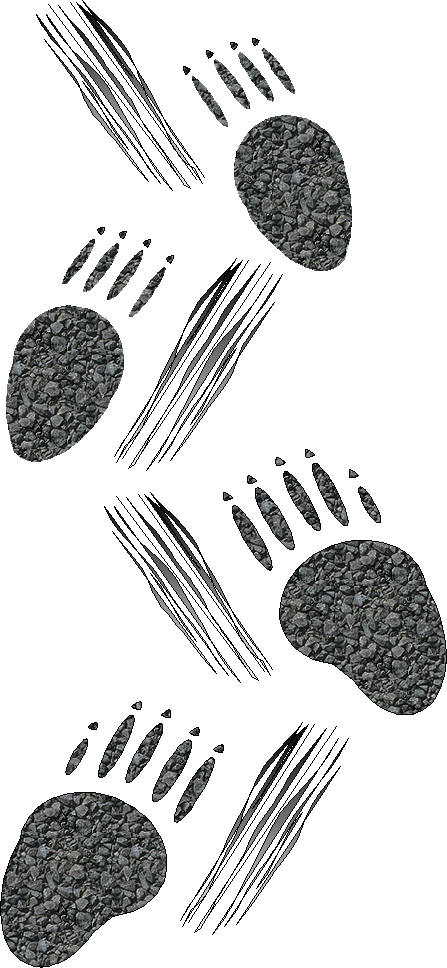
Illustration of Porcupine tracks

Tracking is an element of scouting that encompasses observation, stalking and the following of a trail. Unlike the form of tracking employed in hunting, tracking within the Scouting movement tends to focus on the tracking of people as well as animals. One form of training includes the laying a trail or following a trail laid by others. A trail is made up of a series of signs, largely comprising directions, which are laid on the ground.

== History ==
Tracking has been part of scouting and guiding since the beginning; it was the subject of several of Baden-Powell's campfire yarns. In the eleventh he wrote that "One of the most important things that a Scout has to learn... is to let nothing escape his attention". He suggested several methods of learning observational skills, such as Kim's Game and other memory games. Following this, in yarn twelve, he wrote about spooring, relating to the tracking of people and animals. Scouts were encouraged to identify the difference between the tracks of different animals, as well as determining the age of the tracks and the pace of movement. It was in the thirteenth yarn that Baden-Powell introduced sign based tracking, where scouts were encouraged to deduce the location of a person or animal by following signs. The purpose of training scouts in tracking skills was to encourage observation and to make it possible for them to stalk animals for observation, or hunting as food.

The basic Tracking signs that all guides and scouts learn include "This way","No Entry or Danger", "Turn Left", "Turn Right", "Water Ahead", "Obstacle ahead", Split Group", Message _ paces this way" and of course "Gone home"

== Observation ==
Tracking also involves interpreting the calls and movements of animals to determine whether other people are nearby.

== Bibliography ==
- Gilcraft (1944), Training in Tracking (fourth edition reprint ed.), London: C. Arthur Pearson
- Baden-Powell, Robert (1908), Scouting For Boys (1954 revision ed.)
