= Orienteering (scouting) =

Orienteering is a longtime component of Scouting programs such as the Boy Scouts of America and other Scouting groups. The BSA first class rank requires that scouts complete a one-mile orienteering course by using a map and compass. The Scout must also measure the height of objects, such as trees, using simple trigonometry. Although some troops tend to emphasize the use of compass bearings and pacing, orienteering actually involves a variety of skills, including map reading and route solving.

== Merit badge ==
In 1974, the orienteering merit badge was introduced. This badge was developed in collaboration with the US Orienteering Federation and introduces Scouts to the sport of orienteering that arose in Europe during the early 20th century. After developing the basic Scoutcraft skills of map and compass, Scouts are required to participate in several competitive style orienteering courses. They must then design their own course, and teach orienteering skills to other members of their troop. The exact requirements have changed over the years. At one time, the merit badge was called "Pathfinding" and was required for Eagle.
