= Uniform and insignia of Scouting America =

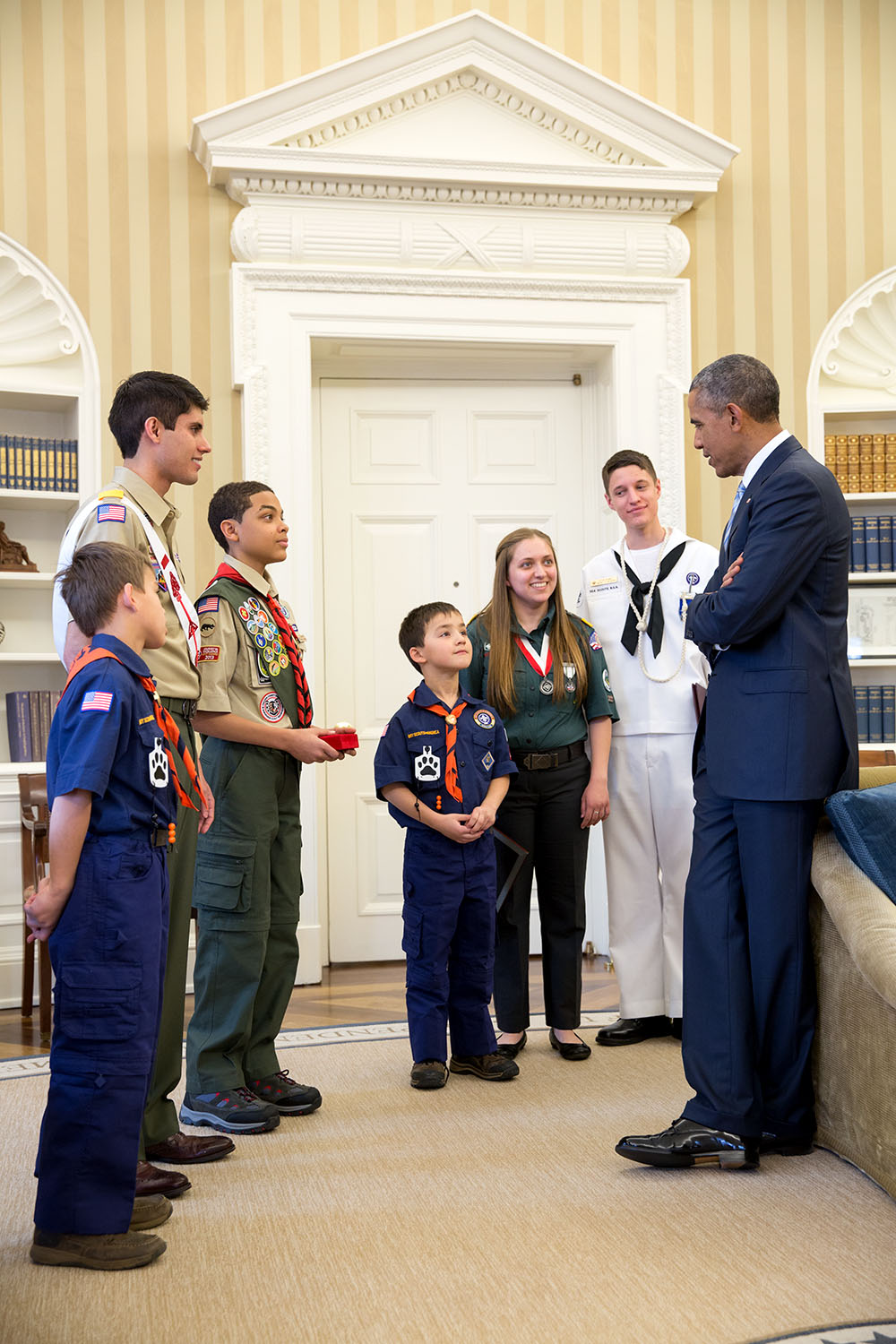
- Then President and BSA Honorary Chair Barack Obama with Cub Scouts, Scouts, Venturers, and Sea Scouts in field uniforms in the Oval Office
- Age range: Learning for Life: Pre-K through 12th grade; Cub Scouts: 5–10; Scouts BSA: 10–18; Venturing: 14–21; Exploring Club (LFL): 10-15; Sea Scouts: 14–21; Exploring Post (LFL): 16-20; Scout Leader: 18+ for Cub Scouts and Scouts BSA; 21+ for Venturing and Sea Scouting
- Headquarters: Irving, Texas
- Location: United States, Europe, Japan and South Korea
- Country: United States
- Affiliation: Boy Scouts of America; World Organization of the Scout Movement
- Website scouting.org

Scouting America use uniforms and insignia to give a Scout visibility and create a level of identity within both the unit and the community. The uniform is used to promote equality while showing individual achievement. While all uniforms are similar in basic design, they do vary in color and detail to identify the different membership divisions of Cub Scouting, Scouts BSA, Sea Scouts, and Venturing. Many people collect BSA insignia such as camporee and jamboree emblems, council shoulder strips and historical badges. The uniform is one of eight methods of Scouting used to deliver on Scouting America's mission and fulfill the aims of Scouting.

== History ==
=== Boy Scouts ===
==== Green uniforms ====
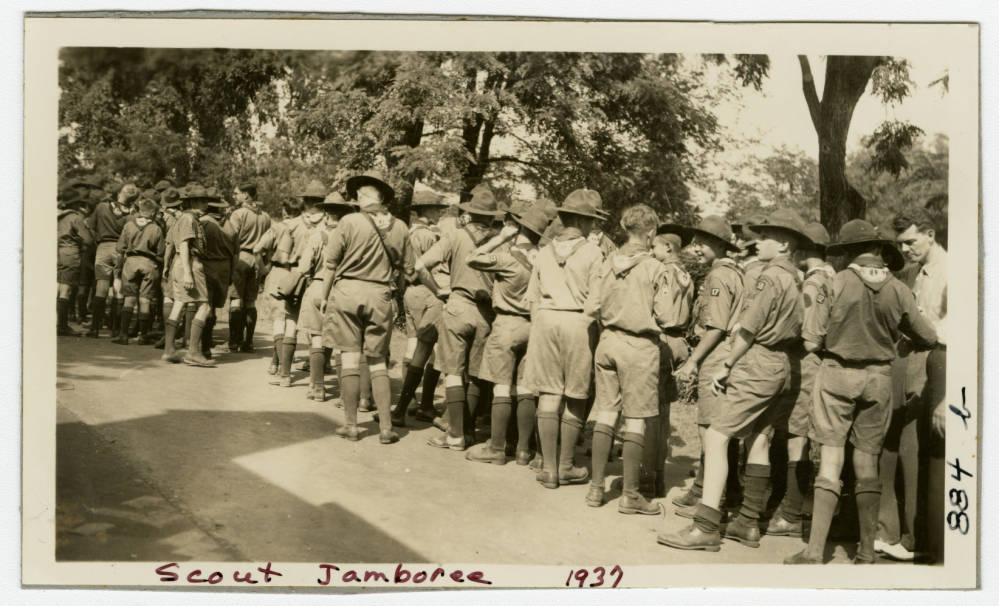
Scouts in uniform during the First National Jamboree in Washington, D.C. in 1937

Early Boy Scout uniforms were copies of the U.S. Army uniforms of the time. Scouts generally wore knickers with leggings, a button-down choke-collar coat and the campaign hat. Adults wore a Norfolk jacket with knickers or trousers. In 1916, Congress banned civilians from wearing uniforms that were similar in appearance to those of the U.S. armed forces with the exception of the BSA. The uniform was redesigned in 1923—the coat and leggings were dropped and the neckerchief standardized. In the 1930s, shorts replaced knickers and their wear was encouraged by the BSA. The garrison (flat) cap was introduced in 1943. In 1965, the uniform's material was changed from wool and cotton to permanent press cloth, although the older material uniforms continued to be sold and used through the late 1960s. The Improved Scouting Program in 1972 included a major overhaul of badges and other insignia, replacing many two-color patches with multicolor versions. Also introduced was a red beret and a dark green shirt for "Leadership Corps" members (ages 14–15) in a Scout troop. This was done to relate those older Boy Scouts to Explorers, which wore the same uniform shirt, but by the early 1980s, the red beret and the Leadership Corps concept had been discarded.

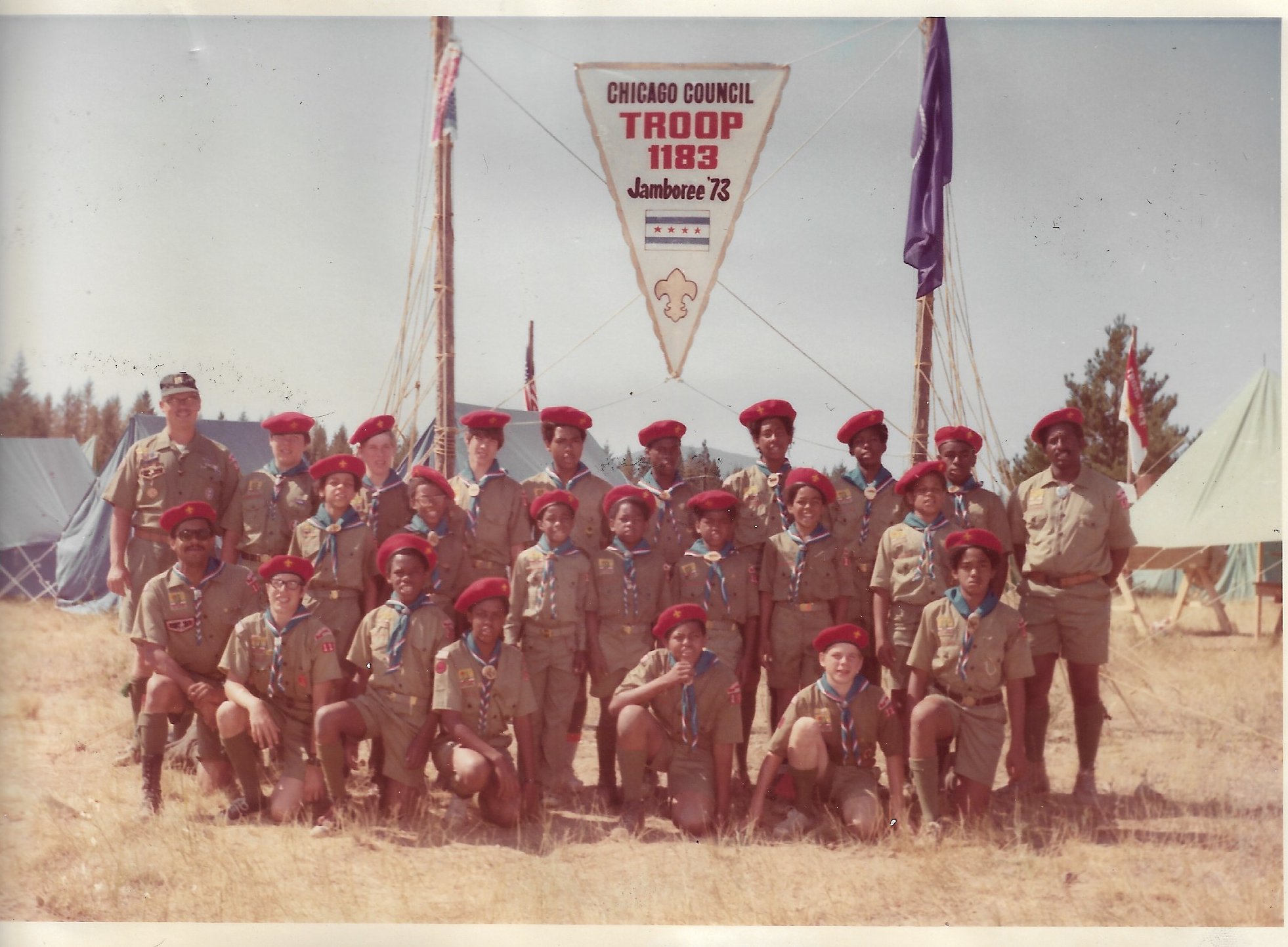
Scouts and Scouters wearing the red beret at the 1973 Boy Scout Jamboree

The Boy Scout uniform during the 1950s–1970s continued to have a monochrome light green (khaki-green) color for both shirts and shorts or trousers.

==== Tan uniforms ====
In 1980, a major change was made when a two-color uniform having a tan shirt with olive green shorts or trousers was introduced. Designed by Oscar de la Renta, it continued to be the uniform until August 2008, when the "Centennial Scout Uniform" was unveiled. The Oscar de la Renta-designed tan buttoned-front uniform shirt had shoulder epaulets and buttoned-down pocket flaps, worn with an olive green webbed belt with a brass buckle or a tan or brown-leather belt. The olive green cap had a bright red front panel and gold fleur-de-lis. In 2006, olive-green "Switchback" zip-off trousers were introduced in place of the traditional trousers, having an integral belt assembly with provisions for either the olive green webbed or brown-leather belt. Socks were olive green with a red band at the top and came in crew or ankle lengths, or knee length for wear with shorts. Female leaders were provided a choice of slacks, shorts, culottes, or a skirt.

=== Explorers ===
Explorers in the 1950s–1970s had a uniform of spruce green shirt and trousers, but by the 1970s many posts were developing their own uniform. Eventually only the shirt was available, leading many to wear the shirt with olive green Boy Scout pants or shorts. When Exploring was moved to Learning for Life in 1998, the new Venturing division used the spruce green shirt with charcoal gray pants.

=== Sea Scouts ===
For most of their history, Sea Scouts wore modified US Navy uniforms. Youth wore the enlisted "crackerjack" uniforms, and adults wore officer's uniforms, both of which were usually for more formal occasions. The standard work uniforms during this time were dungarees for youth and officer's khakis for adults. Sea Scouts who had reached the rank of Quartermaster wore adult uniforms, roughly analogous to a chief petty officer wearing an officer's uniform instead of an enlisted man's. To avoid confusion for active duty personnel, modifications were made such as wearing square knot insignia instead of ribbons, strips that read "SEA SCOUTS B.S.A.," silver brass instead of gold, and standard BSA insignia such as the WOSM crest, council shoulder patches, US Flag patches, etc. Notably absent from the uniform during this time were Order of the Arrow flaps. Following 9/11, The Navy tightened security making it extremely difficult for units to get on base to purchase Navy uniforms. It was replaced by the New Century uniform.

The uniform had, for some years, been referred to as the "field uniform", but the BSA now uses the terms "official Boy Scout uniform", "official Venturing uniform" and the like. With the introduction of the Switchbacks zip-off pants, the trend is towards a uniform emphasizing comfort and utility.

=== Discontinued uniforms and insignia ===
The official policy of the BSA is that any uniform or insignia that has ever been approved for use is still acceptable. However, the condition of the insignia must not distract from the overall appearance of the uniform. In addition, exact reproductions or "private issue" are not allowed to be worn.

== Current uniform ==
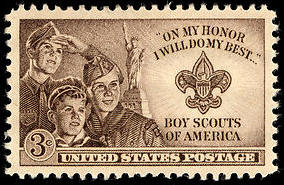
1950 3¢ US stamps showing the hats of the era

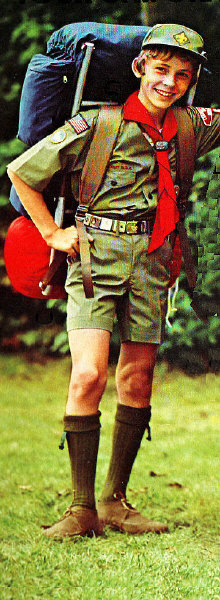
BSA uniform in the mid-1970s; shirt and shorts of the same color, with an optional baseball-style cap

The uniform and insignia are variously protected by copyright, trademark, and congressional charter. The BSA does allow usage for movies, television shows and other events, but this is done on a case-by-case basis. The BSA has rebuked instances where it was felt that the uniform was used inappropriately and without permission. BSA rules and regulations also forbid the use of Scouting emblems for commercial or political purposes. Wear of the uniform and insignia is described in the various handbooks, the Guide to Awards and Insignia and inspection sheets.

=== Scouts BSA uniform ===
==== Shirt ====
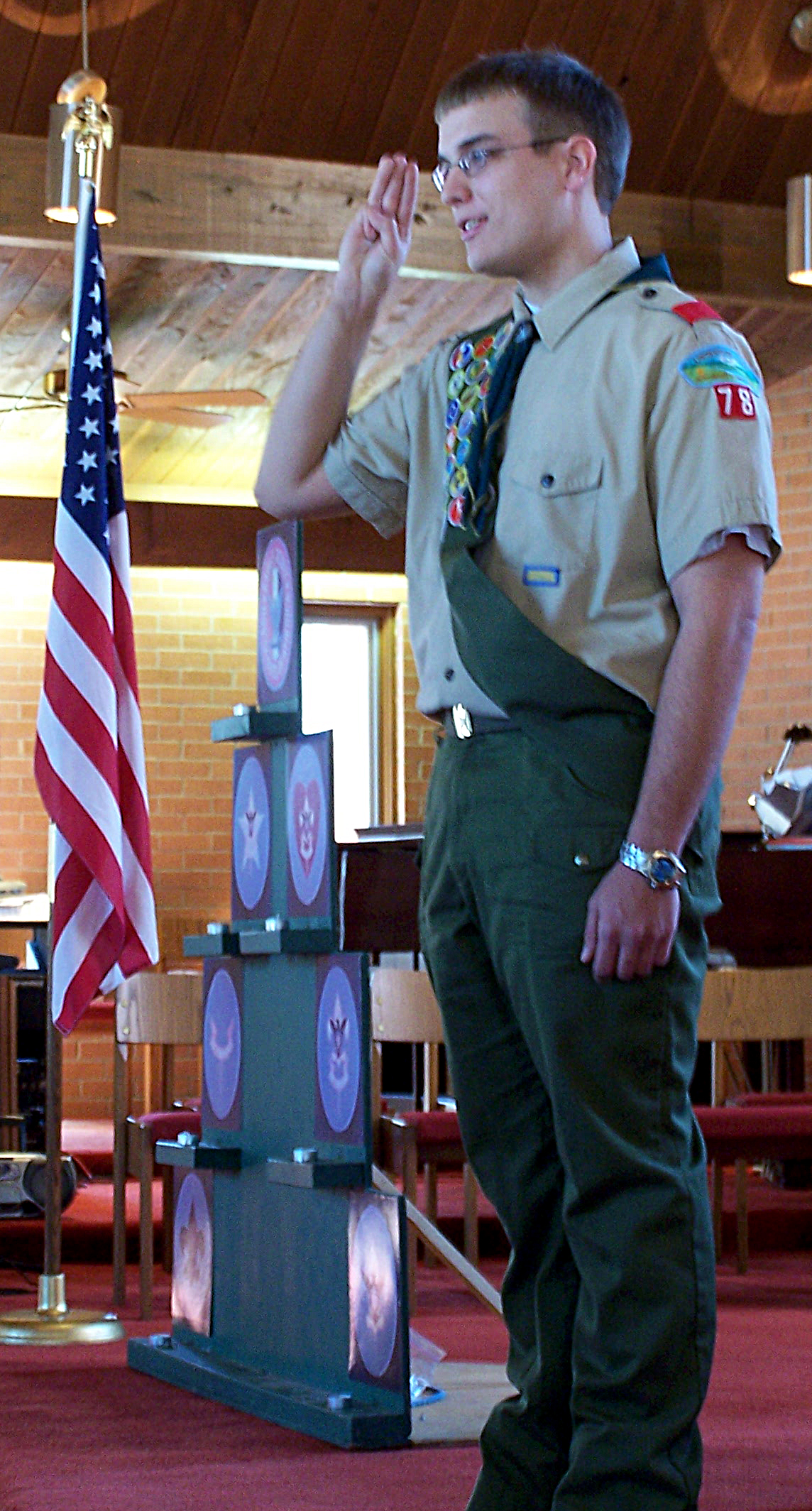
A Boy Scout in the 1980–2008 uniform designed by Oscar de la Renta

With the inclusion of girls in the Boy Scout (renamed to Scouts BSA) program, starting February 1, 2019 a new tan uniform shirt has been approved and is available for purchase. The new tan shirt features a red Fleur de lis symbol and red 'BSA' text in place of the 'Boy Scouts of America' text. Also available as an option for boys and girls are new olive green capris uniform pants.

The previous official Boy Scout uniform, known as the Centennial Scout Uniform, was named in tribute to the organization's 100th anniversary in 2010. The uniform may be worn by adult leaders, Scouts, and Webelos Scouts. Introduced on August 15, 2008, to have a more outdoors-activity oriented appearance, the Centennial Scout Uniform transitionally replaced the previous version designed by Oscar de la Renta. The Boy Scouts of America declared this uniform "transitional", meaning that those possessing the de la Renta uniform may not only still wear it (as is the case with any previously authorized uniforms) but that they may interchange parts with the new uniform as well (mainly to solve issues with shirt and pants which were not ready for wide-scale manufacturing at the time). The uniform "transitional" status ended in 2011. Except as clearance items however, council and BSA stores was no longer selling the de la Renta uniform.

There were two versions of the Centennial shirt. The first version was a khaki (officially referred by BSA as tan) button-front shirt with collar, bellowed pockets on the chest and featured a special technology pocket on the left shoulder. This was designed to allow Scouts and Scouters to place their personal cell phone or media player in that pocket. A hole at the bottom of the pocket allowed an earpiece to be to connected to the item. Many Scouters referred to the pocket as the "cigarette pocket" for its size and lack of real usability. The BSA redesigned the shirt and removed the pocket. The current version of the Centennial shirt is a khaki (officially referred by BSA as tan) button-front shirt with collar, bellowed pockets on the chest and closed with hook-and-loop closures, and shoulder epaulets with shoulder loops in the color of the individual's registration (see above).

==== Pants ====
Male adults and Scouts wear forest green or khaki convertible or Switchback zip-off cargo pants, which easily convert to knee-length cargo shorts with the pull of a zipper. Female leaders can select the shorts or roll-up pants.

==== Accessories ====
Socks, worn with the uniform, are olive green and have a black "B.S.A." monogrammed at the top and are available in crew and ankle lengths. The new official belt is a forest green rigger style belt with a black metal mechanical claw buckle – other belt styles, mostly in tan or brown leather, are also worn.

Headgear is optional for Leaders. Boy Scout Leaders wear the olive cap, campaign hat (colloquially called the "Smokey Bear" hat, which hearkens back to Scouting's inception in 1907) or troop-approved headgear. Varsity Scout leaders wear the blaze visor cap, Cub Scout leader wear the olive visor cap and den leader wear the same visored cap as the youth they serve (wolf, bear, etc.). Scouts must wear the headgear voted by the troop.

Neckwear on both uniforms includes the neckerchief and the bolo tie as selected by the unit. A variety of official neckerchiefs are available, or the troop can create their own design. Many troops now opt not to wear neckwear. Special neckerchiefs such as Eagle Scout or Wood Badge are generally worn on formal occasions.

Older, all-olive green uniforms from the 1970s and earlier may still be worn by Scouters who possess them, although parts may not be worn interchangeably with the current Centennial Scout Uniform or the de la Renta-designed uniforms. They are prized by Scouting memorabilia collectors from around the country.

=== Cub Scout uniform ===
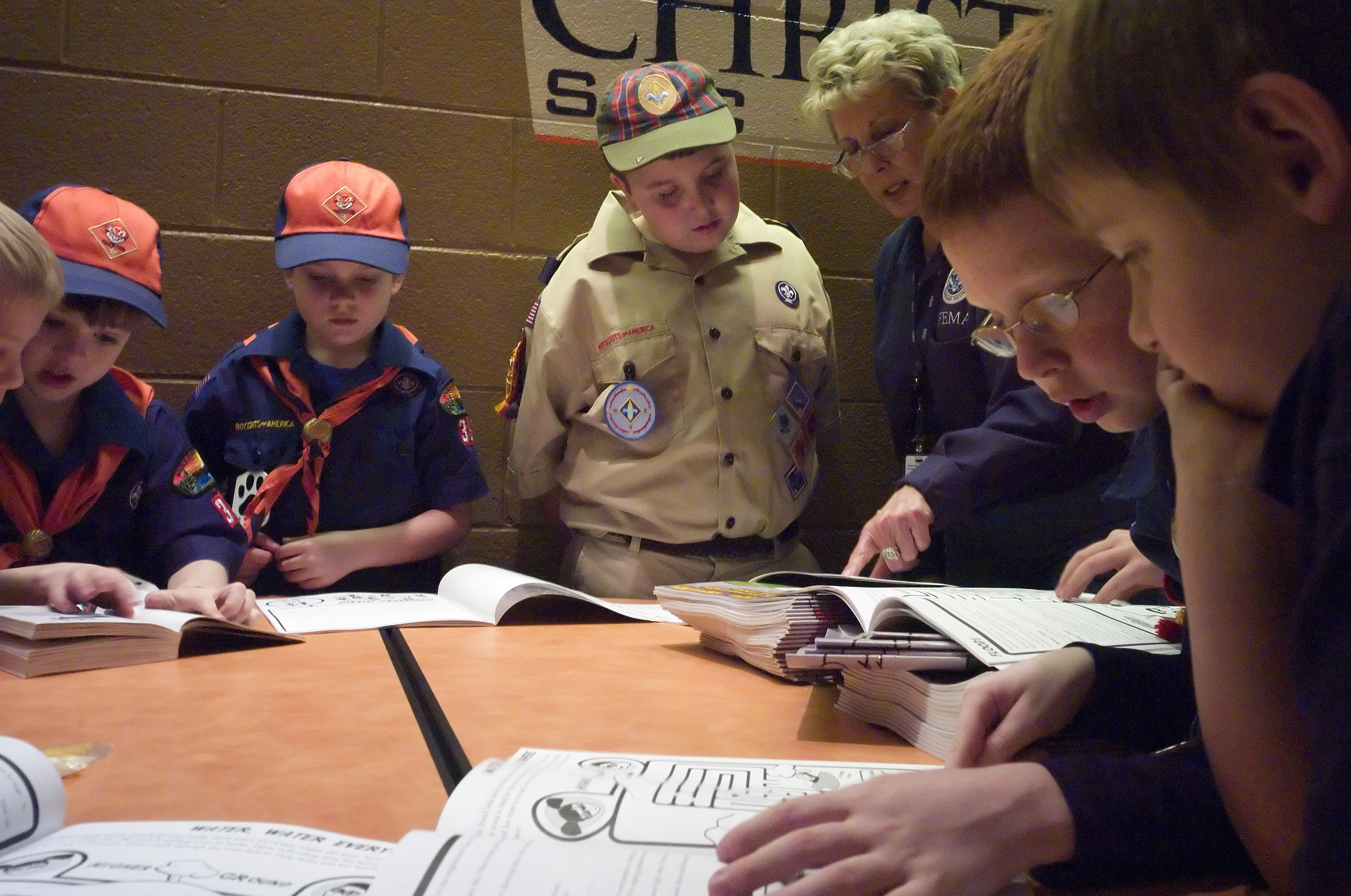
Tigers in their navy blue uniform and a Webelos in his tan uniform

Both male and female wear the same uniform in Cub Scouts.

- Lion: Cub Scouts wear a unique blue T-shirt with large Lion rank image and 'LION' text, navy blue shorts or skorts, the official Lion cap, an optional yellow neckerchief and slide.
- Tiger, Wolf and Bear: A navy blue buttoned down shirt, navy blue pants, shorts, skorts or roll up pants and a navy blue web belt with brass buckle with Cub Scout logo. The neckerchief, hat and slide change every year and have a different logo and color for each level. Orange for Tiger, Red for Wolf and light blue for Bear. Navy blue socks with matching color tops for Cub Scouts are sometimes worn.
- Webelos and Arrow of Light: The basic uniform is identical to the Scouts: A tan shirt, green shorts, long pants or skorts and a green belt. The neckerchief, slide and hat have the Webelos logo on the Webelos plaid (Tartan). Unlike the Scouts who wear green loops, they wear blue shoulder loops.

==== Optional female Cub Scout leader uniform ====
Female leaders in Cub Scouting have the option of wearing the yellow blouse with navy blue pants, shorts, skirt or culottes instead of the Scouts BSA tan uniform. The yellow blouse, though, is less common since it has been discontinued for years.

=== Venturing uniform ===
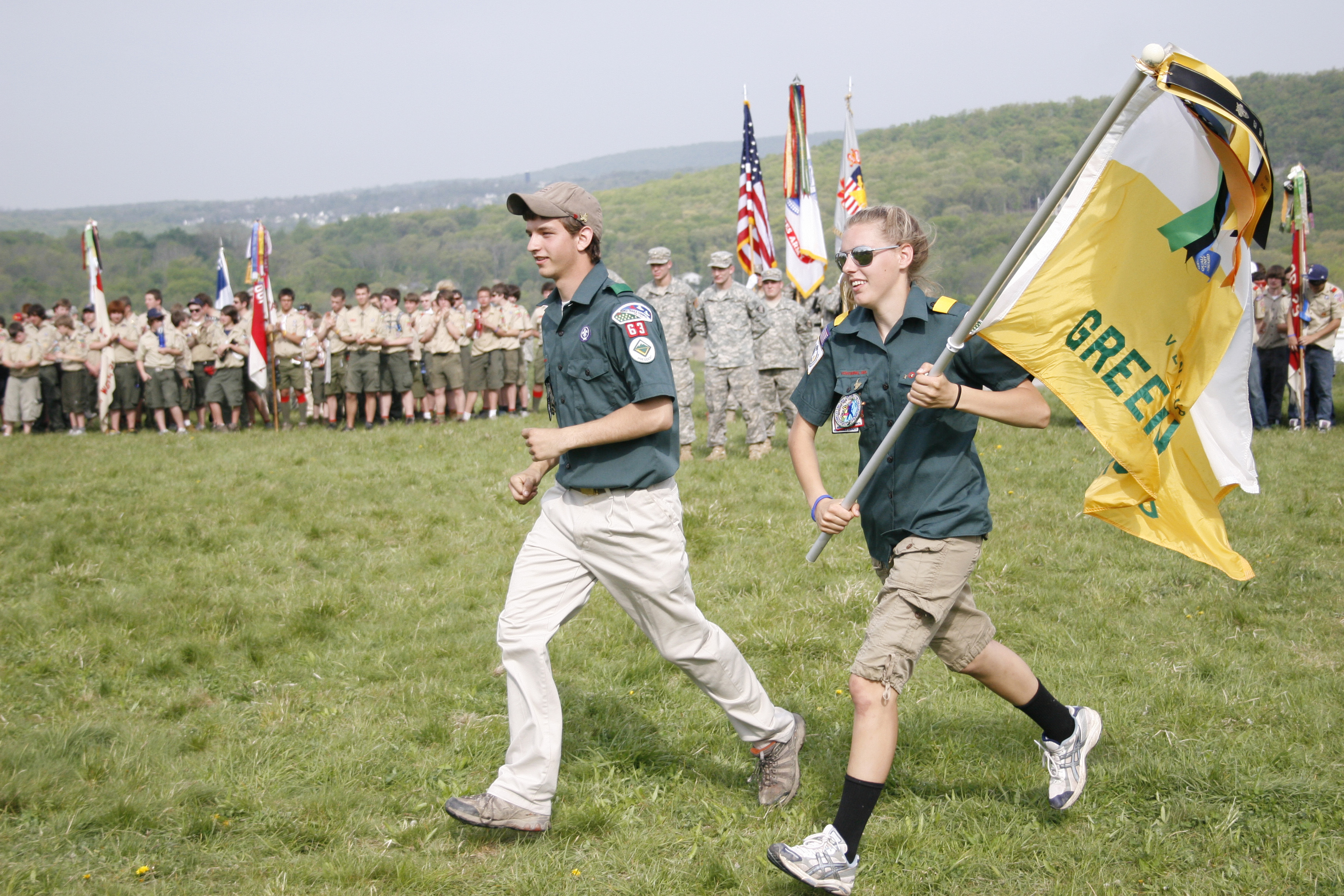
Example of a Venturing uniform

Each Venturing crew votes on the desired uniform; they may use either the official Venturing uniform or may develop their own. Other than emblems, crew developed uniforms may not use elements of other BSA uniforms and must meet other uniform standards, such as not resembling military uniforms. Venturers may not wear the Boy Scout uniform.

The official Venturing uniform consists of the spruce green button-up shirt available only in short sleeves, charcoal gray shorts or trousers, gray socks with Venturing logo and the gray web belt with brass buckle and Venturing logo or the black riggers style belt with Venturing logo.

Original hats were the gray baseball cap or the gray bushman hat with snap-up brim, both with Venturing logos. These were replaced by the Venturing ultra-shield uniform cap in gray with a removable fabric shield.

Venturers may develop a unique crew emblem that, with approval from the Scout executive, may be worn on the right sleeve of the uniform.

A male Venturer who earned rank as a Boy Scout may wear the rank emblem centered on the left pocket. Venturers who earned rank as a Venturer wear this rank emblem centered on the left pocket.

=== Sea Scout uniform ===
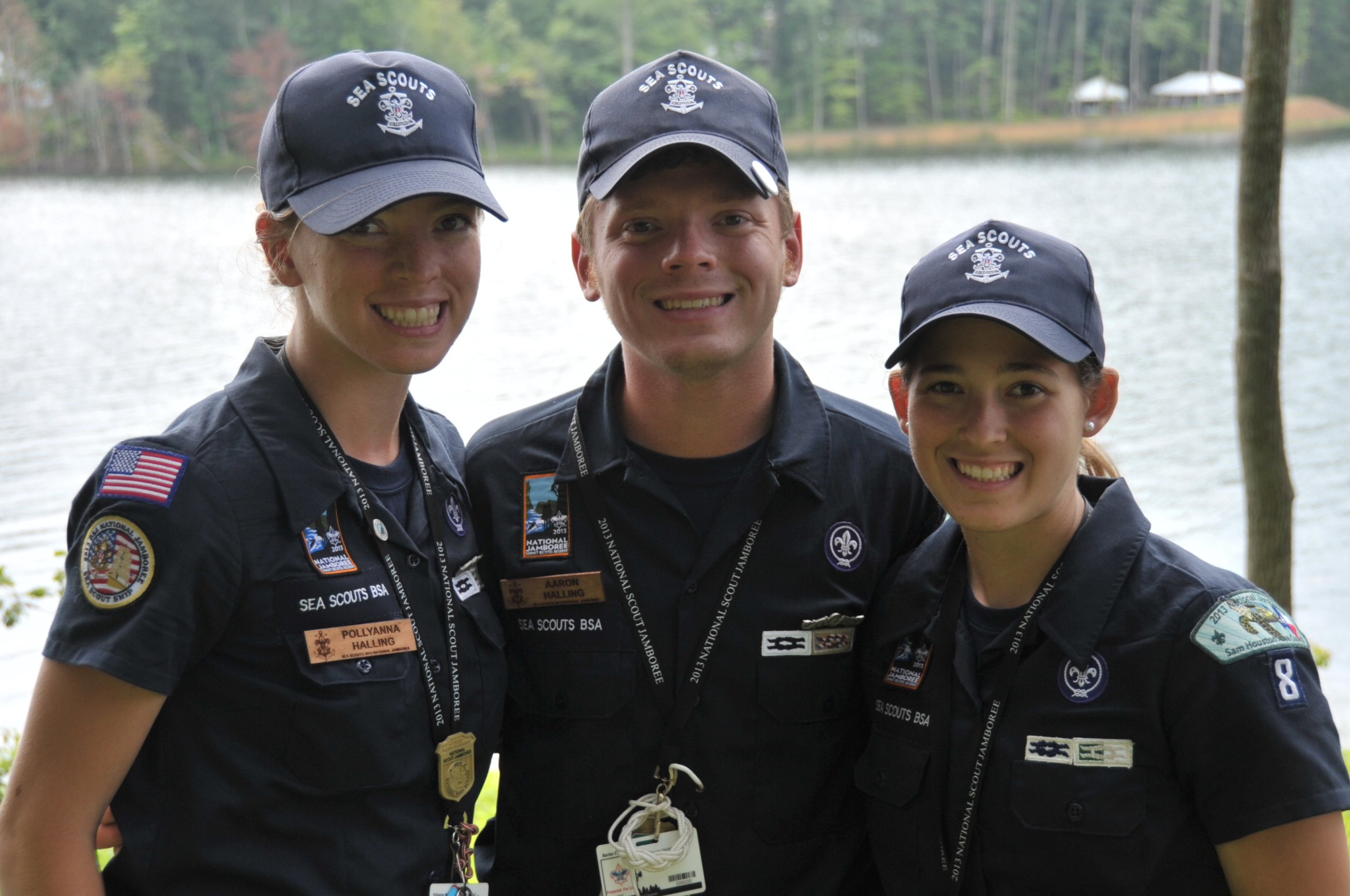
Sea Scout uniform

The official Sea Scout uniform is designed to make it easy for members to outfit themselves in a Sea Scout uniform. This universal uniform is worn by all youth and adult Ship members and serves as both a dress uniform and a work uniform.

Sea Scout uniform components:

- Navy Blue ball cap, No. 618623; with SEA SCOUTS and the Sea Scout logo embroidered in white.
- Dark Navy Blue shirt; similar to Dickies Nos. 1574DN (male) and FS574DN (female), color DN, dark navy.
- Dark Navy Blue T-shirt.
- Dark Navy Blue pants; similar to Dickies Nos. 874DN (male) and 774DN (female), color DN, dark navy.
- Black web belt and buckle with Sea Scout logo, No. 618624.
- Black plain-toe shoes and black socks. Or, activity footwear such as boat shoes, hiking boots, or athletic shoes.
- Optional Neckerchiefs (unit option)

Youth and adults may wear No.618625; black triangular design (unit option). The "tar flap" design, No. 618626, is reserved for youth only (unit option).

=== Scouter dress uniform ===
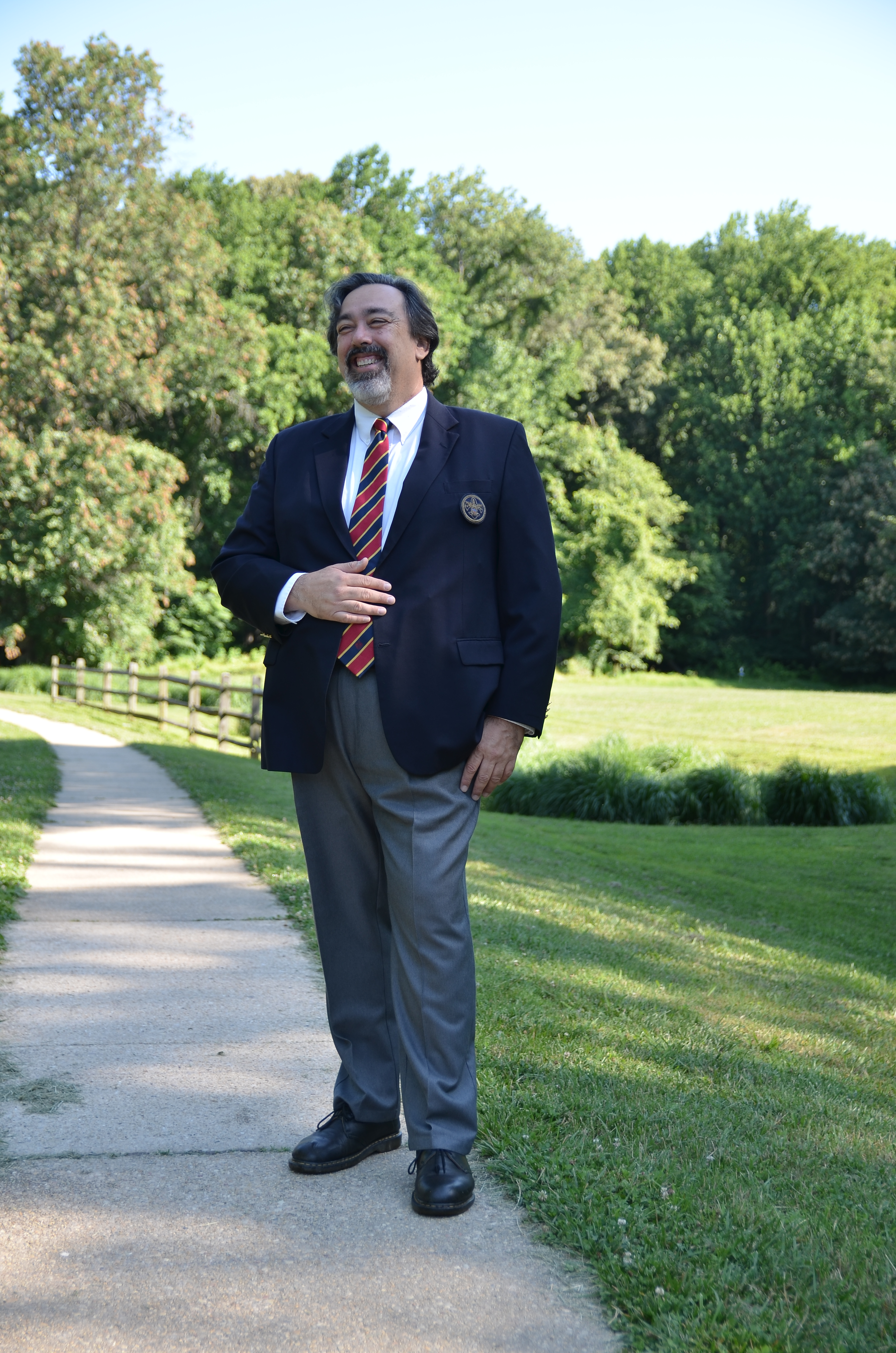
Dress uniform

The Scouter dress uniform is appropriate for professional Scouters and all Scouting leaders on formal occasions. The current version consists of a dark-blue, two-button blazer with white shirt or blouse and heather gray trousers, slacks or a skirt. The blazer's gold-plated buttons bear the universal emblem and an embroidered Cub Scout, Boy Scout or Venturing emblem is worn on the left pocket or lapel. A black leather belt with gold buckle is to be worn with trousers or slacks. Silk neckties with red, gold, and navy stripes are available for men and women. Black dress shoes and black socks or stockings are worn with the dress uniform.

=== Order of the Arrow ===
Members of the Order of the Arrow (Scouting's National Honor Society, known commonly as the OA) are generally distinguished by the pocket flap patches worn on the right pocket flap of the field uniform. Only dues-paying members of the featured lodge may wear that lodge's flap. At OA events and when serving as a representative of the OA, members wear a sash that communicates their honor level. An ordeal member wears a white sash with a red arrow on it. Brotherhood members wear a white sash with a red arrow as well, but also have a horizontal red bar above and below the arrow. Vigil Honor members wear the same sash as Brotherhood members, but additionally have a vigil triangle in the center of the arrow. In all cases, the sash is worn over the right shoulder (through the epaulet) with the arrow pointing up, and is never worn either on the belt or at the same time as the merit badge sash.

== Insignia ==
Various insignia are worn by Scouts and Scouters representing unit membership, activities, accomplishments, honors and training. Cub Scouts, Scouts BSA, Venturing and Sea Scouts each have their own specific insignia but all follow similar patterns. The below examples on the right show Boy Scouts and Venturing. The Boy Scouts of America have published a Guide to Awards and Insignia (publication number 33066) which details the specifics of all the awards and insignia. Below are some of the rules set in this guide.

=== Left sleeve ===
Left sleeve

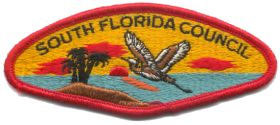
South Florida CSP

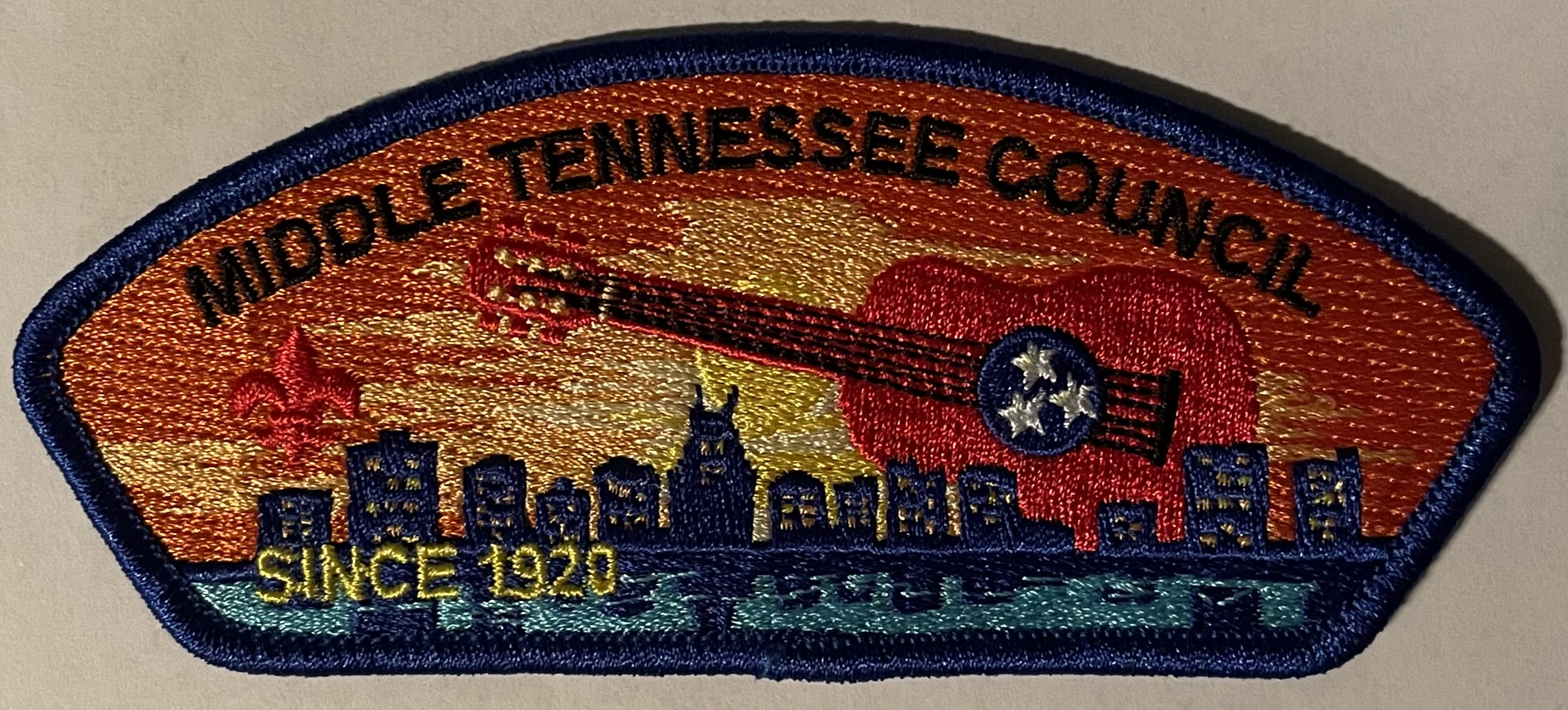
Mid Tennessee CSP

The council shoulder patch (known as the CSP) is an arc-shaped patch worn at the top of the sleeve that identifies the local council. Each council has an official shoulder patch as a default. This patch is the one found at official Scout Stores and well as on the Boy Scouts of America online store. It follows a strict style guide outlined in the Guide to Awards and Insignia (Number 33066) under the section titled Council Shoulder Patch. The patch must feature the full council name (no abbreviations, city or state can be substituted) and must be of one of four shapes shown in the guide. Each council patch celebrates a local feature of the area where the council is located such as famous local landmarks, local fauna or flora, etc. It always features the Scouting Fleur-de-lis or the Boy Scouts of America logo.

Each council is given permission to create their own custom council shoulder patches. These patches are sold directly by the council through their separate stores (online, at local camps, etc.) and are often offered at Trading Posts. These patches are not sold in the National Scout stores (online and brick-and-mortar) where the standard uniforms are purchased. These local patches can celebrate an event, a local landmark, a local scout camp, scouting historical figures, special funding events, etc. They are sometimes issued as sets that are collectible. They can be worn according to local council governance and policies.

Below the council patch, at the unit level, all members wear a unit number. Units with veteran status may wear a veteran unit bar above the numbers. This unit number can be a single patch usually provided by the unit or a group of number patches if purchased from the Scout Store. Cub Scouts and Venturing wear a red patch with white numbers while Scouts wear a tan patch with green numbers. Sea Scouts wear a black patch with white letters. Lone Cub Scouts and Lone Scouts wear the Lone Scout emblem in place of the unit numeral.

Below the unit number, all members except Cub Scouts wear the badge of office such as Scoutmaster, Patrol Leader, etc. On the new (2008) style official shirt, the badge of office is centered on the pocket, but on the older official uniform shirts, the badge of office is centered and touching the bottom of the unit numeral, or centered 4 inches below the shoulder seam.

When earned for the current position, the Trained Strip can be worn by Scouts, Venturing youth, and Adults Leaders who completed the training for the specific position they occupy. It is centered at the top of the pocket flap on the new style official shirt. On the older official uniform shirts without a pocket, it is centered under the badge of Office. The patch has red letters on tan for Cub Scouts, Venturing Leaders, district and council Leaders. forest green letters on tan are worn by Scout Leaders while black is worn by Sea Scouts and Sea Scout Leaders.

Qualified commissioners may wear the Commissioner Arrowhead Honor in the bottom-most position (or if wearing the first version of the Centennial shirt, immediately below the council shoulder strip in the location where a unit number would be worn). Youth who are serving as a Den Chief may wear a Den Chief cord around the left shoulder and under the shoulder strap instead of the emblem. Den Chiefs who earn the Den Chief Service Award may wear the service award cord in addition to the den chief cord and may continue to wear it for as long as they are a youth.

=== Right sleeve ===
Right sleeve

Official uniforms come with the US flag sewn to the top of the sleeve. The orientation of the flag meets the United States Flag Code. Wearing the flag is optional. Scouts whose religion, tradition, or personal beliefs prevent them from displaying the flag are not required to do so.

Below the flag, Cub Scouts (including Webelos) may wear a gold and blue den number and Boy Scouts and Webelos Scouts (as an option) may wear a patrol emblem. In the next position, Scouts and Scouters may wear the most recent Quality Unit emblem earned by their unit. District or council level Scouters may wear the most recently earned Quality District or Quality Council patch. Venturers may wear the official Venturing emblem or an approved specialty emblem below the flag. Scouts and Scouters at the area or regional level may wear a region emblem below the flag.

Other items that may be worn on the right sleeve include the Musician badge and National Honor Patrol stars. Boy Scouts and Varsity Scouts wearing a long-sleeve shirt may also wear up to six merit badges in two columns of three near the cuff.

Webelos wear the Webelos metal miniature pin with its red, green and gold tails under the optional den patch. It is used to pin adventure pins and track progress. This replaces the belt loops used by Lions, Bobcats, Wolf and Bear and is later replaced by the Merit Badge Sash when crossing over to Scouts.

=== Left pocket ===
Left pocket

All Scouts and Scouters wear the round World Crest over the left pocket. This emblem is found on the uniform of most other Scouting organizations and represents unity with other Scouts around the world. Beginning with January 1, 2010, the Boy Scout 100th Anniversary ring may be worn on the outside of the World Crest.

Square knots (see section below) are worn above the left pocket.

The space on the left pocket itself is reserved to indicate Scout rank. Cub Scouts wear the rank badges in a diamond pattern:

- Bobcat at the top
- Wolf at the left
- Bear at the right
- Tiger at the bottom
- Lion goes underneath the pocket

Webelos Scouts wear the oval rank badge when earned. Scouts who have earned the Arrow of Light badge wear it centered below the pocket. Boy Scouts wear their current rank badge centered on the left pocket. Male Venturers may also wear their current Boy Scout rank cloth badge on the official Venturing uniform shirt to age 18.

Scouts and Scouters may wear up to five pin-on medals that they have earned or have been awarded centered just above the pocket seam; medals are usually only worn on formal occasions. Many medals may also be represented by a square knot insignia.

Scouters that have completed the Powder Horn course wear their silver metallic emblem suspended from the left pocket button.

Service stars may be worn above the pocket or top row of square knots. These are star shaped pins with an enameled number representing tenure in each Scouting division. Circular plastic backings represent each membership division: gold is used for Cub Scouting, green is used for Boy Scouting, brown used is for Varsity Scouting, red is used for Venturing and blue indicates adult service. Scouts and leaders with tenure as Tiger Cubs prior to 2000 may wear a service star with an orange backing. Those who served in Exploring prior to 1998 may wear a service star with red backing.

=== Right pocket ===
Right pocket

The space on the right pocket is reserved for one temporary insignia, such as patches from summer camps or other activities, which should be centered on the pocket. Only one such item is worn centered on the pocket. Members of the Order of the Arrow may wear lodge insignia on the flap of the right pocket.

Official uniforms have a BSA strip immediately above the right pocket, with the adult uniforms and youth male uniforms displaying the text "Boy Scouts of America", and the youth female uniforms displaying a fleur-de-lis logo and the text "BSA" in larger typeface. There are several insignia that can be placed above the BSA strip, including interpreter strips indicating foreign languages spoken. Boy Scouts over the age of 14 in a troop's Venture patrol may wear the corresponding strip above the interpreter strip. If worn, a name tag may be placed just above the BSA program strip, interpreter and Venture strips (if worn) or on the flap of the right pocket if no lodge insignia is used. Scouts or Scouters that have participated or have been selected to attend a National or World Jamboree may wear the corresponding patch centered between the right pocket and the shoulder seam. Order of the Arrow members selected to attend the Centennial Order of the Arrow National Conference in 2015 may wear the official Conference emblem in this location as an exception.

Visitors to all such events may wear patches for those events as a temporary insignia, centered on the right pocket.

Female Cub Scout leaders may wear the temporary insignia centered between the BSA strip and the shoulder seam.

=== Merit badge sash ===
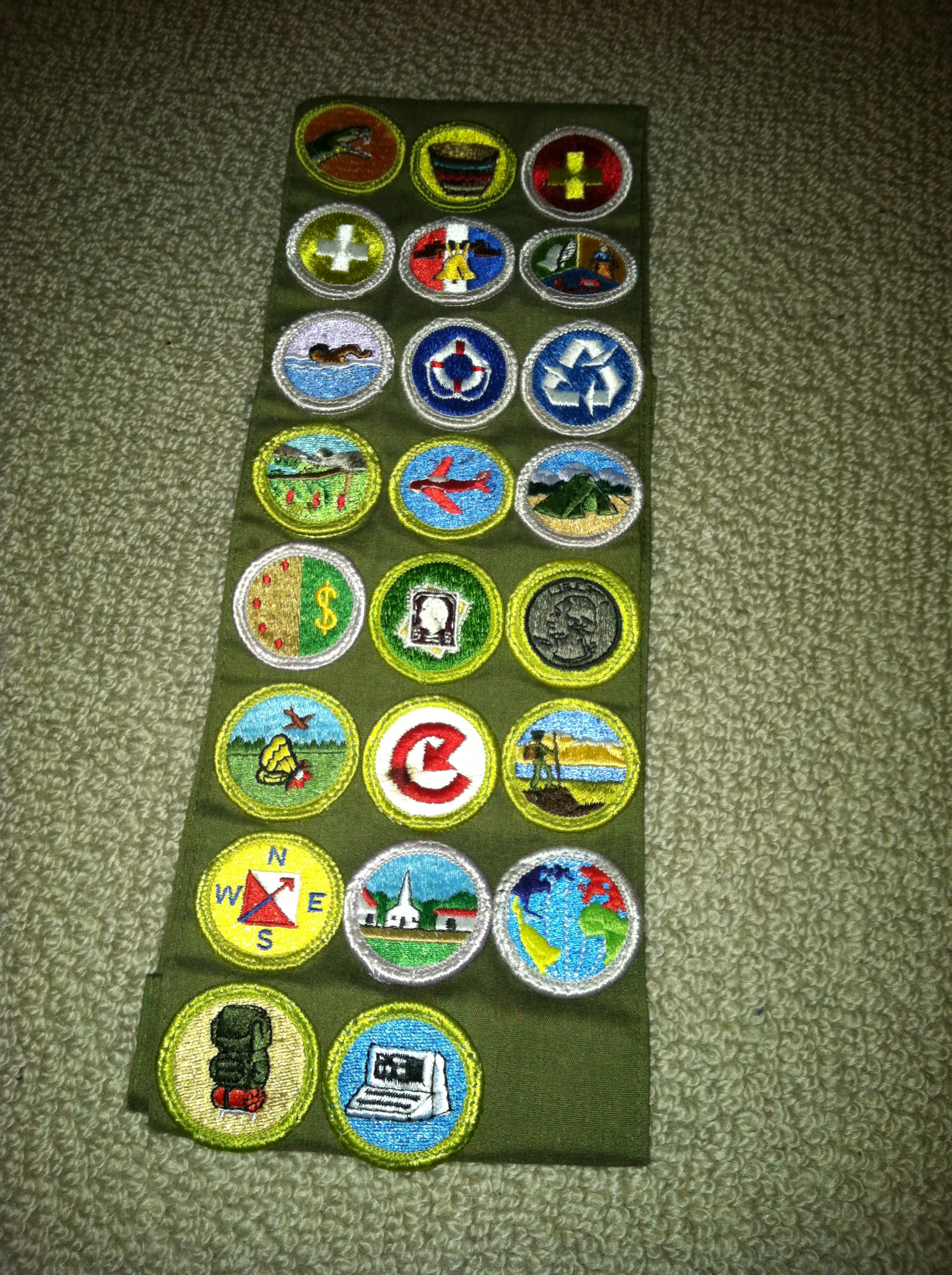
Merit badge sash

Boy Scouts and Varsity Scouts may wear the merit badge sash, generally on formal occasions. Merit badges may be worn on the front of the sash and the Varsity Letter with earned pins and bars may be worn on the bottom front corner. Additional merit badges and temporary insignia may be worn on the back of the sash. The sash is worn over the right shoulder and should never be worn folded through the belt, and should not be worn at the same time as the Order of the Arrow sash.

=== Shoulder loops ===
The yellow, tan and dark green shirts have shoulder straps (often referred to as epaulets) and colored shoulder loops (often called tabs) are worn on the straps to indicate the program level.

- Webelos and all Cub Scout Leaders wear blue loops
- Boy Scouts and leaders wear olive green loops (changed from red in 2008),
- Varsity Scouts and leaders wear blaze (orange) loops
- Venturers and leaders wear emerald green loops.
- Adults or youth who hold a district, council, or section position wear silver loops
- Adults or youth who hold area, regional, or national positions wear gold loops.

Blue, red, forest green or blaze loops may not be worn on the green Venturing shirt and emerald green loops may not be worn on the tan shirt. Custom loops are not authorized.

=== Square knot insignia ===
==== Square knots ====
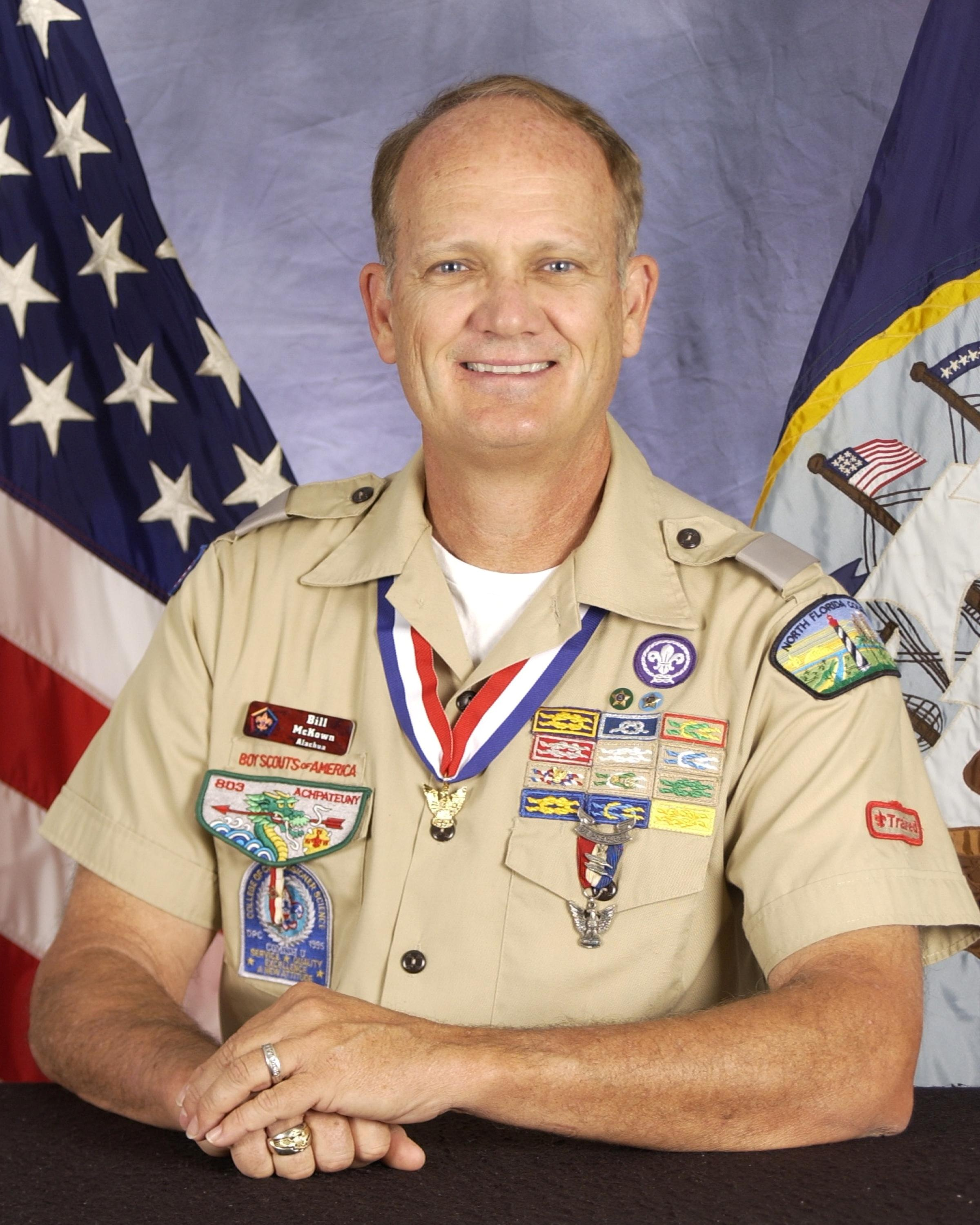
Retired US Navy captain Bill McKown wearing his Boy Scouts of America leader's uniform with twelve square knots instead of the maximum nine allowed

Youth Religious Emblem Knot

Eagle Scout Knot

Arrow of Light Knot

Medals and the like are not generally worn on the uniform for everyday use; instead, square knot insignia are worn to represent some national and local council awards and scout achievements. These insignia pieces are small cloth patches with an embroidered square knot or other emblem that represents the actual award. The colors of the knot, the patch background and the patch border indicate the represented award. For the most part, the colors of the knot emblem are taken from the ribbon or design of the actual award. The knot is not the award, but rather an optional representation and recognition that the individual has received or earned a specific award. Knots can be worn by all members of Boy Scouts of America if they have received the awards.

The Religious Emblem (purple patch with a silver knot) can be earned as a Cub Scout and transferred to the Scout uniform when it crosses over and can be worn by adults who received it as a child.

No more than nine knots can be worn at any given time in three rows of three and they must not be flipped upside down. However, this is not enforced. Sea Scouts have different rules such as no more than six knots at the time.

==== Palms ====
Eagle Scouts can earn palms that can be worn on the Eagle Scout knot. Various requirements can earn an Eagle Scout Palms and the program is evolving. Eagle Scouts can earn Palms if they go beyond the required Merit Badges at the time of the award (21 in 2023). Palms are available in Bronze, Silver and Gold for the number patches earned beyond the required number:

- Bronze Palm: 5 extra Merit Badges
- Gold Palm: 10 extra Merit Badges
- Silver Palm: 15 extra Merit Badges

Palms are combined to represent the number earned beyond the required number.

Palms are also available on some other knots such as the Honor Medal With Crossed Palms which recognizes a Scout's heroic actions that involve extreme risk to self

==== Other "knots" ====
Although they do not use a square knot insignia, there are three other awards that are considered "Square Knots".

- District Award of Merit: an overhand knot
- Silver World Award: white and red strips with a circle in the middle with three white stars on blue
- Seabadge: Blue trident on a grey background

=== Wood Badge ===
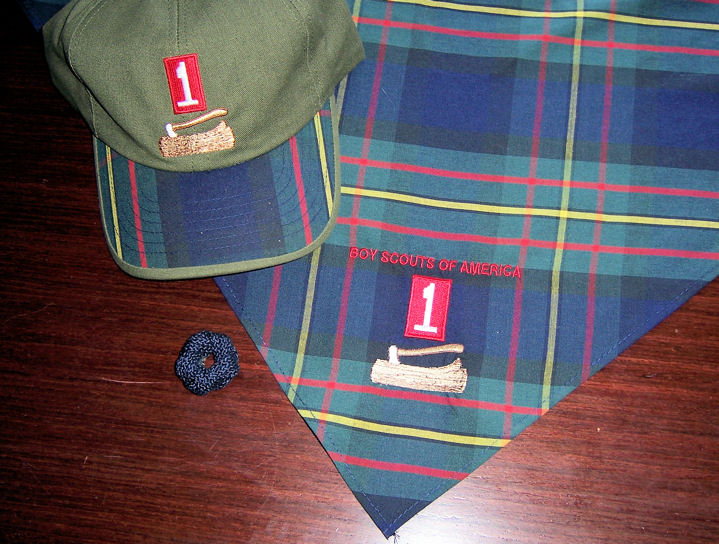
Wood Badge training hat and neckerchief

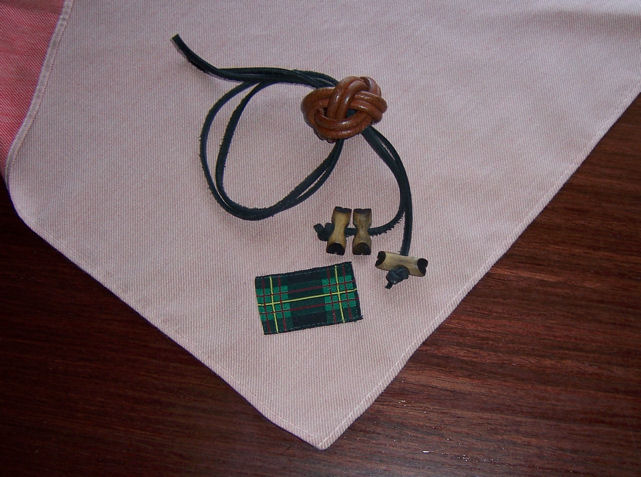
Wood Badge beads, neckerchief and woggle

During the Wood Badge course Scouters, both staff and participants, wear the uniform of their unit and membership division; this is a change from the older custom where the uniform was worn without insignia other than the council shoulder patch and the Troop 1 numeral. The uniform is worn with the Wood Badge training hat, the neckerchief and with a woggle made during the opening sessions of the course. The hat and neckerchief use the Troop 1 numeral to represent the first troop to use the Wood Badge program. The axe-in-log is the emblem of Gilwell Park where the first Wood Badge course was held and the Maclaren tartan honors William de Bois Maclaren, who donated the funding to purchase Gilwell Park in 1919. After completing Wood Badge, the beads, neckerchief and woggle are presented and worn.

=== Non-uniform insignia ===
A number of emblems are awarded that are not intended for wear on the uniform. The emblems for aquatics qualifications are intended for wear on the left side of swimwear for:

- Boardsailing BSA
- Kayaking BSA
- Mile Swim BSA
- Scuba BSA
- Snorkeling BSA

Certification such as BSA Lifeguard and BSA Aquatics Instructor are worn on the right side of the swimwear.

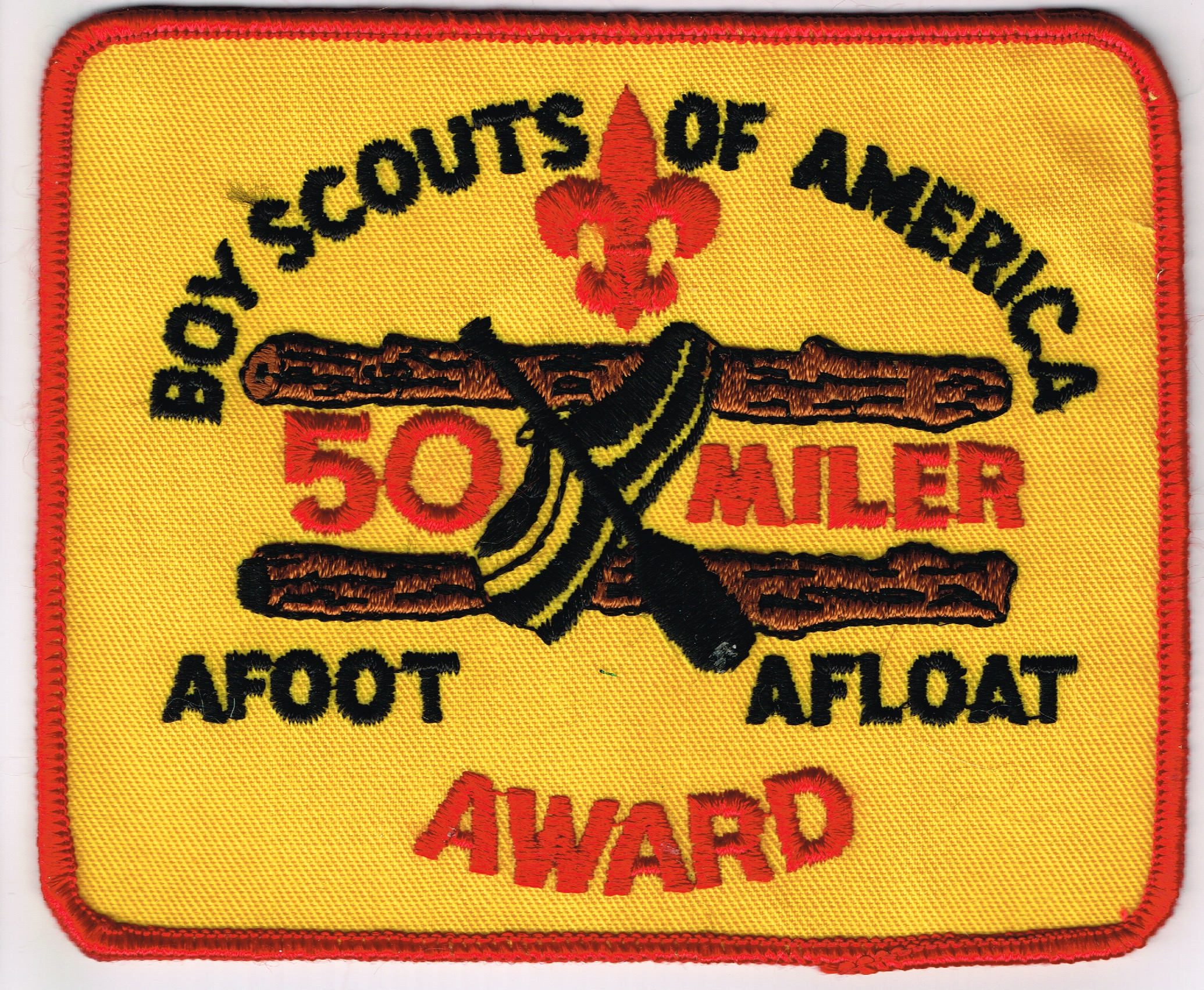
BSA 50 Miler Award

Other awards are intended as equipment decoration such as a backpack or on a blanket. These include:

- the 50-Miler Award
- Historic Trails Award
- Paul Bunyan Woodsman
- the Totin' Chip
- Firem'n Chit

=== Spoof insignia ===
Non-official patches, badges, emblems, shoulder loops and other insignia are readily available from third-party suppliers. These spoofs are parodies of existing emblems. For example, spoof versions of the "Trained" emblem include Over Trained, Potty Trained and Untrainable. Common spoof interpreter strips include English, Klingon, Brooklyneese and Southern Drawl, and spoof epaulets include a red, white and blue one for Eagle Scouts and a tiger paw for Tiger Cubs. Though not truly spoofs, another very common variant of actual BSA insignia are square knot emblems with spruce green, navy blue, or black backgrounds to match the Venturing and Sea Scout uniforms as opposed to the tan twill used by BSA National, which only matches the Scouts BSA uniform.

== Flags ==
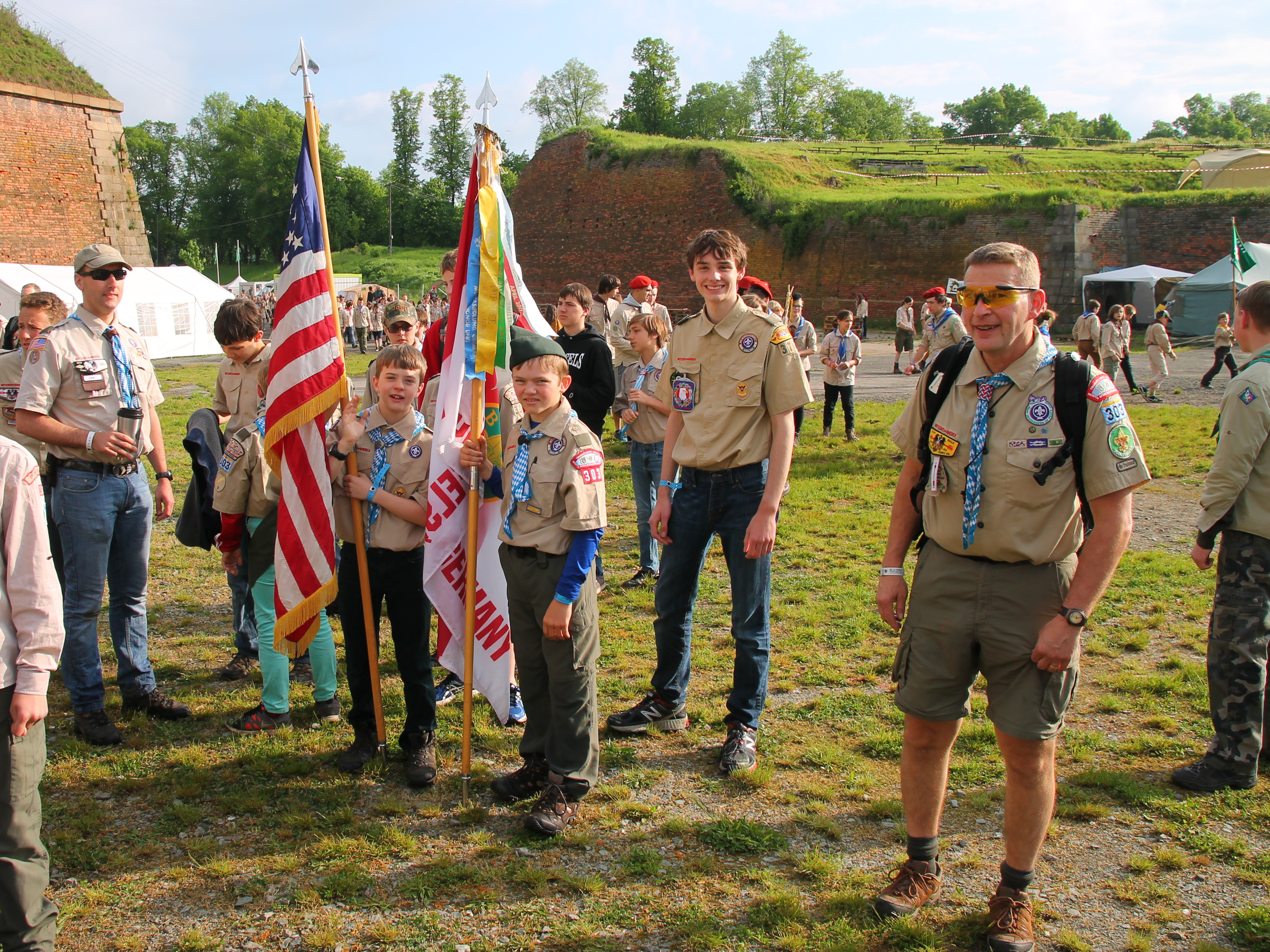
Transatlantic Council Troop 303 holding their American flag and troop flag at Intercamp 2016 in the Czech Republic.

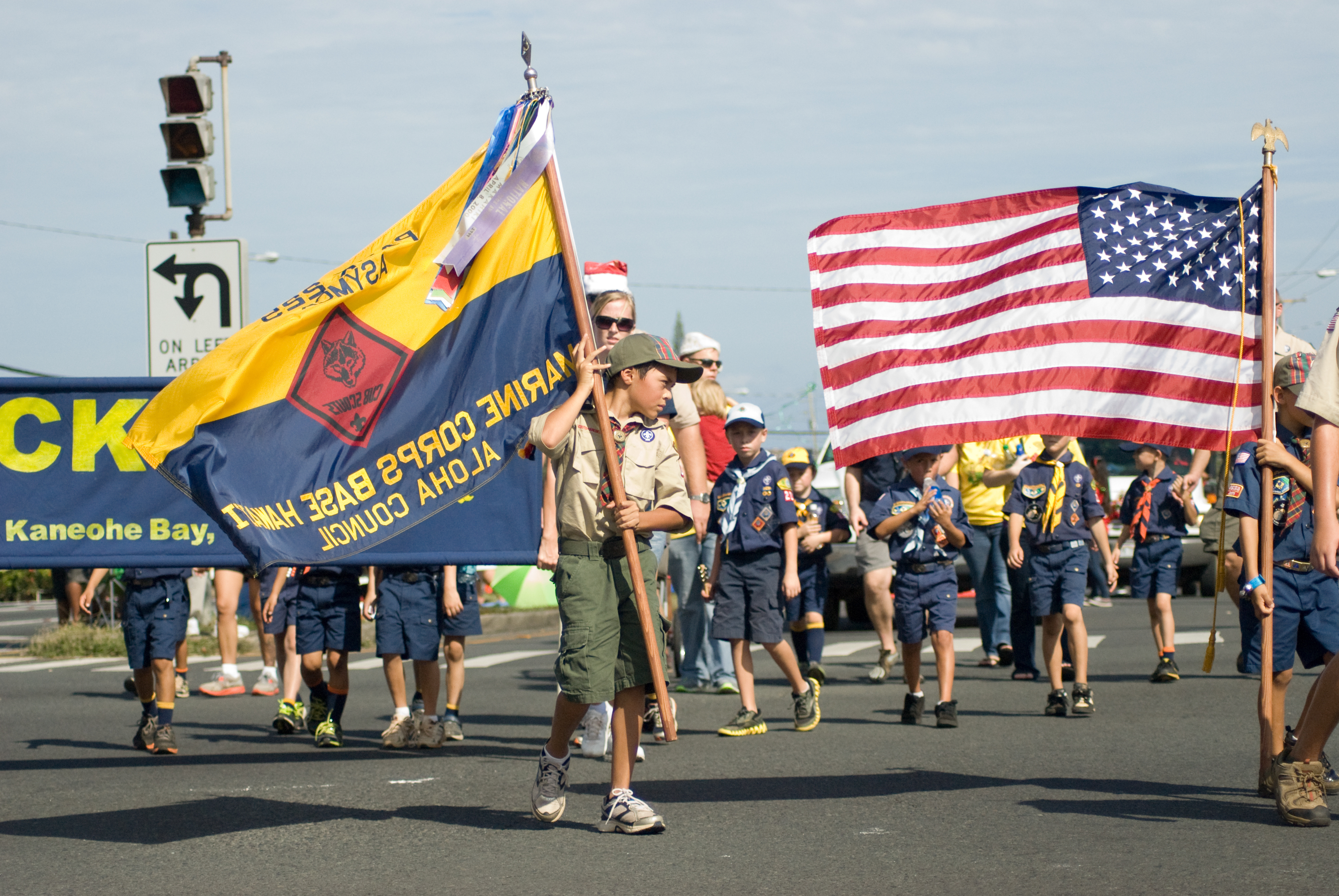
Cub Scouts in Hawaii during a Christmas parade in 2012

While not technically part of the uniform, the Unit flag plays an important part in the Boy Scouts of America. Along with the American flag and the state flag, it is used at every flag ceremony.

The unit is specific to each unit but follows a specific standard. Flags are split with a top half in one color and the bottom in another and the program emblem in the center. The upper half has lettering for the unit type and number and the chartering organization; the bottom has lettering for the community and council.

- Cub Scout: gold top half with blue lettering and blue bottom half with gold lettering
- Scout: red with white lettering over white with red lettering
- Varsity: orange over white with yellow lettering on both halves
- Venturing: white over gold with green lettering
- Sea Scout: red over blue with white lettering.

Within the Cub Scout pack:

- Den flag: gold on dark blue background. Den numbers are sold in pairs (0 to 9) and combined to be added to the flag.
- Webelos den flag: Light blue and gold on dark blue background. Den numbers are sold as for the den flags.
- Tiger flag: orange flag with the Tiger emblem

Other flags include:

- Local councils: Dark blue with gold lettering and the Boy Scout emblem. Name of the council in the upper half, headquarters city and state in lower half
- Districts: Dark blue with gold lettering and the Boy Scout emblem. Name or number of the district on upper half, name of local council on lower half. Headquarters city and state are optional
- Council camps: Dark blue with gold lettering indicating the name of the camp and council

== Other terminology ==
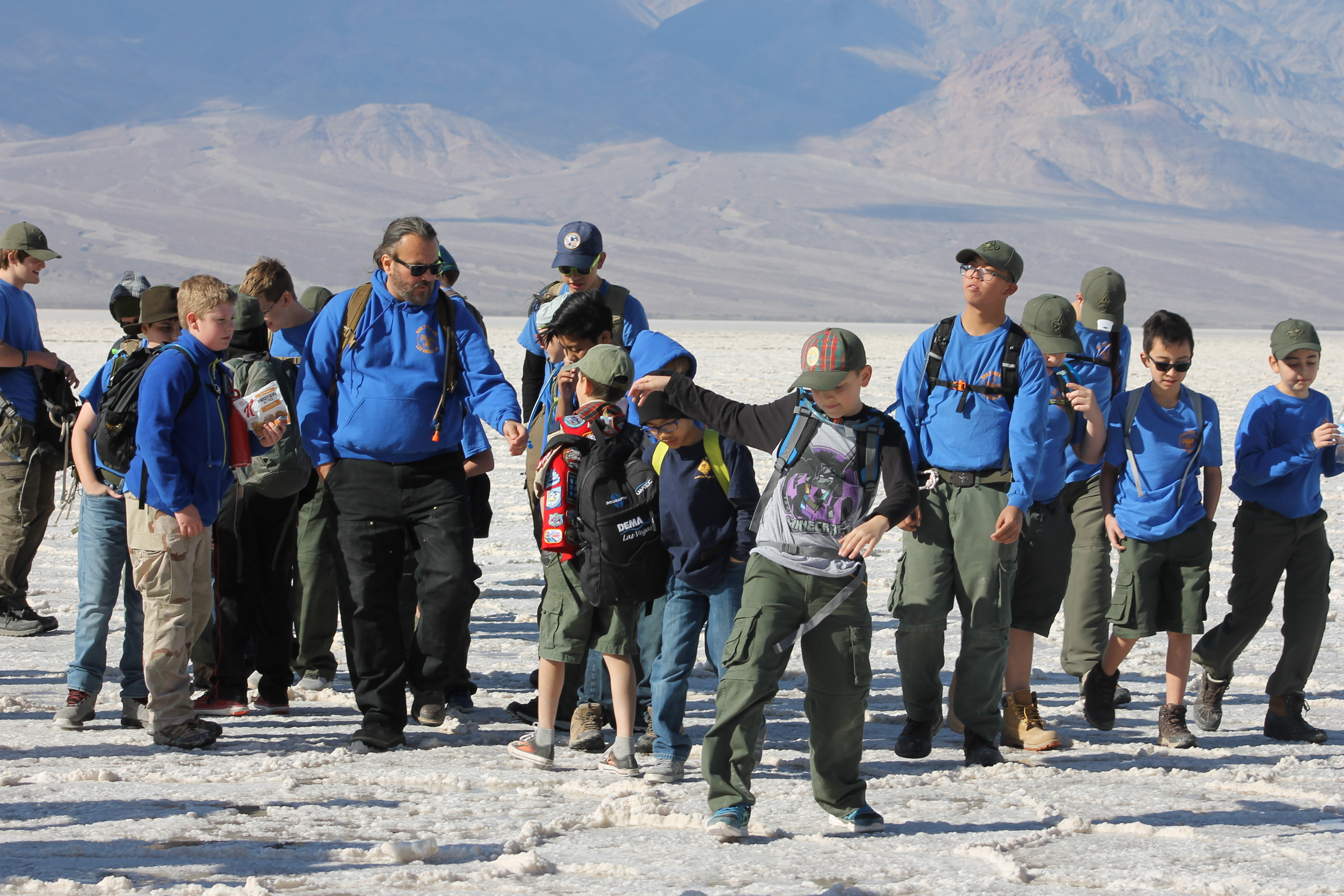
Scouts and Leaders in activity uniforms

Properly, the uniform is referred to as the official field uniform. An activity or utility uniform generally consists of a Scouting related T-shirt, polo shirt or other shirt, often customized with a unit design. Activity or utility uniforms are worn when the official field uniform is not appropriate for activities or as directed by the unit leaders.

Members sometimes casually refer to these classifications as class A and class B, respectively. Such terminology is not used in any official publications, where the terms "field uniform" and "activity uniform" are used.

== See also ==
- Ranks in Scouts BSA
- Cub Scouting (Boy Scouts of America)
- Venturing
- Sea Scouts (Boy Scouts of America)
- History of the Boy Scouts of America
