= Cub Scouts (Scouting America) =

Coed program of Scouting America for kids in grades K-5

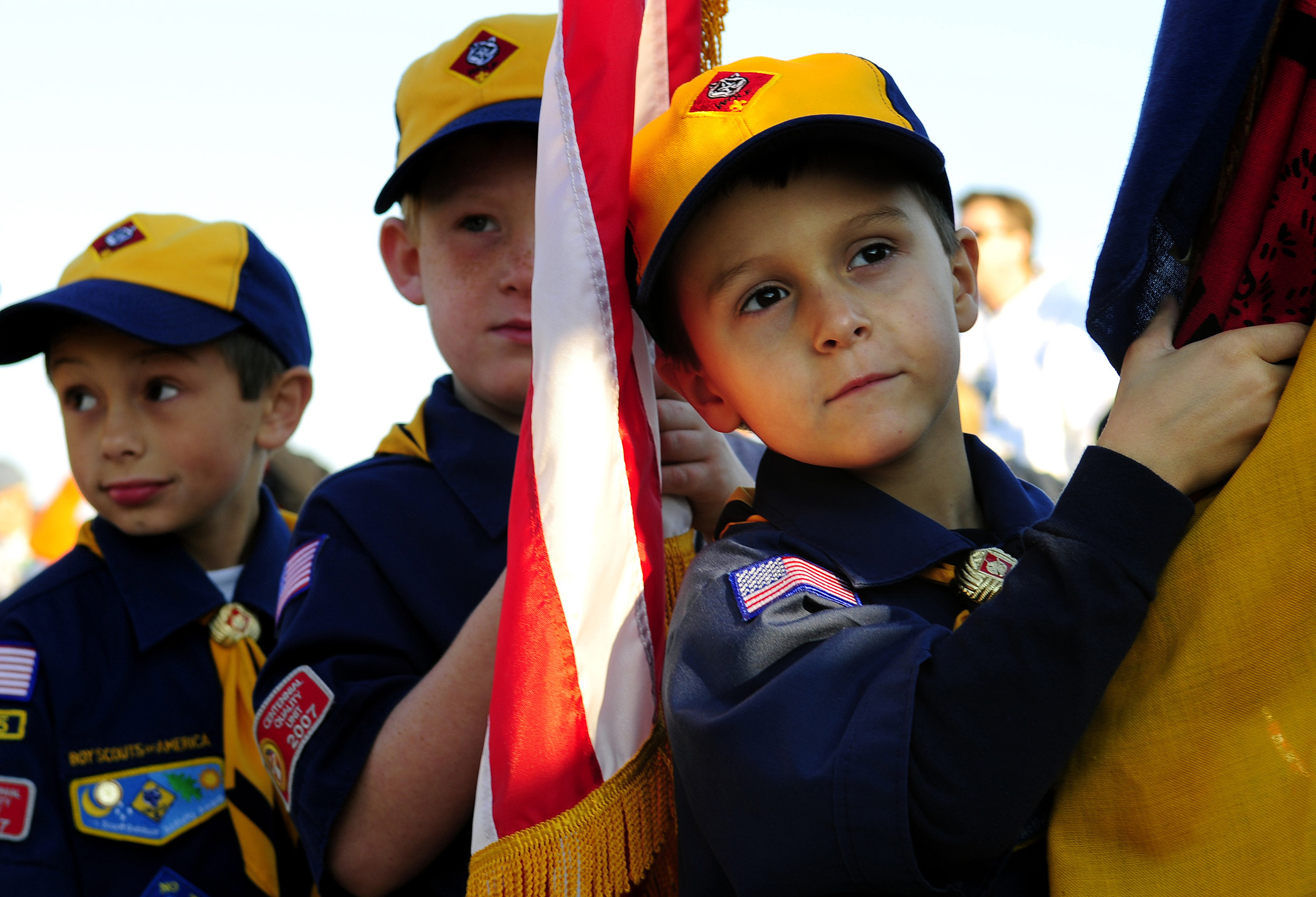
- Wolf Cubs in Virginia (red color being phased in for hat and neckerchief) (2008)
- Owner: Scouting America
- Age range: Kindergarten to fifth grade
- Country: United States
- Founded: 1930; 96 years ago
- Membership: 589,253 youth (2025); 16,295 packs (2023)
	Next; Scouts BSA
- Website www.scouting.org/programs/cub-scouts/
- Standard uniform colors for Cub Scouts (excluding Arrow of Light scouts)

Cub Scouts is a Scouting America program available to children from kindergarten through fifth grade and their families. Its membership is the largest of the five main Scouting America divisions (Cub Scouting, Scouts BSA, Venturing, Exploring and Sea Scouting). Cub Scouts is part of the worldwide Scouting movement and aims to promote character development, citizenship training, personal fitness, and leadership. Cub Scouts are organized into local packs where they complete requirements to advance in rank as well as engage in pack events such as the Pinewood Derby.

== Origins ==
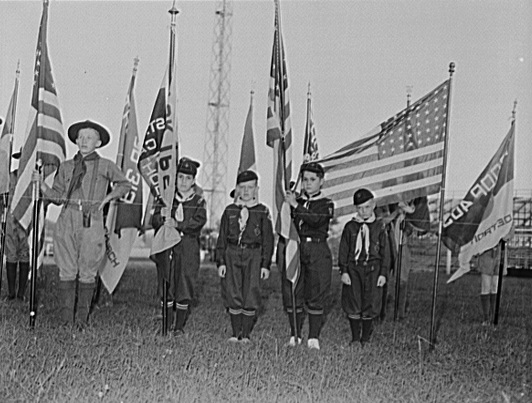
Detroit, Michigan. Cub Scouts with flag standards at the British Blitz Scout meeting, 1942

As early as 1911, Ernest Thompson Seton had developed a prototype program he named Cub Scouts of America that was never implemented. James E. West felt that having BSA divisions for younger boys (those under 12; the "younger boy problem") would draw away boys from the core program, which was Scout troops focused on the 12- to 17-year-old age group; thus he opposed such a program for some time. In spite of this, unofficial programs for younger boys started around this time, under names such as Junior Troops or Cadet Corps. The BSA obtained the rights to Lord Baden-Powell's The Wolf Cub's Handbook in 1916 and used it in unofficial Wolf Cub programs starting in 1918. This led to an issue with Daniel Carter Beard who felt that the use of the British book was nearly disloyal to the United States of America. West encouraged the formation of the Boy Rangers of America, a separate organization for boys eight through twelve based on an American Indian theme. The Boy Rangers used the Scout Law and their Chief Guide, Emerson Brooks, was a Boy Scout commissioner in Montclair, New Jersey. The BSA finally began some experimental Cub units in 1928 and in 1930 the BSA began registering the first Cub Scout packs, and the Boy Rangers were absorbed.

The British Cubbing program used elements of Rudyard Kipling's Jungle Book series, with the Cubmaster taking the role of Akela and the assistant Cubmaster the role of Baloo. The American program also syncretized American Indian elements, with all Cub Scouts belonging to the Webelos tribe, symbolized by the Arrow of Light and led by Akela. Webelos was also a portmanteau meaning Wolf, Bear, Lion, Scout; the name was later given a backronym of "WE'll BE LOyal Scouts". The initial rank structure was Wolf, Bear and Lion, with ages of 9, 10 and 11. Dens of six to eight Cubs were entirely led by a Scout holding the position of den chief.

== Aims, methods, and purposes ==
The Aims of Cub Scouting are the same as the other divisions—character, citizenship, personal fitness, and leadership.

The Methods of Cub Scouting

1. Living the Ideals
2. Belonging to a Den
3. Advancement
4. Family Involvement
5. Activities
6. Serving the Neighborhood
7. Blue Uniform
8. Working for badges

The Purposes of Cub Scouting are

1. Character Development
2. Spiritual Growth
3. Good Citizenship
4. Sportsmanship and Fitness
5. Family Understanding
6. Respectful Relationships
7. Personal Achievement
8. Friendly Service
9. Fun and Adventure
10. Preparation for Scouts

== Ideals ==
On June 1, 2015, the Cub Scout Promise and the Law of the Pack were retired and replaced by the Scout Oath and Scout Law. The Cub Scout Motto continues to be used.

Scout Oath

On my honor I will do my best
To do my duty to God and my country
and to obey the Scout Law;
To help other people at all times;
To keep myself physically strong
mentally awake, and morally straight.

Scout Law

A Scout is trustworthy, loyal, helpful, friendly, courteous, kind, obedient, cheerful, thrifty, brave, clean, and reverent.

Cub Scout Motto

Do Your Best

The Cub Scout sign, two raised fingers of the right hand, identifies the youth as a Cub Scout and the two fingers stand for the Scout Oath and Law. The Cub Scout salute, two fingers of the right hand raised to the edge of the cap or eyebrow, is used to show respect for the country when saluting the flag of the United States. The Cub Scout handshake, first two fingers along the inside of the other Scout's wrist, is used to help each other remember and obey the Scout Oath and Law.

== Organization ==
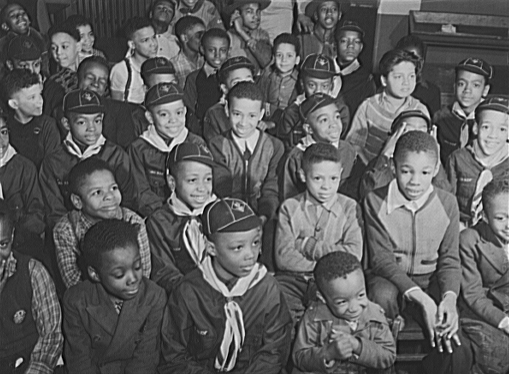
A meeting of the Cub Scouts at the Ida B. Wells Housing Project, Chicago (1942)

The Cub Scout pack is sponsored by a community organization such as a business, service organization, school, labor group or religious institution. The chartered organization is responsible for selecting leadership, providing a meeting place and promoting a good program. The chartered organization representative is the liaison between the pack, the chartered organization, and the BSA.

The pack meets once a month, providing a program for Cub Scouts, leaders, parents and other family members attending. The pack is led by a Cubmaster with one or more assistant Cubmasters. The pack committee is a group of adults, led by the pack committee chair, who plan the pack program and activities and manage record keeping, finance, leadership recruitment and registration. The pack trainer is responsible for ensuring that all of the pack leaders are trained and for maintaining training records.

Cub Scouts who join a pack are assigned to dens with ideally six to eight members, usually based on age: Lion Scouts (kindergarten), Tiger Scouts (first grade), Wolf Scouts (second grade), Bear Scouts (third grade), Webelos Scouts (fourth grade), and Arrow of Light Scouts (fifth grade). Dens meet weekly or biweekly under the direction of the adult den leader. A Cub Scout is elected to the Denner position to provide basic leadership to the den. A Scout or Venturer holding the den chief position may assist the den leader in activities. Den meetings are planned around a particular adventure being worked on for rank advancement and may include games, handicrafts, hikes and other outdoor fun while also preparing for the next pack meeting.

Webelos is an acronym meaning "We'll Be Loyal Scouts". According to the Bear Cub Scout Book of 1954, the name originally came from the initial letters of "wolf, bear, lion, Scout", the rank of "Lion Cub Scout" was dropped in 1967, however was used again in 2017 with the launch of the pilot kindergarten program of the same name which became a full-fledged part of the program in 2018. AOL dens spend much of their time learning about Scout customs, including the Scout Law and Oath. Many packs are formally associated with a Scout troop for mutual support—the troop provides assistance to the pack with activities such as campouts and ceremonies and in time, the AOL Scouts cross over to the troop.

The Lone Cub Scout program serves youth who cannot take part in a nearby Cub Scout pack on a regular basis because of such factors as distance, weather, time, disability or similar issues.

In October 2017, Scouting America announced that girls would be welcomed into the Cub Scout program in single gender dens but co-ed packs. 77,000 girls joined nationwide creating packs in California, among other places.

In April 2023, Scouting America announced that effective June 1, 2023, co-ed dens (aka family dens) would now be allowed for Cub Scouts in Kindergarten through 4th Grade (Lions through Webelos). AOL dens for 5th graders would remain single-gender dens in order to prepare them for single-gender patrols within Scouts BSA troops.

== Uniform ==
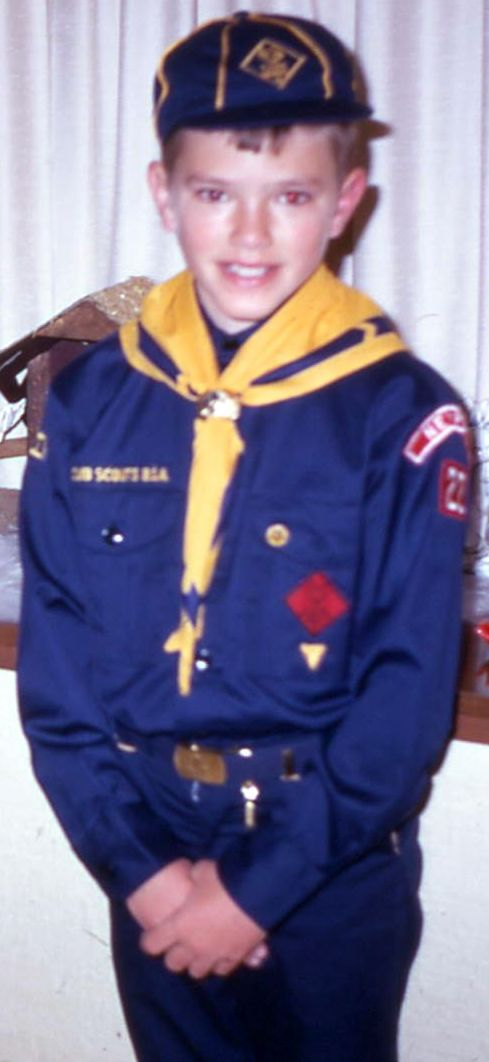
Cub Scout in uniform, 1968

The uniform gives a Cub Scout visibility and creates a level of identity within both the unit and the community. The neckerchief, the neckerchief slide and the belt buckle uniforms are similar in basic design, they do vary in color and detail to identify the different divisions of Cub Scouts, Scouts and Venturers. In all cases, shirts are tucked in.

=== Youth uniforms ===
Lions have the option of two uniforms to wear; each Lion den will separately decide which uniform they as a den will wear.

- Option A is the Cub Scout uniform, accompanied by a yellow Lion neckerchief and Lion slide, the blue Cub Scout belt, a blue cap with lion logo, and blue socks topped with yellow. Scouts can wear blue pants, blue shorts, or blue skorts, as appropriate.
- Option B is the official Lion t-shirt which has the lion logo on it, but without the neckerchief or slide. The t-shirt can also be accompanied by the same hat, belt, socks, and pants, shorts, or skorts.

Tigers wear the Cub Scout uniform, accompanied by yellow-topped blue socks, an orange neckerchief, neckerchief slide with the Tiger logo, the cap with an orange panel and Tiger emblem and the blue Cub Scout belt. Scouts can wear blue pants, blue shorts, or blue skorts, as appropriate.

Wolves wear the Cub Scout uniform and the Wolf cap with red panel and Wolf logo and the red Wolf neckerchief and the neckerchief slide with Wolf logo. The yellow Wolf cap and yellow neckerchiefs are no longer sold at most council shops, but are still allowed to be worn instead of the red. Wolves also wear the Cub Scout belt and blue socks topped with a ring of yellow. Scouts can wear blue pants, blue shorts, or blue skorts, as appropriate.

Bears wear the Cub Scout uniform and a cap with light blue panel with Bear logo. The light blue neckerchief and the neckerchief slide have the Bear logo. Bears also wear the Cub Scout belt and blue socks topped with a ring of yellow. Scouts can wear blue pants, blue shorts, or blue skorts, as appropriate.

Webelos typically wear the Cub Scout uniform, with one unique addition being the Adventure colors ribbons worn on the right sleeve to hold the pins they earn. The Webelos cap is green with a plaid panel and the oval Webelos emblem; the plaid is made up of the Cub Scouting blue and gold and the Scouts BSA red and green. The neckerchief is plaid with the Webelos logo and is worn with the slide with Webelos emblem. Webelos also wear the Cub Scout belt and blue socks topped with a ring of yellow. Scouts can wear blue pants, blue shorts, or blue skorts, as appropriate. Starting in 4th grade, parents are given discretion as to when to have their Scout begin wearing the Scouts BSA field uniform. If a Webelos Scout has outgrown their blue uniform, it is appropriate for them to acquire and wear a tan Scouts BSA uniform instead rather than acquiring a new blue Cub Scout uniform for just a short window of time.

Arrow of Light Scouts wear the Scouts BSA field uniform with blue shoulder loops. The AOL Scouts no longer wear the Webelos cap or neckerchief; AOL Dens can choose to either go without both or can wear the Scouts BSA hat and neckerchief. AOL Scouts wear the green Scouts BSA belt and green Scouts BSA socks. The AOL den may elect to wear a den emblem in place of the den number; the patches are the same as the Scout patrol patches.

=== Scouter uniforms ===
Adult leaders wear the basic Scout field uniform. Female leaders of dens below Webelos level have the option of the classic female Cub Scouter uniform with blue web belt. Leaders that wear the tan uniform shirt wear blue shoulder loops on the epaulets, Centennial or Switchbacks pants or shorts, and the Scout web or leather belt. They may wear the Cub Scout Leader neckerchief or any official BSA neckerchief, with the appropriate neckerchief slide or woggle. Leaders may wear any official BSA adult hat.

The Scouter dress uniform is appropriate for professional Scouters and all Scouting leaders on formal occasions.

== Advancement and recognition ==
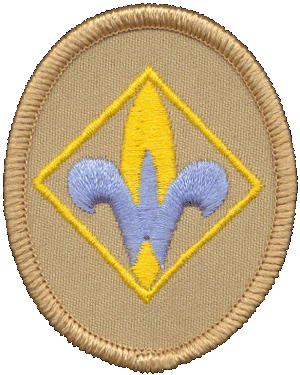
Webelos Scout Badge

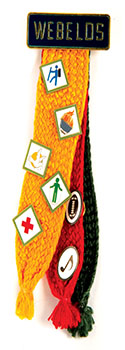
Webelos Scout Colors and Adventure Pins

Arrow of Light
emblem (youth)
and knot (adult)

Advancement is one of the methods used to promote the aims of character development, citizenship training, personal fitness, and leadership. Everything a Cub Scout does in the advancement program is intended to achieve these aims and aid in personal growth. On June 1, 2015, Cub Scouting changed the advancement system to an "adventure" system, including required and elective adventures for all ranks. Lion, Tiger, Wolf, and Bear Cubs earn activity belt loops for each completed adventure, while Webelos and Arrow of Light scouts, earn activity pins which can be worn on the cap or on the Webelos colors.

On June 1, 2024, Cub Scouts reworked all of the ranks to harmonize and simplify the adventure system. Each rank now has six required adventures and requires the additional completion of two elective adventures. Lion and Arrow of Light have 16 elective adventures to choose from and Tiger, Wolf, Bear, and Webelos all have 20 electives.

Bobcat is no longer a rank that is earned when a Cub Scout first joins, but rather is the first required adventure that should be completed as part of each rank.

=== Lion badge ===
Kindergartners work toward the Lion badge. The Lion badge is earned by completing six required adventures and two elective adventures. Outside of the requirements, Lion Scouts can also complete any number of sixteen elective adventures of their den's or family's choosing. The Lion badge is the most recent addition to Cub Scouts as it was introduced in 2018.

=== Tiger, Wolf, Bear, and Webelos badges ===
Cub Scouts in first grade work toward the Tiger badge, while those in second grade work toward the Wolf badge, those in third grade work toward the Bear badge, and those in fourth grade work toward the Webelos badge. Cub Scouts at all four levels must complete six required adventures and two of 20 elective adventures with their den or family, as well as completing age-specific exercises to help prevent child abuse with their family. The abuse prevention requirements must be completed annually. The remaining elective adventures may be completed throughout the rest of the school year.

=== Arrow of Light badge ===
The Arrow of Light badge is the highest rank award available to Cub Scouts. To earn the Arrow of Light, the Cub Scout must complete six required adventures, two of 16 elective adventures, and child abuse prevention exercises. Earning the Arrow of Light allows a youth to join a Scout troop at ten years of age instead of eleven. The adventure curriculum for AOL Scouts is shorter than that of Webelos Scouts in order to accommodate the fact that AOL Scouts will traditionally bridge to a Scouts BSA troop between January and March of their fifth grade school year. The requirements for the Arrow of Light badge prepare the AOL Scouts for Scouts BSA without significantly repeating the requirements for the first rank in Scouts BSA, Scout. The AOL handbook also includes pages from the Scouts BSA handbook for the Scout rank so that families do not have to purchase two handbooks in the same year.

The Arrow of Light award is one of the few Cub Scout awards that can be worn on a Scout uniform.^{[A]} Both Cub Scouts and Scouts wear the Arrow of Light badge below the left pocket. Adults wear the square-knot version of the badge above the left pocket.

=== Religious emblems ===
Several religious emblems programs are administered by various religious institutions and recognized, but not sponsored, by Scouting America. These are generally recognized by a medal and an embroidered square knot that can also be worn on the Scouting uniform.

=== Leader recognition ===
Cub Scout leaders who complete training, tenure, and performance requirements are recognized by a system of awards. The Den Leader Award, the Scouter's Training Award, and the Cubmaster's Training Key are available. These awards were standardized to more closely align with Scouts BSA's other programs in 2012, removing most of the distinctive Cub Scout level awards such as Tiger Cub Den Leader's Training Award (discontinued December 2012), the Webelos Den Leader's Training Award (discontinued December 2012), the Cubmaster's Training Award (discontinued December 2013), the Cub Scouter's Training Award (discontinued December 2013), and the Pack Trainer Award (discontinued December 2013). The Scouter's Training Award replaced the Cub Scouter Award, and the Cubmaster's Training Key replaced the Cubmaster's Training Award. The Pack Trainer Award had previously replaced the Den Leader Coach Award, which was officially discontinued on December 31, 2008. Any awards earned prior to the date of their retirement can still be worn. These awards are recognized by a certificate, medal, and an embroidered square knot insignia.^{[B]} Den Chiefs may earn the Den Chief Service Award.

== Program and activities ==
Each pack has a number of annual events such as the pinewood derby, raingutter regatta, the space derby, gold rush, the blue and gold banquet and Scout Sunday or Scout Sabbath.

Several structured camping activities are available in the Cub Scout program. The pack overnighter is a pack-organized camping activity that provides Cub Scouts with positive outdoor experiences. Cub Scout day camp or twilight camp is an accredited, organized, one- to five-day program for Cub Scouts using trained leadership at an approved site, and is usually held during daylight or early evening hours, but not overnight. Cub Scout resident camp is an organized, accredited overnight camping program covering at least two nights and conducted under trained leadership in an established Scout camp operated by the council. The Webelos den overnight camp introduces the Scout and parents to the camping program, under the leadership of the Webelos den leader. Joint campouts with a local Scout troop for second-year Webelos can help to strengthen ties between the pack and troop and facilitate the transition from Webelos to Scouts.

The Soccer and Scouting program is designed to involve Hispanic youth and families in the Cub Scout program, instructing Scouts in both soccer and Cub Scout values.

Alcohol is prohibited at all Cub Scout events. A number of "high-risk" outdoor activities are banned by Scouting America (including Cubs), and others are limited to special programs. Paintball, lasertag, hunting, rodeo, fireworks, and bungee-jumping are among prohibited activities.

== Training ==
Fast Start Training is the introduction for adult leaders new to the Cub Scout program. Fast Start is self-paced and provided as a video or online. Youth Protection Training is required for all adult leaders and must be recertified per local council policy. Basic Leader Training consists of the online This is Scouting course and Leader Specific Training. This is Scouting is a common core program for all adult leaders in the Cub Scouting, Scouts BSA, Varsity Scouting, and Venturing divisions. Leader Specific Training is provided for the Tiger Cub den leader, Cub Scout den leader, Webelos den leader, Cubmaster, pack committee chairman and assistants. Once Basic Leader Training is completed, the leader is awarded a Trained emblem for uniform wear.

At least one adult on a pack overnight campout must attend the Basic Adult Leader Outdoor Orientation (BALOO) in order to properly understand camping requirements. Leaders for day camp and resident camp programs must be trained and certified by the National Camping School.

Supplemental training modules are designed to provide orientation beyond Basic Leader Training. These shorter training sessions are often provided at the Roundtable, a monthly meeting of leaders from the district, at a Pow-Wow or University of Scouting program offered by the local council and at National Cub Scouting Conferences held at the Philmont Scout Ranch and the Florida National High Adventure Sea Base.

Wood Badge is the advanced training program for leadership skills for all adults in all Scouting America programs. Wood Badge consists of six days of training (usually presented as two three-day weekends) and an application phase of several months. When training is complete, leaders are recognized with the Wood Badge beads, neckerchief and woggle.

Training is also provided for all new den chiefs.

== Notes ==
A While any religious emblem may be earned as a Cub Scout and worn as a Scout, these are administered and awarded by religious institutions and are not considered Scouting America awards as such.
B Neck medallions were previously also awarded, but discontinued in 2001.
