= Order of the Arrow ceremonies and symbols =

Traditions of the Order of the Arrow

The Order of the Arrow (OA) relies heavily on ceremonies and symbols. While the content of these ceremonies are safeguarded by the OA, concerned parents may review the ceremonies and can refuse for their child to take part as membership is voluntary.

== Ceremonies ==
=== Unit election ===
Elections are held in the unit and organized by the Lodge. All youth members of the unit vote for those who best follow the Scout Oath and Law. Campaigning is not allowed and voting is done by secret ballot. To be elected, a scout must be voted for by at least half of the youth. Members may abstain from voting. To be eligible for election, a youth must:

- be a registered member of Scouting America
- have spent at least 15 nights camping within the last two years including one long-term trip consisting of at least five consecutive nights
- be under the age of 21
- hold the Scouts BSA First Class rank, the Venturing Discovery Award, or the Sea Scout Ordinary rank or higher
- be approved by their unit leader

Adults aged 21 or older may be nominated for membership by the unit committee. All adult nominees must be approved by the lodge’s adult selection committee.

=== Call-Out ===
Prior to the Induction, a Call-Out ceremony takes place. This is a public ceremony that officially recognizes the scouts who were elected to be candidates for membership. The ceremony is usually short, impressive and is made to allow all present to understand the importance of the Order of the Arrow membership.

=== Induction ===
Following the Call-Out, candidates participate in an induction weekend, intended to emphasize service and selflessness. At the conclusion of the weekend, the candidates become Induction members during the Induction ceremony.

=== Brotherhood ===
Induction members are entitled to all the same rights and privileges of membership as Brotherhood and Vigil Honor members—there are no ranks within the Order. However, moving on to Brotherhood membership offers an opportunity to reaffirm one's commitment to the Order. Arrowmen may "seal" their membership after six months by demonstrating their knowledge of the traditions and obligations of the OA. They then participate in a ceremony and become Brotherhood members.

=== Vigil Honor ===
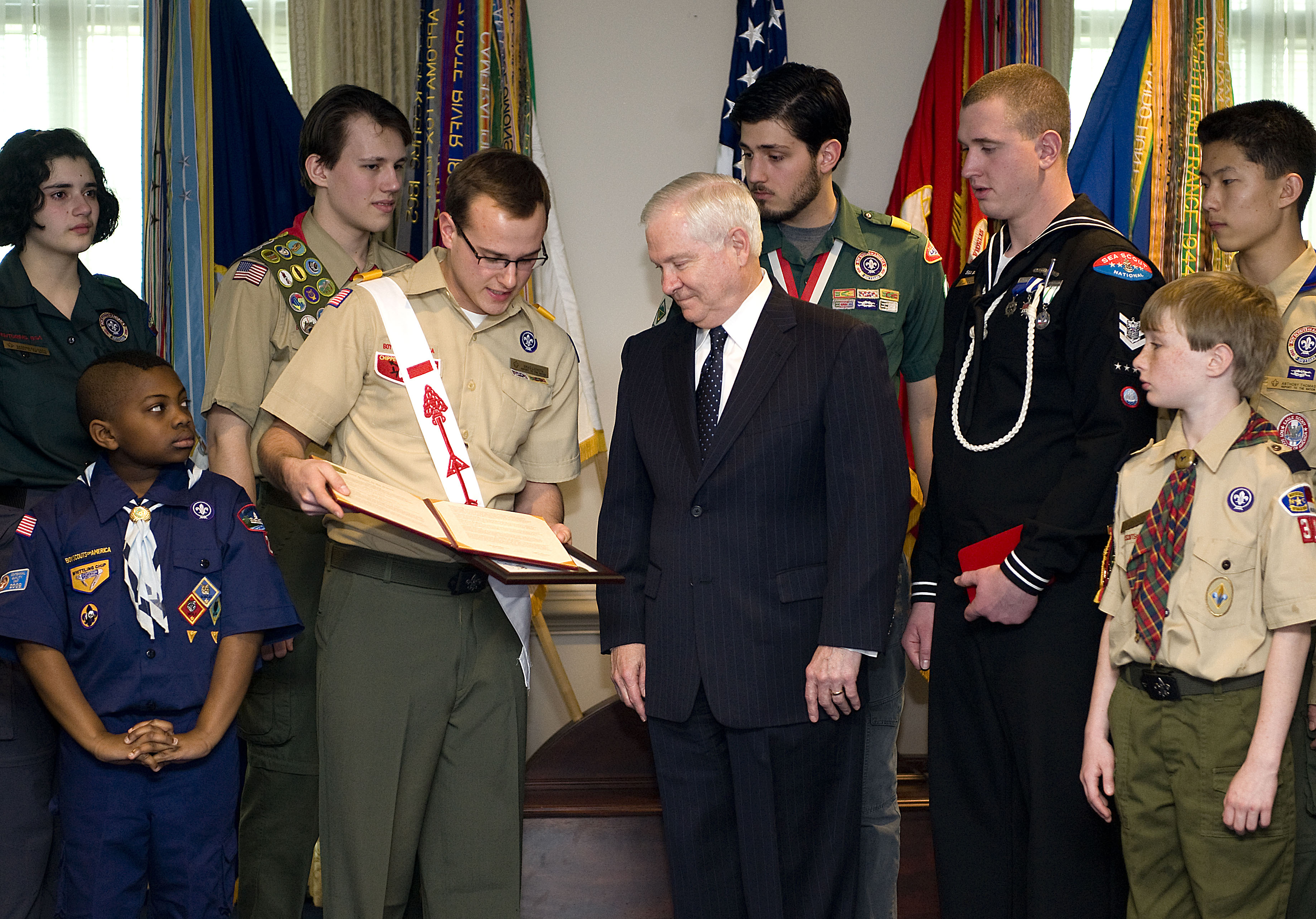
The National Chief wearing the Vigil Sash presenting the Report to the Nation in 2010

The Vigil Honor is a recognition given to Arrowmen for distinguished contributions beyond the immediate responsibilities of their position or office to their lodge, the Order of the Arrow, Scouting, or their Scout Camp. The Vigil Honor may be conferred upon Arrowmen who have completed a minimum of two years as a Brotherhood member and have performed exceptional service above and beyond their immediate responsibilities through leadership, exemplary efforts, and dedication. However, tenure in Scouting or the Order of the Arrow is not considered as a reason for a Vigil Honor recommendation. Selection is annual and is limited to one person for every 50 members of the lodge, and members of the Order can be inducted into the Vigil Honor only with the written approval of the National Order of the Arrow Committee.

As a part of the Vigil Honor induction, each new Vigil Honor member is given a Vigil Honor name, which represents a characteristic of the individual.

Order of the Arrow ceremonies were once considered to be secret, and consequently, the OA has been viewed by some as a secret society. With the introduction of Youth Protection program guidelines in 1980s, Scouting America has made clear that any concerned parent, guardian, or religious leader may view a video of the ceremonies, attend meetings, or read ceremonial texts upon request to a council, district, lodge, or chapter official to assure themselves that there is nothing objectionable. Such persons are asked to safeguard (conceal) the details relating to ceremonies for the sake of the participants. The intent of the provision for parents and religious leaders to be allowed access to ceremonies is to ensure that there is no religious conflict or violations of youth protection guidelines occurring. Parents have long been discouraged in many Lodges from seizing the opportunity to use the provision for photo opportunities with their sons, and some lodges have instituted bans on photography during the ceremonies. Hazing or demeaning initiation pranks are also prohibited by the OA and the BSA.

=== Induction history ===
There is no known written copy of the ritual used for the 1915 Treasure Island camping season. However, a few details are known, based on later testimonies. The first inductees were Robert Craig and Gilpin Allen who were inducted on July 16, 1915, and wore a black sash for the ceremony. E. Urner Goodman wore a black robe (similar to a graduation gown) with triangular badges on it with a black tortoise superimposed on the white triangle. He was the Chief of the Fire. Carroll Edson also wore a black robe similar to Goodman's with a white tortoise shaped badge on his chest. He was the Sachem. Harry A. Yoder, a staffer who had assisted in the construction of the fire guided the entire camp to the new campfire circle. He was however not a ceremonialist in the First Ceremony.

The first written Induction ceremony was written in 1921 along with the formation of the Grand Lodge. It was mimeographed on Letter size paper and distributed to the Supreme Chief of the Fire of each member lodge. Some changes were also introduced there:

- Water was to be applied to the left bared breast to symbolize the cleansing of the candidate from selfishness and evil
- A root-stock was to be chewed to symbolize the increase in strength and vigor to be used in the service of others.

The format was changed in 1927. It became a 24 pages 5"x7" booklet folded vertically. This format remained in place until 1998 when it was changed to an 8 1/2 x 11 booklet. In the booklet, the Pre-Ordeal Ceremony and the Ordeal Ceremony could be found along with the Legend in poetic form. The Brotherhood Ceremony was made in a booklet only in 1936 remaining a mimeographed document until then.

In the 2015 Edition of the Order of the Arrow Handbook, it is mentioned that non-members of the Order of the Arrow should not attend ceremonies but that it recognizes and respects the right of adults such as parents, Scout leaders or religious leader to have questions about the ceremony. The lodge adviser or his representative can discuss the content of the ceremony and concerns brought by the adult enquiring and that the adult will maintain the confidentiality of the ceremony. If questions remain unanswered, the adult will be permitted to read the text of the ceremony. Parents are allowed to refuse that their child take part in the ceremony and therefore that they join the Order of the Arrow.

The ceremonies utilize symbolic settings, rites, and principles to convey various Scouting ideals to participants. "The values of the Order of the Arrow, 'a brotherhood of cheerful service,' were passed on during a night-time ceremony: an arrowhead outlined with stones on the ground, candles on the stones, a huge bonfire at the base of the arrowhead, and at the point of the arrow a lectern from which was read, and danced, the story of heroic sacrifice for others."

== Symbols ==
=== Degree/Honor Symbols ===
==== White Sash ====
===== Evolution =====
Originally, the Sashes were called arrow bands. These bands were described as being in the original ceremony a black band with a white vertical stripe on the front made of the same material as black academic robes based on testimonies of early members. In the Ritual of the Second Degree (published around 1918 by Dr. William Hinkle), the band was moved from the right shoulder to the left shoulder right before the end of the ceremony. The same band was worn by First Degree (Ordeal) and Second Degree (Brotherhood) but on different shoulders. The earliest photographic evidence from 1919 from Treasure Island confirms that the bands were worn on both shoulders. No original sashes are known to exist today. This information comes from two testimonies from early members. According to Harry Yoder, the first guide and charter member of the Order wrote in 1921: "In the early days of the Order the members wore a black sash with a white stripe running lengthwise instead of the white band with the red arrow." George Chapman recounted in the unpublished work The Arrow and the Vigil (1953): "As has been previously mentioned, the officers of Wimachtendienk wore black robes for the induction ceremony. Members wore a black sash with a white arrow on it, very similar to the sash worn today except for the color."

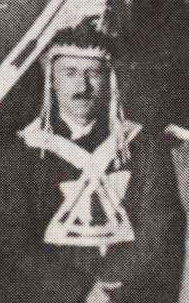
OA Leader Wearing the Triangle Vigil Sash in 1921

A black and white picture published in August 1921 in a Philadelphia newspaper on the Wimachtendienk shows the officers wearing black robes with a white band and a dark-colored arrow on top. It is unclear if that arrow was black or red. In 1921, when the Grand Lodge was formed, a picture was also taken showing members wearing the band on both left and right shoulder. It also shows Goodman and Edson wearing a sash in the shape of a triangle on the chest that appears to be a fraternal bib. This was the Third Degree bib-type sash. The first known physical examples of the white sash with a red arrow dates back from around 1922. First Degree and Second Degree had a white wool-felt band with red wool-felt arrows sewn on it. The Vigil Honor had a white wool-felt band without an arrow and a red Vigil triangle with arrows on each side. These were made by the Grand Lodge and remained mainly unchanged from 1921 to 1948. Region 7 however, used bands made of twill cloth with arrows in red linen from the late 1920s to the mid-1930s.

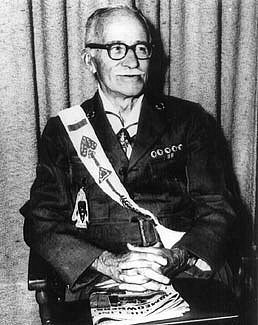
E. Urner Goodman with the old oversized Vigil triangle sash

In 1948, the Order retained the white wool-felt for the band but the red arrow was flocked silk-screened on it. The Vigil Honor had a large red wool-felt triangle with the white arrows silk-screened. In 1950, it was decided that the sash would go on the right shoulder only. The sash changed again: Brotherhood bars were flocked onto the sashed to distinguish Induction from Brotherhood. In 1951/1952, the Vigil oversized triangle was replaced by a small triangle. All the sashes used the same silk-screening process and were all the same size.

In 1955, the wool-felt was replaced with twill material and the silk-screen was replaced by embroidery. The Sash had two plies of material so the embroidery did not show through. Over the years, the stitching on the edge evolved but the sash remained the same. The arrows on the Vigil Honor triangle were manufactured both counterclockwise as well as clockwise. In 1988, the arrows and other red symbols were hot ironed on the sash. This was short lived as the sashes did not survive the wash and by 1990, the sashes were embroidered again. It has remained unchanged to this day.

==== Today ====
At formal events or Order of the Arrow functions, Arrowmen can be readily identified by a white sash bearing a red arrow that is worn over their right shoulder. An Induction member wears a sash with a lone arrow. The Brotherhood member wears a sash bearing an arrow with a red bar at each end of the arrow. A Vigil Honor member wears a sash with the same bars of as the Brotherhood sash at each end of the arrow, and a Vigil Honor triangle on the center of the shaft. The OA sash is not worn at the same time as the merit badge sash, nor worn folded in the belt. The sash as a form of recognition dates to the founding of the Order and has a long history of changes in usage and design.

It is not worn at troop meetings, campouts, or Courts of Honor, as it is a symbol of the OA. It is appropriate to wear it at events where OA business is taking place such as Unit Election, Lodge Fellowship, Lodge Meetings, etc.

==== Ribbon ====
Order of the Arrow universal ribbon

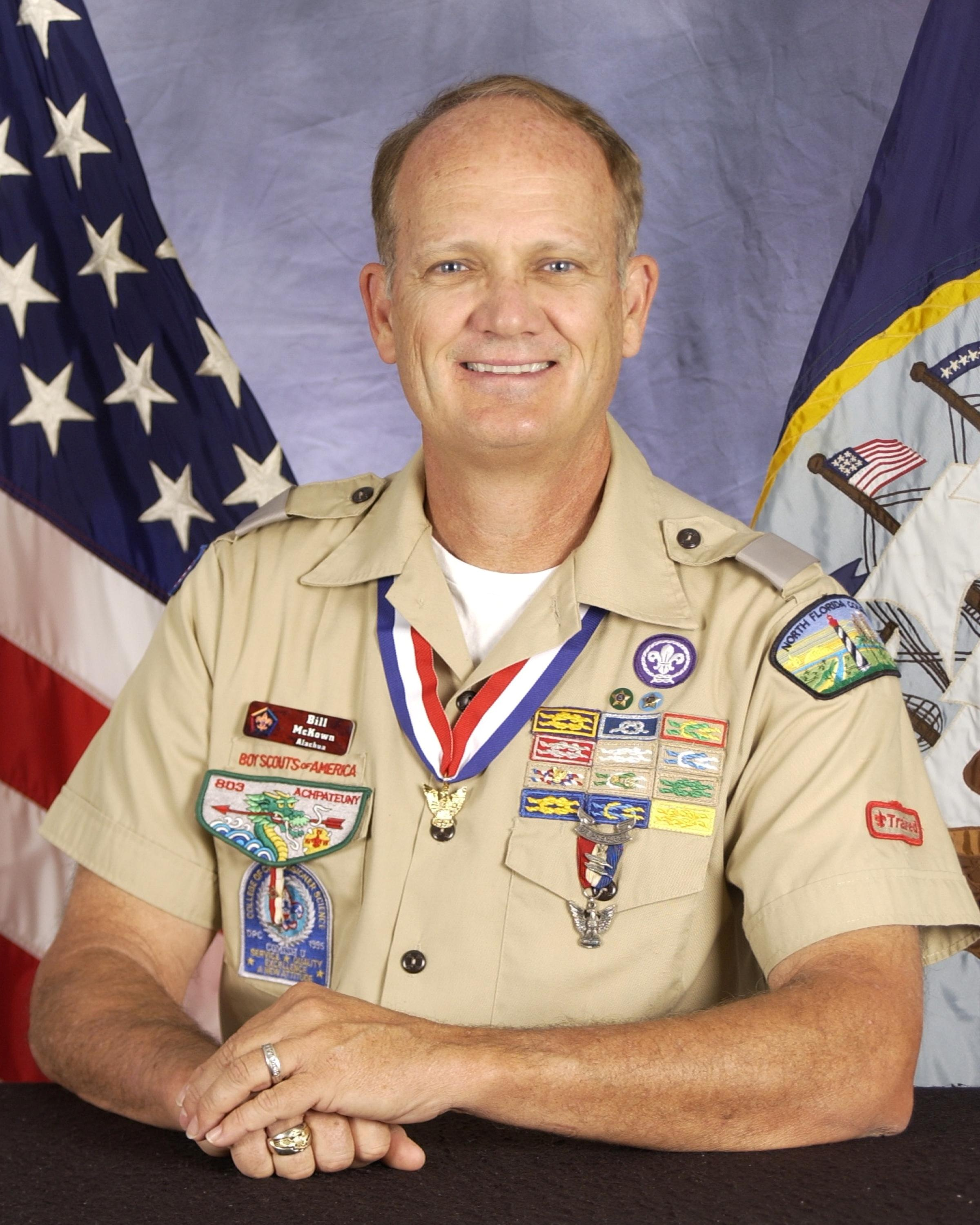
Clarence William "Bill" McKown, CAPT USN (Ret) in his BSA leader's uniform wearing both the Ribbon and the pocket flap patch

The early pins were replaced by the ribbon. However, the ribbon does not indicate the Honor of the wearer, only the membership to the OA and only the sash references the Honor today.

Order members may choose to wear the OA Universal Ribbon also known as "Dangles" suspended from the right uniform shirt pocket button.

The Ribbon was introduced in 1942. This was the first time Arrowmen could officially wear the OA symbol. It was very similar to the current version and was made of red and white silk with a sterling arrow. The first arrows pointed left instead of right, pointing left over the wearer's shoulder. In 1950, the OA removed the code words referencing "left" and replaced it with "right". In 1952, the ribbon also switched to point over the wearer's right shoulder.

Additional award pins can be attached to the ribbon including the Order of the Arrow 75th Anniversary Achievement from 1990 and the Order of the Arrow Arrowman Service Award Ribbon Pin issued between January 1, 2001, and December 31, 2003.

==== Other Symbolism ====
Arrowmen also exchange a special handshake as a token of brotherhood, along with other signs and passwords. A signature acronym, WWW (Wimachtendienk Wingolauchsik Witahemui – Brotherhood of Cheerful Service), is often depicted in publications, regalia, etc.

=== Lodge Symbols ===
==== Totem Pins ====
Since the Order of the Arrow was founded as a fraternal organization, it followed similar traditions similar to its counterparts. These organizations often used small pins made of precious metals as insignias. In Article III of the first constitution of the Order of the Arrow from 1916, three recognition pieces are described:

- a silver arrow pledge for candidates (now Induction)*
- a gold tortoise and arrow pin for First Degree (now Brotherhood)*
- a gold tortoise and triangle for Second Degree (now Vigil)*

*The Induction in 1916 was considered a pledge and not a full membership. Therefore, there were only two degrees.

The pledge (Induction) pin is almost identical to the silver arrow pin still found today except it is now die-struck as opposed to poured into a die.

These pins were mandatory in the beginning of the order. However, due to the cost of the silver and gold used in their manufacturing, these pins were not always manufactured by the Lodges. The pins were made by several jewelers over the years. The use of pins became optional. These pins were not to be worn on the sash or on the BSA uniform but only on civilian clothes.

The Grand Lodge Insignia Committee required that each lodge have its own distinct totem in a similar way as the heraldry rule that no two coats of arms can be the same. The idea was that members could determine the status and local affiliation of another member just by looking at their pin while non-members would be clueless of the meaning of the pin. By 1930, the requirement for each Lodge to have its own totem became impractical due to the number of Lodges being created.

These were the ancestors of the current Lodge Pocket Flap Patches. These pins were used along with the Ribbon after it was introduced in 1942. Some lodges still make these pins but they are rare.

==== Lodge Pocket Flaps Patches ====
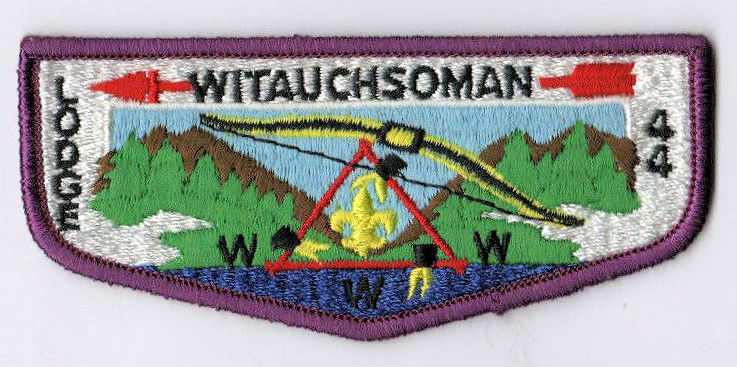
1960 OA Pohopoco Lodge 44 Pocket Flap for the Lehigh Council, PA feathuring the Arrow and the WWW commonly found on flaps

In a 1938 National Meeting at Camp Irondale, Missouri, shows several arrowmen wearing lodges patches of different shapes. These patches were a deviation from the national uniform standard at the time. However, this practice would become mainstream and official. It would replace the Early Lodge Pins. Indeed, a pin could cost upward of $4.50 while a lodge patch could be purchased for 20 cents. Finally, in 1945, the BSA Uniform Committee agreed to the use of the Lodge Patch. However, it was omitted from the 1948 Order of the Arrow Handbook. The use of the lodge patch was advocated in the handbook but it did not indicate that it had to be worn on the right pocket. As a result, each lodge had its own way of placing the patches. It was the Ajapeu Lodge in Doylstown, PA, around 1942 that had the right shirt pocket flap as the OA location.

It took until 1954 for the national OA committee to finally offer clarification with the following decision: "It is strongly recommended by the National Committee that these emblems be made to fit the shape of the right shirt pocket flap. The right shirt pocket flap has been approved by the National Committee on Badges and Insignia for official Order of the Arrow Insignia where the other emblems are only temporary insignia when used on the uniform. It should be realized that this is a great advantage and a complement to the Order of the Arrow."

OA membership and Lodge affiliation are indicated by the wearing of the lodge emblem (commonly known as a lodge flap), an embroidered patch is worn on the right pocket flap of the uniform shirt. Each lodge flap has a unique design, generally reflecting the name, geography or history of the lodge. Part of this is a totem that represents the lodge. The flap was officially approved by the National Committee in 1954. No other organization has received the honor from Boy Scouts of America to have a portion of the uniform reserved for their own use. Special issues of flaps are created to commemorate anniversaries and other events, and are a popular item for those who engage in Scouting memorabilia collecting.

The Lodge Flap has over time grown and today many Lodge Flaps are actually two patches: one for the flap and one for the pocket itself. Since 2007 with Operations Update 07–8, Lodges can not create flaps that are larger than the flap itself. The two part sets comply with the guidelines if they are made of two separate pieces, the two parts can be worn independently from one another and the flap patch stays within the boundaries of the pocket flap.

=== National Bonnets ===
In 1938, a bonnet made was made by members of the Anicus Lodge of Golden eagle feathers in the fashion of a Native American War bonnet. It was gifted to the National Lodge of the OA in 1940 to be worn by the chief of the National Lodge. It would be used for over 40 years for the opening and closing shows of NOAC as well as National Planning Meetings and other national events.

Since 1918 with the Migratory Bird Treaty Act, the Federal Government had started protected birds and slowly restricting the use of some bird feathers and other body parts. In 1940, the Bald Eagle Protection Act was passed protecting Bald Eagles exclusively. This Act would be extended to the Golden Eagle in 1962. This law is enforced by the United States Fish and Wildlife Service (USFWS). On January 1, 1976, with the encouragement of the USFWS, the National OA Committee issued its "Protected Feather Clarification" policy, prohibiting the use of animal parts in the construction of Native American regalia used at Scouting events. The USFWS made an allowance for the use of the bonnet and it continued to be used after that date.

In November 1980, a fire destroyed BSA's National Office where the bonnet was on display and it was destroyed. The National OA Committee announced it would construct two replacement bonnets. For the first time, the national vice chief would also wear a bonnet. Various options were proposed to complete this while also complying with the Law. Eventually, the solution came from the USFWS itself. After confirming that the original bonnet was made of real eagle feathers obtained prior to the enactment of the laws, approval was granted to replace the original bonnet with two bonnets. Each was made of 32 real golden eagle feathers tipped with owl feathers provided by the USFWS. The feathers came from illegal bonnets confiscated by USFWS and were offered to BSA/OA by the Federal agency via a special permit/loan agreement for scientific and educational purposes. The replacement were first starting in 1982 and used until 2004.

In keeping with its policy on Protected Feathers, the bonnets were retired and replaced with new replica bonnets using imitation eagle feathers. These bonnets were first used in 2005.
