= Scouter's Training Award =

Adult recognition of the Boy Scouts of America

- Medal, knot and program devices
- Owner: Scouting America
- Country: United States
- Created: 1932
- Awarded for: Completion of a set of training and performance goals, during a specified period of time.
Previous; Position Trained	Next; Scouter's Key Award

The Scouter's Training Award is an adult recognition of Scouting America. This award is available across several different program areas and can be earned more than once.

== History ==
In 1927 the Boy Scouts of America began to recognize Scoutmasters who completed specific training and performance goals over a five-year period of service with the Scoutmaster's Key. In 1932 the award was opened up to other Scouters with the Scouter's Training Award. The original award was a medal suspended from a green ribbon with the universal emblem superimposed over a "V", representing the five years of service requirement.

In 1948, the award was renamed Scouter's Award and the period of service was changed from five years to three years. The emblem was then changed from a "V" to the current design of an "A". The name reverted to Scouter's Training Award in 1954. A redesign of the ribbon in 1956 added a thin white stripe to the center of the ribbon, bringing the design of the award to the current appearance.

Prior to 1988 the award could be earned by Cub Scouting leaders until the introduction of the Cub Scouting leader awards. Those separate awards were discontinued in 2012 and the Scouter's Training Award for Cub Scouting was restored.

In 2013, requirements for a District Committee Scouter's Training Award was released. By adding this award and revising the requirements for the District Committee Key, it brings these awards' requirements in line with the equivalent unit leader awards.

== Award ==
The medal consists of a pendant suspended from a green ribbon with a thin white vertical stripe. The pendant is the BSA universal emblem superimposed on an "A", all of a brass colored metal. The square knot insignia is an embroidered green square knot on a cloth khaki patch. Multiple awards are denoted by the wear of program devices, worn on the square knot award and the ribbon of the award medal.

== Requirements ==
Requirements vary, depending on position, but all requirements basically amount to creation and/or maintenance of a quality Scouting program. The award may be earned as the Scouter's Training Award for Cub Scouts, Scouter's Training Award for Boy Scouts, Varsity Scout Leader Training Award, Venturing Leader Training Award, Sea Scout Leader Training Award or Roundtable Staff Training Award.

Scouter's Training Award for Cub Scouts is for all Cub Scout leaders. They must have at least two years of tenure as a registered adult Cub Scout leader, complete This Is Scouting training, and complete basic training for their position. They must attend a pow-wow, university of Scouting, or four roundtable meetings during each year of the tenure for this award. In addition, in each year, they must participate in an annual pack planning meeting; their pack must achieve at least the Bronze level of Journey to Excellence; they must give primary leadership in meeting at least one pack Journey to Excellence objective; and they must participate in at least one additional supplemental or advanced training event at the council level or higher.

Scouter's Training Award for Scouts, BSA is for all Scout leaders. They must have at least two years of tenure as a registered adult Scout leader, complete This Is Scouting training, and complete basic training for their position. They must attend a university of Scouting or four roundtable meetings during each year of the tenure for this award. In addition, in each year, they must participate in an annual troop planning meeting; their troop must achieve at least the Bronze level of Journey to Excellence; they must give primary leadership in meeting at least one troop Journey to Excellence objective; and they must participate in at least one additional supplemental or advanced training event at the council level or higher.

Adult leader training in Scouts, BSA always starts with Youth Protection Training. For basic position training, Scoutmasters and Assistant Scoutmasters need to complete the Scoutmaster and Assistant Scoutmaster Specific Training and Introduction to Outdoor Leader Skills. The committee chairman and committee members should complete Troop Committee Challenge.

Prior to 2013, the requirements were similar, except leaders were required to complete any five electives from a list of 12. These included participation in campouts, Friends of Scouting presentations, parents’ nights or courts of honor, troop money-earning projects, and council or district training events. Leaders could also complete Wood Badge or other supplemental training, serve as a merit badge counselor or a troop committee member, work with a Webelos Scout den, help organize or reorganize a troop, or participate in Boy Scout leader roundtables.

Varsity Scout Leader Training Award

- Complete Varsity Scout Leader Fast Start training
- Complete New Leader Essentials
- Complete Varsity Coach Leader Specific Training
- Complete Introduction to Outdoor Leader Skills (for Coaches and assistants)
- Complete a total of two years as a registered adult Varsity Scout leader
- Do any five of the following:
1. Participate in a team leader seminar
2. Help with two annual unit and/or district Friends of Scouting presentations
3. Serve as a Varsity Scout program instructor or training course staff member
4. Participate actively in three team parents’ nights or courts of honor
5. Coordinate at least one team money-earning project
6. Serve for at least one year as team committee person assigned to one of the five program fields of emphasis
7. Participate in six Varsity Scout leader huddles
8. Serve as an approved merit badge counselor for at least five Varsity Scouts
9. Serve for at least one year as chairman of a Varsity Scout team committee
10. Serve for at least one year on the Varsity Scout huddle staff
11. Help organize or reorganize a Varsity Scout team

This award was retired at the end of 2018, when the Varsity Scouting program ended.

Venturing Leader Training Award

- Complete Fast Start.
- Complete Venturing Leader Specific Training
- Complete a total of two years as a registered adult Venturing leader
- Do any seven of the following
1. Participate in a support role for five crew weekend activities
2. Serve on the staff of a district, council, area, region, or national Venturing training event
3. Help with two Friends of Scouting enrollments
4. Assist with a Venturing Leadership Skills Course
5. Serve as a Bronze, Gold, Silver, or Ranger consultant
6. Participate in six Venturing roundtables or teen leaders’ councils
7. Help organize or reorganize a Venturing crew
8. Participate in two crew parents’ nights
9. Help support a crew money-earning project
10. Participate in a crew open house
11. Participate in a crew officers’ seminar

Sea Scout Leader Training Award

- Complete This is Scouting training
- Complete Venturing Youth Protection Training
- Complete Sea Scout Adult Leader Basic Training
- Complete a boating safety course offered by the U.S. Coast Guard Auxiliary, U.S. Power Squadrons, or similar organization
- Complete three years of registered tenure in any adult capacity in Sea Scouts
- Perform, to the satisfaction of the Skipper, your assigned leadership duties

Roundtable Staff Training Award

- Review with the roundtable commissioner orientation material in the current Cub Scout Roundtable Planning Guide, Boy Scout Roundtable Planning Guide, or Venturing Roundtable Guide
- Review all material in the current Cub Scout Program Helps/Webelos Leader Guide, Troop Program Features, or Varsity Scout Game Plan
- Complete basic training for Cub Scout, Boy Scout, Varsity, or Venturing roundtable commissioners
- Complete two years as a registered roundtable staff member
- Do the following:
1. Develop and exhibit a display related to the theme at one roundtable
2. Conduct an opening activity and an opening ceremony
3. Conduct or be responsible for a major project, presentation, or demonstration at one roundtable
4. Participate in six roundtable staff meetings
5. Actively assist in six roundtables
6. Conduct a successful roundtable attendance promotion project

While it existed, this award could be earned four times: Cub Scout Roundtable Staff, Boy Scout Roundtable Staff, Varsity Scout Huddle Staff and Venturing Roundtable Staff. The award was retired in 2013, when the roundtable and huddle staff positions were eliminated and replaced by assistant roundtable commissioners, who may earn the Arrowhead Honor instead.

District Committee Training Award is for members who have served for at least two years on the District Committee. Qualifying tenure for this award must have been since January 1, 2011. They must complete This is Scouting training, attend a District Committee Training Workshop, and review the district manual and discuss their role with their operating committee chair, district chairman or District Executive. During their tenure they must have attended six district committee meetings, been a member of an operating committee that reached bronze in their Journey to Excellence objectives for each year, and participated in one additional supplemental or advanced training.

== See also ==
- Advancement and recognition in the Boy Scouts of America
- Scouter's Key Award
