= Scouting memorabilia collecting =

Collections related to Scouting

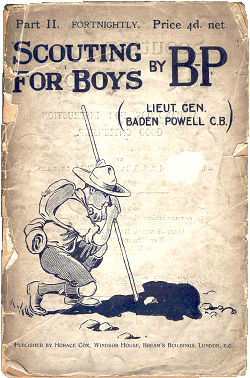
Second edition of Scouting for Boys by Lord Baden-Powell, published in January 1908, illustrated by Baden-Powell

Scouting memorabilia collecting is the hobby and study of preserving and cataloging Boy Scouting and Girl Guiding items for their historic, aesthetic and monetary value.

== Campfire blankets ==
The camp blanket is a significant piece of memorabilia for many Scouts and Girl Guides around the world. Scouts and Guides sew badges onto the blanket to represent all their achievements and events competed in, and out, of Scouting. Camp blankets are often used to display and store badges "earned" in a younger section, e.g. a Guide will sew her Brownie badges onto her blanket or a Scout will sew his Cub badges.
