= Batabanó =

Batabanó can refer to:

- Batabanó, Cuba, a municipality in Cuba
- Gulf of Batabanó, a bay in Cuba
- Surgidero de Batabanó, a village in Cuba
