= 1901 Atlantic hurricane season =

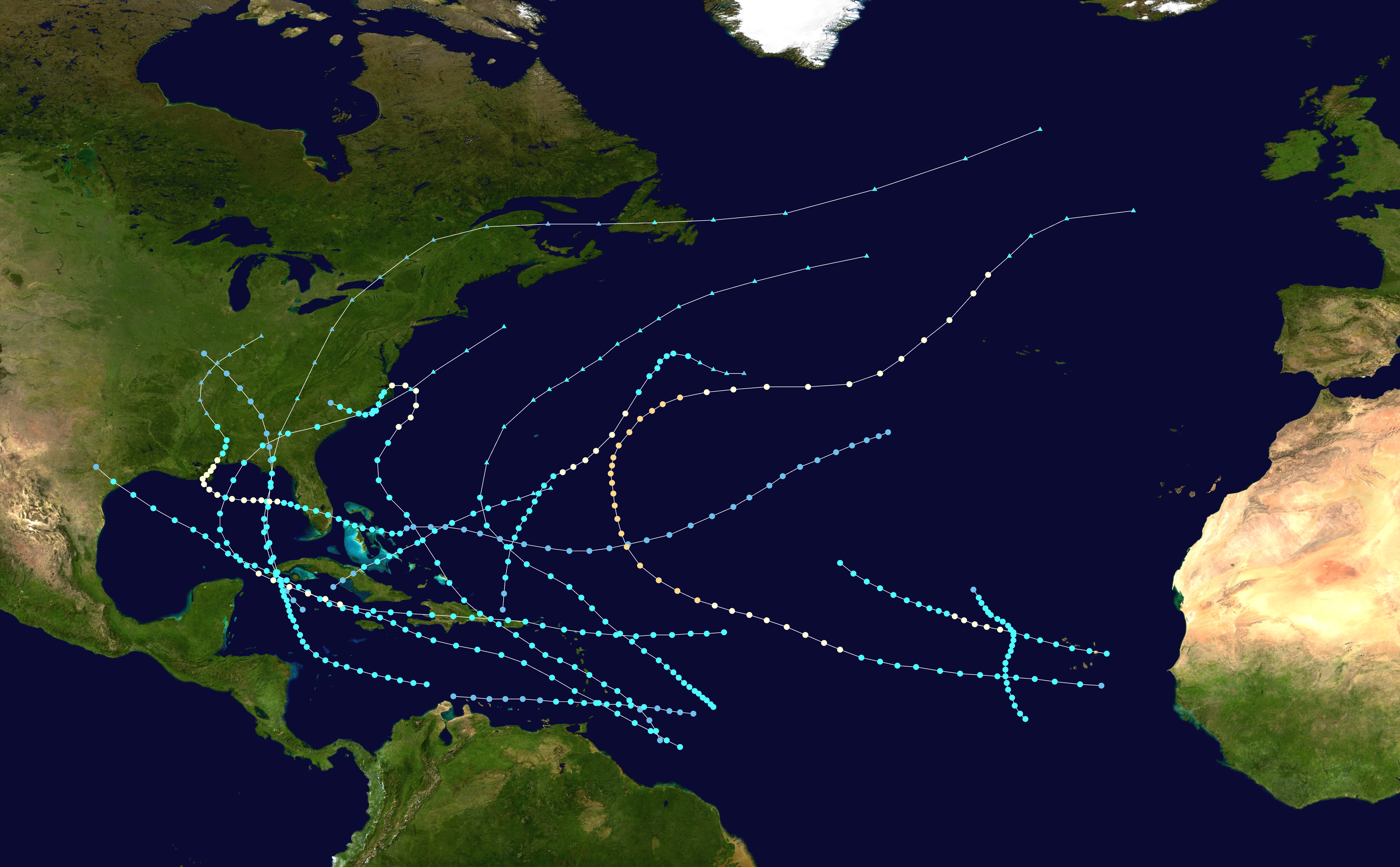
- Season summary map

Seasonal boundaries
- First system formed: June 11, 1901
- Last system dissipated: November 5, 1901

Strongest storm
- By maximum sustained winds: Seven
  - Maximum winds: 105 mph (165 km/h) (1-minute sustained)
  - Lowest pressure: 991 mbar (hPa; 29.26 inHg)
- By central pressure: Four
  - Maximum winds: 90 mph (150 km/h) (1-minute sustained)
  - Lowest pressure: 973 mbar (hPa; 28.73 inHg)

Seasonal statistics
- Total depressions: 14
- Total storms: 13
- Hurricanes: 6
- Major hurricanes (Cat. 3+): 0
- Total fatalities: 35-40
- Total damage: $1 million (1901 USD)

Related articles
- 1900–09 Pacific hurricane seasons; 1901 Pacific typhoon season; 1900s North Indian Ocean cyclone seasons

The 1901 Atlantic hurricane season was the most active season without a major hurricane – tropical cyclones that reach at least Category 3 on the Saffir–Simpson hurricane wind scale – until 2013. The first system was initially observed in the northeastern Caribbean on June 11. The fourteenth and final system transitioned into an extratropical cyclone near Bermuda on November 5. These dates fall within the period with the most tropical cyclone activity in the Atlantic. Eight of the fourteen tropical cyclones existed simultaneously.

Of the season's fourteen tropical cyclones, thirteen became a tropical storm, and six of those strengthened into a hurricane. With no major hurricanes occurring in the following year, 1901 and 1902 were the first time that two consecutive seasons lacked a major hurricane since 1864 and 1865. The fourth and eighth systems were the deadliest and most damaging storms of season. The fourth storm, known as the Louisiana hurricane, which left about $1 million (1901 USD) (Note: All damage figures are in 1901 USD, unless otherwise noted) in damage and 10-15 fatalities in Louisiana. In September, the eighth cyclone impacted some islands of the Greater and Lesser Antilles, including Puerto Rico, Hispaniola, and Cuba. There were five fatalities during boating accidents in Virginia. At the French overseas territory of Saint Pierre and Miquelon, three people drowned after a schooner capsized.

The Atlantic hurricane reanalysis project also indicated but could not confirm the presence of an additional tropical storm in October 1901, instead listing the cyclone as a tropical depression. However, the reanalysis added a previously undetected hurricane in late August to the Atlantic hurricane database (HURDAT). The seventh tropical cyclone that year was the strongest by maximum sustained winds, peaking at 105 mph (170 km/h), equivalent to a Category 2 hurricane. However, the fourth hurricane had a lower barometric pressure and was thus the most intense storm of the season.

== Season summary ==
Tropical cyclogenesis began with the development of the first tropical storm on June 11 in the northwestern Caribbean. July featured two tropical storms, one of which strengthened into a hurricane. By July 5, the season had three tropical storms. In comparison, the average date of development of the first tropical storm between 1944 and 1996 was July 11. August was the most active month of the season. There were four tropical storms, three of which intensified into hurricanes. The fourth system was the most intense tropical cyclone of the season, peaking as a Category 1 hurricane with maximum sustained winds of 90 mph (145 km/h) with a minimum barometric pressure of 973 mbar (28.7 inHg). Although the seventh cyclone was a Category 2 hurricane with winds of 105 mph (170 km/h), a lower minimum barometric pressure was not recorded. In September, three additional system formed, one of which became a hurricane. October featured the same amount of activity, but also had a short-lived tropical depression. The season's final system developed on October 30 and transitioned into an extratropical cyclone on November 5.

With a total of 13 tropical storms, this was the most active season without a major hurricane until 2013, which had 14 named storms and no systems reaching at least Category 3. The seventh storm was considered a major hurricane until reanalysis by Jose Fernandez-Partagas and Henry Diaz in 1997, who revised the intensity to a Category 2 hurricane because observations did not support Category 3. In 2008, an additional hurricane was added to HURDAT, which existed in late August over the far eastern Atlantic Ocean. A tropical depression in early October may have become a tropical storm, but data was inconclusive. Nearly all of the season's 14 tropical cyclones impacted land. Collectively, the storms caused over $1 million in damage and at least 35-40 fatalities.

The season's activity was reflected with an accumulated cyclone energy (ACE) rating of 99. ACE is a metric used to express the energy used by a tropical cyclone during its lifetime. Therefore, a storm with a longer duration will have high values of ACE. It is only calculated at six-hour increments in which specific tropical and subtropical systems are either at or above sustained wind speeds of 39 mph (63 km/h), which is the threshold for tropical storm intensity. Thus, tropical depressions are not included here.

== Systems ==
=== Tropical Storm One ===
- Tropical storm (SSHWS)
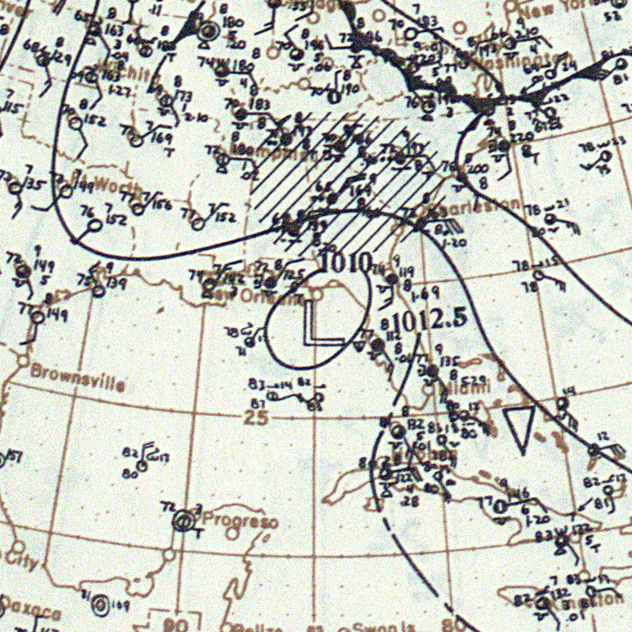
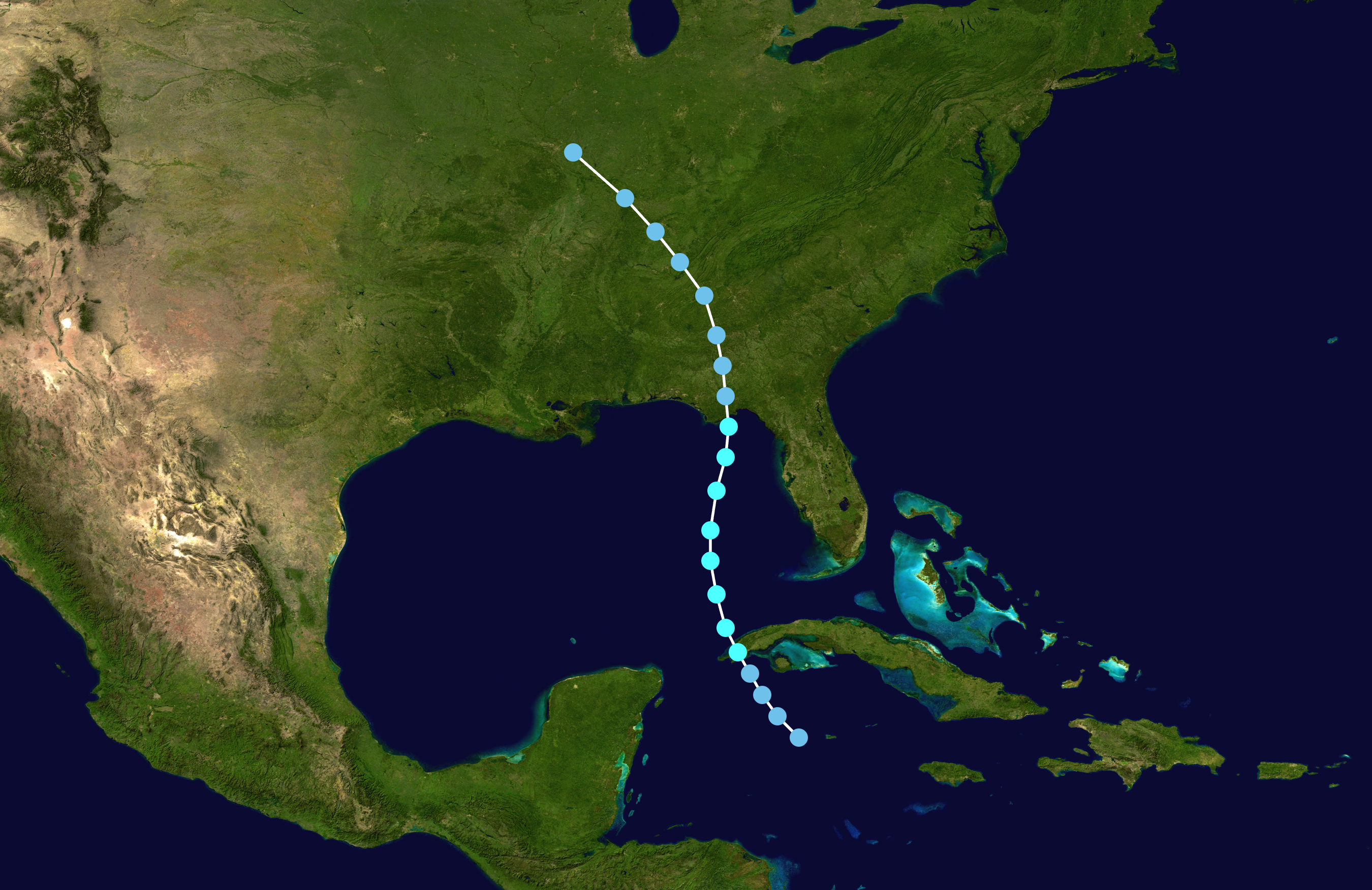
- Duration: June 11 – June 15
- Peak intensity: 40 mph (65 km/h) (1-min); <1010 mbar (hPa)

The first tropical depression of the season developed over the Caribbean just west of the Cayman Islands on June 11. Moving northeastward, it strengthened into a tropical storm shortly before landfall in western Cuba early the next day. Locations such as Havana recorded rainfall, but no unusually strong winds. Thereafter, the storm moved generally northward across the eastern Gulf of Mexico and likely maintained the same intensity as a 40 mph (65 km/h) tropical storm. On the east coast of Florida, a wind speed of 36 mph (58 km/h) was observed in Jupiter. At 21:00 UTC on June 13, the cyclone made landfall near Carrabelle, Florida. Charleston, South Carolina, far from the center, observed winds of 43 mph (69 km/h). Although the system weakened to a depression by early on June 14, it persisted until dissipating over Illinois late on June 15.

=== Tropical Storm Two ===
- Tropical storm (SSHWS)
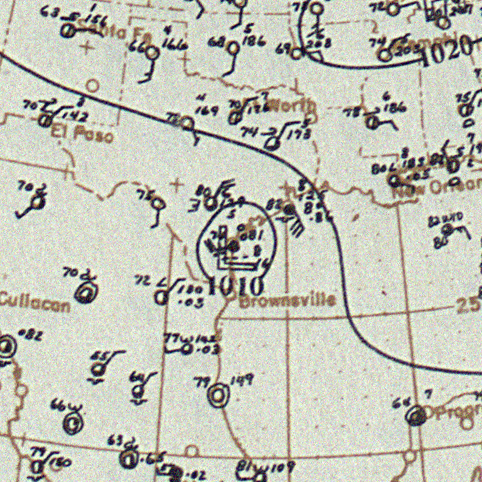
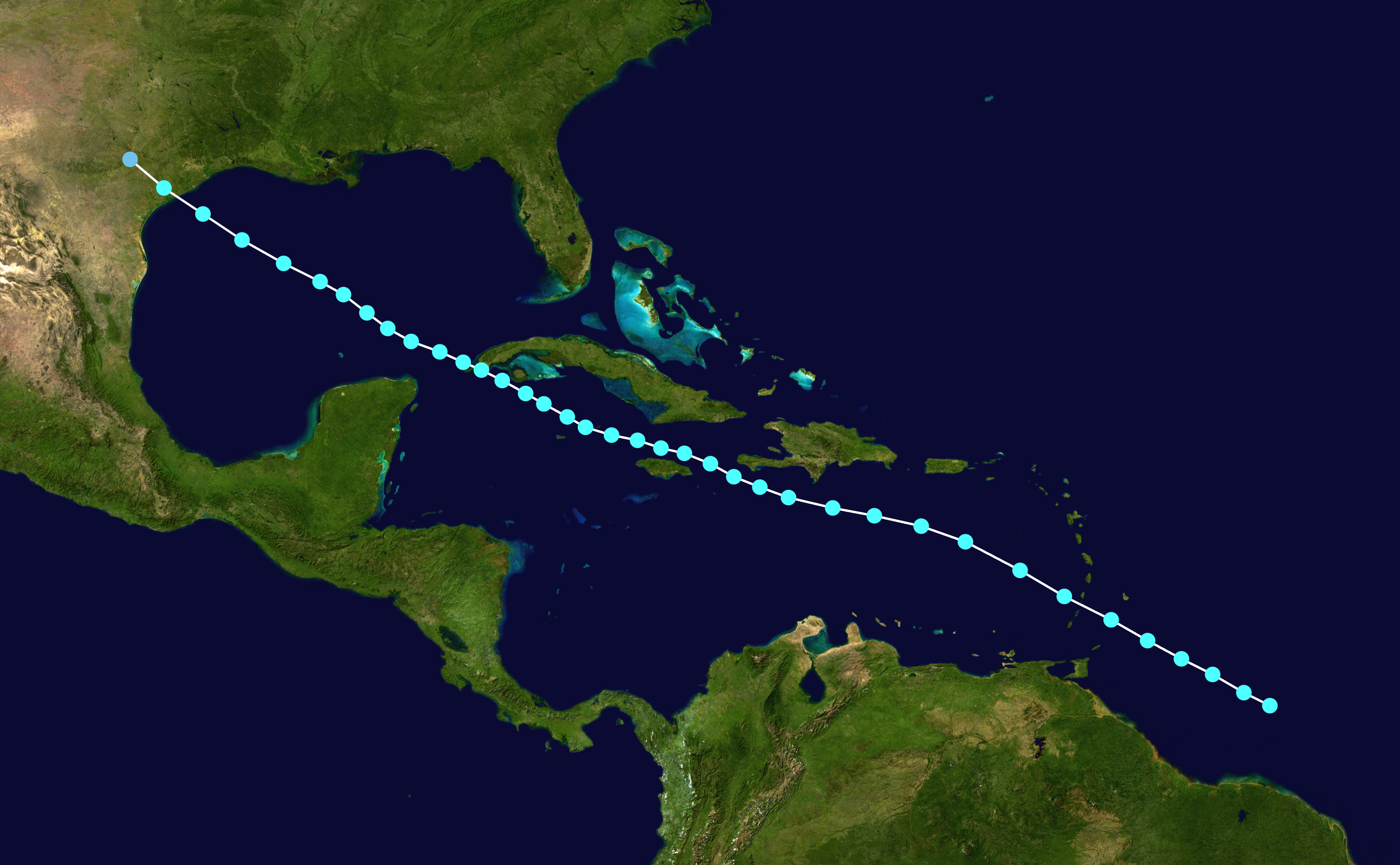
- Duration: July 1 – July 10
- Peak intensity: 70 mph (110 km/h) (1-min); <1007 mbar (hPa)

The second storm of the season was first observed on July 1 about 225 miles (360 km) north of the modern day French Guiana–Suriname border. The cyclone intensified slowly and moved northwestward, reaching the Windward Islands early on July 3. Around that time, the cyclone passed between Grenada and Saint Vincent and the Grenadines, with little impact. By July 5, the system peaked as a strong tropical storm with maximum sustained winds of 70 mph (115 km/h), while beginning to curve west-northwestward over the eastern Caribbean Sea. In Dominican Republic, flooding occurred in the region between Cotuí, Santo Domingo, and Vega Real, with rivers overflowing their banks. Additionally, high winds knocked out telegraphic communication with the city of Santo Domingo. Strong winds and "severe rain" were reported in Haiti, where several vessels along the coast were wrecked. Fourteen deaths occurred, with nine in Les Cayes and five in Jacmel. Later on July 5, the storm passed to the southwest of the Tiburon Peninsula.

Thereafter, the storm paralleled the south coast of Cuba, until making landfall in Pinar del Río Province late on July 7. Abnormally high tides and strong winds caused flooding in a majority of homes along the south coast of the province. Early on July 8, the system emerged into the Gulf of Mexico. The Weather Bureau office in Galveston, Texas, began warning residents of the approaching cyclone on July 9. The system weakened while approaching the coast, and around 10:00 UTC on the following day, it made landfall near Matagorda with winds of 50 mph (80 km/h). Some locations reported tropical storm force winds. Tides caused water to reach waterfront streets in Galveston. The storm quickly weakened and dissipated late on July 10.

=== Hurricane Three ===
- Category 1 hurricane (SSHWS)
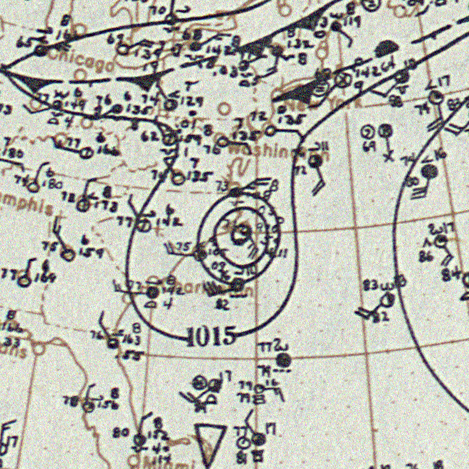
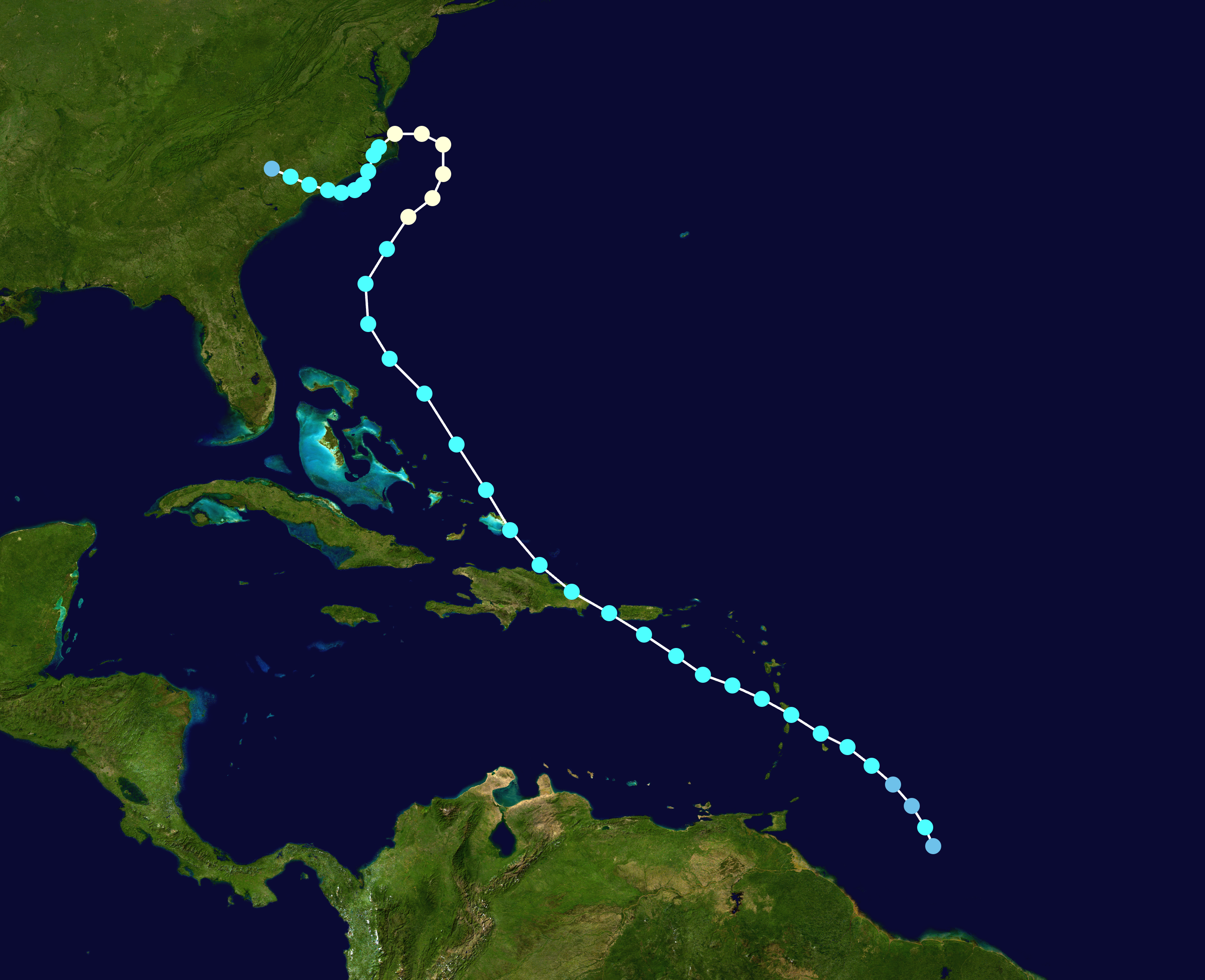
- Duration: July 4 – July 13
- Peak intensity: 80 mph (130 km/h) (1-min); 983 mbar (hPa)

Hurricane San Cirilo of 1901
A tropical depression developed about 250 mi (400 km) north of Paramaribo, Suriname, early on July 4. The cyclone moved northwestward and intensified into a tropical storm about 24 hours later. Late on July 5, the storm either brushed or struck Martinique. The system soon entered the Caribbean Sea and continued to strengthen. It brushed near the southwestern tip of Puerto Rico early on July 7. Several hours the storm made landfall north of Punta Cana, Dominican Republic, with winds of 70 mph (115 km/h) and then briefly emerged into the Atlantic before striking the Samaná Peninsula. By 18:00 UTC on July 7, the system reemerged into the Atlantic. Early the following day, the cyclone brushed East Caicos as a strong tropical storm. It curved northeastward late on July 9 and resumed intensification, likely due to the warm sea surface temperatures over the Gulf Stream.

Early on July 10, the storm became a hurricane, shortly before peaking with maximum sustained winds of 80 mph (130 km/h) and a minimum barometric pressure of 983 mbar (29.0 inHg), both of which were observed by ships. The hurricane recurved to the west early on July 11 and made landfall between Kill Devil Hills and Nags Head in North Carolina at the same intensity. Quickly weakening to a tropical storm after a few hours, the cyclone southwestward and reemerged into the Atlantic early on July 12. Turning to the west-northwest, it made landfall near modern-day Kure Beach at 22:00 UTC with winds of 40 mph (65 km/h). Late on July 13, the storm weakened to a tropical depression and dissipated over South Carolina shortly thereafter.

"Considerable damage" was reported in Saint Kitts. The storm is known as San Cirilo in Puerto Rico, where heavy rainfall occurred, particularly in the southwestern portion of the island, with 17.22 in (437 mm) observed at Hacienda La Perla. Flooding was reported along the Río Grande de Loíza and Caugus rivers. The Weather Bureau office in San Juan observed a wind speed of 52 mph (84 km/h). In Virginia, winds averaged 50 mph (80 km/h) at Cape Henry late on July 10 through early on July 11, downing power lines in the area. A woman in Richmond was killed after being hit by a tree that was struck by lightning. A number of trees were level and lost their fruit due to heavy rainfall and strong winds in Berryville. A barn was destroyed after being struck by lightning and set ablaze. At Chesapeake Bay, artillery practice was interrupted after strong winds destroyed the floating targets. In North Carolina, winds reached 39 mph (63 km/h) at Hatteras.

=== Hurricane Four ===
- Category 1 hurricane (SSHWS)
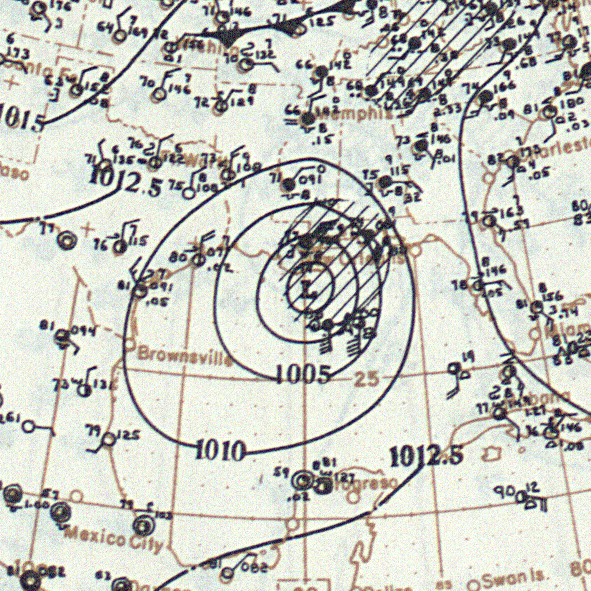
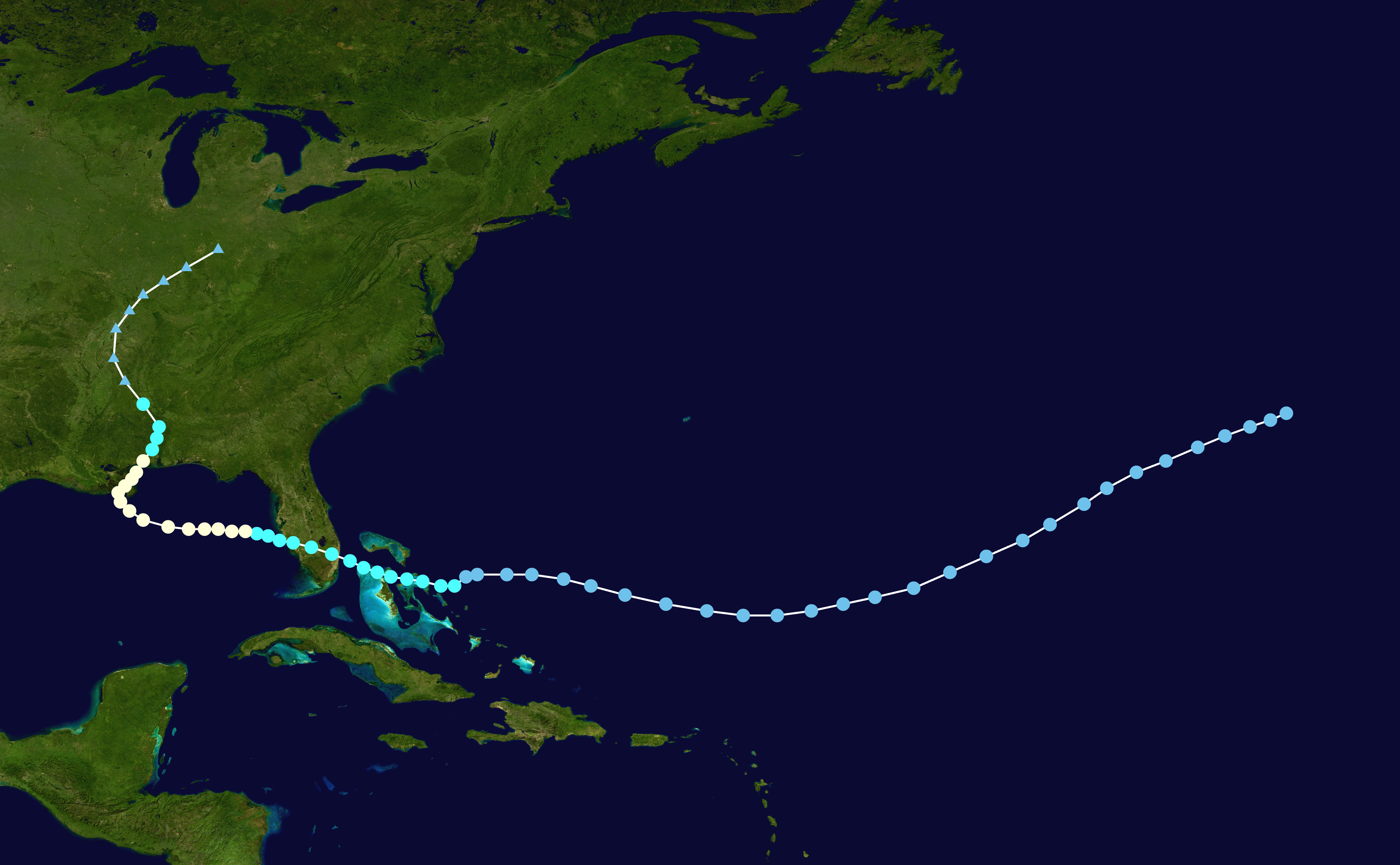
- Duration: August 2 – August 16
- Peak intensity: 90 mph (150 km/h) (1-min); 973 mbar (hPa)

The Louisiana Hurricane of 1901

A tropical depression developed about 615 mi (990 km) southwest of Flores Island in the Azores on August 2. Moving southwestward and later westward, the depression remained weak for several days, until strengthening into a tropical storm while approaching the Bahamas early on August 9. It then crossed through the islands and intensified only slightly. Late on August 10, the storm made landfall near Deerfield Beach, Florida. After reaching the Gulf of Mexico the next day, the storm continued to intensify and reached hurricane status on August 12. Early on August 13, the hurricane peaked with winds of 90 mph (145 km/h). After weakening slightly, the cyclone struck Louisiana late on August 14 and then Mississippi less than 24 hours later. The system weakened to a tropical storm early on August 16 and became extratropical several hours later. Thereafter, the remnants persisted until dissipating over Indiana late on August 18.

Along portions of the east coast of Florida, "considerable damage" was reported due to strong winds. In Alabama, trees were uprooted, houses were de-roofed, and chimneys collapsed in Mobile. Some areas of the city were also inundated with up to 18 inches (460 mm) of water due to storm tide. Several yachts, schooners, and ships were wrecked or sunk, resulting in at least $70,000 in damage. However, due to warnings by the Weather Bureau, the Mobile Chamber of Commerce estimated that several millions of dollars in damage was evaded. All towns along the coast of Mississippi "suffered seriously". In Louisiana, severe damage was reported at some towns due to strong winds and high tides. The community of Port Eads reported that only the lighthouse was not destroyed, while other sources state that an office building also remained standing. In New Orleans, overflowing levees inundated numerous streets. Outside the city, crops suffered severely, particularly rice. Overall, the storm caused 10–15 deaths and $1 million in damage.

=== Tropical Storm Five ===
- Tropical storm (SSHWS)
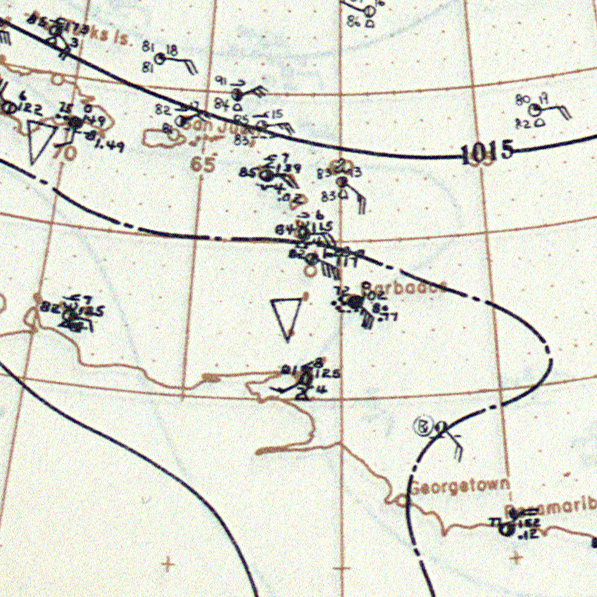
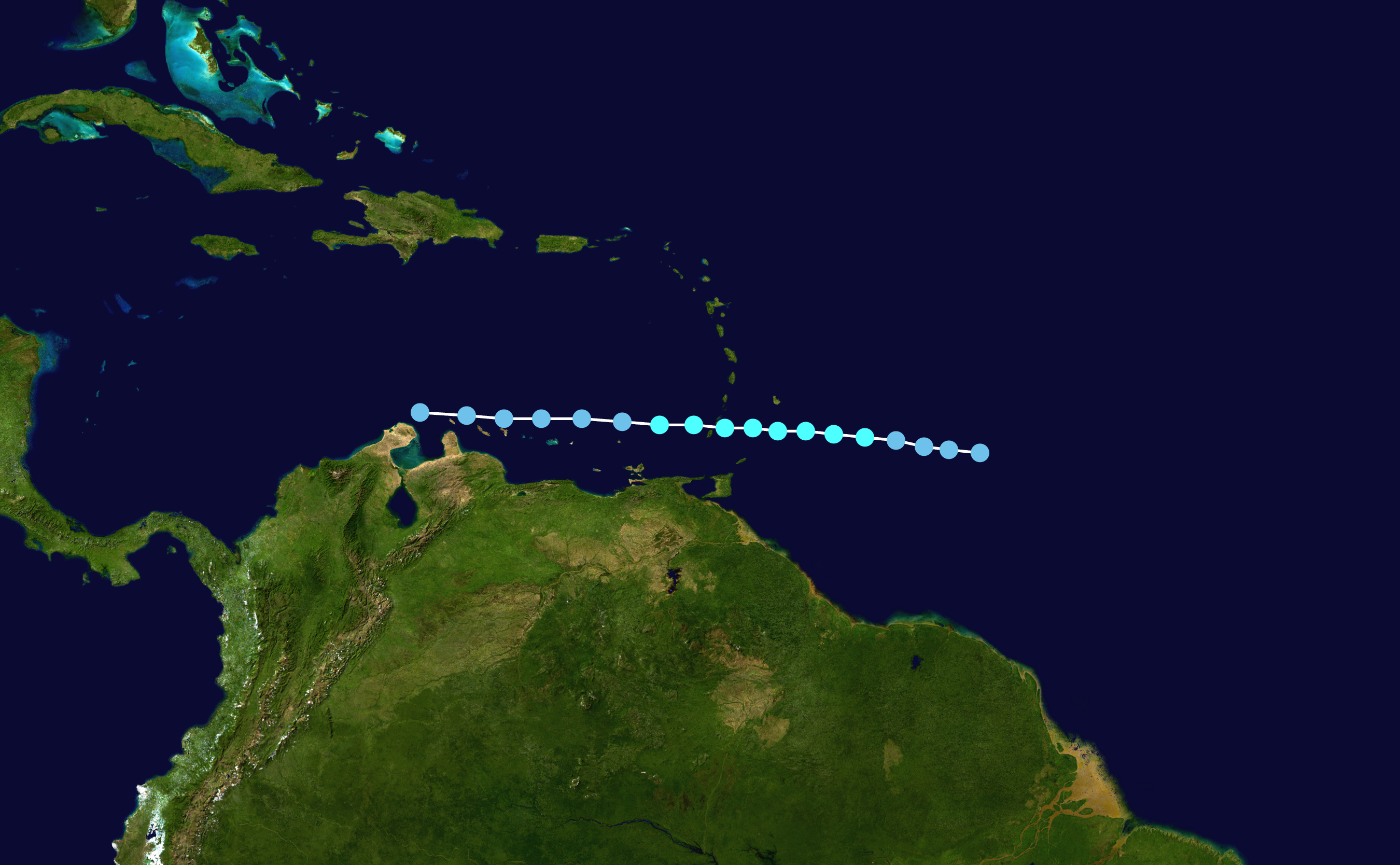
- Duration: August 18 – August 22
- Peak intensity: 50 mph (85 km/h) (1-min); <1012 mbar (hPa)

A tropical depression developed about 415 mi (670 km) south-southwest of Paramaribo, Suriname, on August 18. The system moved just north of due west throughout its duration and deepened into a tropical storm about 24 hours later. On August 20, the cyclone peaked with maximum sustained winds of 50 mph (80 km/h). Late on August 20, the storm passed through the Windward Islands just north of Grenada. According to Governor-in-Chief of the Windward Islands Robert Baxter Llewelyn, no damage occurred on Grenada. At Barbados, three lighters and a schooner, the Myosettis, were wrecked. The jetties and vessels at them were destroyed on Saint Vincent. After reaching the Caribbean, the cyclone began weakening, probably due to colder sea surface temperatures and the storm's proximity to South America. On August 21, the cyclone weakened to a tropical depression. Continuing westward, it dissipated at 18:00 UTC on the following day while situated about 65 mi (105 km) west-northwest of Aruba.

=== Hurricane Six ===
- Category 1 hurricane (SSHWS)
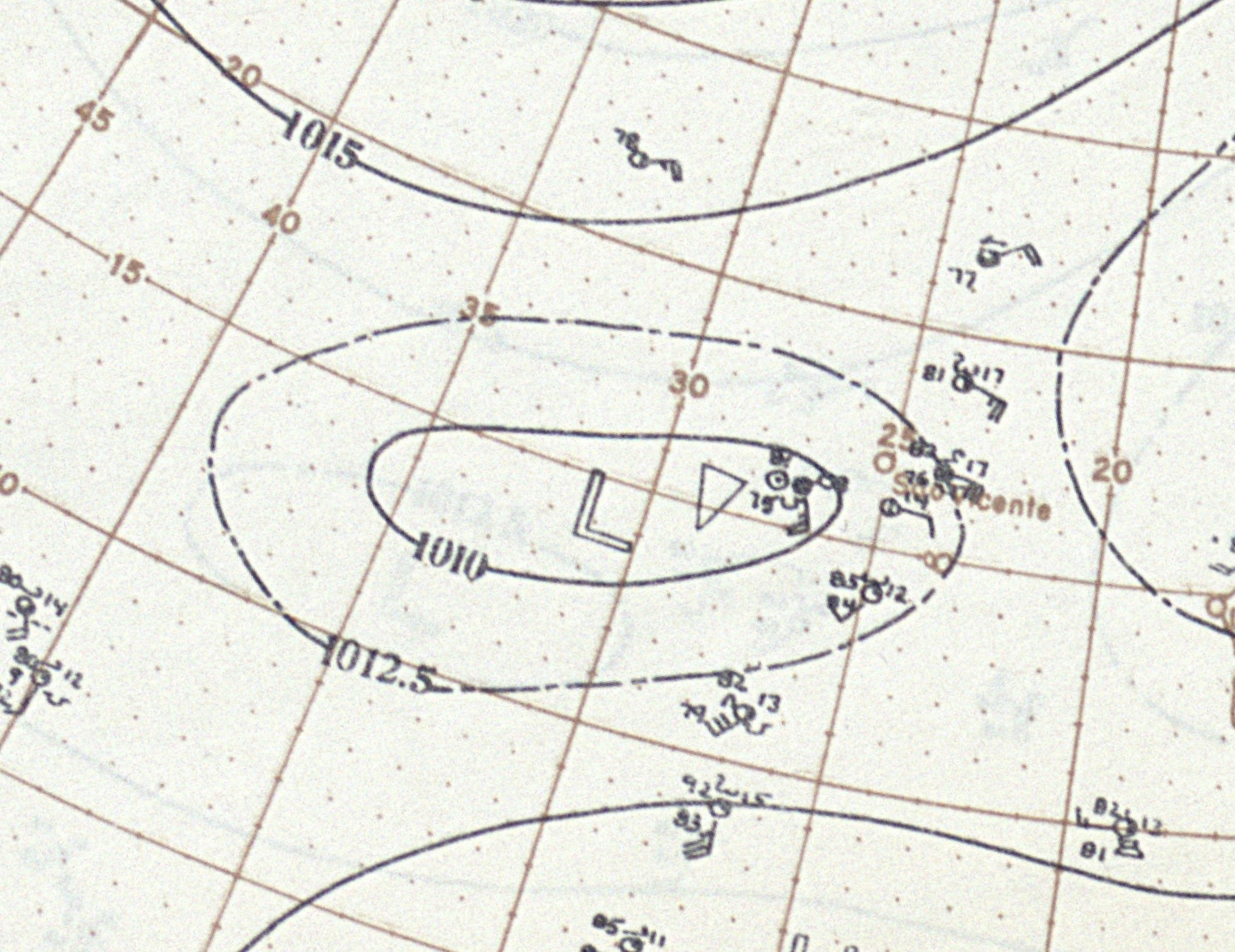
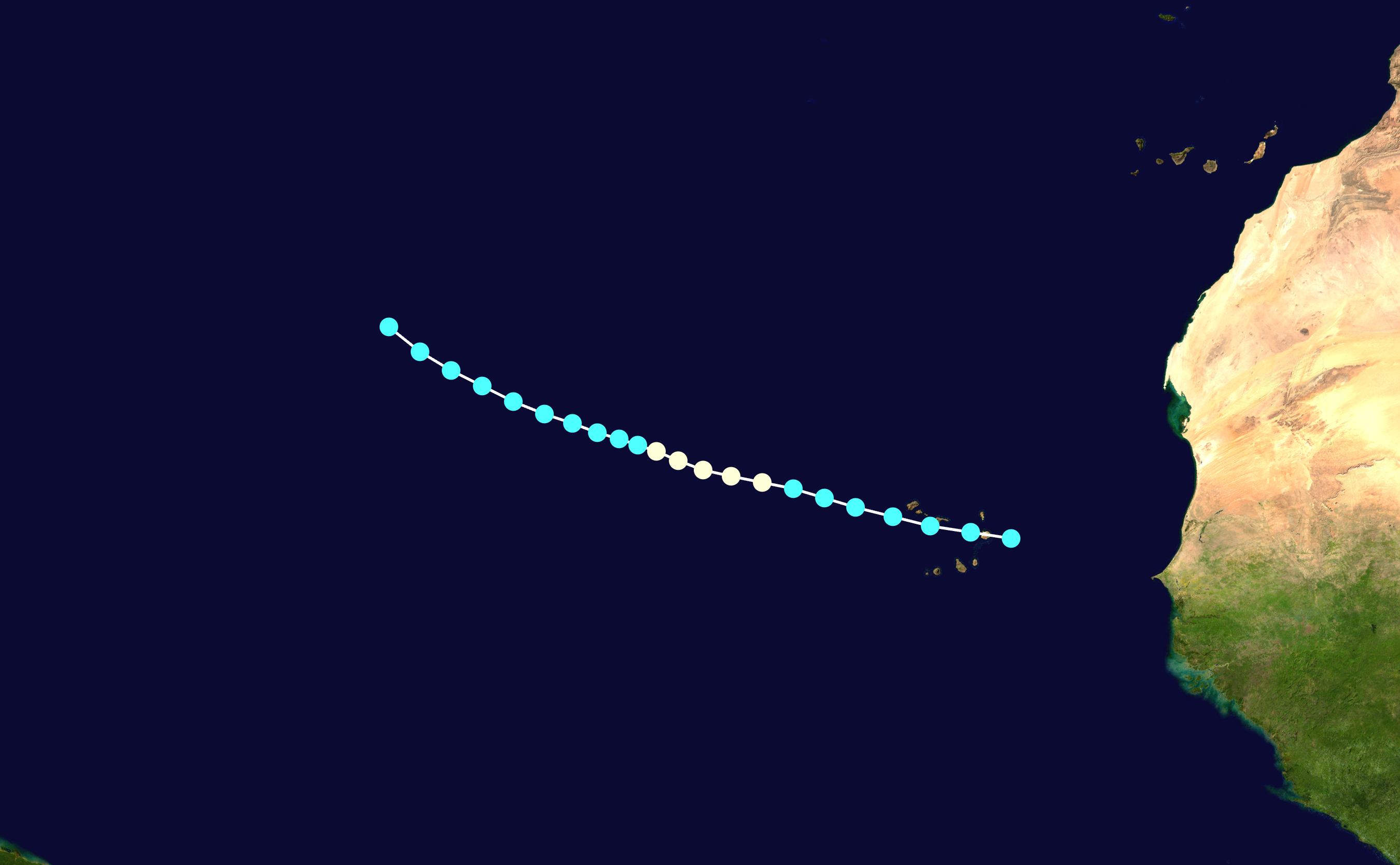
- Duration: August 25 – August 30
- Peak intensity: 80 mph (130 km/h) (1-min); <991 mbar (hPa)

A tropical storm was first observed just east of Boa Vista in the Cape Verde Islands on August 25. The storm moved west-northwest and struck the island with winds of 40 mph (65 km/h) a few hours later. After reaching the open Atlantic, the system intensified and reached hurricane status early on August 27. Later that day, it peaked with maximum sustained winds of 80 mph (130 km/h), an observation from the Norwegian barque Professor Johnson. The hurricane began weakening early on August 28 and fell to tropical storm intensity shortly thereafter. By late on August 30, the storm was analysed to have dissipated about 1,145 mi (1,845 km) northwest of Santo Antão in the Cape Verde Islands.

=== Hurricane Seven ===
- Category 2 hurricane (SSHWS)
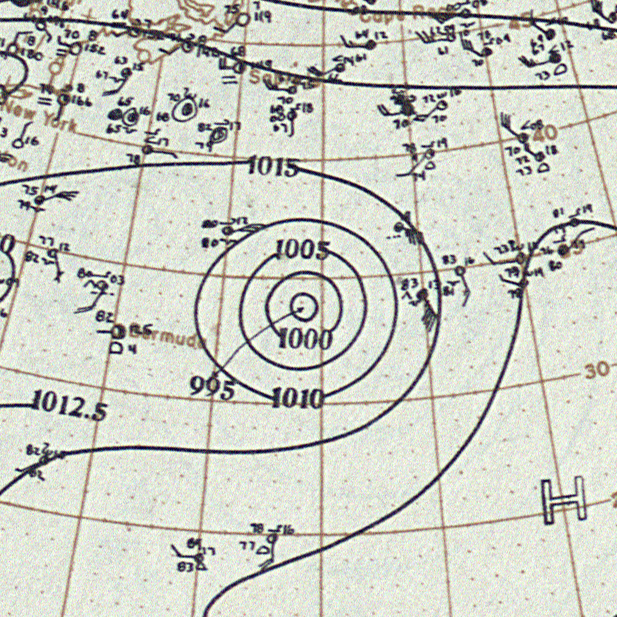
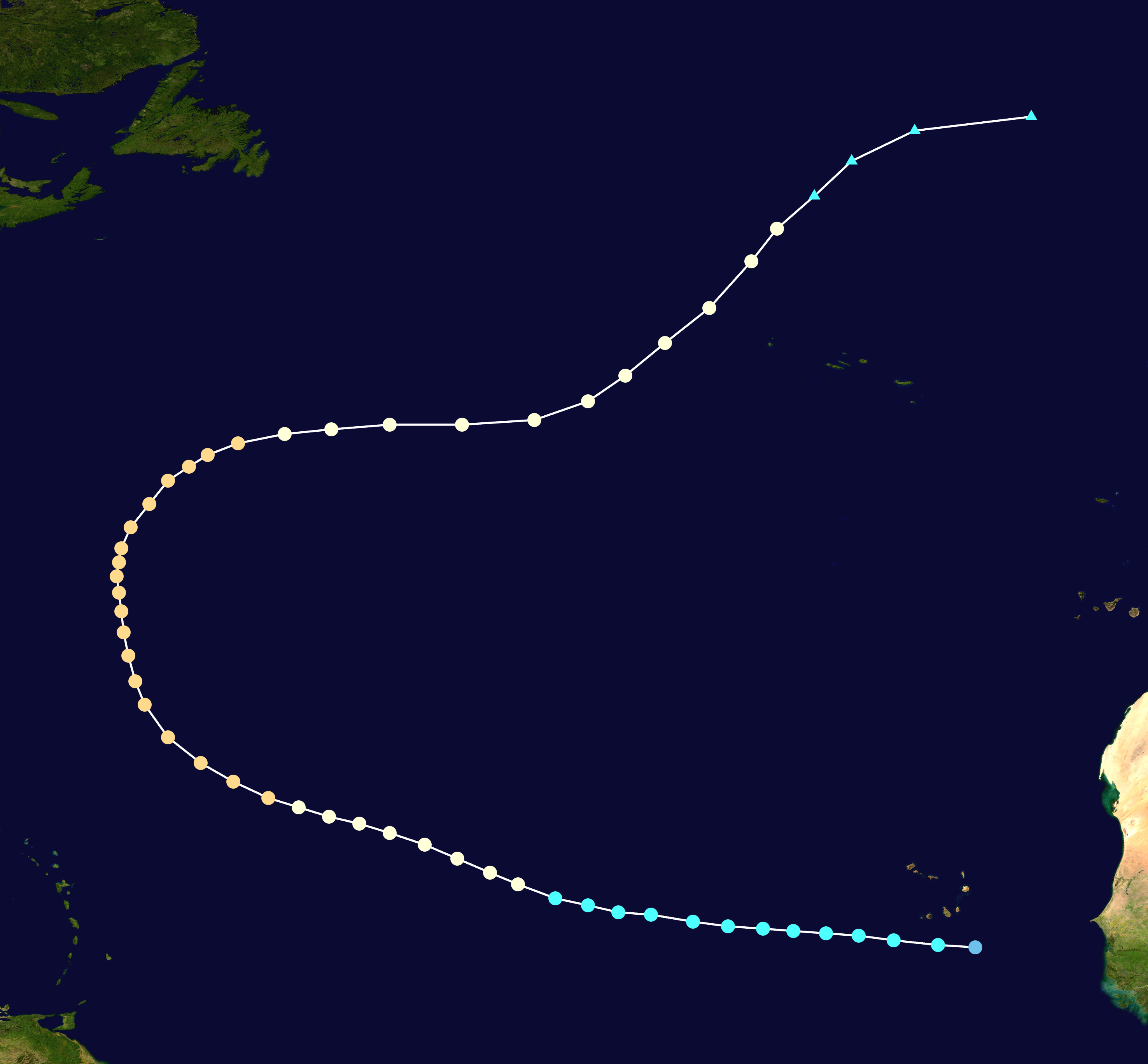
- Duration: August 29 – September 10
- Peak intensity: 105 mph (165 km/h) (1-min); 991 mbar (hPa)

Historical weather maps indicate that a tropical depression developed about 115 mi (185 km) southeast of Praia, Cape Verde, early on August 29. Six hours later, the depression intensified into a tropical storm. While passing south of Cape Verde on August 29, the storm brought rough seas to the islands, sinking two vessels. Strong winds and torrential rainfall damaged coffee and sugar cane crops and houses. Livestock and people were killed. Thereafter, the storm slowly strengthened while continuing westward into the open Atlantic for a few days, until a slight curve to the west-northwest by August 31. The system intensified into a Category 1 hurricane around 12:00 UTC on September 1.

Continuing to deepen, the cyclone became a Category 2 hurricane on September 3. By the following day, it turned northward and peaked with maximum sustained winds of 105 mph (170 km/h). The hurricane would maintain this intensity for a few days, until curving northeastward on September 6, at which time it began to slowly weaken. By September 8, the storm turned to the east and fell to Category 1 status. Around this time, a barometric pressure of 991 mbar (29.3 inHg) was observed, the lowest recorded in relation to the cyclone. The hurricane soon recurved back to the northeast and accelerated. Late on September 10, the system transitioned into an extratropical cyclone while located about 430 mi (690 km) north-northeast of Corvo Island in the Azores. The remnants moved quickly northeastward and dissipated southwest of Ireland on September 11.

=== Hurricane Eight ===
- Category 1 hurricane (SSHWS)
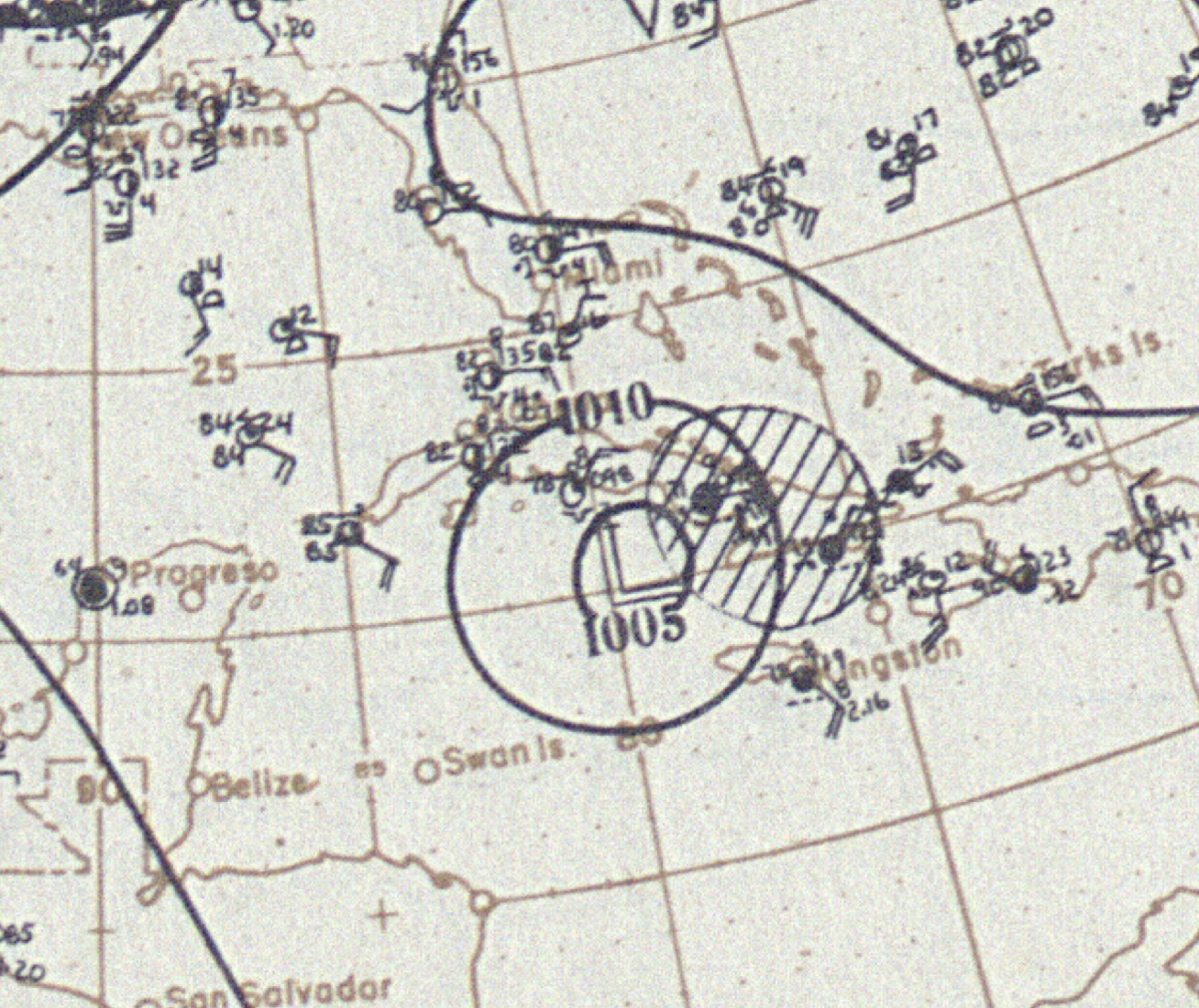
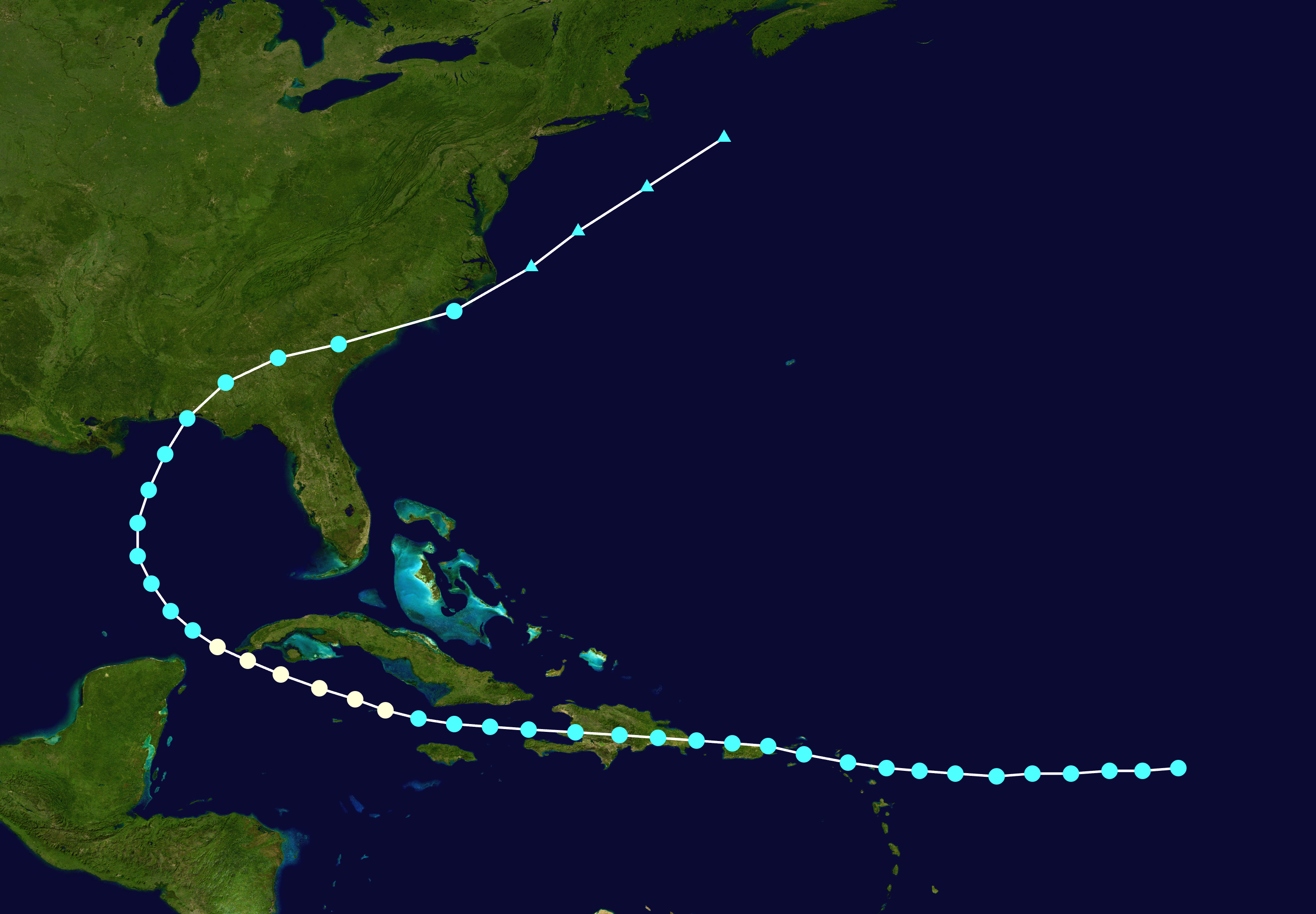
- Duration: September 9 – September 18
- Peak intensity: 80 mph (130 km/h) (1-min); <1001 mbar (hPa)

Hurricane San Vicente of 1901
A tropical storm was first observed about 700 mi (1,100 km) east of Guadeloupe early on September 9. The system tracked generally westward and deepened slowly. On September 11, the grazed several islands of the northern Lesser Antilles, including Barbuda, Saint Barthélemy, and Saba. Early the following day, the cyclone struck Puerto Rico with winds of 60 mph (95 km/h), several hours before making made landfall in Dominican Republic near Punta Cana at the same intensity. The storm weakened while crossing Hispaniola, before emerging into the Caribbean Sea early on September 13. While passing to the south of Cuba, the system intensified, becoming a hurricane on September 14 near Cayman Brac. Early the following day, the storm peaked with sustained winds of 80 mph (130 km/h) and a minimum pressure of 1,001 mbar (29.6 inHg), the latter was measured by a ship while the former was estimated during reanalysis. The hurricane soon curved west-northwestward and later passed near Cape San Antonio, Cuba, on September 15. Upon entering the Gulf of Mexico, the cyclone weakened to a tropical storm. By September 17, it turned north-northeastward and made landfall in Fort Walton Beach, Florida, at 20:00 UTC with winds of 60 mph (95 km/h). The system then moved rapidly northeastward and became extratropical about 75 mi (120 km) east of Hatteras Island in North Carolina late on September 18. The remnants dissipated offshore New England about 24 hours later.

In Puerto Rico, the storm was known as San Vicente. Rainfall peaked at 10.43 in (265 mm) in San Salvador, while winds in San Juan reached 52 mph (84 km/h). Minor damage occurred to citrus and coffee crops, while bananas suffered severe losses. A telegraph report from Haiti indicated heavy rainstorms and strong winds in the vicinity of Cap-Haïtien. In Cuba, several ships were beached along the bay at Santiago de Cuba. A few streets in Batabanó were inundated with at least 3 ft (0.91 m) of water. The system caused a significant amount of rain across Georgia and the Carolinas, with the maximum amount reported 11.4 in (290 mm) at Americus, Georgia. Offshore Virginia, rough seas resulted in the wrecking or sinking of several vessels. The schooner Idle Times collided with a Pennsylvania Railroad barge, killing the schooner's captain. Four sailors drowned offshore Ocean View. At Newport News, 3.32 in (84 mm) of rain fell in a period of 24 hours, which became the highest daily precipitation total for the month of September. Significant damage occurred in the Maryland city of Braddock, with few homes, barns, or farm buildings not sustaining any impact. In Poplar Terrace, a water tank was swept away from a house. The hospital in Montevue was partially deroofed. Twelve barns were overturned in Liberty and corn crops were ruined. At Saint Pierre, the schooner J. W. Roberts was beached, drowning three people.

=== Tropical Storm Nine ===
- Tropical storm (SSHWS)
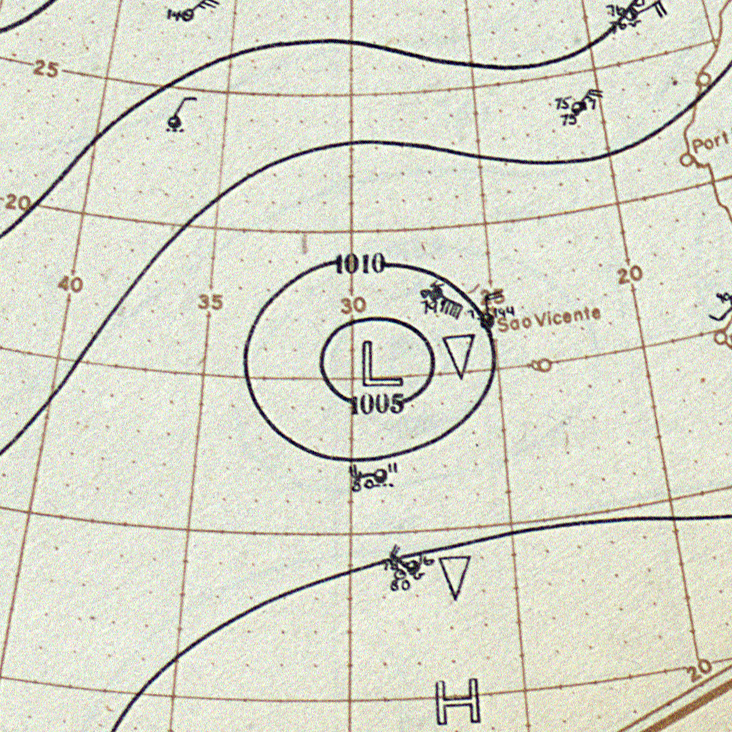
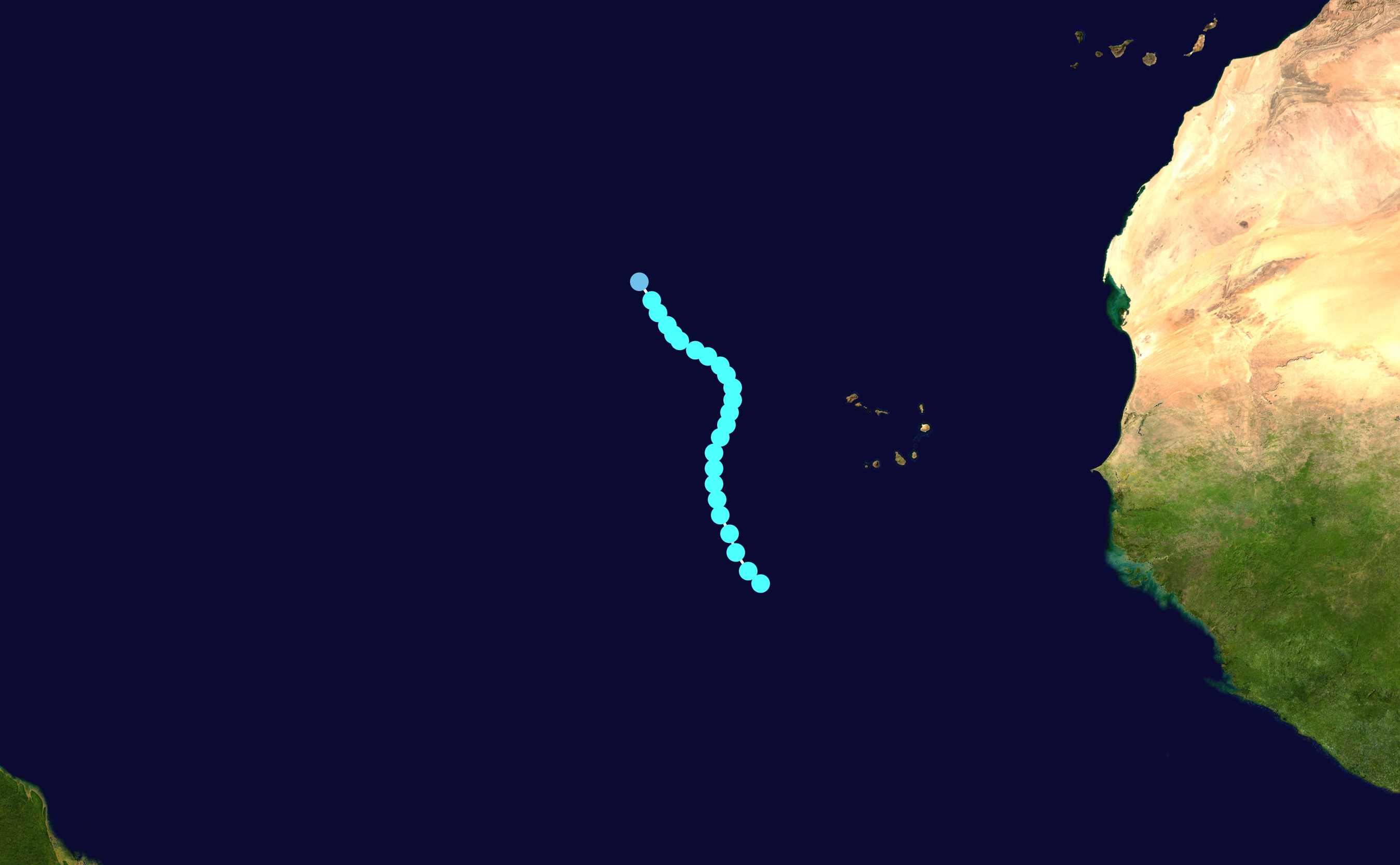
- Duration: September 12 – September 17
- Peak intensity: 60 mph (95 km/h) (1-min);

Ships reports and historical weather maps indicated that the storm was first observed early on September 12, while located about 345 mi (555 km) southwest of Brava in the Cape Verde Islands. The system strengthened slowly while moving north-northwestward and later north-northeastward across the eastern Atlantic. Early on September 14, the cyclone peaked with maximum sustained winds of 60 mph (95 km/h). Thereafter, it curved northwestward and began to deteriorate very slowly, weakening to a tropical depression late on September 17. Soon after, the system dissipated about 505 mi (815 km) northwest of Santo Antão.

=== Tropical Storm Ten ===
- Tropical storm (SSHWS)
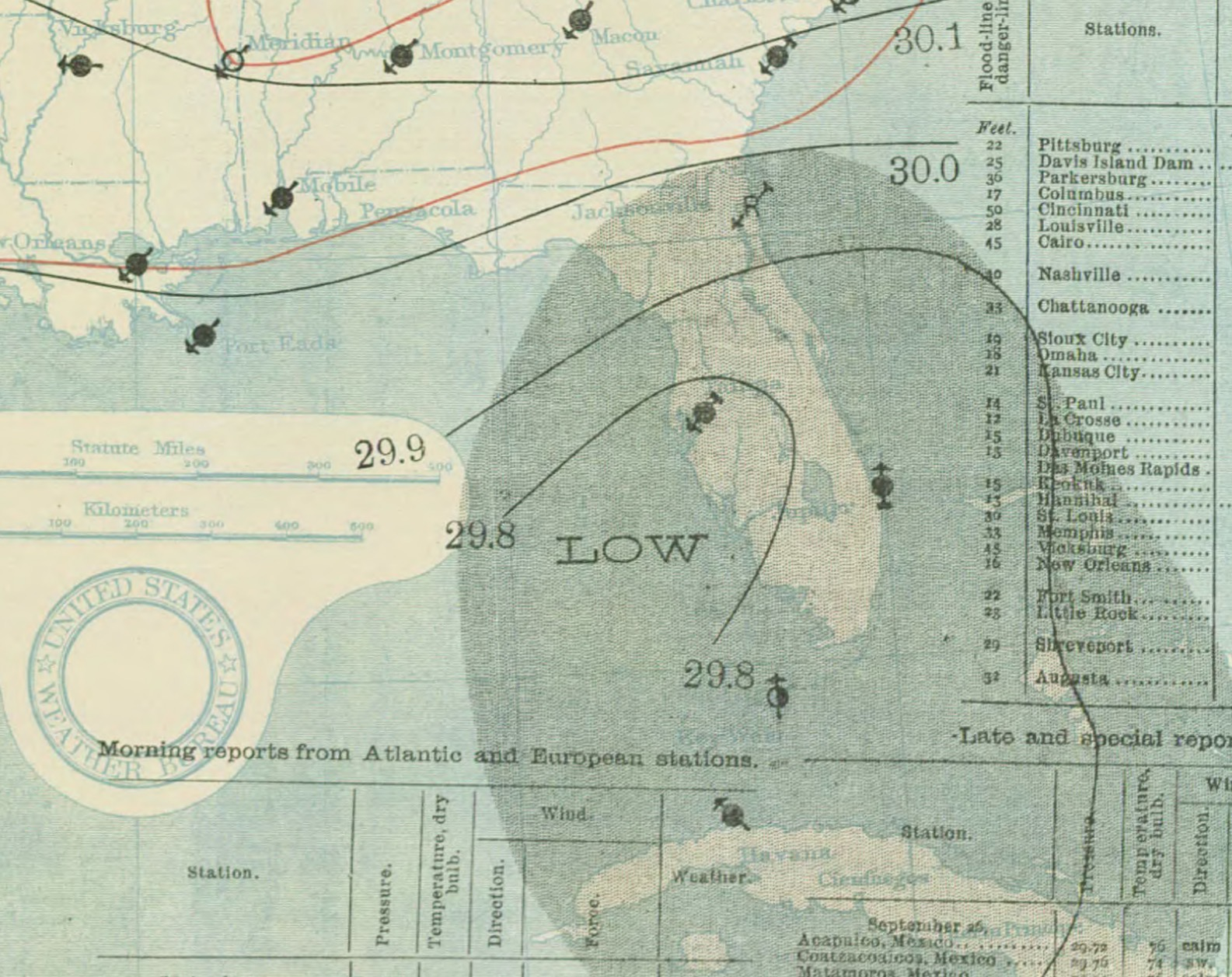
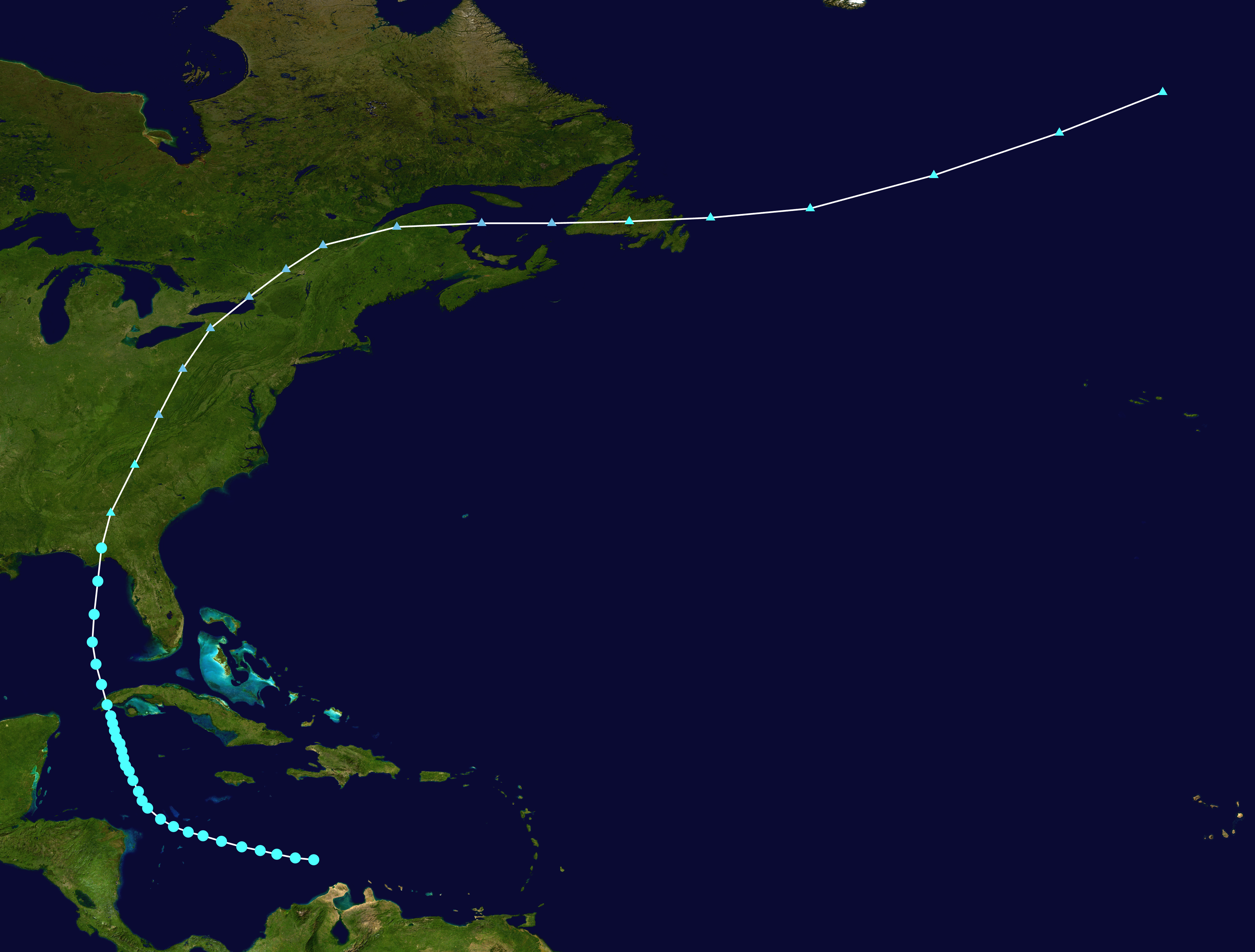
- Duration: September 21 – September 28
- Peak intensity: 50 mph (85 km/h) (1-min);

Early on September 21, the tenth tropical storm of the season was first observed about 125 mi (200 km) northwest of the Guajira Peninsula, according to data from ships and historical weather maps. Initially the storm moved west-northwestward, before curving to the north-northwest over the northwestern Caribbean Sea early on September 25. Later that day, the cyclone began to intensify, after possibly maintaining the same intensity since September 21. The storm peaked with maximum sustained winds of 50 mph (80 km/h), several hours before making landfall in western Pinar del Río Province in Cuba around 18:00 UTC. Some areas of Cuba experienced heavy rainfall, particularly Batabanó, where several streets were inundated.

Late on September 25, the storm emerged into the Gulf of Mexico. The system soon curved north-northeastward and began to accelerate and slowly weaken. At 03:00 UTC on September 28, it made landfall in modern-day Lanark Village, Florida, just east of Carrabelle, with winds of 45 mph (70 km/h). The cyclone rapidly lost tropical characteristics and transitioned into an extratropical cyclone over Georgia around 12:00 UTC. However, the remnants lasted until October 2, after crossing the Eastern United States and Atlantic Canada, and then dissipating southeast of Greenland. The storm brought fairly strong winds to Florida and the southern portions of the East Coast of the United States.

=== Tropical depression ===
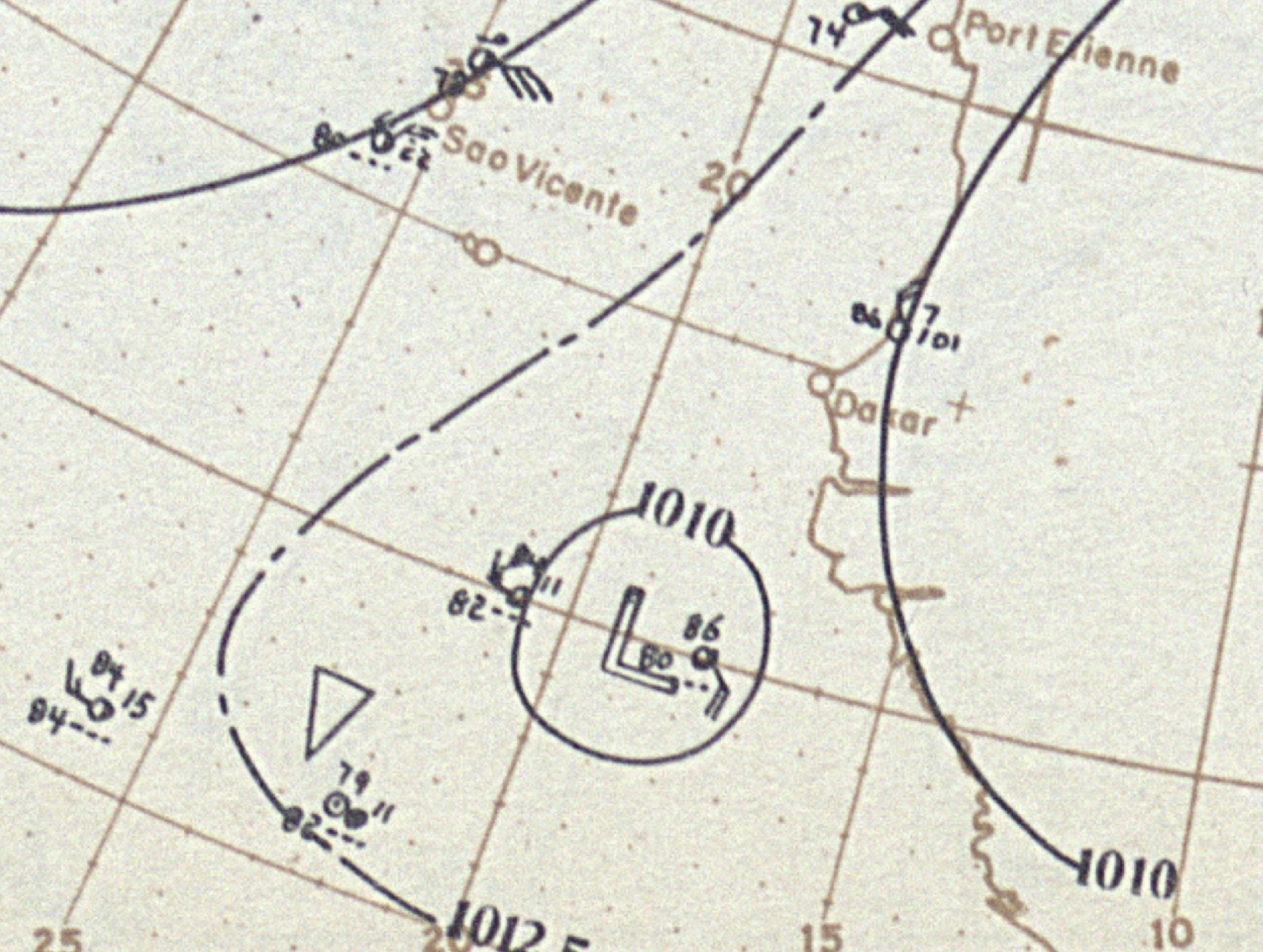
Weather map of the tropical depression on October 4

Based on historical weather maps, a tropical depression formed offshore Guinea on October 4. The depression moved west-northwestward and may have intensified into a tropical storm, but data was sparse and inconclusive. It likely dissipated by the following day, as weather maps do not indicate a closed low-pressure area thereafter.

=== Tropical Storm Eleven ===
- Tropical storm (SSHWS)
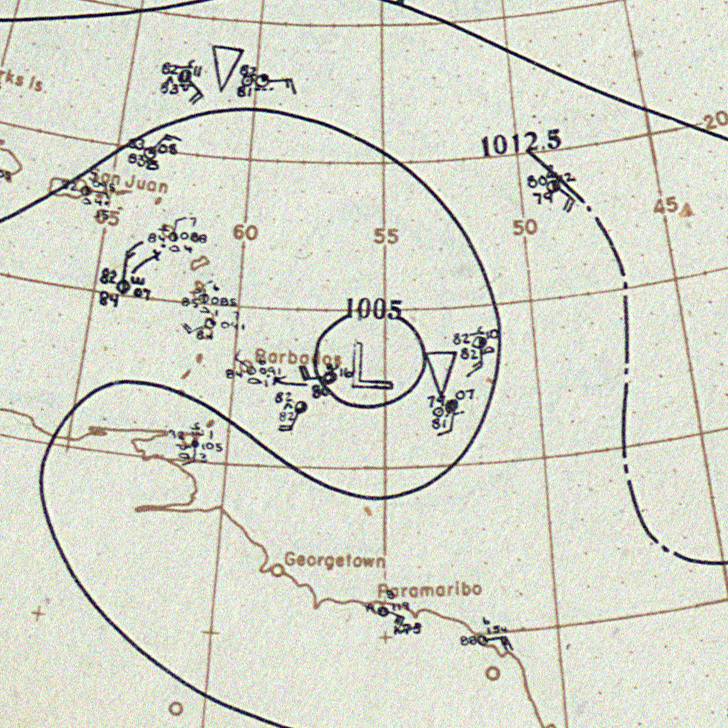
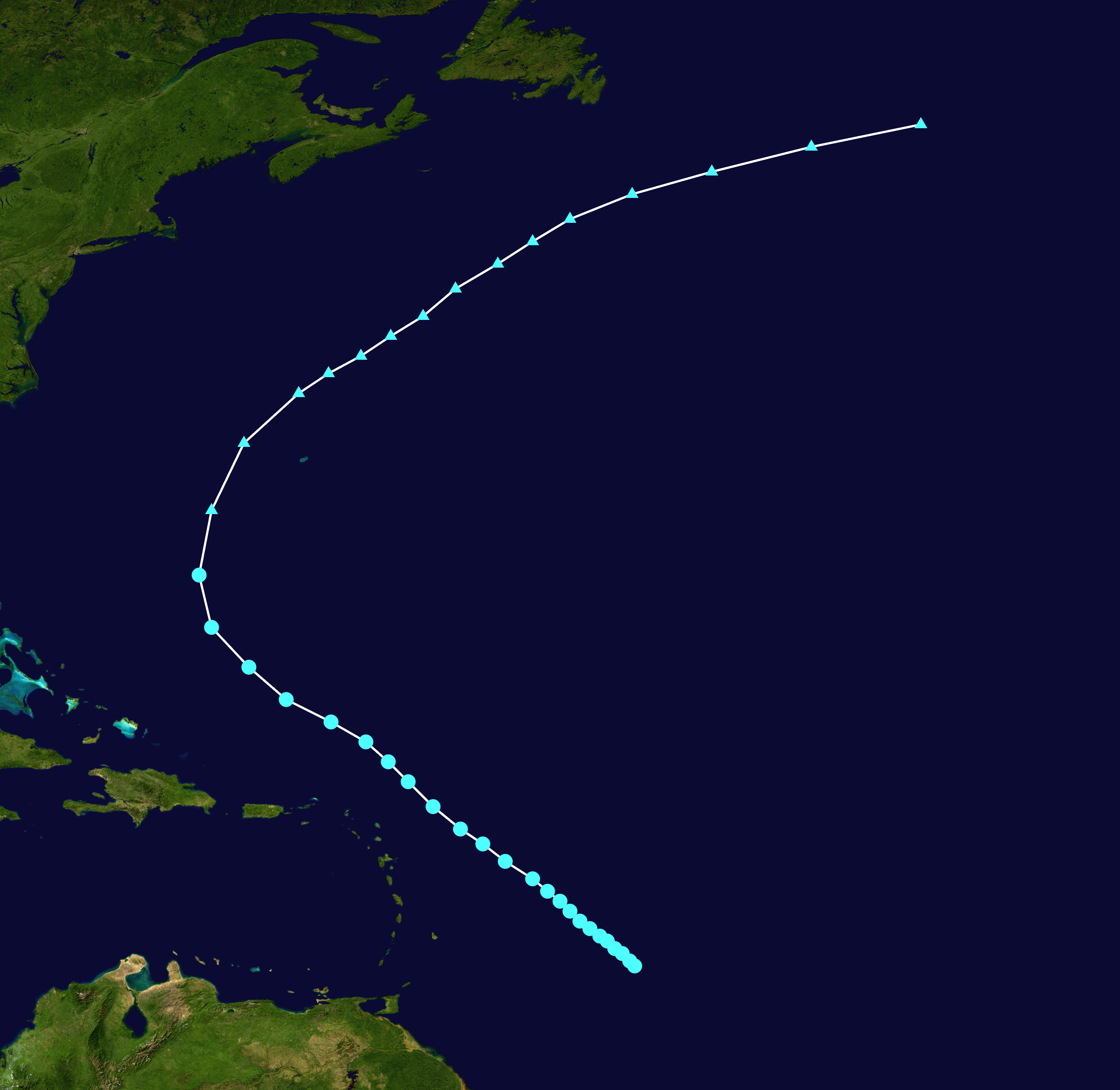
- Duration: October 5 – October 10
- Peak intensity: 70 mph (110 km/h) (1-min);

This storm was first observed by ships about 500 mi (800 km) north-northeast of Paramaribo early on October 5. Initially drifting northwestward, the storm gradually accelerated while deepening slowly. The cyclone peaked with maximum sustained winds of 70 mph (115 km/h) on October 7, based on ship observations. By the following day, the storm began to weaken and slowly lose tropical characteristics. The system curved northward on October 10 and transitioned into an extratropical cyclone later that day, while situated about 255 mi (410 km) west-southwest of Bermuda. The remnants persisted for a few days while moving northeast, until dissipating well northwest of the Azores on October 14.

=== Tropical Storm Twelve ===
- Tropical storm (SSHWS)
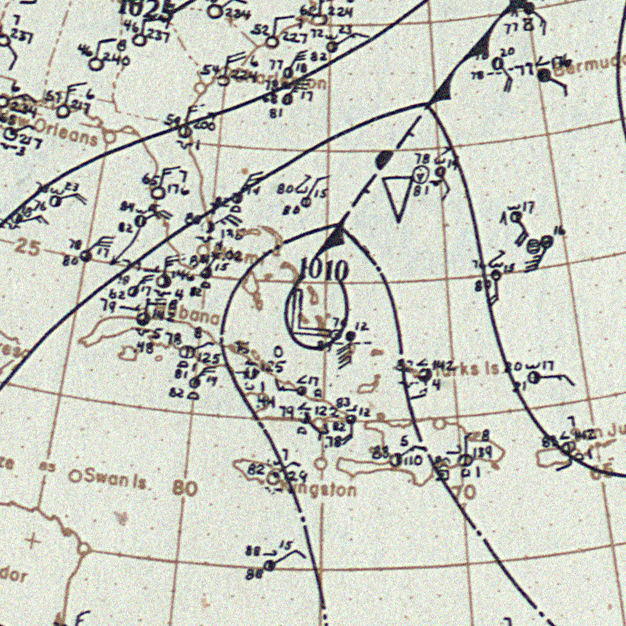
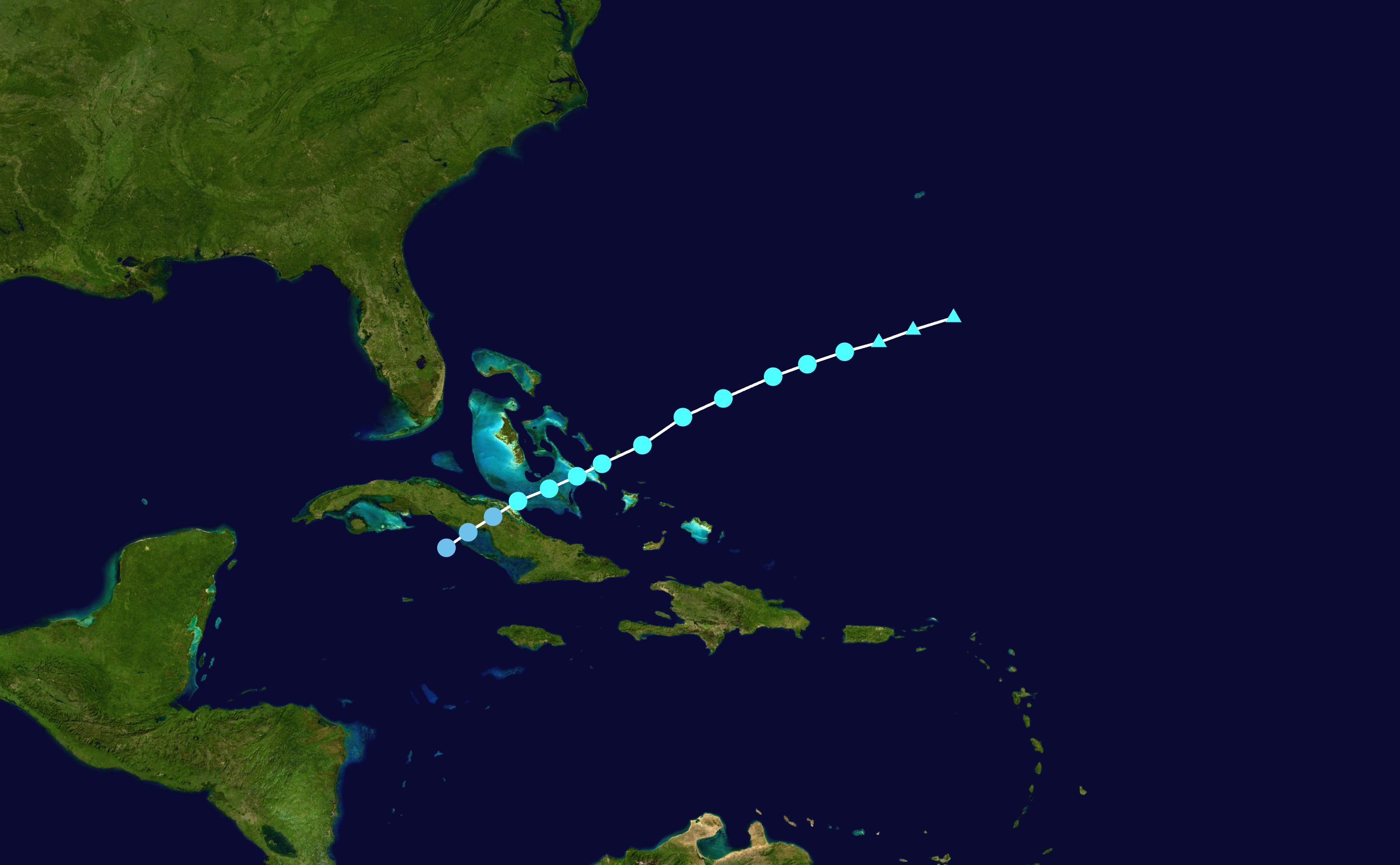
- Duration: October 15 – October 18
- Peak intensity: 60 mph (95 km/h) (1-min);

A tropical depression formed about 50 mi (80 km) south of Trinidad, Cuba, on October 15. The depression moved northeastward without strengthening and struck Sancti Spíritus Province shortly thereafter. A few cities observed rainfall. Upon reaching the southwestern Atlantic Ocean late on October 15, the depression intensified into a tropical storm. Further deepening occurred as the storm moved northeastward into the Bahamas, where it made landfall on or brushed Long Island, Rum Cay, and San Salvador Island on October 16. That day around 12:00 UTC, the cyclone peaked with maximum sustained winds of 60 mph (95 km/h). Thereafter, the system began weakening and losing tropical characteristics, transitioning into an extratropical cyclone early on October 18 while located about 330 mi (530 km) south-southwest of Bermuda. Several hours later, the remnants dissipated.

=== Hurricane Thirteen ===
- Category 1 hurricane (SSHWS)
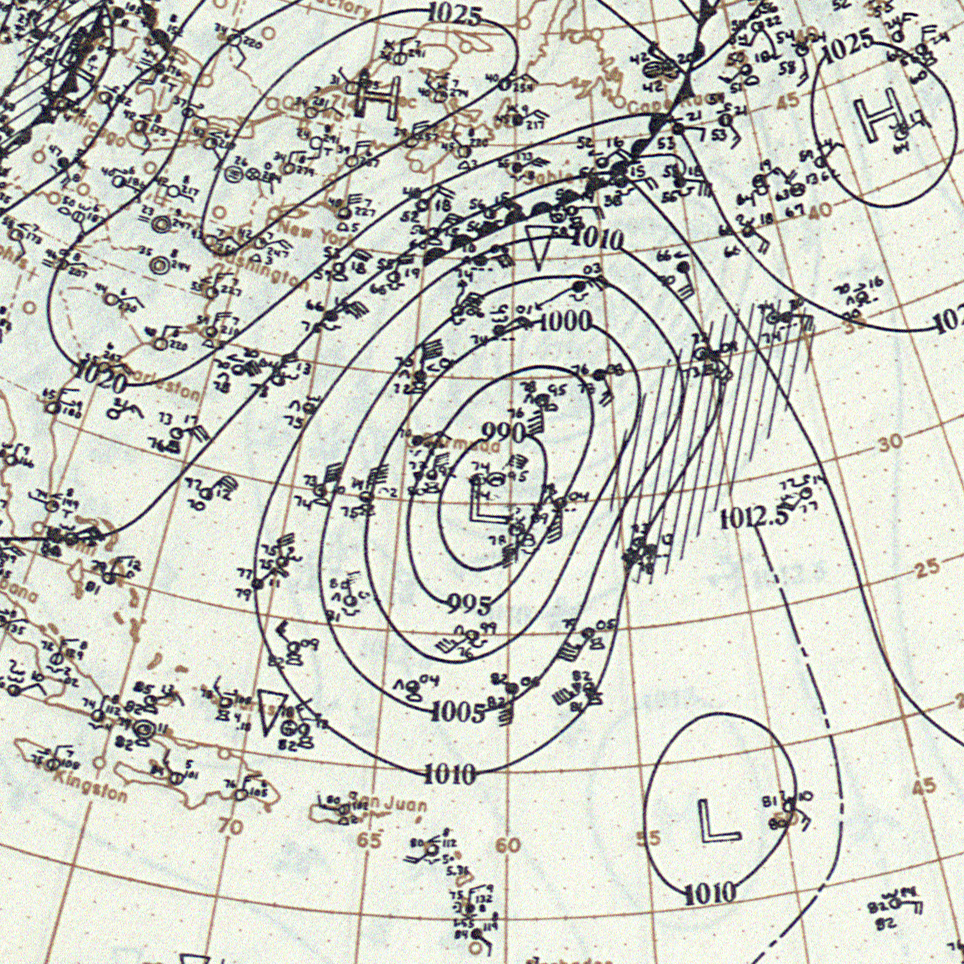
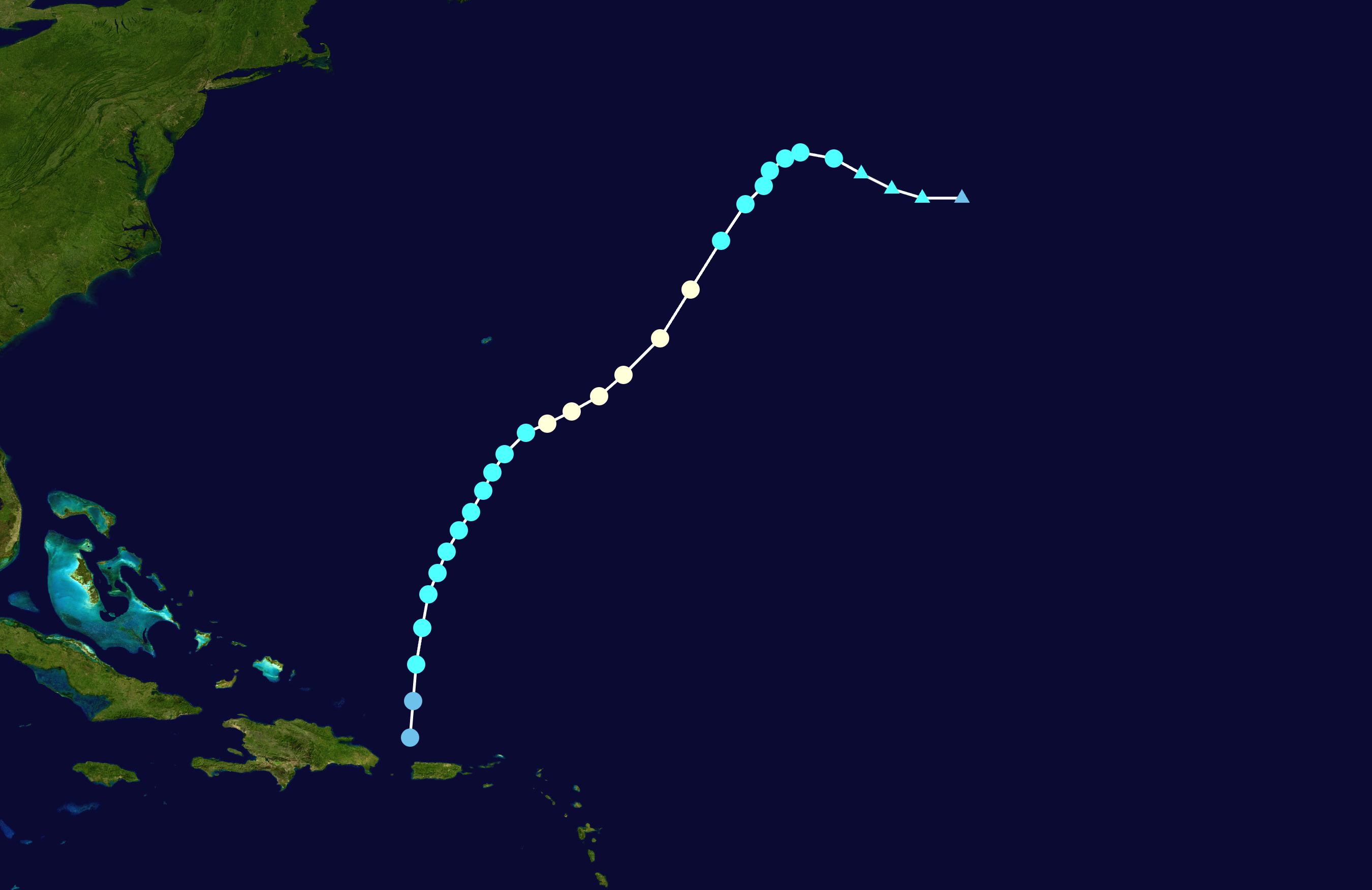
- Duration: October 30 – November 5
- Peak intensity: 80 mph (130 km/h) (1-min); 989 mbar (hPa)

The final storm of the season developed as a tropical depression about 55 mi (90 km) north-northwest of Aguadilla, Puerto Rico, on October 30. Moving north-northeastward, the depression became a tropical storm by early on October 31. Later that day, the storm curved to the northeast. During the next few days, further intensification occurred, with the cyclone reaching hurricane status late on October 28. Shortly thereafter, the storm attained its peak intensity with maximum sustained winds of 80 mph (130 km/h) and a minimum barometric pressure of 989 mbar (29.2 inHg); the latter was observed by a ship, while the former was estimated using the subtropical wind-pressure relationship.

While passing southeast of Bermuda, the storm ruined crops and caused considerable damage to some buildings. The system began to deteriorate gradually after peak intensity, weakening to a tropical storm early on November 4. Early the following day, the cyclone curved east-southeastward. By 00:00 UTC on November 6, it transitioned into an extratropical cyclone while located about 575 mi (925 km) southeast of Sable Island. The remnants continued east-southeastward until dissipating late on November 6.

== Season effects ==
This is a table of all of the storms that have formed in the 1901 Atlantic hurricane season. It includes their duration, names, landfall(s)–denoted by bold location names – damages, and death totals. Deaths in parentheses are additional and indirect (an example of an indirect death would be a traffic accident), but were still related to that storm. Damage and deaths include totals while the storm was extratropical, a wave, or a low, and all of the damage figures are in 1901 USD.

Saffir–Simpson scale
TD	TS	C1	C2	C3	C4	C5

1901 North Atlantic tropical cyclone season statistics
Storm name	Dates active	Storm category at peak intensity	Max 1-min wind mph (km/h)	Min. press. (mbar)	Areas affected	Damage (US$)	Deaths	Ref(s).
One	June 11–15	Tropical storm	40 (65)	1010	Cuba, Southern United States (Florida), Illinois	Minor	None	
Two	July 1–10	Tropical storm	70 (110)	1007	Windward Islands, Greater Antilles (Cuba), Texas	Unknown	14	
Three	July 4–13	Category 1 hurricane	80 (130)	983	Leeward Islands (Martinique), Lesser Antilles, Dominican Republic, Virginia, North Carolina	Unknown	1	
Four	August 2–16	Category 1 hurricane	90 (150)	973	Bahamas, Southern United States (Florida, Louisiana, Mississippi), Indiana	$1 million	10–15	
Five	August 18–22	Tropical storm	50 (85)	1012	Windward Islands, ABC islands	Minor	None	
Six	August 25–30	Category 1 hurricane	80 (130)	991	Cape Verde	Minor	None	
Seven	August 29–September 10	Category 2 hurricane	105 (165)	991	Cape Verde	Unknown	2	
Eight	September 9–18	Category 1 hurricane	80 (130)	991	Lesser Antilles (Puerto Rico), Great Antilles (Dominican Republic), Southeastern United States (Florida), Mid-Atlantic, Newfoundland, Saint Pierre and Miquelon	Unknown	8	
Nine	September 12–17	Tropical storm	60 (95)	Unknown	None	None	None	
Ten	September 21–28	Tropical storm	50 (85)	Unknown	Cuba, Eastern United States (Florida), Atlantic Canada	Minor	None	
Depression	October 4–5	Tropical depression	Unknown	1010	None	None	None	
Eleven	October 5–10	Tropical storm	70 (110)	Unknown	None	None	None	
Twelve	October 15–18	Tropical storm	60 (95)	Unknown	Cuba, Bahamas	None	None	
Thirteen	October 30–November 5	Category 1 hurricane	80 (130)	989	None	None	None	
Season aggregates
14 systems	June 11 – November 5		90 (150)	936		1	35–40	

== See also ==
- Atlantic hurricane reanalysis project
- Tropical cyclone observation
- 1900–1940 South Pacific cyclone seasons
- 1900–1950 South-West Indian Ocean cyclone seasons
- 1900s Australian region cyclone seasons
