= Surgidero de Batabanó Lighthouse =

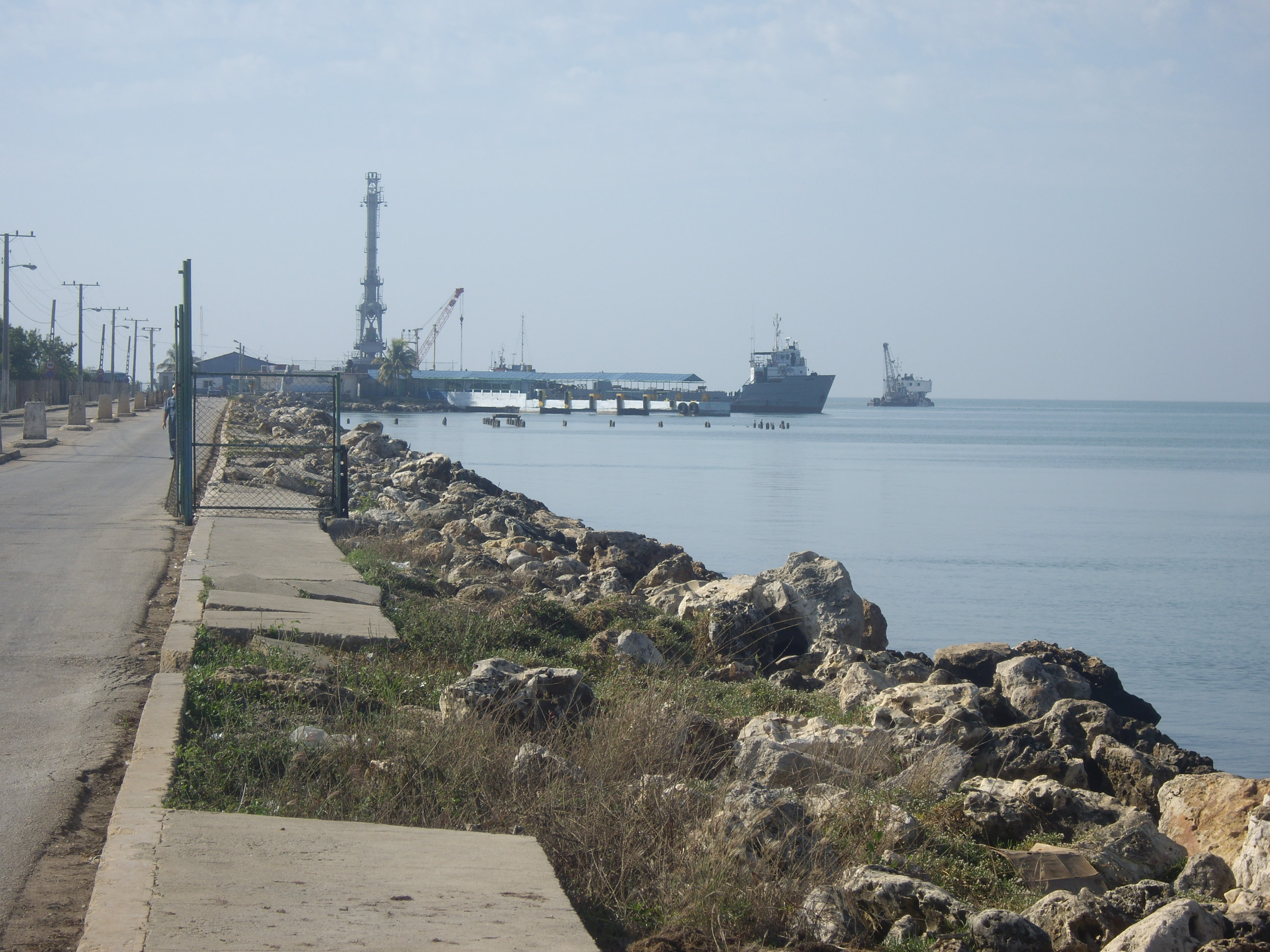
- Location: Surgidero de Batabanó; Cuba
- Coordinates: 22°41′15.7″N 82°17′51.8″W

Tower
- Constructed: 1847 (first)
- Height: 28 metres (92 ft)
- Shape: small lantern structure atop a water tank
- Markings: white water tank
- Power source: mains electricity

Light
- Focal height: 31 metres (102 ft)
- Range: 7 nautical miles (13 km; 8.1 mi)
- Characteristic: Fl W 10s.
- Cuba no.: CU-1165

Surgidero de Batabanó Lighthouse is a Cuban lighthouse located in Surgidero de Batabanó, a village and the port of Batabanó, Mayabeque Province.

== See also ==
- List of lighthouses in Cuba
