= Nestor Cortes =

Cuban-American baseball player (born 1994)

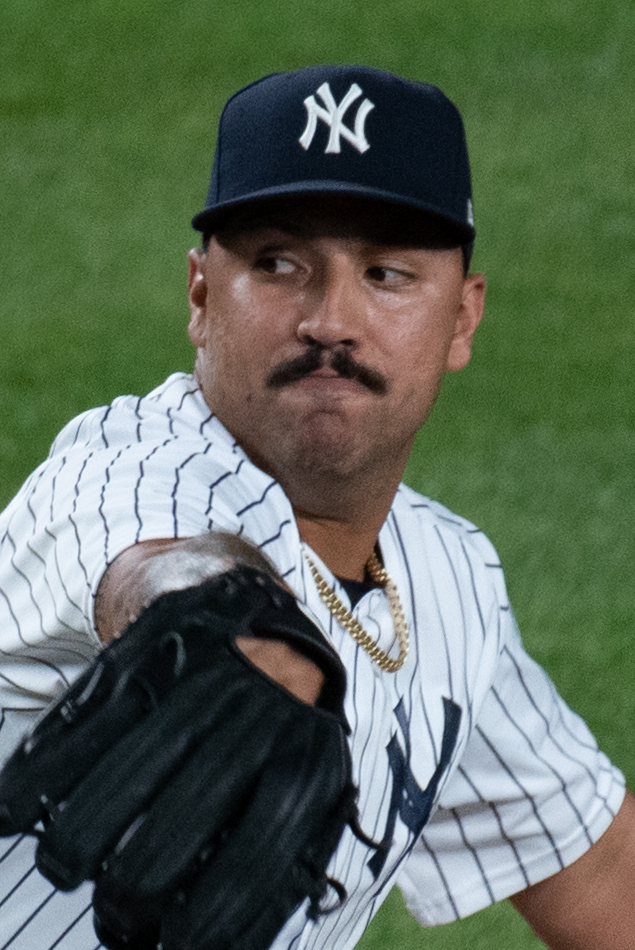
- Cortes Jr. with the New York Yankees in 2021

Free agent
- Pitcher
- Born: December 10, 1994 (age 31); Surgidero de Batabanó, Cuba
- Bats: Right Throws: Left

MLB debut
- March 31, 2018, for the Baltimore Orioles

MLB statistics (through 2025 season)
- Win–loss record: 35–25
- Earned run average: 3.94
- Strikeouts: 604
- Stats at Baseball Reference

Teams
- Baltimore Orioles (2018); New York Yankees (2019); Seattle Mariners (2020); New York Yankees (2021–2024); Milwaukee Brewers (2025); San Diego Padres (2025)

Career highlights and awards
- All-Star (2022); Pitched an immaculate inning on April 17, 2022

Nestor Cortes Jr. (born December 10, 1994), nicknamed "Nasty Nestor" is a Cuban-American professional baseball pitcher who is a free agent. He has previously played in MLB for the Baltimore Orioles, New York Yankees, Seattle Mariners, Milwaukee Brewers, and San Diego Padres.

The Yankees selected Cortes in the 36th round of the 2013 MLB draft. Taken by the Orioles in the Rule 5 draft after the 2017 season, he made his MLB debut with them in 2018 before returning to the Yankees. Cortes pitched for the Yankees in 2019 and the Mariners in 2020, rejoining the Yankees in 2021 and establishing himself in their starting rotation. He was an MLB All-Star in 2022. After the 2024 season, the Yankees traded Cortes to the Brewers. After two starts in April 2025, Cortes was injured, and the Brewers traded him to the Padres at the end of July. He signed with the Phillies in August 2026.

== Early life ==
Cortes was born in Surgidero de Batabanó, Cuba. When he was seven months old, his father, Nestor Cortes Sr., won the visa lottery, and they relocated to the United States in the city of Hialeah, Florida. His father had been sentenced to one year in prison after a failed attempt to defect from Cuba in 1992. Nestor Sr. met his wife, Yuslaidy, the following year. Nestor Sr. drove a forklift, and Yuslaidy worked as a manicurist.

Cortes started playing baseball at the age of four. His father took him to see the Florida Marlins of Major League Baseball (MLB) play at Pro Player Stadium in Miami Gardens. Cortes attended Hialeah High School in Hialeah, Florida. He committed to play college baseball at Florida International University.

== Career ==
=== New York Yankees ===
The New York Yankees selected Cortes in the 36th round of the 2013 MLB draft. He signed with the Yankees, receiving an $85,000 signing bonus, and made his professional debut that year with the Gulf Coast League Yankees of the Rookie-level Gulf Coast League, where he had a 0–1 win–loss record with a 4.42 earned run average (ERA) in 18 1/3 innings pitched. He returned there in 2014, going 1–2 with a 2.27 ERA in 11 games (two starts). Cortes spent 2015 with the Pulaski Yankees of the Rookie-level Appalachian League, where he compiled a 6–3 record with a 2.26 ERA in 12 games (ten starts). In 2016, he pitched for the Charleston RiverDogs of the Single-A South Atlantic League, Tampa Yankees of the High-A Florida State League, Trenton Thunder of the Double-A Eastern League, and the Scranton/Wilkes-Barre RailRiders of the Triple-A International League, pitching to a combined 11–4 record with a 1.53 ERA in 21 games (12 starts). Cortes played 2017 with Tampa, Trenton, and the RailRiders. He finished the season with a 2.06 ERA between the three levels.

=== Baltimore Orioles ===
The Baltimore Orioles selected Cortes from the Yankees organization in the 2017 Rule 5 draft. During spring training with the Orioles, Cortes competed for a spot on the Orioles' Opening Day roster as either a starting pitcher or relief pitcher.

Cortes made the Orioles' Opening Day roster in 2018 as a relief pitcher, and made his major league debut on March 31. He allowed a grand slam to Josh Reddick on April 3. On April 9, he walked Curtis Granderson with the bases loaded, then gave up a grand slam to Josh Donaldson. The Orioles designated Cortes for assignment the next day. He had allowed four runs on ten hits, including two grand slams, in four games pitched.

=== New York Yankees (second stint) ===
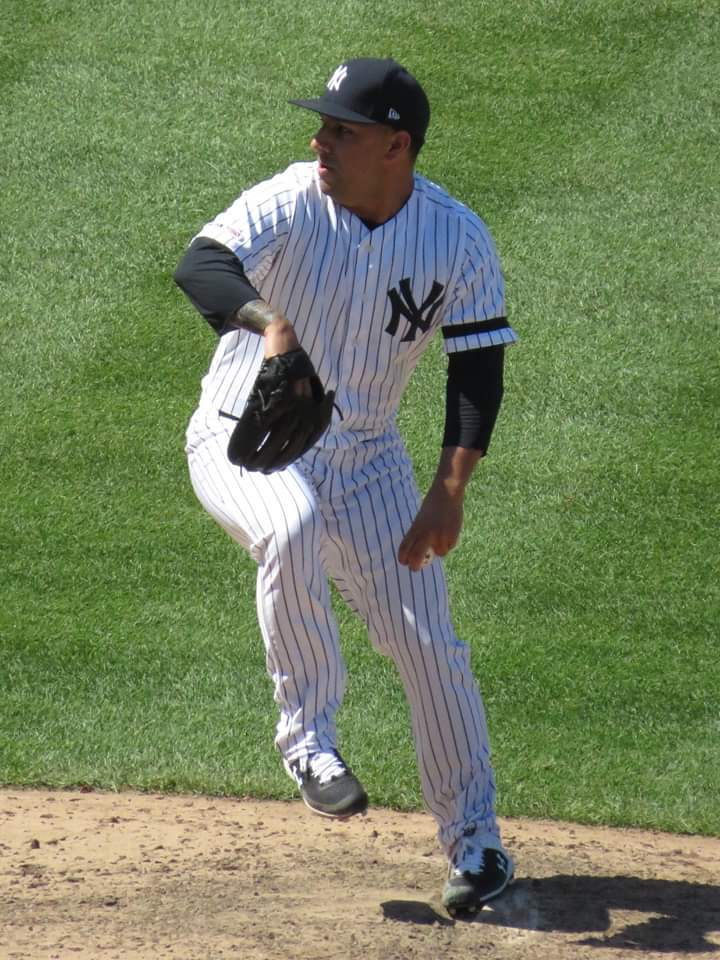
Cortes playing for the Yankees in 2019

On April 13, 2018, the Orioles returned Cortes to the Yankees. He played in one game for Trenton before returning to Scranton/Wilkes-Barre, combining for a 6–6 record and 3.68 ERA in 24 games. After the regular season, Cortes played for the Estrellas Orientales of the Dominican Professional Baseball League, where he learned how to throw a cut fastball.

The Yankees invited Cortes to spring training as a non-roster player in 2019. He did not make the team and was assigned to Scranton/Wilkes-Barre. The Yankees promoted him to the major leagues on May 9. On June 15, he earned his first major league win, striking out seven batters, and allowing two earned runs in five innings. The Yankees optioned him to Triple-A with Aaron Judge coming off the injured list on June 21. He returned to the major league roster on June 23 when Cameron Maybin went on the injured list. In 33 games, Cortes posted a 5–1 record and 5.67 ERA.

=== Seattle Mariners ===
On November 25, 2019, the Yankees traded Cortes to the Seattle Mariners for $28,300 of international bonus pool money. He hurt his elbow in August 2020, sending him to injured list. Working at the Mariners' alternate training site, a coach helped him to change the grip of his fastball, which helped him add backspin to the pitch. In 2020, Cortes gave up 13 runs over 7 2/3 innings, producing an unsightly 15.26 ERA. On October 22, Cortes was outrighted off of the 40-man roster after he was activated from the 60-day injured list and elected free agency.

=== New York Yankees (third stint) ===
On December 20, 2020, Cortes signed a minor league contract to return to the New York Yankees organization. Cortes began the 2021 season with the Triple-A RailRiders, then was promoted to the majors on May 30. Over the course of the 2021 season, Cortes became a favorite of Yankees fans. His signature mustache, along with his unique style of pitching and many productive appearances, garnered him much praise, and brought the moniker "Nasty Nestor." He finished the year with 93 innings pitched over 22 appearances, 14 of them starts, and finished with a 2.90 ERA and 103 strikeouts.

Cortes began the 2022 season in the Yankees' starting rotation. He threw an immaculate inning against the Orioles on April 16. Against the Texas Rangers on May 9, Cortes pitched 7 1/3 innings before allowing his first hit. He was selected for the All-Star Game, where he registered two strikeouts, a hit by pitch, and a walk in 1 inning pitched. Working exclusively as a starter, he finished the regular season with a 12-4 record and a 2.44 ERA in 158 1/3 innings pitched in 28 games. In November 2022, Cortes announced his intention to represent the United States national team in the 2023 World Baseball Classic. However, in February 2023, he withdrew from the tournament due to a hamstring injury.

Cortes began the 2023 season continuing as a member of the Yankees' rotation. He struggled, posting a 5.16 ERA across 11 starts, before being placed on the injured list with a left rotator cuff strain on June 8. He was transferred to the 60-day injured list on July 7. Cortes was activated on August 5. He made one start, then was returned to the injured list on August 11 due to the rotator cuff strain. He was transferred to the 60–day injured list on September 12, officially ending his season, as the Yankees missed the postseason for the first time since 2016. In 12 starts, he logged a 5–2 record and a 4.97 ERA with 67 strikeouts in 63 1/3 innings pitched.

With Gerrit Cole beginning the 2024 season on the injured list, the Yankees chose Cortes as their Opening Day starting pitcher. Cortes was 9–10 with a 3.77 ERA in 31 games (30 starts) over the course of the 2024 season, ranking second on the team in innings pitched (174 1/3) and third in strikeouts (162). Cortes was sidelined to begin the Yankees' postseason run due to a left elbow flexor strain suffered on September 18. He was re-added to the 26-man roster for the World Series. In the bottom of the 10th inning of Game 1, Cortes retired the first batter he faced, then allowed a walk-off grand slam to Freddie Freeman.

=== Milwaukee Brewers ===
On December 13, 2024, the Yankees traded Cortes and Caleb Durbin to the Milwaukee Brewers for reliever Devin Williams. On March 29, Cortes got a good ovation from the Yankees fans when he made his return as a member of the Brewers. In his first start, he pitched two innings, allowed six hits and eight runs, walked five batters, and struck out two batters in his worst start to date as the Brewers were routed by the New York Yankees in a 20–9 loss. Cortes got his first win of the season over the Cincinnati Reds where he pitched six innings, allowed one hit, and walked two batters, while striking out six batters as the Brewers beat the Reds in a 1–0 win on April 3. That would be his final game with Milwaukee, as he went on the 15-day injured list with an elbow injury.

=== San Diego Padres ===
On July 31, 2025, the Brewers traded Cortes, Jorge Quintana, and cash to the San Diego Padres for Brandon Lockridge. Cortes was activated off of the injured list on August 3. He made six starts for San Diego, posting a 1-3 record and 5.47 ERA with 21 strikeouts across 26 1/3 innings pitched. On October 16, it was announced that Cortes would miss 9-to-10 months after undergoing surgery to repair a tendon tear in his throwing arm.

=== Philadelphia Phillies ===
On August 19, 2026, Cortes signed with the Philadelphia Phillies, who optioned him to the Single-A Clearwater Threshers.

== Player profile ==
Cortes throws a four-seam fastball that averages approximately 91 miles per hour (146 km/h). He also throws a cutter, slider, changeup, and a curveball. His curveball has been registered as slow as 47 miles per hour (76 km/h). Cortes hides the ball well in his wind-up, which helps to alleviate the problems presented by his shorter frame. When throwing a slider or curveball, his arm angle is slightly lower than his four-seam fastball.

Cortes also employs trickery in his wind-up to throw hitters off. He sometimes varies his step timing and sometimes pauses and rocks back and forth in the middle of his wind-up, and occasionally abbreviates his wind-up and releases the ball quickly.

== Personal life ==
Cortes and his girlfriend, Alondra Esteras Russy, became engaged after the 2022 All-Star Game. They married in November 2023. The couple's first son was born in 2025.

Cortes is a fan of horse racing, attending races at the Hialeah Park Race Track when he was young. He partnered with an equipment manager of the Yankees to purchase a harness racing horse in 2023.

== See also ==
- List of Major League Baseball annual shutout leaders
- List of Major League Baseball pitchers who have thrown an immaculate inning
- List of Major League Baseball players from Cuba
- Rule 5 draft results
