= Batabanó Municipal Museum =

Museum in Cuba

- Museo Municipal de Batabanó
- Established: 2 February 1982
- Location: Batabanó, Cuba
- Coordinates: 22.719506°N 82.2869686°W

Batabanó Municipal Museum is a museum located in the 64th street in Batabanó, Cuba. It was established as a museum on 2 February 1982.

The museum holds collections on archaeology, history and weaponry.

== See also ==
- List of museums in Cuba
