= Surgidero de Batabanó =

Surgidero de Batabanó Surgidero
- Village
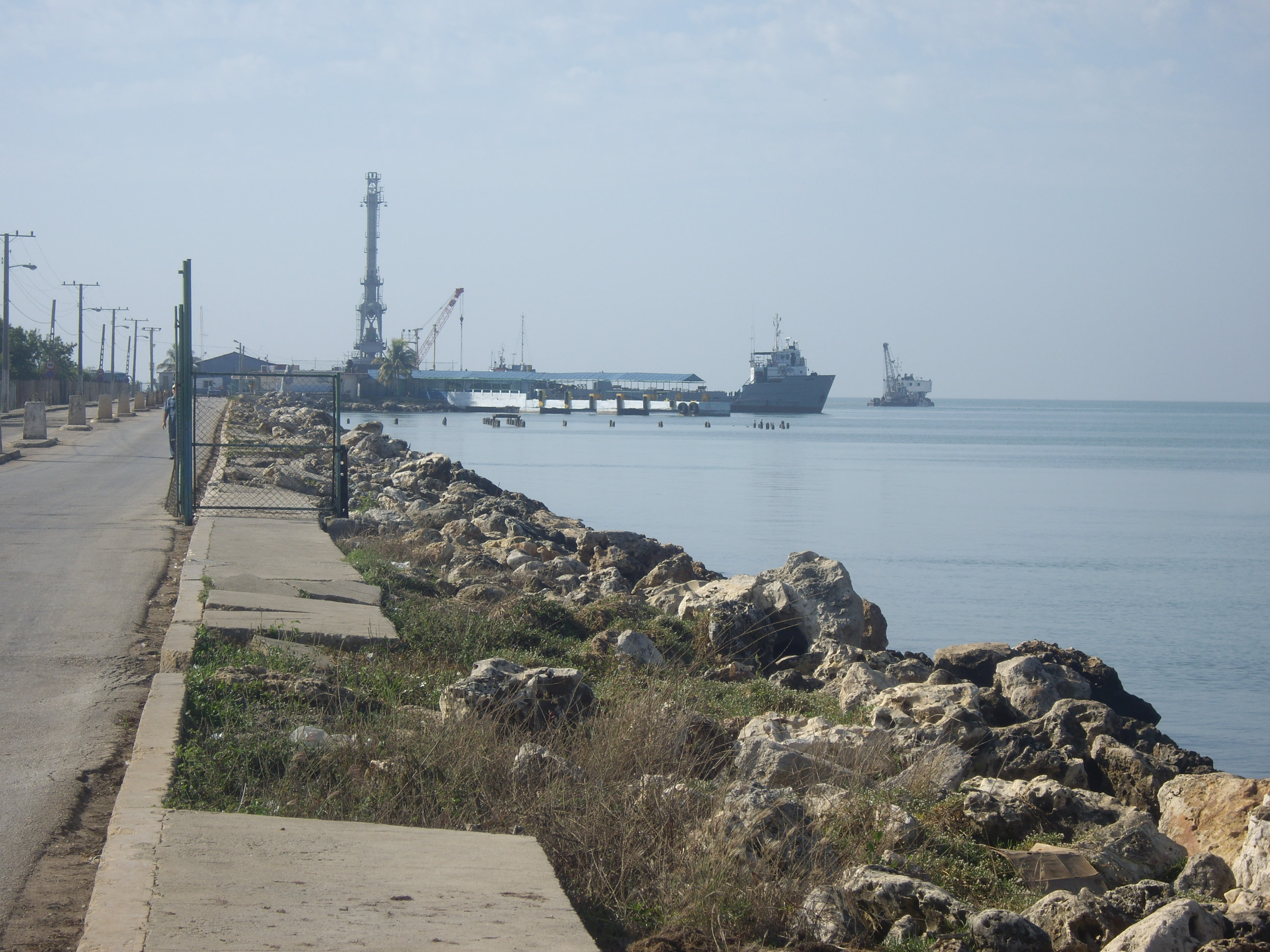
- The port of Surgidero

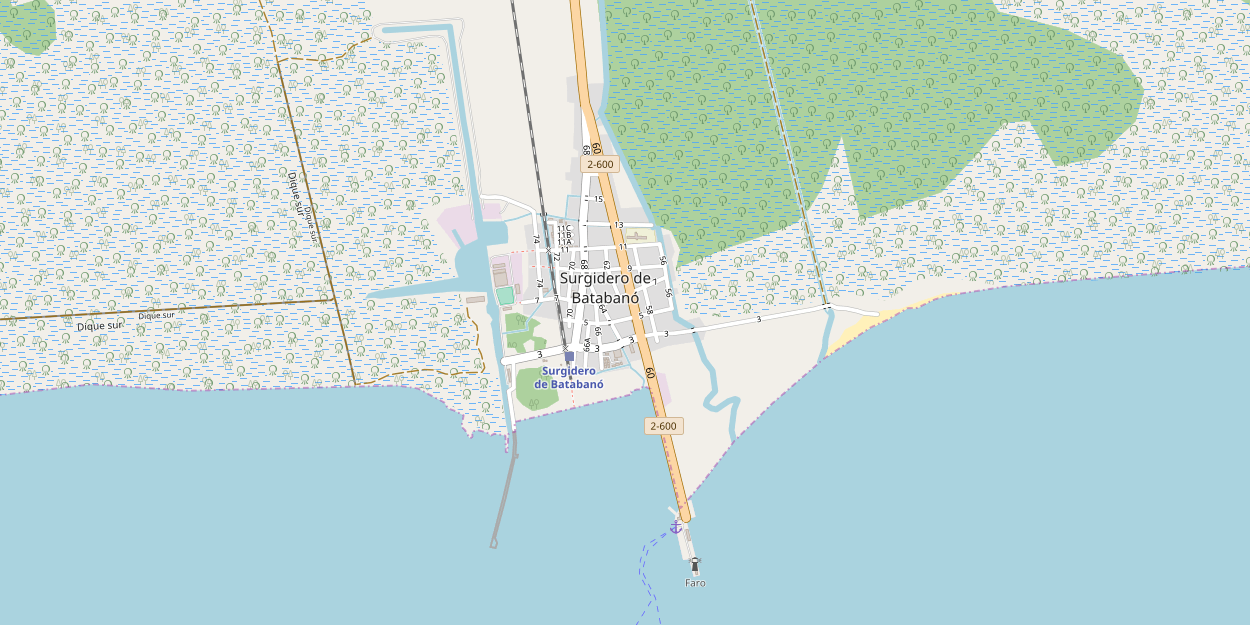
- OSM map showing Surgidero and its port

- Location of Surgidero in Cuba
- Coordinates: 22°41′14.6″N 82°17′37.7″W
- Country: Cuba
- Province: Mayabeque
- Municipality: Batabanó
- Founded: 1688
- Elevation: 5 m (16 ft)

Population (2011)
  - Total: 6,000
- Time zone: UTC-5 (EST)
- Area code: +53-7

Surgidero de Batabanó, also shortened as Surgidero, is a Cuban village and consejo popular ("people's council", i.e. hamlet) of the municipality of Batabanó, in Mayabeque Province. In 2011 it had a population of about 6,000.

== History ==
The village was officially founded on February 5, 1688.

== Geography ==
Located by the Caribbean Coast, on the Gulf of Batabanó, Surgidero is a coastal village surrounded by a marsh, that lies 3 km south of Batabanó. It is 22 km from Melena del Sur, 24 from Quivicán, 30 from Playa Mayabeque, 32 from Güira de Melena, 37 from Güines, San José de las Lajas and Bejucal, and 54 from Havana city centre.

== Transport ==
The Port of Surgidero, built in the 16th century, is the main port for the communication to Isla de la Juventud (to Nueva Gerona) and Cayo Largo del Sur, with ferryboat and passenger regular services.

The local railway station is the southern terminus of the Havana-Surgidero line, part of the Havana Suburban Railway network. The village is 3 km far from the state highway "Circuito Sur" (CS).

== Gallery ==
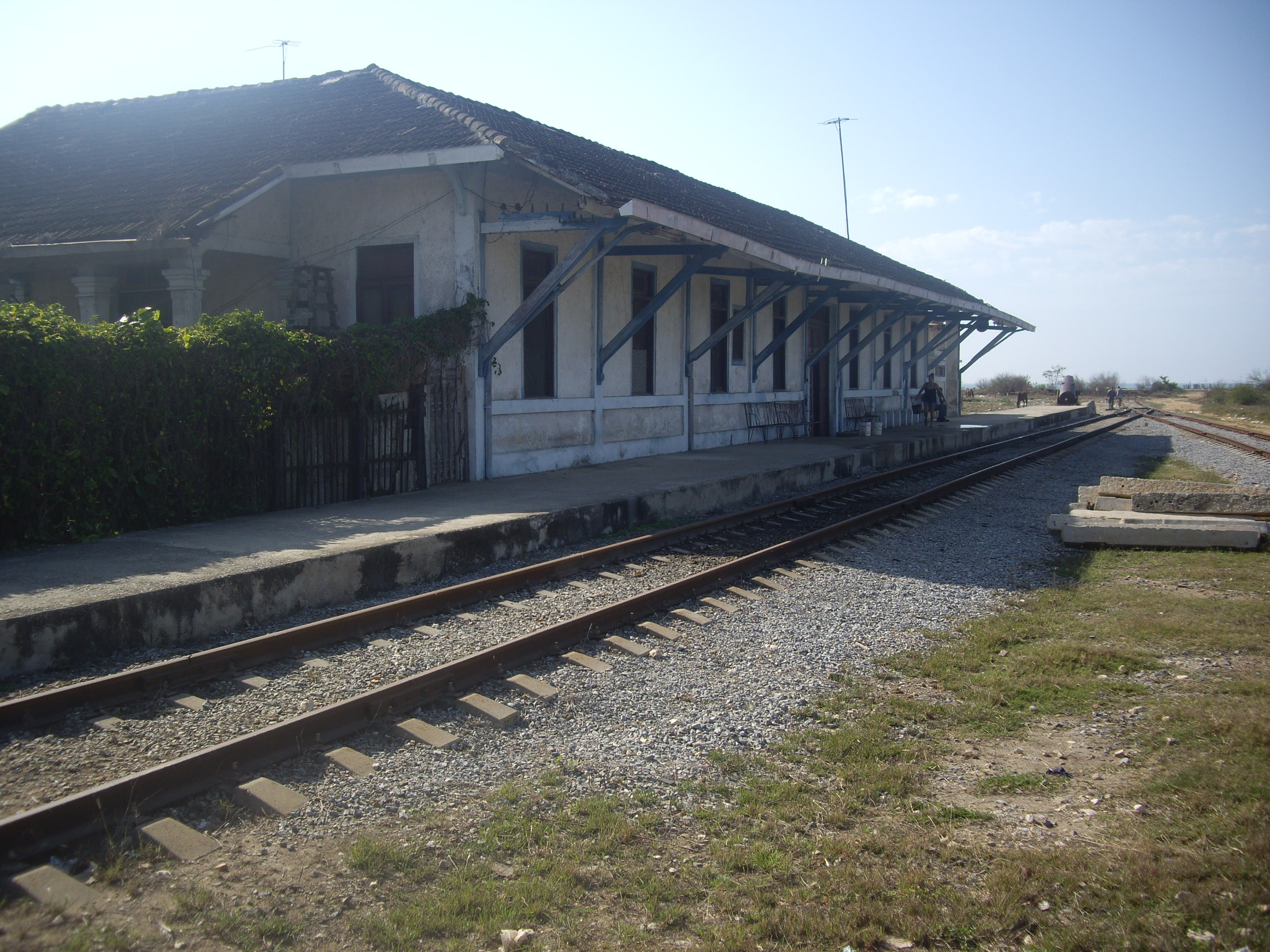
Surgidero station

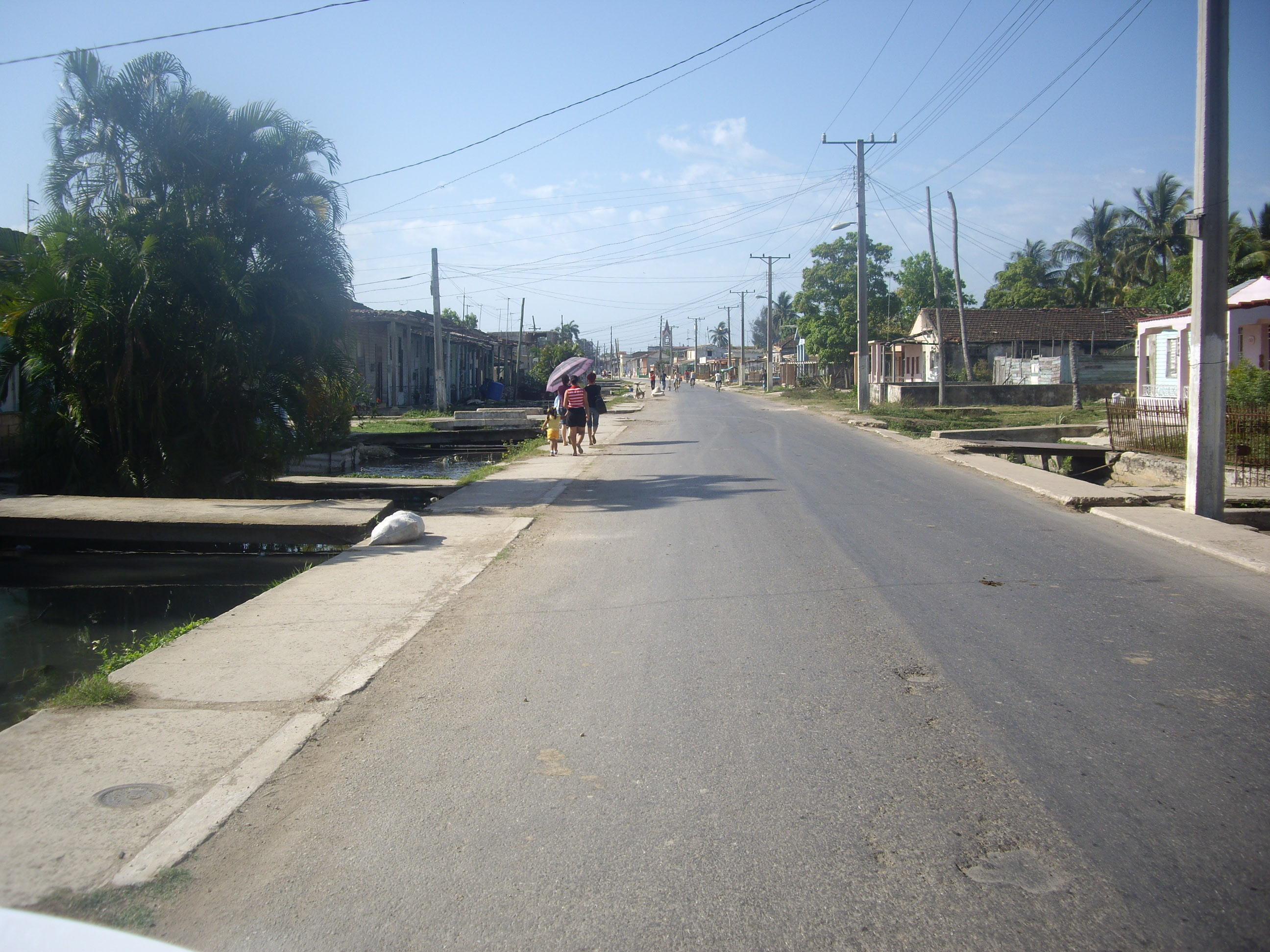
A village's road

== Notable people ==
- Nestor Cortés Jr., All-Star pitcher for the New York Yankees

== See also ==
- Surgidero de Batabanó Lighthouse
- Municipalities of Cuba
- List of cities in Cuba
