= Batabanó, Cuba =

Batabanó
- Municipality
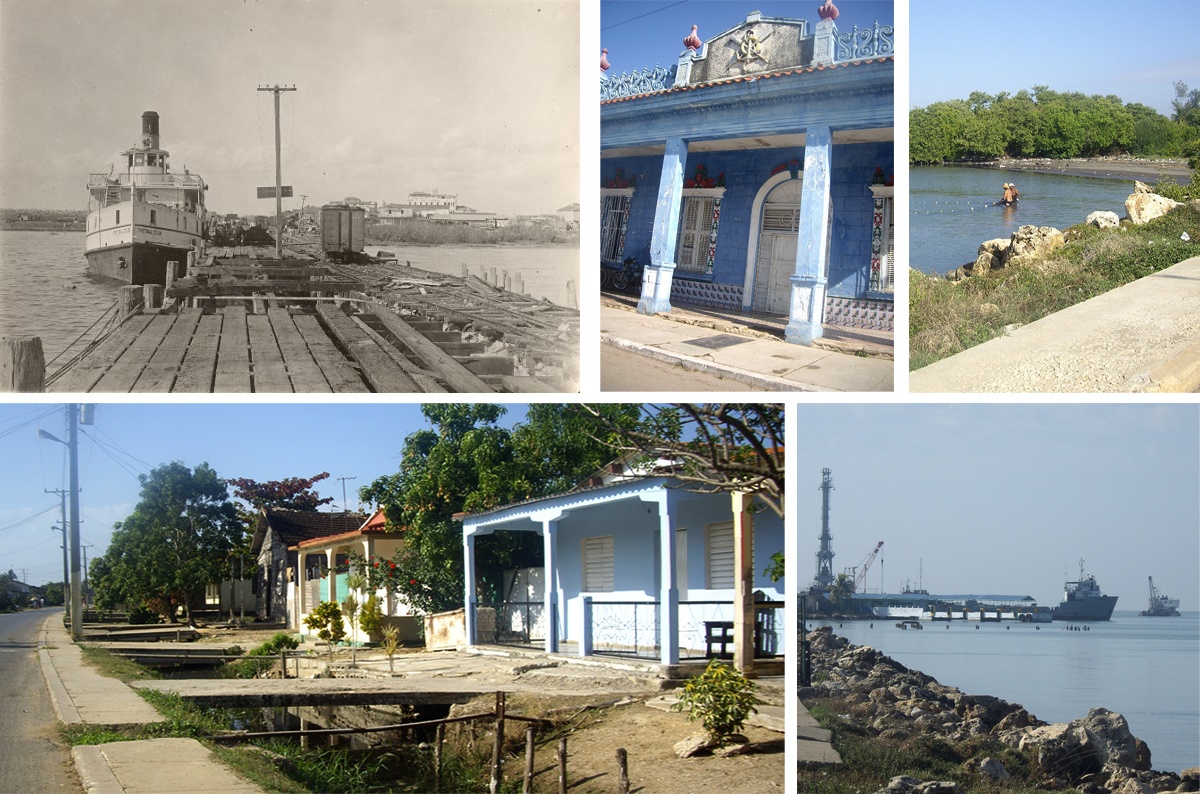

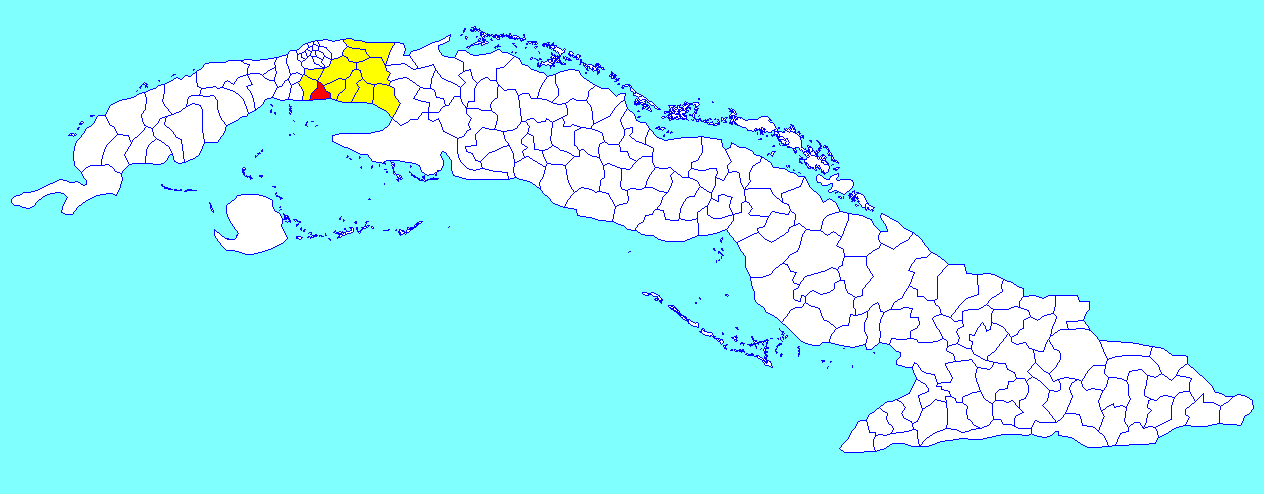
- Batabanó municipality (red) within Mayabeque Province (yellow) and Cuba
- Coordinates: 22°41′55″N 82°17′38″W
- Country: Cuba
- Province: Mayabeque
- Founded: 1688
- Established: 1898 (Municipality)

Government
  - President: Nedelis Caridad Delgado Felipe

Area
  - Total: 187 km^{2} (72 sq mi)
- Elevation: 5 m (16 ft)

Population (2022)
  - Total: 27,232
  - Density: 146/km^{2} (377/sq mi)
- Time zone: UTC-5 (EST)
- Area code: +53-7
- Website: https://www.batabano.gob.cu/es/

Batabanó (Spanish pronunciation: [bataβaˈno]) is a municipality and town in the Mayabeque Province of Cuba. It was founded in 1688.

== History ==
Until the 1977 administrative reform, the municipality was divided into the barrios of Pueblo de Batabanó, Surgidero, Camacho, Pozo Redondo, La Julia and Sopapo.

== Geography ==
The municipality is crossed by a number of small rivers, among them Río Guanabo, Río San Felipe, Río Pacheco, Río San Juan and Río Santa Gertrudis. The Batabanó cays, developed in the sea south of the community are part of the Canarreos Archipelago.

Batabanó's territory is bordered by the Caribbean Sea and by the municipalities of Güira de Melena (in Artemisa Province), Quivicán, San José de las Lajas and Melena del Sur. It includes the villages of 13 de Marzo, Camacho, El Sopapo, La Gía, La Julia, La Serafina, Pedroso, Pozo Redondo, Santa Barbara, Santa Lucia, Surgidero de Batabanó and Zayas.

== Demographics ==
In 2022, the municipality of Batabanó had a population of 27,232. With a total area of 187 km^{2} (72 sq mi), it has a population density of 150/km^{2} (390/sq mi).

== Transport ==
The town is served by a railway station on the Havana-Surgidero line, part of the Havana Suburban Railway network. It is crossed in the middle by the state highway "Circuito Sur" (CS).

A marina is located in Surgidero, the port of Batabanó. This port is dated back to the 16th century and functioned as the south port of Havana for the coastline navigation to other Cuban cities before the railroad connected all the country in the 19th century. Nowadays is the main port for the communication to Isla de la Juventud (to the port of Nueva Gerona) and Cayo Largo del Sur with ferryboat and passenger regular services, as well as, an important fishing port.

== See also ==
- Batabanó Municipal Museum
- Surgidero de Batabanó Lighthouse
- Municipalities of Cuba
- List of cities in Cuba
