= Loustalot =

Loustalot is a surname. Notable people with the surname include:

- Ángel Loustalot
- Christophe Loustalot (born 1992), French rugby union player
- E. V. Loustalot (died 1942), United States Army officer
- Jules Loustalot
- Tim Loustalot (born 1965), American golfer
- Victoria Loustalot, American writer
