= Mayabeque =

Mayabeque can refer to several places in Cuba:

- Mayabeque Province, created in 2011, comprising the eastern half of the former Havana Province
- Mayabeque River, in western Cuba
- Playa Mayabeque, a beach in the southern part of Mayabeque Province

== Other uses ==
- FC Mayabeque, a football (soccer) club in Cuba
