= José Borrel Tudurí =

National Chief Scouts of Cuban Scouting

- Known for: One of the last National Chief Scouts of Cuban Scouting

Doctor José Borrel Tudurí was one of the last National Chief Scouts of Cuban Scouting. Scouting existed in Cuba itself until the 1960s, when Cuban Scouting ceased operations after the Cuban revolution of 1959. Cuban Scouts rendered service during those times, directing traffic, collecting rations, helping in hospitals and establishing first aid stations. In 1961, the World Scout Conference terminated the World Organization of the Scout Movement membership, claiming that the Asociación de Scouts de Cuba had ceased to exist. The last of the National Chief Scouts were Virgilio Morales Díaz and José Borrel Tudurí, along with Doctor Celina Cardoso, President and Secretary of the National Council. Kenneth Symington of Cañal was the last National Executive Commissioner.
