= Ángel Loustalot =

One of the pioneers of Cuban Scouting

- Known for: One of the pioneers of Cuban Scouting

Ángel Loustalot was one of the pioneers of Cuban Scouting. In 1914, the first Scout groups in Cuba were founded, and Jules Loustalot, Miguel Ángel Quevedo, Carlos Alzugarai and others wrote up the statutes and began Scout activities.

The first troops of Boy Scouts in Cuba met under the sponsorship of the American Legion, the Mother's Club del Vedado and the electric generating plant of the Compañía Cubana de Electricidad. Angel Loustalot, the son of Jules Loustalot, was commissioner for other pioneers of the Scout Movement, Enrique Quintana, Dr. Moisés Boudé, Domingo Romeo Jaime and Oscar Poey Bonachea.
