= Domingo Romeo Jaime =

- Known for: One of the pioneers of Cuban Scouting

Domingo Romeo Jaime was one of the pioneers of Cuban Scouting. The first troops of Boy Scouts in Cuba met under the sponsorship of the American Legion, the Mother's Club del Vedado and the electric generating plant of the Compañía Cubana de Electricidad. Angel Loustalot, the son of Jules Loustalot, was commissioner for other pioneers of the Scout Movement, Enrique Quintana, Dr. Moisés Boudé, Domingo Romeo Jaime and Oscar Poey Bonachea.
