= Menocal =

Menocal is a surname. Notable people with the surname include:

- Armando Menocal (1863–1942), Cuban painter
- Manuel Hilario de Céspedes y García Menocal (1944–2025), Cuban clergyman
- María Rosa Menocal (1953–2012), Cuban-born scholar of medieval culture and history who resided in the United States
- Mario García Menocal (1866–1941), President of Cuba from 1913 to 1921
- Serafín García Menocal (1911–2003), Cuban public utility executive, political author, and public speaker, president of the National Council of the Asociación de Scouts de Cuba in the 1950s
