= Lavaggi =

Lavaggi is an Italian surname. Notable people with the surname include:

- Carlos Martín Alzugaray Lavaggi, Cuban scouting pioneer
- Giovanni Lavaggi (born 1958), Italian racing driver

== See also ==
- Lavaggi LS1
