= Melena del Sur =

- Municipality
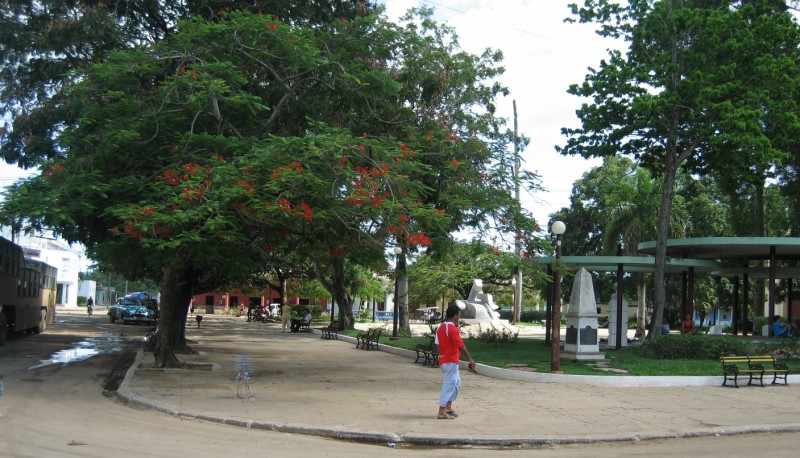
- Town's Park

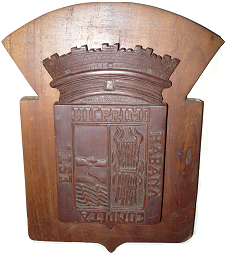
- Coat of arms

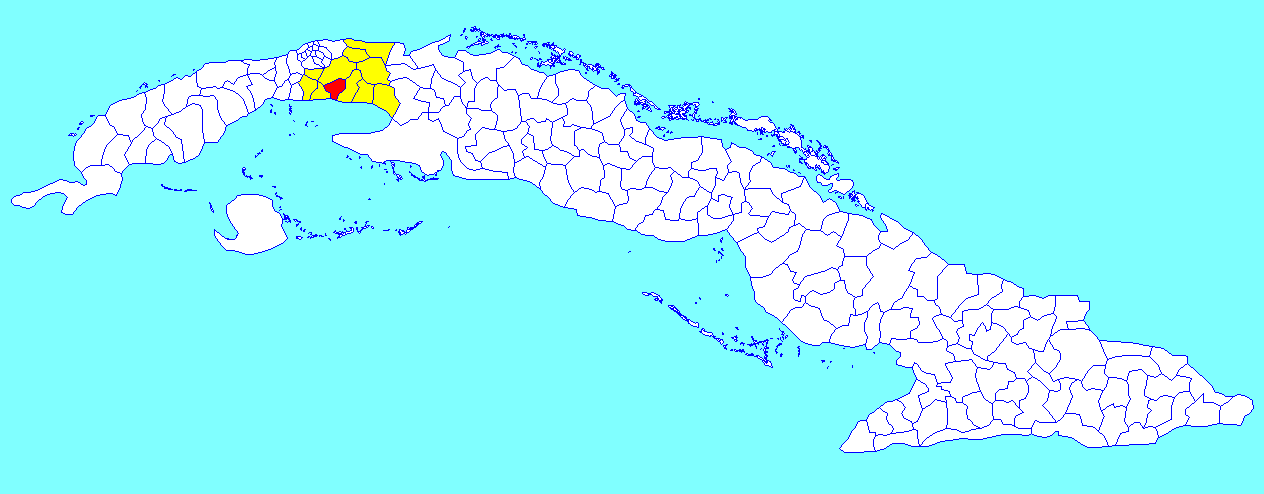
- Melena del Sur municipality (red) within Mayabeque Province (yellow) and Cuba
- Coordinates: 22°47′17.20″N 82°9′4.40″W
- Country: Cuba
- Province: Mayabeque
- Founded: 1768
- Established (Municipality): 1878

Area
  - Total: 231.80 km^{2} (89.50 sq mi)
- Elevation: 30 m (98 ft)

Population (2022)
  - Total: 20,383
  - Density: 89/km^{2} (230/sq mi)
- Time zone: UTC-5 (EST)
- Postal code: 33 300
- Area code: +53 47
- Website: Melena del Sur

Melena del Sur is a town and a municipality located south of the Mayabeque Province, in Cuba. It is bordered on the north and northwest by San José de las Lajas, on the east by the municipality of Güines, on the west by Batabanó, and on the south by the Gulf of Batabanó. The south shore holds the town's only beach, Mayabeque Beach. This beach is the mouth of the Mayabeque River.

The municipality is divided into 5 people's councils (wards or quarters), named after the most important towns, which are: Melena del Sur, Mañalich, Guara, Lechuga and Monte-Zapote. Its population exceeds 20,000 inhabitants, about half of whom live in the town.

== History ==
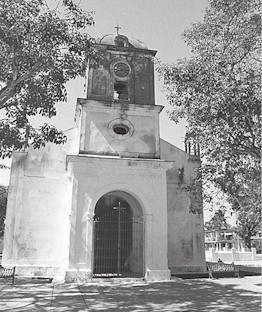
Church of la Santísima Trinidad de Guara

The town of Melena del Sur war first founded in 1768 on the plains of Güines. The Town Council of Melena del Sur was first established on January 14, 1878 and was later reorganized in the year 1899.

Foundation: There are several versions regarding the meaning of the name Melena. One possiblitiy is that Melaine is black in Greek and was the predominant color of some of its most fertile land. Most likely due to the name of a place of early settlers who founded the San Juan de Melena corral, where they later built the first house, which led to the current town. Still debate about whether it was on its shores or in neighboring Batabanó where he first founded the city of Havana in 1515 before being transferred to the northern coast. As a result, the municipal coat of arms is the Latin phrase "HAVANA PRIMO HIC EST CONDIT", i.e.: Here was first founded Havana.

On the local People's Power Municipal is the direction of local government and is composed of several units which yield information on the progress of work as the economy, services, sports, culture, recreation, etc. Relations of solidarity with the City of La Oliva of Spain, who go to the island to support different tasks alongside people.

For Mañalich and Guara, crossing the railroad oldest Cuba and Latin America, which originally reported the cities of San Cristobal de Havana and St. Julian of the Güines, it now extends to the city of Cienfuegos, and is connected to the circuit northern railways.

== Economy ==
The municipality's economy is almost entirely composed of the Agricultural Crops Enterprise, followed by UBPC, CPA and CCS that comprise the Company and Agricultural Gregorio Arlee Mañalich emerged following the demise of its objects in such company as Agro-Industry (2006–2007) and his commitment to agricultural development just like the UBPC, CPA and CCS it. There are farms engaged in animal fattening and poultry are birds, pigs, turkeys, etc. and intensified breeding cattle by other institutions.

== Education ==
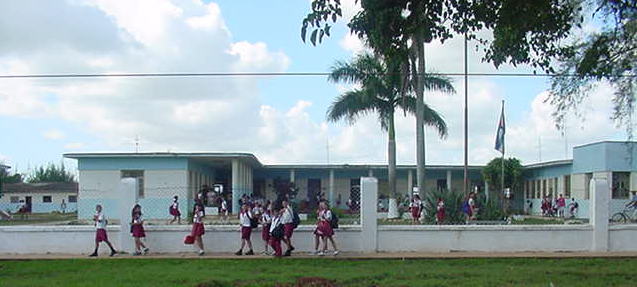
Elementary Suarez Rogelio Perea

In terms of education, structural changes were made in 2010. The Pedro Soto Alba and Rogelio Perea Suárez Polytechnic Schools were merged and now both operate at the former IPUEC República de Güinea site. The Escuela de Formación de Maestros Emergentes República de Hungría (School for Emerging Teacher Training) stopped graduating students in this specialty, and its classrooms are now used by students from the Félix Varela Vocational Pre-University Institute of Exact Sciences. The previous school building, despite being relatively new, required restoration due to various issues.

For secondary education, in addition to the facility occupied by ESBU Frank País, the former Politécnico Rogelio Perea building in the Mañalich Popular Council and the Alberto Montes School in Guara were assigned to avoid student transportation to the municipal center. This allows many students to attend school within their own communities. Students from the former Camilo Cienfuegos Primary School joined those in secondary education at the buildings formerly occupied by IPOL Rogelio Perea, while the Camilo Cienfuegos facilities began to be used by students from the Melena Vocational School. Students from the municipal university campuses have reintegrated into provincial institutions, as these specialties are now offered directly in the province.

Each classroom in the various educational centers is equipped with a television set to deliver teleclasses to students remotely. Additionally, every school has at least one computer lab to support the teaching system.

Also located in this municipality is one of the Vocational Pre-University Institutes of Exact Sciences, IPVCE Félix Varela. Previously located on the Mayabeque Playa road, between Zapote and La Luisa, it has since been relocated and renamed.

== Health ==
The development of public health is currently booming as part of the Cuban government’s efforts to improve the system. Facilities include a maternity home for pregnant women experiencing complications, a physiotherapy room, and a polyclinic equipped to perform ultrasounds, X-rays, and clinical laboratory tests. There is also a small recovery room for patients who require short-term lodging, as well as an intensive care unit outfitted with modern technology for specialized care.

The Municipal Polyclinic provides medical services on call 24 hours a day, including laboratory services, X-rays, and intensive care. The integration of the Central Municipal Provincial Ambulance with the network helps ensure better emergency care services.

== Culture ==
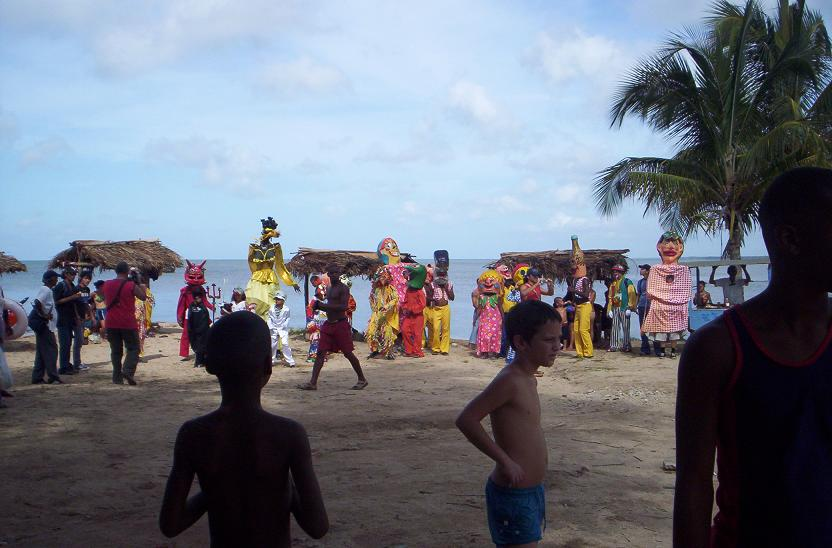
Activities for the start of the summer season at the Beach Mayabeque

For the enjoyment and recreation of its inhabitants the Directorate of Culture has various libraries scattered localities in the municipality, as well as a House of Culture, the Melena del Sur Municipal Museum and an Art Gallery.

== See also ==
- Playa Mayabeque
- Autopista A3 (Cuba)
- List of cities in Cuba
- Municipalities of Cuba
