= Sossi =

Sossi can refer to:

- SOSSI (in upper-case) - the Scouts on Stamps Society International
- Richard A. Sossi, Maryland politician
- Vesna Sossi, Canadian medical physicist

In addition, the term in a lower-case form also has ties to Italian socialism
