= Moisés Boudé =

Pioneers of Cuban Scouting

- Known for: One of the pioneers of Cuban Scouting

Dr. Moisés Boudé was one of the pioneers of Cuban Scouting. The first troops of Boy Scouts in Cuba met under the sponsorship of the American Legion, the Mother's Club del Vedado and the electric generating plant of the Compañía Cubana de Electricidad. Angel Loustalot, the son of Jules Loustalot, was commissioner for other pioneers of the Scout Movement, Enrique Quintana, Dr. Moisés Boudé, Domingo Romeo Jaime and Oscar Poey Bonachea.
