= Cristina Ayala (writer) =

Cuban writer

- Born: Maria Cristina Fragas; July 24, 1856; Güines, Cuba
- Died: April 20, 1936 (aged 79); Güines, Cuba
- Occupations: Writer and poet
- Spouse: Cecilio Larrondo (m. 1912)
- Writing career
- Pen name: Cristina Ayala
- Language: Spanish
- Notable work: Ofrendas Mayabequinas (1926)

Maria Cristina Fragas (July 24, 1856 – April 20, 1936), known by her pen name, Cristina Ayala, was an Afro-Cuban writer and poet.

== Biography ==
The daughter of a Creole mother who was enslaved and an unknown father, she was born free in Güines, Cuba, on July 24, 1856. She did not marry until 1912, when she wed Cecilio Larrondo. Fragas died in Güines in 1936 at the age of 79.

== Writing ==
Her work was published in various newspapers and journals including El Pueblo Libre and El Sufragista, as well as in Minerva, a magazine dedicated to black women for which she was a founding editor. She is believed to be the first Afro-Hispanic writer to talk about race in her poetry. In her work, she opposed slavery and supported racial equality and national independence for all Cubans.

A collection of her work, Ofrendas Mayabequinas, was published in 1926 with a foreword by Valentin Cuesta Jimenez.

== Recognition ==
After her death, the town council of Güines named a street in her honour. The street was renamed after the Cuban Revolution and no longer exists.
