= Melena del Sur Municipal Museum =

Museum in Cuba

- Museo Municipal de Melena del Sur
- Established: 16 February 1982
- Location: Melena del Sur, Cuba

Melena del Sur Municipal Museum is a museum located in the 26th street in Melena del Sur, Cuba. It was established on 16 February 1982.

The museum holds collections on history and weaponry.

== See also ==
- List of museums in Cuba
