= Asociación de Guías de Cuba =

National Guiding organization of Cuba

- Founded: 1940

The Asociación de Guías de Cuba (Girl Guides of Cuba) was started by María Abrisqueta de Zulueta, a Spanish citizen settled on the island, also founder of the Girl Guide Movement in Spain, and two Cuban sisters surnamed Brull.

The association is a former member of the World Association of Girl Guides and Girl Scouts, last mentioned in 1969. Law-Decree 2118 of 27 January 1955 declared the Asociación de Guías de Cuba of public utility, and therefore approved national scale organization throughout the Republic.

== See also ==
- Asociación de Scouts de Cuba
