= Güines Municipal Museum =

- Museo Municipal de Güines
- Established: 17 February 1982
- Location: Güines, Cuba

Güines Municipal Museum is a museum located in the 77th street in Güines, Cuba. It was established on 17 February 1982.

The museum holds collections on history, weaponry, numismatics and decorative arts.

== See also ==
- List of museums in Cuba
