= Rogelio Pina Estrada =

Dr. Rogelio Pina Estrada

Attorney

Dr. Rogelio Pina Estrada is a Cuban retired attorney who was a member of the World Scout Committee of the World Organization of the Scout Movement from 1949 until 1951.

He was married to Evangelina Perez and they had two daughters, Rosa Pina Perez who married Dr. Arturo Torres Viera and Mercedes Pina Perez who married Fernando Busto Sanchez. Dr. Pina later married Guillermina Enriquez. His legal office was located on Compostela Street in Old Havana.

== See also ==
- Asociación de Scouts de Cuba
