= Asociación de Scouts de Cuba =

National Scouting organization of Cuba

- Scout Association of Cuba
- Country: Cuba
- Founded: 1927
- Defunct: 1961
- Membership: 6,500

The Asociación de Scouts de Cuba (ASC, Scout Association of Cuba) was the national Scouting organization of Cuba from 1927 to 1961. Scouting in Cuba started in 1914, in 1927 the ASC was founded and became a member of the World Organization of the Scout Movement the same year and was suspended from WOSM membership in 1961. At the end of the 1950s, the boys-only association had about 6,500 members. Cuba is now one of only five of the world's independent countries that do not have Scouting.

== History ==
In 1914, the first Scout groups in Cuba were founded, and Carlos Alzugarai, Miguel Ángel Quevedo, Jules Loustalot and others wrote up the statutes and began Scout activities. The first troops of Boy Scouts in Cuba met under the sponsorship of the American Legion, the Mother's Club del Vedado and the electric generating plant of the Compañía Cubana de Electricidad. Angel Loustalot, the son of Jules Loustalot, was commissioner for other pioneers of the Scout Movement, Enrique Quintana, Dr. Moisés Boudé, Domingo Romeo Jaime and Oscar Poey Bonachea. In the following years more local groups emerged, but they were not coordinated through a national association until 1927 when the Asociación de Scouts de Cuba was founded. The Scouts of Cuba was declared an official institution by presidential decree no. 871 of June 22, 1927. In the same year the association became a member of the World Organization of the Scout Movement. During its first years, Cuban Scouting followed the model of the Boy Scouts of America, using the uniform, Boy Scout Handbook and many of their practices.

1940s membership badge of the then-Exploradores de Cuba features a palm tree; the shape was not set, so the design changed depending on the artist

In the 1950s, the membership badge was colored to match the flag of Cuba.

In 1941, the ASC held its first national Jamboree in Havana. The second followed in 1948 in Cayo Conuco, Caibarién and the third in 1954 in Wajay celebrating the 40th anniversary of Scouting in Cuba.

Dr. Rogelio Pina Estrada was a member of the World Scout Committee of the World Organization of the Scout Movement from 1949 until 1951.

Salvador Fernández Beltrán D.J.C. of Matanzas was among the first in the Americas to receive Wood Badge training, at Gilwell Park, England. He was the first to receive honorary appointment as Deputy Camp Chief of Gilwell. With this influence, the Scouts of Cuba began to use short trousers like those worn by the English. Fernandez Beltrán was known for his work within the Scouts of Cuba, as well as assisting in the creation of the InterAmerican Scout Office, the divisional office of the World Scout Bureau of the World Organization of the Scout Movement, founded and maintained with headquarters in Havana from 1946 to 1960. At the beginning of the 1960s Fernandez Beltrán was appointed to the office of Deputy Secretary of the World Organization of the Scout Movement in Geneva, Switzerland. He retired to Venezuela where he died in 1987.

In February 1953, the Third-Inter-American Scout Conference was held at La Habana. In 1954, for the 40th anniversary of their foundation, the Scouts of Cuba celebrated with the Third National Jamboree Tercer Campamento Nacional de Patrullas in Wajay, Havana Province, attended by more than 1000 Scouts, including several neighboring countries. For this celebration, the Ministry of Communications issued Scout postage stamps.

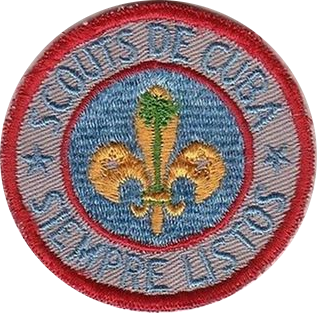
Scouts de Cuba contingent badge to the 1959 World Scout Jamboree

In 1956, under the leadership of Serafín García Menocal, President of the Consejo Nacional Scouts de Cuba (National Council), the Scouts of Cuba bought the national training grounds Campo Escuela Nacional Mayabeque at Mayabeque, along the river of the same name, near Catalina de Güines in Havana Province within 50 km of the capital. The National Camp School was dedicated to the training of Scouters and for Scout camping. The Field School was abandoned in 1961, and at the moment is under the water of Mampostón reservoir.

Scouting existed in Cuba itself until the 1960s, when Cuban Scouting ceased operations after the Cuban revolution of 1959. Cuban Scouts rendered service during those times, directing traffic, collecting rations, helping in hospitals and establishing first aid stations. In 1961, the World Scout Conference terminated the WOSM membership claiming that the ASC had ceased to exist. The last National Chief Scouts were Virgilio Morales Díaz and Doctor José Borrel Tudurí, along with Doctor Celina Cardoso, President and Secretary of the National Council. Kenneth Symington of Cañal was the last National Executive Commissioner.

Communist leaders replaced the association with the José Martí Pioneer Organization.

== Current status ==
Cuban Scouting-in-exile does not presently exist per agreement with WOSM in hopes of Scouting's eventual return, however Cuban-American Scouts of the Boy Scouts of America are instrumental in annual Lincoln-Martí celebrations in Miami, Florida. The Lincoln-Marti Camporee began in 1970 with troops largely from south Florida's Cuban-American community.

Recent developments have seen one new Scout group, in a Catholic church in Santiago de Cuba since early 2012. Mexican Scouts have provided material assistance, and growth is expected when bureaucrats authorize the Catholic Scouts. As of August 2012, this is only a pilot project.

== International Scouting units in Cuba ==
Boy Scouts of America Boy Scout Troop 435's badge features a Taino tribesman's head

- In addition, as on many military bases, there are American Boy Scouts in Guantanamo Bay Naval Base, serving in Cub Scout Pack 3401 and Boy Scout Troop 435, linked to the Direct Service branch of the Boy Scouts of America, which supports units of U.S. citizens around the world.

== See also ==
- Asociación de Guías de Cuba
- Scouting in Florida
