= Playa Mayabeque =

- Village
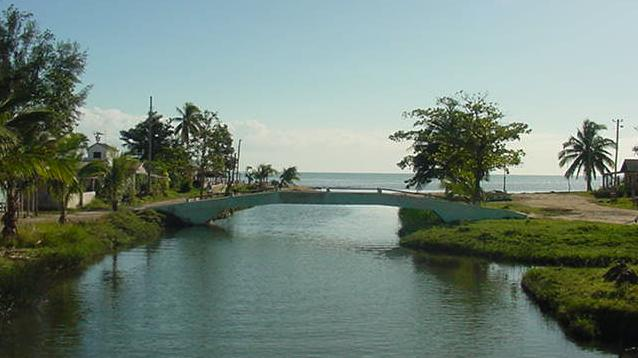
- Mayabeque Beach

- Location of Playa Mayabeque in Cuba
- Coordinates: 22°40′0″N 82°9′0″W
- Country: Cuba
- Province: Mayabeque
- Municipality: Melena del Sur
- Elevation: 5 m (16 ft)
- Time zone: UTC-5 (EST)
- Area code: +53-47

Playa Mayabeque is a beach in the southern part of Mayabeque Province, 5 km south of Melena del Sur on the southern shore of Cuba. It is the location of the mouth of the Mayabeque River, which gave its name to the new province of Mayabeque established in 2011. The muddy waters are considered by local people to have therapeutic properties.

== History ==
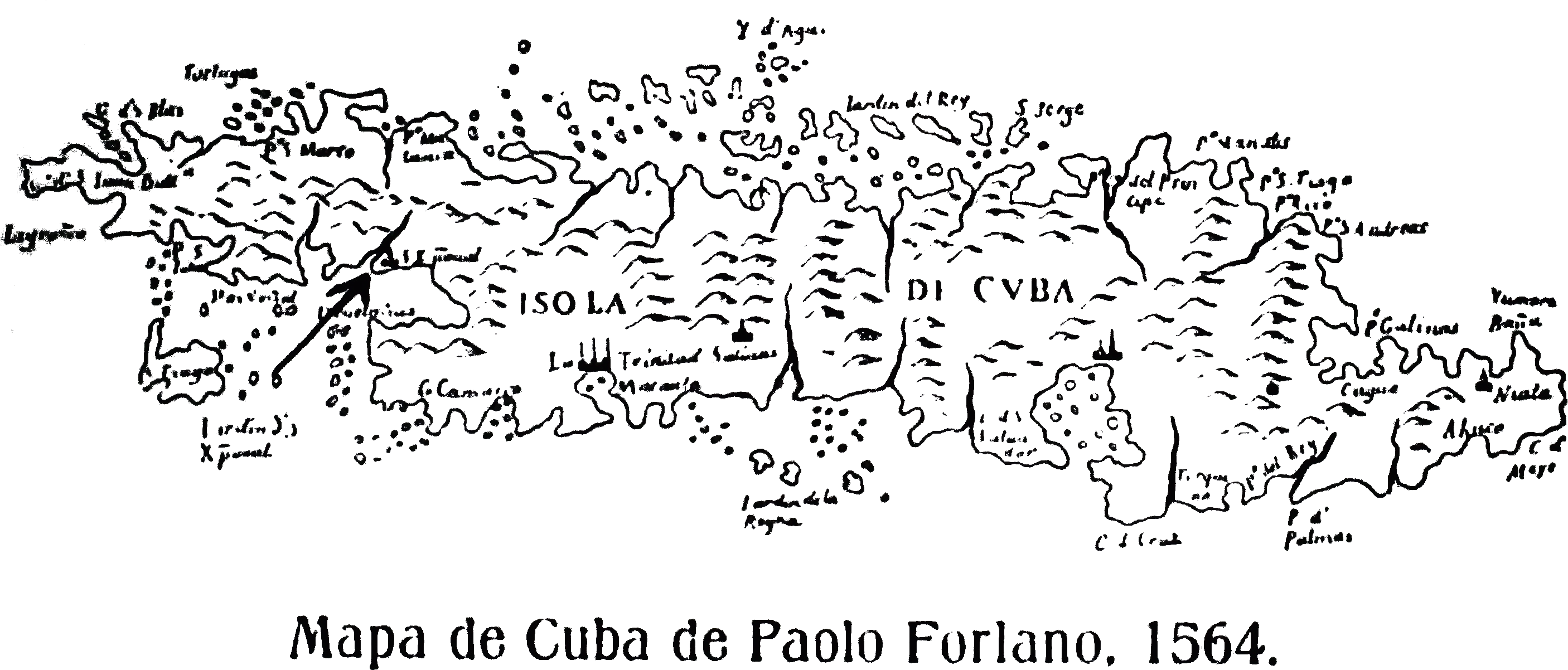

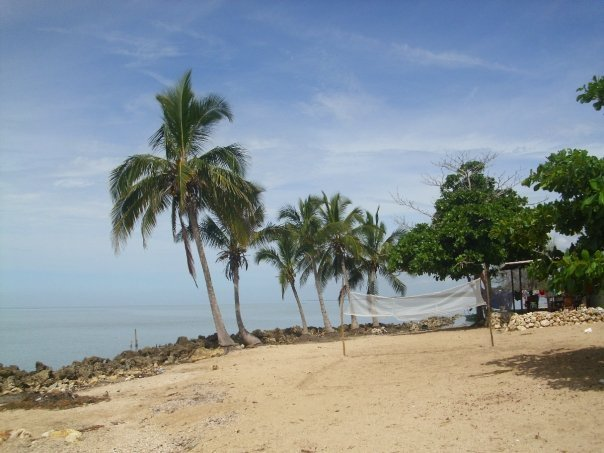
The coast at Playa Mayabeque

The original village of Havana (San Cristobal de La Habana) was founded on the shores of the Mayabeque river close to Playa Mayabeque in 1514 or 1515 by Diego Velázquez de Cuéllar, before being moved to the north coast in 1519. As a result of this, the coat of arms of Melena del Sur bears the Latin phrase "Hic Est Condit Havana Primo" (English: Here was founded Havana the first time).

In 1956, under the leadership of Serafín García Menocal, president of the Consejo Nacional Scouts de Cuba (National Scouting Council of Cuba), the Scouts of Cuba bought land at Mayabeque for their national training grounds, the Campo Escuela Nacional Mayabeque (Mayabeque National Camp School). The school was abandoned in 1961, and is now submerged under the Pedroso reservoir.

== Gallery ==
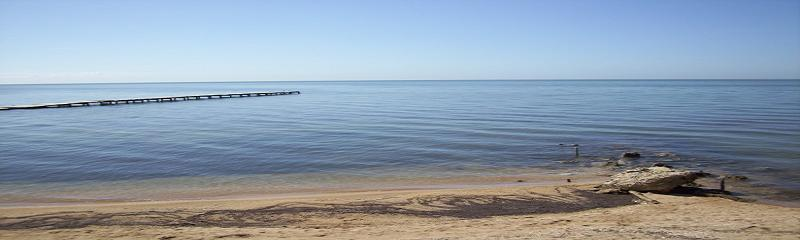
Playa Mayabeque
