= Salvador Fernández Beltrán =

Salvador Fernández Beltrán D.J.C.

Deputy Camp Chief of Gilwell

Salvador Fernández Beltrán D.J.C. (born at Matanzas, Cuba – 1987 in Venezuela) was among the first in the Americas to receive Wood Badge training, at Gilwell Park, England. He was the first to receive honorary appointment as Deputy Camp Chief of Gilwell. With this influence, the Scouts of Cuba began to use short trousers like those worn by the English.

Fernandez Beltrán was known for his work within the Scouts of Cuba, but served World Scouting in several capacities. With the support of the Boy Scouts of America, he was appointed the International Bureau's Traveling Commissioner for Latin America in November 1947, the first professional Scout executive, whose operations center was first in Mexico and then in Cuba. He later served as General Secretary of the Inter-American Advisory Committee, assisting in the creation of the InterAmerican Scout Office, the divisional office of the World Scout Bureau of the World Organization of the Scout Movement, founded and maintained with headquarters in Havana from 1946 to 1960. In 1948 Fernández Beltrán and J. S. Wilson took a six-week tour of the Americas, for assessment and planning, covering 23,000 miles and 110 hours of flying time. In 1955 he held the first Wood Badge training in Venezuela. At the beginning of the 1960s Fernandez Beltrán was appointed to the office of Deputy Secretary of the World Organization of the Scout Movement in Geneva, Switzerland.

Fernández Beltrán was awarded the Bronze Wolf, the only distinction of the World Organization of the Scout Movement, awarded by the World Scout Committee for exceptional services to world Scouting, in 1957.

He retired to Venezuela where he died in 1987.

== Published works ==
- RSA. EL GRUPO SCOUT, Mexico, Scout Interamericana, April 1964, Escultismo, publicaciones periodicas
