= Mayabeque River =

River in western Cuba

Coordinates: 22°40′26.6″N 82°8′48.72″W

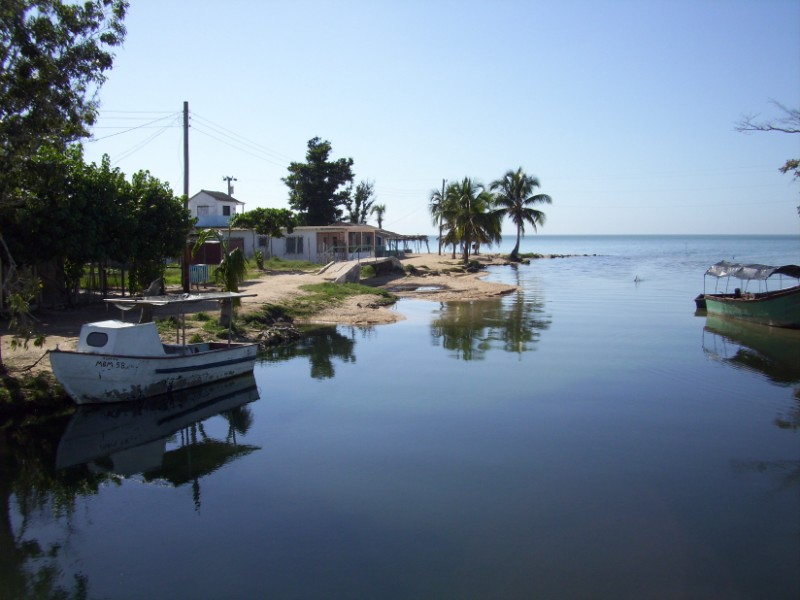
Mayabeque River outlet to the Gulf of Batabano

Mayabeque River (alternately Rio Mayabeque) (Spanish: Río Mayabeque) is a river of western Cuba, considered the largest in the southwestern watershed of Cuba, with an extensive fluvial network that encompasses the municipalities of Güines, San Jose de las Lajas, Jaruco, Madruga, and Melena del Sur. The old outlet in Melena del Sur (now connected with the main river only by irrigation canals) is named Antiguo Mayabeque. The Antiguo (ancient) Mayabeque is still navigable by small boats in the last 5 km (3.1 mi).

Mayabeque was the largest river in the former province of Havana, and presently (2011) is the main river of the Mayabeque Province, named after the river. It runs from north to south and on its banks is the important and historic city of Güines. Its cold waters are a source of satisfaction for bathers in the summer time, ending at the shores of Mayabeque Beach in Melena del Sur.

== Vegetation ==
Among the plants that grow on the banks of the river you can find plenty of trees and shrubs of different species as the mangrove which gives a remarkable average color red to its waters.

== History ==
The earliest mention of river data Mayabeque 1509, just 17 years after the discovery of Cuba, where some Indians had been referred to the father Houses in a place farther west from where it was Panfilo de Narvaez with their archers, the people were Indian in which they were captives, some Spanish people, two women and one man. It is believed that the original Havana (San Cristóbal de La Habana) village was founded in 1514 or 1515 on the banks of the Mayabeque (most likely on the Antiguo Mayabeque) a few kilometers from the south coast.

=== Mayabeque National Camp School ===
In 1956, under the leadership of Serafín García Menocal, president of the Consejo Nacional Scouts de Cuba (National Council), the Scouts of Cuba bought the national training grounds Campo Escuela Nacional Mayabeque near Catalina de Güines within 50 km (31 mi) of the capital. The National Camp School was dedicated to the training of Scouters and for Scout camping. The Field School was abandoned in 1961, and at the moment is under the water of Pedroso reservoir.

== Gallery ==
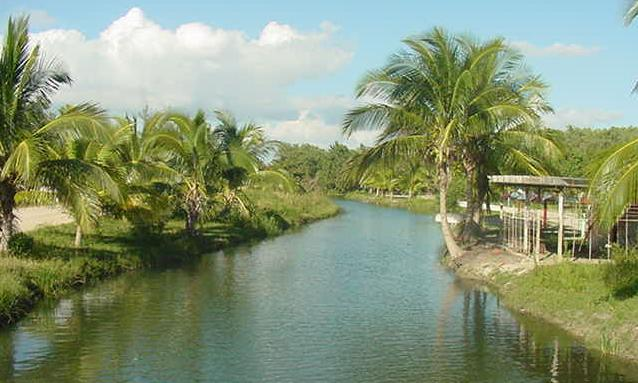

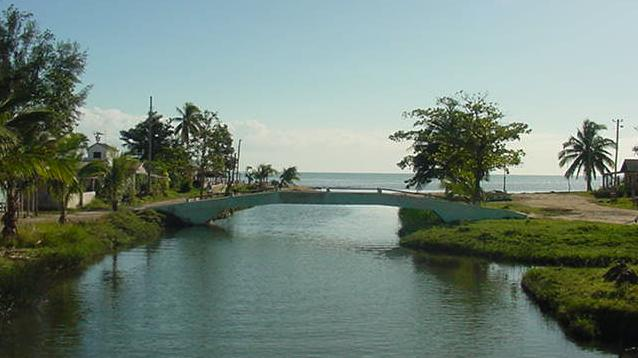

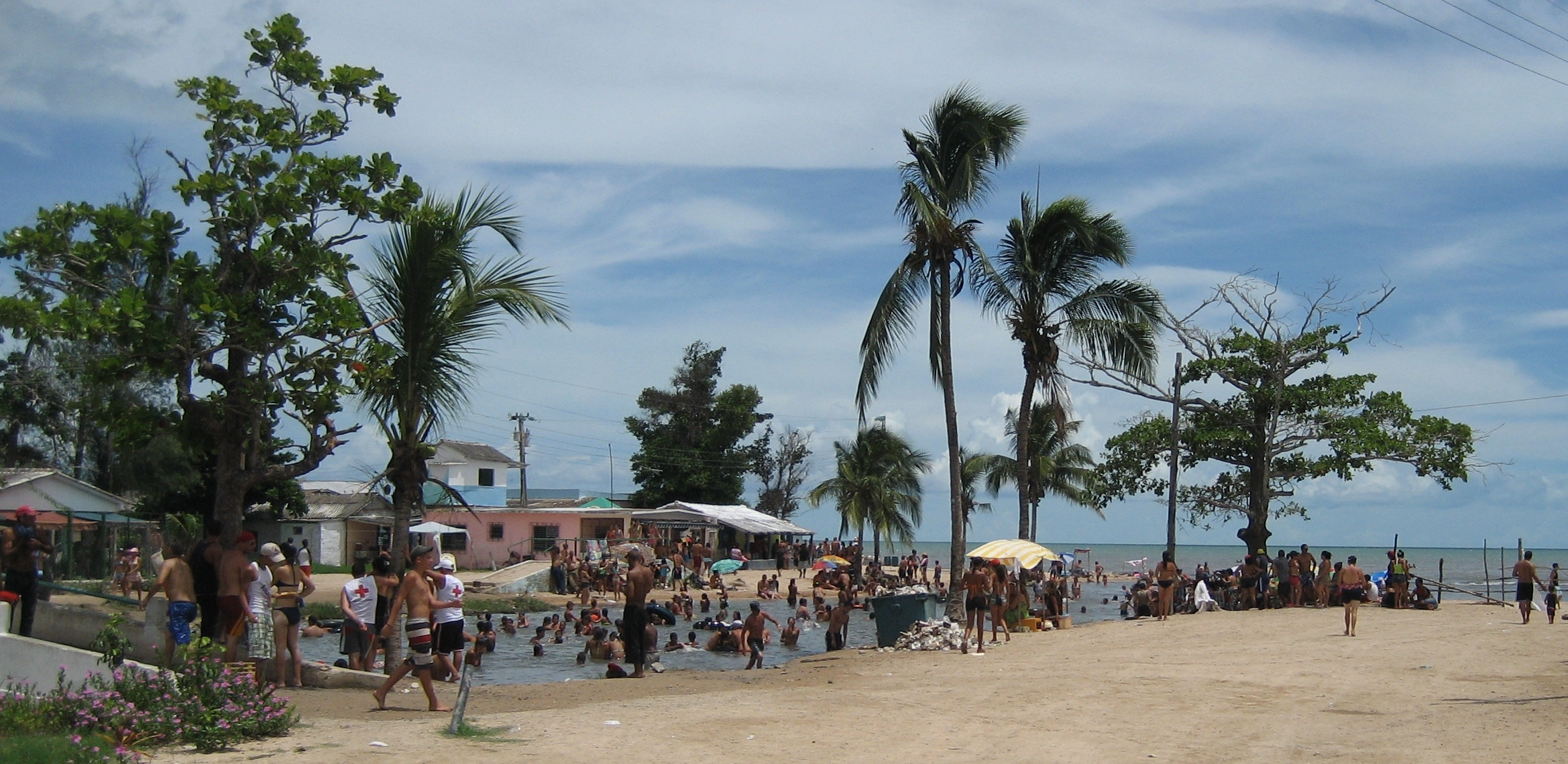
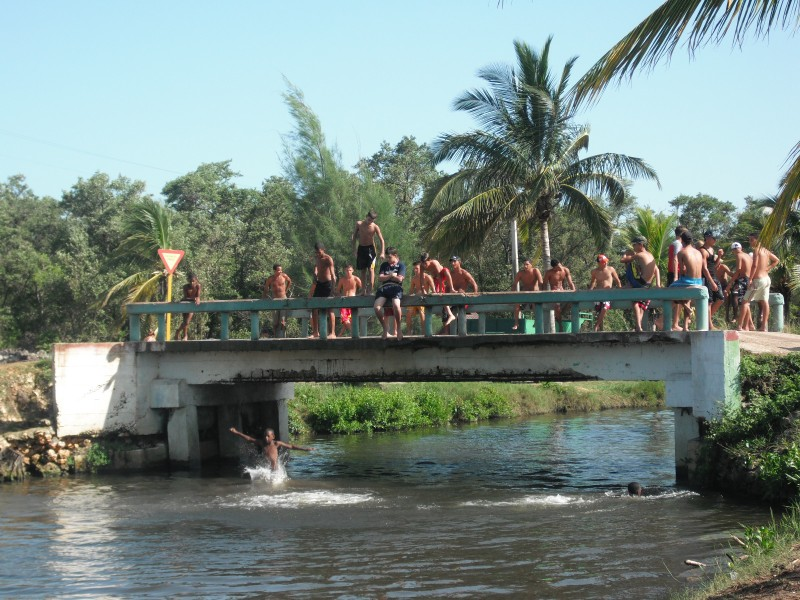

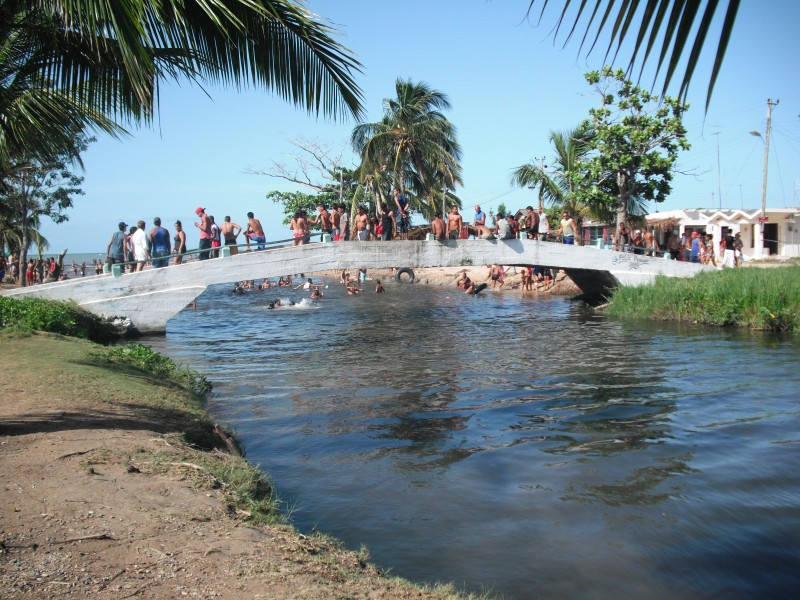

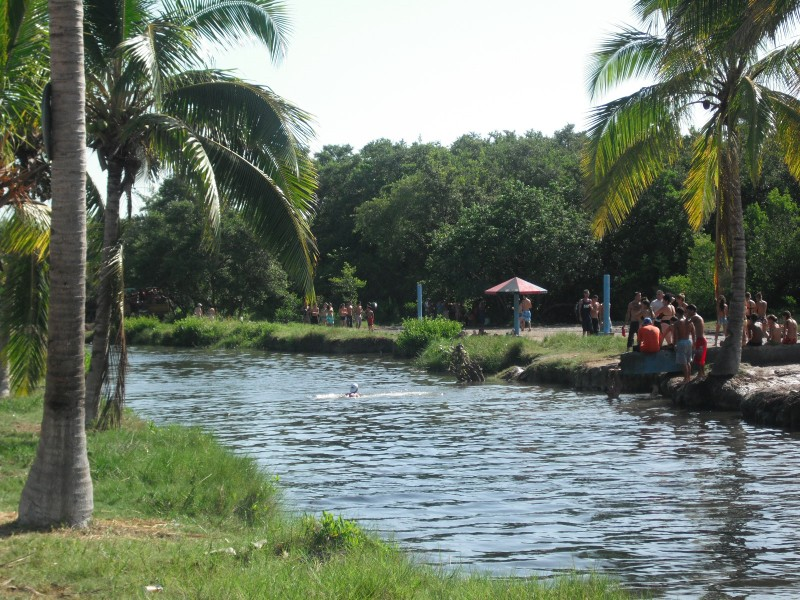

== See also ==
- Rivers of Cuba
