= Victoria Loustalot =

American writer of memoir and essays

- Born: Sacramento, California, United States
- Writing career
- Period: 2006–present
- Genre: Memoir

== Biography ==
Loustalot was raised in Sacramento, California and graduated from Columbia University with a B.A. in English. At age 21, an essay she wrote about her father's death was published in The New York Times "Modern Love" column. She was offered a nonfiction writing fellowship from Columbia University. She accepted and went on to earn her M.F.A. in writing from Columbia's School of the Arts.

Her work has appeared in numerous print and online publications, including The New Yorker Women's Wear Daily, The Onion, Publishers Weekly, The Huffington Post, and The New York Times. Her first book, This Is How You Say Goodbye, a memoir about her unusual childhood and traveling alone in her early twenties, was published in 2013.

She lives in Los Angeles.
