= Serafín García Menocal =

Cuban scouting leader (1911–2003)

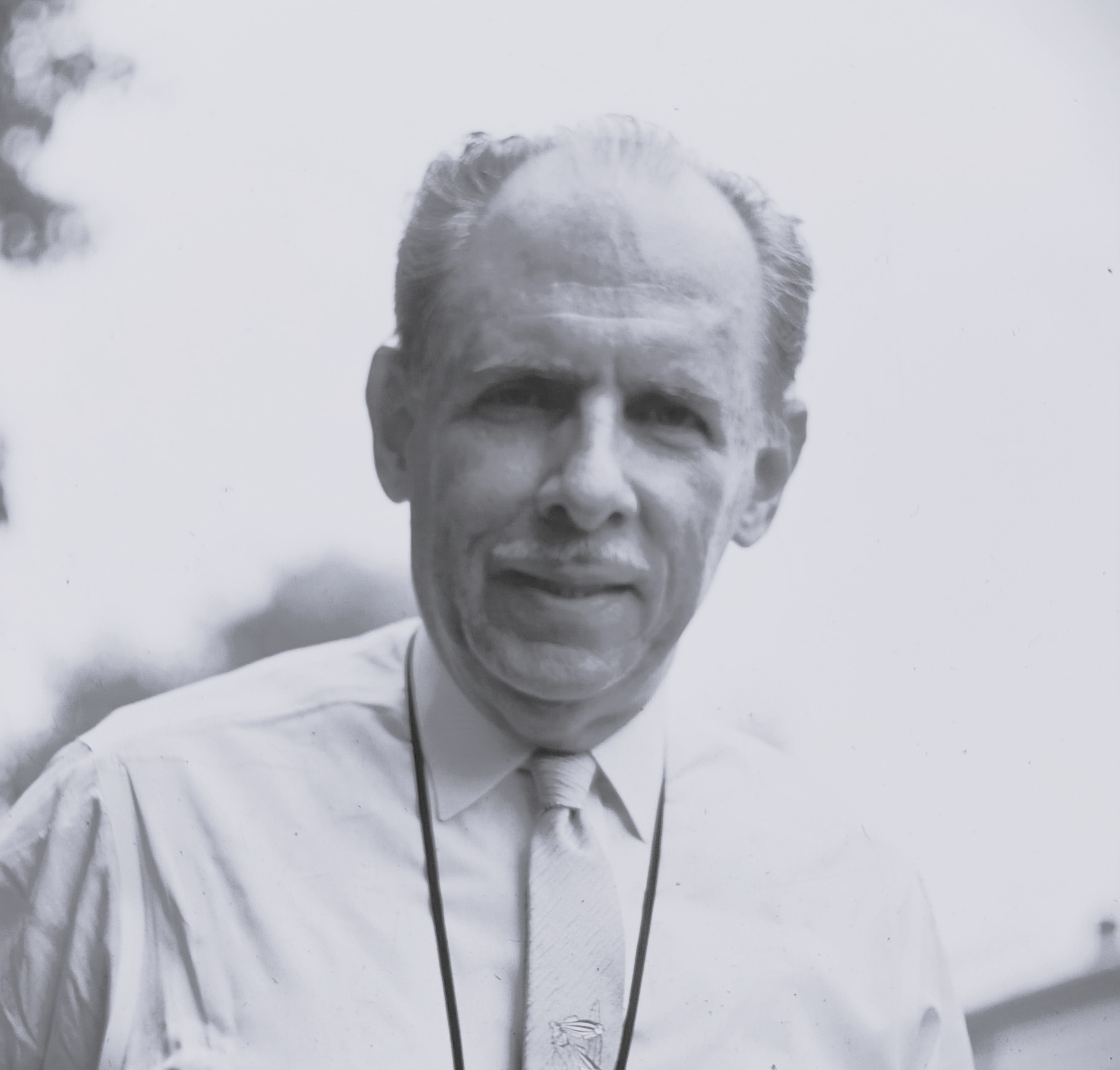
- Born: Serafín García Menocal; 25 May 1911; Havana, Cuba
- Died: 9 October 2003 (aged 92); West Palm Beach, Florida, U.S.
- Education: University of Havana
- Occupations: Engineer, Public Utility Executive, Author, Public Speaker, Scout Leader
- Spouse: Rosario Valdes Balsinde
- Children: 5

Serafín García Menocal (25 May 1911 – 9 October 2003) was a Cuban-American public utility executive, political author, and public speaker. He served as Vice President and General Manager of the Cuban Electric Company (Compañia Cubana de Electricidad), President and General Manager of Panama's Public Utility (Compañia Panameña de Fuerza y Luz), and President of the National Council of the Scouts in Cuba.

Witness to the nationalization of private property and erosion of personal liberties by the Communist regime, he immigrated to the United States in 1959. He dedicated years of public speaking to shed light on the Marxist game plan to divide classes and undermine democracy, warning that what happened in Cuba could happen here.

== Early life and education ==
Menocal was born in Havana, Cuba, the son of Gustavo Garcia Menocal and Emma Ferrer e Infante. He was born into one of the most distinguished families in Latin America. His father, Gustavo Garcia Menocal was a Representative in Congress from the Province of Matanzas, and Lieutenant Colonel in the Cuban War of independence. His uncle, Mario Garcia Menocal, was the third President of Cuba. At the age of five, the unexpected death of his father left him and his younger brother under the care of his widowed mother. Menocal earned a degree in Electrical Engineering from the University of Havana in 1937. He married Rosario Valdes Balsinde.

== Career ==
Menocal began employment with the Cuban Electric Company in July 1938, and worked his way from the lowest levels of the company to become the first Cuban-born Vice-President and General Manager of the national electric company. In this capacity, Menocal took an active role in the planning and development of the country's electric industry. In 1959, Menocal resigned from his position in protest of the expropriation of the company's properties, and widespread abuses of civil liberties being perpetrated by the Castro revolutionary regime.

In voluntary exile from Cuba, Menocal assumed duties of a Vice President in the New York offices of American & Foreign Power. In September 1968, he was promoted to Vice President and General Manager of Compañia Panameña de Fuerza y Luz, the electric, telephone, and gas public utility of the Republic of Panama. He was subsequently promoted to President on 8 January 1970, and held this position until the nationalization of the utility by the revolutionary government in 1972.

== Public service ==
Menocal's public service career in Cuba include Vice President of the National Electrical Engineer Association, Director of the Cuban Society of Engineers, President of the Lions Club of Camaguey, member of the American Institute of Electrical Engineers, and President of the National Council of the Scouts in Cuba. In 1956, under his leadership, Asociación de Scouts de Cuba bought the national training ground Campo Escuela Nacional Mayabeque close to the Mayabeque River, near Catalina de Güines in Havana Province, within 50 km (31 mi) of the capital.

From 1961 through 1968 he raised awareness of the experiences of the Cuban Revolution through public speaking engagements, eventually writing his story in a book, The Lesson the United States Can Learn from Cuba. He cautioned that it was not the illiterate or poor who were responsible for the downfall of Cuba, but rather a segment of the middle class, academia and a naive group of wealthy individuals too absorbed in their pursuits to take the trouble to understand the underlying Communist game plan and the true intentions of those who sought to lead them.

== Published works ==
- The Lesson the United States Can Learn from Cuba. (Princeton, New Jersey: Princeton University Press) (New York: MM Wilson) International relations. US relations. Cuba. A speech of 3 January 1964.
