= Scouts on Stamps Society International =

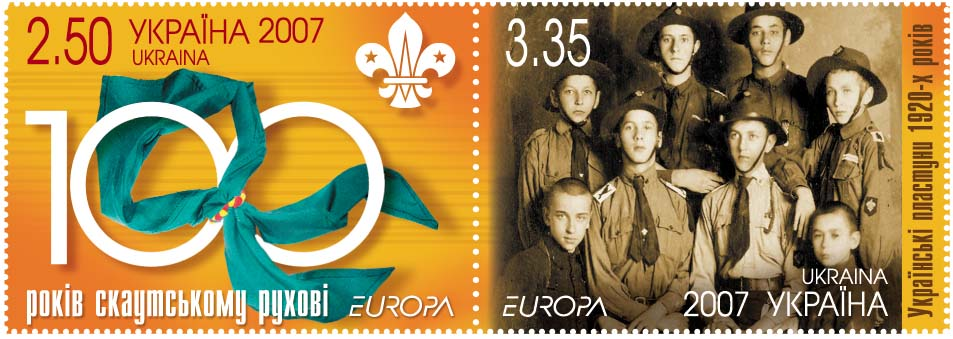
Ukrainian Scout postage stamp commemorating the 100th anniversary of Scouting

The Scouts on Stamps Society International, or SOSSI was created as a response to stamp collectors who want to specialize in the field of Scouting in their collections in particular.

Since the advent of Scouting in 1907, Scouts have been depicted on the postage stamps of almost every nation during different times of their political development.

Individual nations have organizations for Scout philatelists as well.

== See also ==
- Scouting memorabilia collecting
