= Güines =

- Municipality
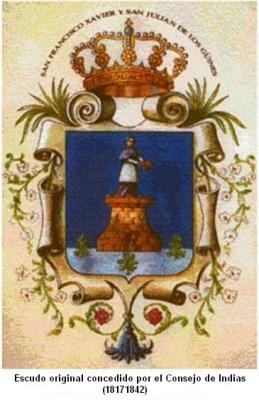
- Coat of arms

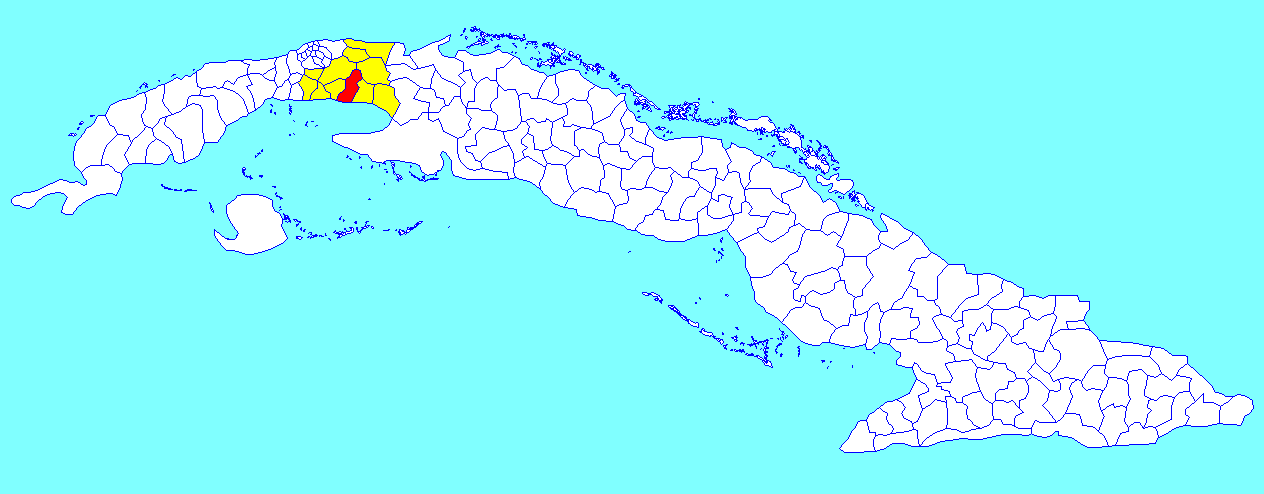
- Güines municipality (red) within Mayabeque Province (yellow) and Cuba
- Coordinates: 22°50′51″N 82°01′25″W
- Country: Cuba
- Province: Mayabeque
- Founded: 1735
- Established: 1815 (Municipality)

Area
  - Total: 445 km^{2} (172 sq mi)
- Elevation: 65 m (213 ft)

Population (2022)
  - Total: 65,037
  - Density: 146/km^{2} (379/sq mi)
- Demonym: Güinero(a)
- Time zone: UTC-5 (EST)
- Area code: +53-62

Güines is a municipality and town in the Mayabeque Province of Cuba. It is located 50 km (31 mi) southeast of Havana, next to the Mayabeque River. It is the most populated town, but not the capital, of its province.

== History ==
The city was founded in 1737 by the Spanish. Prior to the arrival of the Spanish, what is now Güines was part of a region ruled by the Indian chief Habaguanex.

One of the earliest mentions of the word Güines is in 1598, when Don Diego de Rivera or Ribera was awarded a land grant for Los Güines Corral.

Güines can be considered one of the primary points of Cuba's transformation into a sugar-producing slave society in the wake of the Haitian Revolution. Its demographics radically changed as a result. As the historian Ada Ferrer explains, "people classified as white had accounted for about three-quarters of the population in 1775" but "by the 1820s, they constituted less than 38 percent."

In 1837, a railway was opened from Havana. It was the first in Cuba and Spain, and one of the earliest in the Americas.

== Geography ==
The municipality is divided into the barrios of Catalina, Norte, Rural Primero, Rural Segundo, Rural Tercero, Rural Cuarto and Sur.

== Demographics ==
In 2022, the municipality of Güines had a population of 65,037. With a total area of 445 km^{2} (172 sq mi). It has a population density of 150/km^{2} (390/sq mi).

== Notable people ==
- Cristina Ayala (1856–1936), poet
- Julio Moreno (1921–1987), baseball player
- Tata Güines (1930–2008), musician
- Roberto Torres (born 1940), musician
- Enrique Ramos Suárez (born 1930), poet
- Leinier Domínguez (born 1983), chess player
- Alberto Hernández Reyes, landscape painter
- Rigoberto Hernandez, American chemist and academic

== See also ==
- Municipalities of Cuba
- List of cities in Cuba
- Güines Municipal Museum
