= Kenneth Symington =

British-Cuban civic leader

National Executive Commissioner of the Asociación de Scouts de Cuba

Kenneth A. Symington (born 1932) is a Cuban-born chemical engineer, business executive, author, and literary translator. He served as the National Executive Commissioner of the Asociación de Scouts de Cuba and participated in cave exploration and speleological research. He later worked in corporate management in the United States and translated works of Latin American literature into English.

== Biography ==
Born in Cuba to English and Cuban parents, he lived in Cuba until he moved to the United States to attend college at Rensselaer Polytechnic Institute, where he graduated with a degree in Chemical Engineering. He subsequently worked as an executive for many years in several major American corporations. After retirement, he lived in California, and owned and operated several small businesses. His credits include several books, some translated from Spanish to English and published in the USA.

== Career ==
Symington began his professional career in chemical engineering and industrial operations. In Cuba, he worked for Industria Sanitarios Nacional, S.A., in San José de las Lajas. His responsibilities included industrial production and engineering.

He subsequently worked for Pennwalt Corporation, a chemical and industrial products company, from 1965 to 1982. During this period, he held management positions involving international operations, marketing, business development, and division management. His work included establishing overseas operations, managing business units, and overseeing acquisitions and investment planning.

Symington held leadership and training roles in the Asociación de Scouts de Cuba, the national scouting organization that operated in Cuba before its activities ceased in the early 1960s. He served as a training commissioner before becoming its National Executive Commissioner.

In his scouting work, he participated in professional leadership training and helped organize the association's administrative and regional activities. He also attended training at Gilwell Park in England and took part in international scouting courses.

Symington was the association's last National Executive Commissioner before the organization ceased operating in Cuba. His tenure coincided with the political changes following the Cuban Revolution and the departure of scouting leaders from the country.

== Scientific works ==
Symington participated in cave exploration in Cuba and was associated with the Cuban Speleological Society. His work included explorations of caves in eastern Cuba and contributions to the documentation of underground geological formations.

In 1955, he co-authored, with Cuban geographer and explorer Antonio Núñez Jiménez, the article “Caverns of St. Tomas,” published in the Bulletin of the National Speleological Society.

== Writing and translation ==
Symington has written books combining personal recollections, stories, reflections, and observations. His publications include Hypomnemata: Stories, Fables, Memories (2010) and The Invisible Theater: An Experiment in Group Stage Presentation (2020).

He also worked as a literary translator, translating Spanish-language works into English. His translation of César Calvo's novel Las tres mitades de Ino Moxo y otros brujos de la Amazonía was published in English in 1995 as The Three Halves of Ino Moxo: Teachings of the Wizard of the Upper Amazon. The novel explores Amazonian traditions, shamanism, and Indigenous knowledge.

His other published work includes The Path Along the Way: Stories, Inventions, Incidents, and Encounters Along A Long Life, a collection of personal narratives and recollections.

== Publications ==
- "Caverns of St. Tomas", Antonio Nunez Jimenez and Kenneth A. Symington, Bulletin of the National Speleological Society - ISSN 0146-9517 Number 17: 2-7 - December 1955
- Symington, K.A. (2010). Hypomnemata: Stories, Fables, Memories. Xlibris US. ISBN 978-1-4628-1547-0.
- Symington, K.A. (2019). The Path Along the Way: Stories, Inventions, Incidents, and Encounters Along A Long Life. Rushmore Press LLC. ISBN 978-1-950818-26-6.
- Symington, Kenneth A. (February 7, 2020). The Invisible Theater: An Experiment in Group Stage Presentation. Dorrance Publishing. ISBN 978-1-64530-260-5.

=== Translations ===
- Calvo, César (1995). The Three Halves of Ino Moxo: Teachings of the Wizard of the Upper Amazon. Translated by Symington, Kenneth. Inner Traditions/Bear. ISBN 978-0-89281-519-7.
- Escohotado, Antonio (May 1, 1999). A Brief History of Drugs: From the Stone Age to the Stoned Age. Translated by Symington, Kenneth. Simon and Schuster. ISBN 978-1-59477-579-6.
