= S&P 500 futures =

Financial contracts for investors

S&P 500 futures are financial futures which allow an investor to hedge with or speculate on the future value of various components of the S&P 500 Index market index. S&P 500 futures contracts were first introduced by the Chicago Mercantile Exchange in 1982. The CME added the e-mini option in 1997. The bundle of stocks in the S&P 500 is, per the name, composed of stocks of 500 large companies.

== Derived futures ==
All of the S&P derived future contracts are a product of the Chicago Mercantile Exchange (CME). They expire quarterly (March, June, September, and December), and are traded on the CME Globex exchange nearly 24 hours a day, from Sunday afternoon to Friday afternoon.

- S&P 500 Futures (ticker: SP) contract's minimum tick is 0.25 index points = $62.50. While the performance bond requirements vary from broker to broker, the CME requires $11,500 to maintain the position.
- E-Mini S&P 500 Futures (ticker: ES) contract's minimum tick is 0.25 index points = $12.50
- Micro E-Mini S&P 500 Futures (ticker: MES) contract's minimum tick is 0.25 index points = $1.25

== Contracts ==
S&P Futures contracts are used to speculate, hedge, or offset investment risk by commodity owners (i.e., farmers), or portfolios with undesirable risk exposure offset by the futures position.

== Quotes ==
CME Group provides live feeds for S&P Futures and these are published on various websites like Bloomberg.com, CNN Money, and SPFutures.org.

== Trading leverage ==
S&P Futures trade with a multiplier, sized to correspond to $250 per point per contract. If the S&P Futures are trading at 6,000, a single futures contract would have a market value of $1,500,000. For every 1 point the S&P 500 Index fluctuates, the S&P Futures contract will increase or decrease $250.

== US tax advantages ==
In the United States broad-based index futures receive special tax treatment under the IRS 60/40 rule. Stocks held longer than one year qualify for favorable capital gains tax treatment, while stocks held one year or less are taxed at ordinary income. Proceeds from index futures contracts traded in the short term are taxed 60 percent at the favorable capital gains rate and only 40 percent as ordinary income. Losses on NASDAQ futures can be carried back up to 3 years, and tax reporting is significantly simpler, as they qualify as Section 1256 Contracts.

== See also ==
- E-mini
- E-mini S&P
- Dow futures
- NASDAQ futures
- Derivative (finance)
- 1256 Contract
