= Commodity tick =

Futures exchanges establish a minimum amount that the price of a commodity can fluctuate upward or downward. This minimum fluctuation (trade increment) is known as a tick or commodity tick. Hence, a tick is any fluctuation in the price of a security.

Each futures contract has a different size, quantity, valuation etc., so each tick size that can be applied to anyone's futures contract, is dependent on the previous variables. Tick size is important as it determines the possible prices available. For example, each "tick" for the grain market (soybeans, corn and wheat) is 0.25 cents per bushel, on one 5,000-bushel futures contract.

Tick values for some popular contracts (as of June 2010)
Futures Product	Contract Size	Tick Size	Tick Value
E-Mini S&P 500 (CME)	$50 x index	0.25	$12.50
E-Mini NASDAQ (CME)	$20 x index	0.25	$5.00
Australian Dollar	A$100,000	0.0001	$10.00
British Pound	£62,500	0.0001	$6.25
Canadian Dollar (CME)	C$100,000	0.0001	$10.00
Euro FX (CME)	€125,000	0.0001	$12.50
Japanese Yen	¥12,500,000	0.000001	$12.50
Mexican Peso	MP 500,000	0.000025	$12.50
New Zealand Dollar	NZ$100,000	0.0001	$10.00
Swiss Franc	SF 125,000	0.0001	$12.50
30 Day Fed Funds	$5,000,000 (annualized)	0.00005	$20.835
2 Year Treasury Note	$200,000	1/4 of 1/32	$15.625
5 Year Treasury Note	$100,000	1/4 of 1/32	$7.8125
10 Year Treasury Note	$100,000	1/2 of 1/32	$15.625
30 Year Treasury Bond	$100,000	1/32	$31.25
Gold (CBOT)	100 oz	$0.10/oz	$10.00
Silver (CBOT)	5,000 oz	$0.005/oz	$25.00
Silver (COMEX miNY)	1000 oz	$0.0125/oz	$12.50
E-mini Crude Oil	500 Barrels	$0.025	$12.50
E-mini Natural Gas	2,500 million BTU	$0.005	$12.50

== See also ==
- Percentage in point (PIP)
- Tick size
- NASDAQ futures
