= International reactions to the 2016 United States presidential election =

International reactions to the 2016 election of Republican Donald Trump emerged from around the world, including states, other institutions, and people.

== States ==
=== Africa ===
==== Algeria ====
Algerian president Abdelaziz Bouteflika congratulated Trump, stressing the quality of friendship relations and cooperation between Algeria and the U.S.. He issued a statement saying: "The American people, through the presidential election of November 8, 2016, has given you their votes to become their president."

==== Egypt ====
President Abdel Fattah el-Sisi congratulated Trump and said "Egypt is looking forward to seeing a new spirit brought to the presidential term of President Trump in terms of Egyptian-American relations, including more cooperation and coordination for the mutual benefit of the American and Egyptian people." The two had met during the opening of the seventy-first session of the United Nations General Assembly. A statement from his office read that he had personally congratulated Trump during a telephone call and that he was the first world leader to do so. "The U.S. president-elect Donald Trump expressed his utmost appreciation to the president, pointing out that his was the first international call he had received to congratulate him on winning the election." The result was also welcomed by many Egyptian members of Parliament. Later, el-Sisi stated that Trump's actions as US president would likely be different from his rhetoric prior to the election, saying "let's not jump into conclusions or worry".

==== Kenya ====
President Uhuru Kenyatta sent a congratulatory message to Trump and said:

The American people have spoken, and they have spoken clearly. The ties that bind Kenya and the United States of America are close and strong. They are old and based on the values that we hold dear: in democracy, in the rule of law, and in the equality of peoples.

==== Mauritius ====
Mauritian president Ameenah Gurib wrote on Twitter: "#Donald Trump's victory isn't the most terrifying news today. There's something even worse." She posted an article from The Independent with the heading "Climate change may be escalating so fast it could be 'game over', scientists warn."

==== Morocco ====
King Mohammed VI sent a message of congratulations to Trump and expressed his best wishes for the success of the Trump administration to lead the American people towards further progress and prosperity. He said he wanted to enhance dialogue, coordination and consultation particularly in security to "counter all forms of extremism, violence and terrorism and to help find peaceful solutions to conflicts and tensions around the globe." He also expressed his appreciation for the United States' "continued support and keen interest in the major structural reforms initiated in the kingdom with a view to promoting Morocco's comprehensive development, as well as in efforts aimed at achieving peace and stability in the region."

==== Nigeria ====
Nigerian president Muhammadu Buhari congratulated Trump and American citizens. He also stated he looked forward to working together to strengthen friendly relations between Nigeria and the U.S..

==== Sahrawi Arab Democratic Republic ====
Sahrawi President Brahim Ghali sent a congratulatory message to Trump and expressed his good wishes. He stated, "On behalf of the Sahrawi people, I write to extend to you my sincere congratulations upon your election as President of the United States of America. The electoral process was a triumph of democracy, and I am delighted both for you and for the people of the United States."

==== Seychelles ====
Seychellois president Danny Faure congratulated Trump. In a statement, he wished Trump "every success as he prepares to discharge the important duties which lay ahead" and also highlighted what he termed as "excellent and steady progression in cooperation" in various fields of interest between Seychelles and the US.

==== Somalia ====
Somalian president Hassan Sheikh Mohamud congratulated Trump and looks forward to improve further diplomatic relations between Somalia and the United States.

==== South Africa ====
President Jacob Zuma congratulated Trump and conveyed his best wishes. He also looked forward to working with Trump to build on the strong relations that exist between the two countries. He underlined that "South Africa further looked forward to working closely with the new administration in the United States in promoting peace, security, and prosperity around the world, especially on the African continent."

- Democratic Alliance Shadow Minister of International Relations and Cooperation Stevens Mokgalapa issued a statement that read:

Donald Trump's victory in the 2016 US Presidential Election illustrates what can happen when a large contingent of a population feel excluded from the economy and from political institutions.

Without a growing and inclusive economy, and without independent political institutions that work, radical and regressive political bodies are fuelled by the frustration and discontent of citizens and are able to mobilise people based on their differences, rather than shared values.

This means that those of us at the moderate centre of politics need to work harder to reach all citizens who want a better future, with our message of Freedom, Fairness, and Opportunity. Moreover, we need to work hard to ensure that populist politics – whether on the left or the right – does not prevail.

The rise of divisive nationalism that has re-emerged globally over the last few years threatens the hard-fought progress the world has made over the last half a century. Progress towards universal human rights, international trade, and cooperation, non-racialism, and non-sexism. It is this progress which we must fight to protect.

We cannot allow the politics of "us" and "them" to divide us further along the lines of race, ethnicity, nationality, sex, and gender.

Rather, we must strengthen the centre, in order for democratic societies based on the values of fairness, equality, and tolerance, to thrive and to be leaders in the world.

==== Sudan ====
President Omar al-Bashir congratulated Trump as a Trump adviser had pledged to not lift sanctions on the east African country. Al-Bashir said, "I am pleased to extend to Your Excellency in my name and on behalf of the Government and [the] people of the Republic of Sudan warmest and most sincere congratulations on your election as President of the United States of America." He further expressed that he was looking forward to working with Trump to "upgrade relations between our two friendly countries."

==== Tanzania ====
Tanzanian president John Pombe Magufuli congratulated Trump via Twitter and assured him of continued friendship and cooperation of his country with the U.S..

==== Uganda ====
Ugandan president Yoweri Museveni congratulated Trump by writing on Twitter: "I look forward to working with him like I have done with his predecessors."

==== Zimbabwe ====
Information and Communication Minister Chris Mushohwe hoped the new U.S. administration would "restore sound relations between Harare and Washington". He added: "Zimbabwe respects the wishes of the people of America ... Our country has never had any quarrel with America and does [not] need to have any quarrel with them." He further hoped Trump would "restore our relationship and we will never become an enemy of America."

==== Other ====
Burundian president Pierre Nkurunziza and Ghanaian President John Dramani Mahama posted their Twitter messages congratulating Trump.

=== Asia ===
==== Afghanistan ====
President Ashraf Ghani congratulated Trump and said that relations between the two states would further improve under him.

- Taliban spokesman Zabihullah Mujahid issued a statement that read a Trump administration "should allow Afghans to become a free nation and have relationships with other countries based on non-interference in each other's affairs."

==== Armenia ====
Armenian president Serzh Sargsyan congratulated Trump and wrote "I have no doubt, that under your able leadership the United States will achieve further progress and advancement in the years to come."

==== Azerbaijan ====
Azerbaijani president Ilham Aliyev congratulated Trump in a statement that read: "I extend to You my sincere congratulations on your election as President of the United States of America. Your victory in the election is indicative of the confidence in and support for You of the friendly people of the United States."

==== Bahrain ====
Bahraini prince Salman bin Hamad Al Khalifa sent a diplomatic cable of congratulations and good wishes to Trump and wished him more success and expressed Bahrain's aspiration to "boost and consolidate the distinctive historic ties between the two countries and peoples and to develop the bilateral cooperation in all fields."

==== Bangladesh ====
Prime Minister Sheikh Hasina issued a statement to congratulate Trump, saying:

I am confident that under your leadership, the existing bilateral relation between our two friendly nations would be further strengthened. I look forward to working closely with you for advancing our bilateral and multilateral interests and contributing to create a safe and secured world, where our coming generations could live and continue to prosper peacefully. I cordially invite you and Mrs Melania Trump to visit Bangladesh at a mutually convenient time and see for yourself the phenomenal development that took place in Bangladesh in the recent years.

==== Cambodia ====
Prime Minister Hun Sen congratulated Trump saying:

I would like to congratulate His Excellency Donald Trump for achieving victory in the US presidential election ... American voters have shown their choice to elect your excellency ... My support for your candidacy is not wrong either.

==== China ====
President Xi Jinping congratulated Trump and said he looked forward to working together to promote ties in a "constructive" way to avoid conflict and confrontation. He added that both countries shared common interests and shouldered a "special and important responsibility in upholding world peace. I highly value China-U.S. relations and am looking forward to working with you to expand cooperation in all fields, including in bilateral, regional and global aspects." He says he expects they would "manage differences in a constructive way, in the spirit of non-conflict, non-confrontation, mutual respect, cooperation and win-win." In a phone conversation with Trump, Xi said that cooperation was "the only correct choice." A statement from Trump's presidential transition office read that "the leaders established a clear sense of mutual respect for one another."

- Hong Kong chief executive Leung Chun-ying congratulated Trump and said the SAR government looks forward to further deepening their links with the United States.
- Tibet - India-resident the Dalai Lama congratulated Trump, saying the world places great hope in the democratic vision and leadership of the U.S. In a congratulatory letter the next day, he said the Tibetan people and himself were honored with the support received by respective U.S. presidents and fellow Americans in the Tibetan people's endeavour to protect and preserve ancient Buddhist culture.
  - Tibetan prime minister-in-exile Lobsang Sangay also congratulated Trump on his election victory. "I am grateful for the people and government of the U.S. for hosting the Tibetan spiritual leader His Holiness the Dalai Lama, at the White House on many occasions." Sangay added that the Tibetan people are immensely grateful to the U.S. for applauding and supporting a "middle-way" approach and encouraging dialogue between the Dalai Lama and Chinese authorities to lower tensions and resolve our differences.

==== India ====
Prime Minister Narendra Modi congratulated Trump and wrote that "we appreciated the friendship you have articulated toward India during your campaign." He added that he looks forward to working with him. During a campaign rally to appeal to Indian-Americans, Trump adapted a slogan from Modi's own campaign that changed from "ab ki baar, Modi Sarkar" to "ab ki baar, Trump sarkar" (now is the time for a Modi/Trump government).

==== Indonesia ====
President Joko Widodo congratulated Trump and said that "Indonesia will continue its mutually beneficial cooperation with the United States." He also invited Trump "to continue to work together to build peace and create prosperity for the world" and further added that he remained "optimistic about United States-Indonesia relations under a Donald Trump presidency."

==== Iran ====
President Hassan Rouhani said the result would not change his country's policies. He added, in reference to Trump's administration possibly distancing the U.S. from the rest of the world, that: "The position of the United States has been weakened within the international community and in the world's public opinion as a result of wrongful policies, and a wider gap with the global community and Europe will further harm that position." He also said that the U.S. could not spread Iranophobia as forcefully anymore in order to get international consensus against Iran. "The Islamic Republic's policy of constructive interaction with the world and breaking up nuclear sanctions, has placed Iran's economic ties with all countries on an improving and irreversible course." He noted that the JCPOA was an agreement with one country or government but was approved by the UN Security Council Resolution and thus could not be overturned unilaterally.

- Foreign Minister Mohammad Javad Zarif said, while visiting Romania, that Iran expects a new government to respect the JCPOA. "It is our norm not to interfere in the domestic affairs of other countries. Since Iran and the U.S. have no political relations, what is important is that America's next president is bound by the multilateral commitments of the JCPOA. We are certain the international community would expect the same thing from the United States of America." Foreign Ministry Spokesman Bahram Qassemi also said that U.S. policies in the past decades brought about "an unpleasant, bitter experience" for Iran. "What is important to Iran and its people, and would be used by them as evaluation criteria, is the next U.S. administration's future performance and executive policies." He added that the policies of previous administrations, including intervention in the Middle East, are the "main factor behind the escalation of tensions." As such, he called for a review of its policies vis-à-vis other regions.

==== Iraq ====
Cleric Moqtada al-Sadr issued a statement that censured Trump over his "escalating statements against Islam and Muslims" and calling on him to refrain from engaging in "new gambles with blood and war." It added: "Even if the US president changed, the hostile policies against the world will not change." He further called on Trump "not to throw himself into new gambles in the world of politics as the results would be nothing other than losses, blood and warfare -- something which would only prolong America's woes especially at the time it is going through a financial distress." He asked the people of the US "not to be affected by the radicalism of their president, [otherwise they would] suffer from the international isolation because of the reckless policies which is unacceptable to every mind and every religion." He concluded the statement by signing off "Peace be on the American people. You have to know that Israel will remain our first enemy."

- The Popular Mobilization Forces of Iraq congratulated Trump on Twitter and stated that "together we will defeat ISIS".
- Kurdistan Regional Government's (KRG) Head of Foreign Relations Falah Mustafa Bakir said: "I want to congratulate Mr. Donald Trump on becoming the next president of the United States, after a hard-fought campaign. We expect the Trump administration to continue military cooperation in the fight against terrorism and continue humanitarian efforts for those displaced."

==== Israel ====
President Reuven Rivlin congratulated Trump. He added: "I hope together Israelis and Americans can grow our innovation and cooperation, which are the fruits of liberty, and equality."

- Prime Minister Benjamin Netanyahu congratulated Trump. His statement added that "President-elect Trump is a true friend of the State of Israel. We will work together to advance the security, stability, and peace in our region. ... I'm certain that President-elect Trump and I will continue to strengthen the unique alliance between Israel and the United States, and bring it to new heights."
- Education Minister Naftali Bennett said: "Trump's victory is an opportunity for Israel to immediately retract the notion of a Palestinian state. This is the position of the president-elect. The era of a Palestinian state is over."

==== Japan ====
Prime Minister Shinzō Abe offered "heartfelt congratulations" to Trump and said the two countries are "unshakeable allies connected by common values such as freedom, democracy, basic human rights and rule of law. The stability of the Asia-Pacific region, which is the driving force of the global economy, brings peace and prosperity to the United States."

- Katsuyuki Kawai, a political aide to Abe in charge of diplomacy, said that after meeting with Abe he had been instructed by an unnamed official to visit Washington the following week. Chief Cabinet Secretary Yoshihide Suga added that it was not because Japan was unprepared for Trump's win: "We have been preparing so that we can respond to any situation because our stance is that our alliance with the U.S. remains to be the cornerstone of our diplomacy whoever becomes the next president."

==== Kazakhstan ====
Kazakhstani president Nursultan Nazarbayev congratulated Trump wishing him success, invited him to visit Kazakhstan, and added: "I believe that under your leadership the United States will remain a mainstay in maintaining stability, security and prosperity throughout the world."

==== Kuwait ====
Kuwaiti emir Sheikh al-Sabah sent his congratulations to Trump and "expressed hopes that Kuwait and the U.S. will continue their strong historic relations, working together for a brighter future for the world."

==== Lebanon ====
Newly elected president Michel Aoun congratulated Trump and expressed hope for strengthening cooperation between Lebanon and the United States. Aoun said, "It is with great pleasure I congratulate you on your election as President of the United States of America, the great country which is tied to Lebanon through friendship and mutual respect."

- Prime Minister Saad Hariri sent a congratulatory letter to Trump in which he assured him that Lebanon would remain committed to working with the new administration to reach a common understanding on regional issues. "Your leadership is necessary to ensure stability, security and peace in the Middle East."
- Change and Reform bloc MP Alain Aoun praised the Trump victory on Twitter writing "within two weeks, two non-traditional presidential candidates, opposed by the classical political class, were brought [to power] by popular will." (In reference to both Trump and Michel Aoun's October 31 victories)
- Loyalty to the Resistance bloc MP Nawwaf Musawi said he was optimistic about Trump's isolationist foreign policy. He said after a weekly meeting with Speaker Nabih Berri: "The more the U.S. policy turn towards isolationism, the more relieved the world would be from its evil."

==== Malaysia ====
Prime Minister Najib Razak congratulated U.S. president-elect Donald Trump, saying the Republican victor had appealed to Americans who wanted to see the United States less embroiled in intervention abroad. Najib said he looked forward to continuing a partnership with the United States under Trump's presidency.

==== Maldives ====
President Abdulla Yameen congratulated Trump on his victory. In his message, he said "I remain confident that the existing ties of friendship and cooperation between our two countries will continue and further strengthen under your able leadership. I also look forward to working with you not only to develop closer relations between our countries but also to concert on advancement of global interests common to our countries". The president also said that he support Trump's policy of "no-interference" on other countries affairs. He added "Today, America elected its new President. The strongest policy he has announced so far is to stop America's efforts to meddle in global affairs. America needs to stop policing the entire world. This, without a doubt, is a very good principle".

==== Myanmar ====
President's office deputy-director and spokesman for Myanmar president Htin Kyaw, Zaw Htay said: "I believe that the relationship between the U.S.A. and Burma (Myanmar) can only get better under President Trump." Following Trump's win, Zaw congratulated him on Facebook by writing: "Best wishes for you to make America Great Again!"

==== North Korea ====
Kim Yong Ho, director of human rights and humanitarian issues, stated on behalf of the country, "We do not care about whoever becomes the president of the United States, the fundamental issue here is whether or not the United States has the political will to withdraw its hostile policy toward the DPRK".

==== Pakistan ====
Prime Minister Nawaz Sharif congratulated Trump on his "historic victory." Sharif stated: "On behalf of the government and people of Pakistan, and on my own behalf, I wish to extend to you and the people of the United States, our most sincere felicitations on your election as the 45th president of the United States. Most importantly, your momentous success is a testimony to the confidence that the people of the United States have reposed in your leadership, vision and commitment to serve your great country." He added Pakistan and the United States have enjoyed a strategic partnership, rooted in the shared ideals of freedom, democracy, mutual respect, and commonality of interests. "I wish to re-affirm my government's commitment to further strengthening and deepening of our relations, in a manner truly reflective of the aspirations of our two nations. I am looking forward to closely working with you, to bring our two countries closer and making our partnership an important vehicle for the realization of peace, security and prosperity in the region and beyond."

==== Palestine ====
President Mahmoud Abbas hoped the Middle East peace process "will be achieved" during Trump's presidency and also congratulated him.

- Saeb Erekat, Abbas' aide, said he did not expect a change in US policies over the Israeli–Palestinian conflict under Trump. He added that both the Republican and Democratic parties were committed to a two-state solution and that he thought "this will not change with the coming administration."

==== Philippines ====
President Rodrigo Duterte offered "warm congratulations" to Trump and looks forward to working with him to enhance relations, according to a statement by Presidential Communications Secretary Martin Andanar. Duterte also told a gathering of Filipinos in Kuala Lumpur during his Malaysian visit said that he "[does not] want to fight because Trump is there." (Duterte previously had a war of words with incumbent U.S. President Barack Obama due to the latter's criticism of Duterte's war on drugs.) He then congratulated Trump and greeted him: "Mabuhay ka! [May you live!]".

==== Saudi Arabia ====
King Salman bin Abdulaziz Al Saud congratulated Trump and affirmed Saudi Arabia's aspiration to promote the historical and strategic relations with the United States and work together to bring peace and stability to the Middle East and the world, as well-wishing the American people further progress and prosperity under his leadership.

- Prince Al-Waleed bin Talal congratulated Trump on Twitter; although previously he was involved in an argument with Trump on Twitter, writing "President-elect @realDonaldTrump whatever the past differences, America has spoken, congratulations & best wishes for your presidency."

==== Singapore ====
Prime Minister Lee Hsien Loong congratulated Trump saying "voters have elected a president whom they feel best represents them and Singapore fully respects their decision." He added that Singapore will continue to work together with the United States to cultivate strong ties.

==== South Korea ====
President Park Geun-hye congratulated Trump saying she "hopes for further closer cooperation between the two nations on North Korea's nuclear issue to maintain the peace and stability on the Korean Peninsula, in Northeast Asia and beyond on the back of the deepening and developing alliance" according to Presidential Spokesman Jung Youn-kuk.

==== Sri Lanka ====
President Maithripala Sirisena wrote on Twitter congratulating Trump: "My warm congratulations to US president-elect Donald J. Trump on this historic victory."

- Prime Minister Ranil Wickremesinghe said "Mr. Trump's path to White House has indeed been truly remarkable. We look forward to working closely with you and your team."

==== Syria ====
President Bashar al-Assad said that he was "ready" to cooperate with the incoming Trump administration.

- Speaking to National Public Radio two days after the election, Bouthaina Shaaban said any collaboration over the Syrian Civil War will depend on "whether Mr Trump's policies meet expectations. I think the American people have sent a great, a very important message to the world."
- Sinam Mohammad, the European Representative of the Rojava autonomous democratic administration, the de facto government running Kurdish-held northern Syria, said that the Syrian Kurds hope to get more support from a Trump administration. "We congratulate the American people with the new president. We hope President Trump can play a positive role to end the war and bloodshed in Syria."

==== Taiwan ====
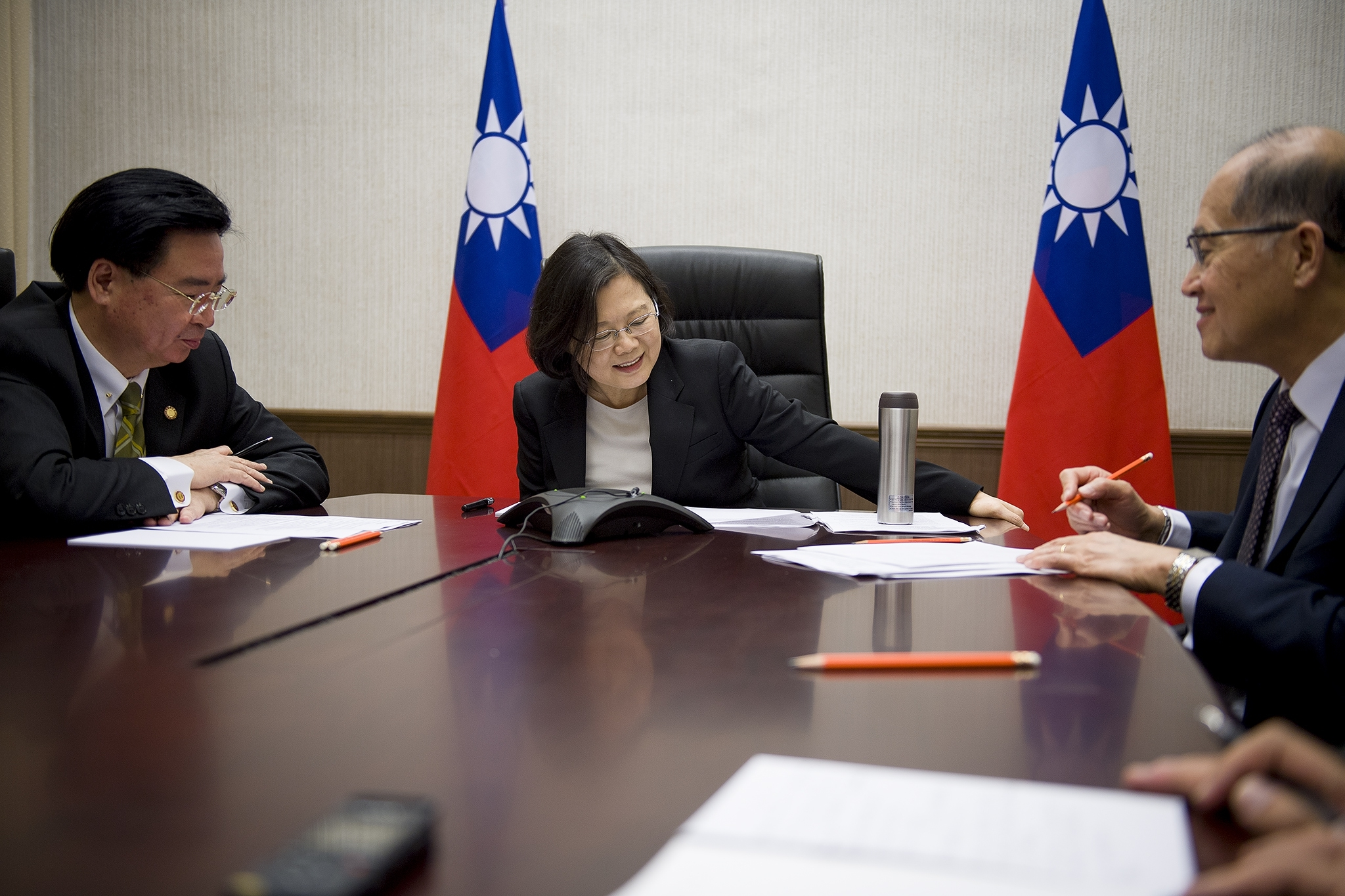
Tsai Ing-wen, President of Taiwan (centre), makes a phone call to US President-elect Donald Trump on 2 December. Also pictured were Joseph Wu, Secretary-General of National Security Council (left), and David Lee, Minister of Foreign affairs (right).

President Tsai Ing-wen sent a letter of congratulations to Trump and stated that under his leadership relations between Taiwan and the United States are certain to grow even stronger in the years to come. On December 2, 2016, U.S. President-Elect Donald Trump accepted a congratulatory phone call from Taiwanese President Tsai Ing-Wen, which was the first time since 1979 that a US President-Elect has publicly spoken to the President of Taiwan.

==== Thailand ====
Prime Minister Prayut Chan-o-cha extended his congratulations to Trump saying:

We have to adjust to change. Things keep changing. I have not been indifferent to change. Instead, I have been keeping abreast of it.

==== Turkey ====
President Recep Tayyip Erdoğan said: "I hope that this choice of the American people will lead to beneficial steps being taken for the world concerning basic rights and freedoms, democracy and developments in our region."

- Justice Minister Bekir Bozdağ said a change will not make a big difference to the "deep-rooted" relations between the two countries.

... in essence our relations are relations between two states and we hope that under the new presidential term the Turkish-U.S. relations will be much better. That is our expectation. I saw an intense campaign for Hillary Clinton's victory. Artists, sportsmen, all personalities worked for Clinton's victory. But in elections, it is important to embrace the people. No one has won elections through newspaper headlines, opinion polls or television (campaigns).

==== United Arab Emirates ====
President Sheikh Khalifa congratulated Trump and wished him "success in his future tasks." He also commended the strategic ties between the two countries and emphasised the U.A.E.'s desire to strengthen those relations.

Vice President and Emir of Dubai Sheikh Mohammed bin Rashid Al Maktoum also offered his congratulations to Trump.

==== Other ====
Bruneian sultan Hassanal Bolkiah, Kyrgyzstani president Almazbek Atambayev, Vietnamese president Trần Đại Quang and Vietnamese prime minister Nguyễn Xuân Phúc sent congratulatory messages to Trump. Qatari minister of foreign affairs Mohammed bin Abdulrahman Al Thani congratulated Trump via Twitter. Tajikistani president Emomali Rahmon congratulated Trump and hoped for further expansion of cooperation and partnership with the United States under his term.

=== Europe ===
==== Austria ====
Norbert Hofer, the third president of the National Council and the Austrian Freedom Party's candidate for president in 2016, supported Trump, remarking "Wherever the elites distance themselves from voters, those elites will be voted out of office."

==== Belarus ====
Belarusian president Alexander Lukashenko sent his greetings to Trump saying: "Your active, sincere, and courageous position during the election campaign inspired the American society, returned it to true democracy."

==== Cyprus ====
President Nicos Anastasiades wrote on Twitter: "Congratulations to [Donald Trump] on winning the U.S. presidential election. My wishes for a most successful and productive term in Office." In a statement added to the message, he added:

Under your leadership, the Republic of Cyprus looks forward to deepening its strategic partnership with the US. The Cyprus-led and Cyprus-owned negotiations to reunify Cyprus are taking place in an even more intensified format. As a Permanent Member of the UN Security Council, the US plays a pivotal role is [sic] assisting our efforts towards ending Turkey's military occupation and reunifying Cyprus for the benefit of all Cypriots.

==== Czech Republic ====
President Miloš Zeman congratulated Trump and noted that he "shares his views" and "appreciates Trump's public demeanor". Zeman also invited Trump for state visit to the capital, Prague. His Spokesman Jiří Ovčáček had earlier said that "average Americans managed to beat pseudo-elites and the lying media." Zeman had previously endorsed Trump.

- Prime Minister Bohuslav Sobotka wrote on Twitter that Trump had won on "aggressive populism" but at least "he knows, unlike some of his predecessors, where the Czech Republic is." Sobotka also congratulated Trump and added he believes the United States will remain a reliable and stable ally.

==== Denmark ====
Danish prime minister Lars Løkke Rasmussen released a statement that read Trump was elected after an unusually fierce and confrontational campaign. He also congratulated Trump and expressed a hope for continued good relations between Europe and the U.S..

==== Finland ====
Finnish president Sauli Niinistö congratulated Trump and wished him luck and "wisdom in his significant duties." He also highlighted the international tension and the role of the president of the United States in shaping the world.

==== France ====
President François Hollande says the election "opens a period of uncertainty. It must be faced with lucidity and clarity." He also congratulated Trump "as is natural between two heads of state [but] certain positions taken by Donald Trump during the American campaign must be confronted with the values and interests we share with the United States. What is at stake is peace, the fight against terrorism, the situation in the Middle East. It is economic relations and the preservation of the planet." He had previously endorsed Clinton.

- Foreign Minister Jean-Marc Ayrault said France would continue to work with whoever wins. However, he was concerned about Trump's lead and said it could hold a cautionary message for Europe. "We don't want a world where egoism triumphs. [But] there is a part of our electorate that feels ... abandoned, [including people who feel] "left behind" by globalization." He added that a Trump victory could bring "more incertitude" to French politics.
- Minister of Ecology Ségolène Royal referred to Trump's denial of climate change as "absolutely catastrophic" and expressed her belief that China would take the country's place in international affairs if the United States withdraws from its international agreements on climate change under his presidency.
- National Front leader Marine Le Pen congratulated Trump even before the final result. She wrote on Twitter of her support for the "American people, free!".

==== Germany ====
President Joachim Gauck congratulated Trump on his victory, although a few days before he expressed concerns over him being elected.

- Chancellor Angela Merkel said that "Germany and America are tied by values of democracy, freedom and respect for the law and human dignity, independent of origin, skin colour, religion, gender, sexual orientation or political views. I offer the next president of the United States, Donald Trump, close cooperation on the basis of these values." The comment was interpreted as reintegrative shaming.
- Vice Chancellor Sigmar Gabriel said: "Trump is the pioneer of a new authoritarian and chauvinist international movement. He is also a warning for us".
- Foreign Minister and presidential nominee of the governing coalition Frank-Walter Steinmeier refused to congratulate Trump, and criticized Trump's views. He also refused to retract his previous description of Trump as a "hate preacher." However he said that Germany respected the outcome despite it not being favored by most Germans.
- Defense Minister Ursula von der Leyen said the result was "a big shock" and "a vote against Washington, against the establishment. We Europeans obviously know that as partners in the NATO, Donald Trump will naturally ask what 'are you achieving for the alliance,' but we will also ask 'what's your stand toward the alliance.'" She added the government would work to establish working level contacts to find out the new contact persons.
- Christian Democratic Union head of the Bundestag's Foreign Affair Committee Norbert Röttgen said: "We're realizing now that we have no idea what this American president will do if the voice of anger enters office and the voice of anger becomes the most powerful man in the world."
- Frauke Petry, the leader of the Alternative for Germany stated in response to Trump's victory "The election of Donald Trump is a triumph of the American people, a victory of ordinary people over the political establishment. It's a victory over the politically correct globalist elites who show little interest in the well-being of the people."

==== Greece ====
President Prokopis Pavlopoulos sent a congratulatory message stating:

On the occasion of your election as the 45th President of the United States of America I wish you every success in your important mission at a time of global changes and challenges. Greece and the United States are linked by a long and durable friendship based on shared values of freedom, human rights and democracy. Today our two countries are important allies, linked both within NATO and the Euro-Atlantic Community, and the millions of Greek Americans. I am confident that during your presidency, those links will continue to be strengthened and enhanced, to the mutual benefit of our nations, and for the benefit of world peace, stability and progress. Please accept, on behalf of the Greek people and myself, sincere wishes for your personal health and for the welfare of the American people.

==== Holy See ====
Pope Francis on Twitter called for "dialogue, mutual acceptance and fraternal cooperation" after the election. Vatican secretary of state Cardinal Pietro Parolin expressed respect for the will of the people, noting the strong election turnout. He wished that Trump, whose wife would be the second Roman Catholic first lady, could serve towards the well-being of his people and the furtherance of world peace.

==== Hungary ====
Prime Minister Viktor Orbán sent a congratulatory message in a Facebook post. "What great news. Democracy is still alive." Speaking at a business conference on 10 November, Orbán said: "Western civilization has successfully liberated itself from the captivity of an ideology" with the election of Trump "and return to reality." He also called the past 25 years in the world as "liberal non-democracy" which ended after Brexit and Trump's victory.

- Foreign Minister Péter Szijjártó hailed Trump's victory saying "courageous approaches, new and innovative policies will be needed" during these times, when "a new era has begun in both the world economy and world politics, which poses historic challenges for the whole world."
- Jobbik leader Gábor Vona said: "We, the Hungarians respect other people's rights to form their own destinies and we expect this from everyone too. Therefore we congratulate the new president!"
- Former prime minister and Democratic Coalition (DK) leader Ferenc Gyurcsány congratulated Trump in a Facebook post. In response to the Hungarian left-wing's reactions he added "there is no reason to panic. ... Orbán must be defeated at home. We cannot expect assistance from Washington. What we can learn from the United States election is that there is possible to overcome the lack of media coverage and funding. Moreover, pollsters are not infallible.

==== Iceland ====
President Guðni Th. Jóhannesson sent his congratulations to Trump. In his statement, Guðni had caveats that Icelanders value the concepts of equality and tolerance. "The President emphasised in his statement the cooperation and friendship between the two countries, and the long common history that stretches all the way back to when seafarers from Iceland and Greenland landed in North America more than a thousand years ago. Even though the United States is one of the largest democracies in the world, and Iceland one of the smallest, these nations share many important values. We unconditionally support the right to freedom of thought and expression, gender equality, and highly value equal rights for all regardless of race or religion."

==== Ireland ====
President Michael D. Higgins spoke of the "deep connection" between Ireland and the United States, conveying "best wishes to President Elect Donald Trump, wishing him and the American people every good fortune for his term in office." Taoiseach Enda Kenny, who had previously condemned Trump's rhetoric as "racist and divisive", was among the first world leaders to speak with Trump on the phone and offer congratulations, and confirmed that the annual St. Patrick's Day ceremony at the White House, which has occurred since 1952, would continue under the new administration.

- In an address to Seanad Éireann on 10 November, Labour Party senator Aodhán Ó Ríordáin labelled Trump as a "fascist" and a "monster", quoting Edmund Burke's attributed maxim that "the only way evil can prosper is for good men to do nothing". He condemned Trump's statements threatening to imprison Hillary Clinton, barring Muslims from entering the country, mass deportations, and his assertions that the media and the political system were rigged. Describing current events as an "ugly political crossroads", Ó Ríordáin declared that he was "embarrassed" and "frightened" by the reaction of the Taoiseach and the government and their focus on maintaining American investments in Ireland, and applauded SDLP leader Colum Eastwood's statement that his party would boycott the St. Patrick's Day ceremony at the White House during Trump's presidency. His statements went viral on social media.

==== Italy ====
Prime Minister Matteo Renzi vowed to maintain strong and friendly ties between Italy and the United States and said that the international community should consider Trump's election as a new starting point.

- Beppe Grillo, the leader of the Five Star Movement, stated "The mainstream media has often spoken of [Donald Trump] in the same way they speak of our movement. Do you remember? They said that we were sexist, homophobic, demagogues, populists. They do not realize that millions of people no longer read their newspapers or watch their TVs. Trump capitalized on all this."

==== Lithuania ====
Reflecting Lithuania's history of being annexed by the Soviet Union in 1940 and his fears that "Russian president Vladimir Putin may test NATO in the weeks before Donald Trump becomes US President", and that Putin and Trump are "too close for comfort", Lithuanian foreign minister Linas Linkevicius has said that he is very afraid for the Baltic Republics (NATO members Lithuania, Latvia, and Estonia), as well as for the Syrian city of Aleppo (a reference to Russia's involvement in the ongoing Battle of Aleppo in the Syrian Civil War).

==== Malta ====
Maltese prime minister Joseph Muscat, while in New York City for a seminar, wrote: "I congratulate US president-elect Donald Trump. Now it is time for Europe and US to get closer to each other and not the other way around."

==== Netherlands ====
Generally Dutch politicians reacted disappointed or even shocked by Trump's victory. Prime Minister Mark Rutte phoned President-elect Trump on the evening of his election, congratulating him. Rutte and Trump both stressed the importance of continued close cooperation between the US and the Netherlands, being loyal allies and good friends. "The historical, cultural and economic ties between our countries are strong and we reaffirmed that in our conversation", said Rutte. He continued stating that the strong Dutch-American relationship provides many jobs on both sides of the Atlantic and that cooperation is necessary to address common problems. Rutte looks forward to continue working together with Trump towards a safe and prosperous world and a strong EU-US relationship".

- Minister of Foreign Affairs Bert Koenders has reacted lukewarm and said he will await Trump's policy agenda and will judge Trump for his actions. Koenders showed some concern about Trump's campaign statements on Russia and NATO.
- Green Party leader Jesse Klaver was most explicit in his disappointment, saying: "Oh. My. God. Trump represents a form of politics that sets people against each other instead of bringing them together; that ignores climate change instead of tackling it. He conducted a campaign full of lies, sexism and vulgar language. I worry about what that will mean for the United States and the world."
- Populist politicians Geert Wilders and Jan Roos were the only ones reacting positively. Wilders wrote on Twitter "A historic victory! A revolution." He added that: "We also will give our country back to the people of the Netherlands." The day after the election, Wilders stated that "America regained its national sovereignty, its identity. It reclaimed its own democracy, that's why I called it a revolution. And I think that the people of America, as in Europe, feel insulted by all the politicians that ignore the real problems."

==== Norway ====
Prime Minister Erna Solberg said at a press conference:

I would like to congratulate Donald Trump on his election victory. The US is our closest ally and our cooperation is based on shared values and interests. We will seek to cooperate constructively with Donald Trump and with his administration once it is in place.

==== Portugal ====
President Marcelo Rebelo de Sousa sent Trump a message of congratulations and wished him success. He also made reference to the "bonds of friendship that unite Portugal and the U.S.A. and the significant community of Portuguese and Luso-Americans in the United States."

- Prime Minister António Costa made a brief statement when asked about the election result: "We have the habit of respecting the democratic decisions of friendly Peoples, with whom we have established relations ... We wish to maintain the excellent relationship with have had, throughout History, with the United States; our relations with the USA are centuries-old ... Portugal has had several governments, the USA have had several governments; we have relations between States, between Peoples."
- The Ministry of Foreign Affairs, on the behalf of the XXI Constitutional Government, congratulated Trump and noted: "We trust that the foreign policy priorities of the new Administration will conform to the values that have guided the actions of the United States around the world, to the commitment to the United Nations' multilateral system, to the North Atlantic Alliance, and to its relations with the European Union. Portugal shall loyally cooperate with the United States, bilaterally and multilaterally, and respect international law and the democratic values that strengthen the ties that so deeply connect the two countries."
- The Left Bloc's Political Commission released a statement to the press: "Donald Trump's victory is terrible news to the United States and the world. It's a victory of hate politics — hate towards equal rights, towards immigration, and towards the primacy of human rights ... it's the most impressive case of the post-financial-crisis cycle of the desintegration [sic?] of political systems." The Portuguese Communist Party noted that "the election ... has reflected the deep problems, contradictions and inequalities that affect the country's society, the expression of the depth of capitalism's structural crisis affecting the world's greatest imperialist power."
- The leader of the People's Party Assunção Cristas said that "today is the day to respect the free and democratic decision of the American people, and accept the results" and underscored the need of careful consideration on the subject of opinion polls.

==== Russia ====
President Vladimir Putin congratulated Trump and said: "The current US–Russian relations cannot be called friendly. Hopefully, with the new U.S. president a more constructive dialogue will be possible between our countries."

- Duma Foreign Affairs Committee member Vyacheslav Novikov said "three minutes ago, Hillary Clinton acknowledged her defeat in the U.S. presidential elections and just a second ago, Trump began his speech as president-elect. I congratulate all of you on this." The Duma then broke into applause.
- Liberal Democratic Party leader Vladimir Zhirinovsky said: "We of course regard with satisfaction that the better candidate of the two presented to the American voters was victorious." He added that he hoped the Ambassador to Russia John Tefft would leave. "We hope that this ambassador leaves Russia ... he hates Russia."

==== Serbia ====
President Tomislav Nikolić congratulated Trump and said: "We must make additional efforts to establish even more friendly relations with the United States."

- Prime Minister Aleksandar Vučić congratulated Trump on his "great victory." He said:

I take this opportunity to express my sincere congratulations on your election success and the great victory in the presidential election. I believe you will approach your duties as the 45th president of the United States with the dedication and determination that characterized also your remarkable campaign. The leadership that you have shown on this occasion, represents a strong will that is necessary not only to citizens of the United States, but also to the whole world. I sincerely hope that your victory will contribute to continuing improvement of bilateral relations between Serbia and the United States, which are already on the path of progress and development, to the mutual benefit of our two countries.

==== Spain ====
Spanish prime minister Mariano Rajoy wrote on Twitter congratulating Trump and tweeted that "we'll continue to work to strengthen relations that we have with [the] US, an indispensable partner."

- Catalan president Carles Puigdemont admitted being worried about Trump's election. According to Puigdemont, this unease is shared by all the Catalan sovereigntist parties, since they reject populism. Puigdemont forecast that Trump's victory will bring "new uncertainties" but emphasised that the American citizens' decision, which has been made "with freedom," must be respected.
- Leader of the Podemos party, Pablo Iglesias, and some other members of the party expressed their rejection of the incoming President, calling him "fascist", "racist", and "machist".
- Different members of PSOE lamented the victory of Donald Trump, believing that he represented a threat to the coexistence and human rights.

==== Switzerland ====
Government spokesperson André Simonazzi said: "The Swiss government has taken note of the election results in the United States. As is customary, the Swiss president sent congratulations through diplomatic channels this morning." He added that the Swiss authorities have been in touch with the teams of both candidates for the presidency in the run-up to prepare the next steps. "Switzerland will continue to defend its interests and prepare for contact with the new administration."

- Former federal councillor and prominent Swiss People's Party member Christoph Blocher stated that Trump's victory was a warning to world leaders not to ignore the people's concerns on issues such as immigration, saying "people feel powerless against those who rule them, and for them, Trump is a release valve."

==== Ukraine ====
- Prime Minister Volodymyr Groysman also congratulated Trump and American people on Facebook. He wished the United States peace and prosperity under the new administration and hoped that it would continue its support for Ukraine.
- Prime minister of the self-proclaimed Donetsk People's Republic Aleksandr Zakharchenko said: "The Minsk meeting on Wednesday was a failure. Trump's victory upset all Ukrainian policymakers' plans. They received no further orders, so they decided to freeze the talks. I don't expect any progress in Minsk before Trump's inauguration."

==== United Kingdom ====
Prime Minister Theresa May congratulated Trump. In relation to Brexit, she invoked the so-called "Special Relationship" stating that the two countries would remain "strong and close partners on trade, security and defence."

- Foreign Secretary Boris Johnson, a key figure in the Brexit campaign earlier in 2016, congratulated Trump and looked forward to opportunities to co-operate between the two countries. He had previously ridiculed Trump for his statements on Islam in Europe. He also snubbed an E.U. "special session" of foreign ministers a day before a regular meeting over Trump's election saying: "We do not see the need for an additional meeting on Sunday because the US election timetable is long established. An act of democracy has taken place, there is a transition period and we will work with the current and future administrations to ensure the best outcomes for Britain."
- Leader of the Opposition Jeremy Corbyn gave a mixed reaction, opining that Trump's victory was the American people's reaction to failed economic policies and a distant "governing elite." However, he added that some of Trump's views used "divisive rhetoric" that was "clearly wrong."
- The UK Independence Party's Nigel Farage congratulated Trump by praising his campaign and his "post-Brexit values." Farage supported Trump's candidacy throughout the general election and even spoke at a rally of his on one occasion. He met Trump in New York City on November 12 and wrote on Twitter that Trump "was relaxed and full of good ideas. I'm confident he will be a good President." He also said of Trump's support for relations between the two countries "very strong" and that he was the man the U.K. "can do business" with. Trump's campaign manager, Kellyanne Conway confirmed the meeting and said: "I think they enjoy each other's company, and they actually had a chance to talk about freedom and winning and what this all means for the world."
- Mayor of London Sadiq Khan said: "I hope Donald Trump will now do everything in his power to unite people and bring divided communities back together. I wish him well."
- Far-right groups Britain First, the English Defence League and the British National Party reacted positively to Trump's election win, while anti-xenophobia group Hope not Hate expressed major concerns.
- First Minister of Northern Ireland Arlene Foster said she looked forward to working with his administration and said Northern Ireland has "strong historical, economic and political ties to the United States. As our largest inward investor, the U.S. plays a massive role in our economic progress."
- First Minister of Scotland Nicola Sturgeon, who had removed Trump from a list of business ambassadors to the country because of his stance on Islam, said that it was not the result she wanted but that the decision should be respected.
- First Minister of Wales Carwyn Jones did not offer congratulations in his reaction but said, in a statement, "following the most brutal and bruising election campaign in modern American history, Donald Trump will have much work to do to repair a divided nation."

===== British Overseas Territories =====
- Bermudan Premier Michael Dunkley wrote to Trump to extend his well wishes.
- Premier of The Cayman Islands Alden McLaughlin's office released a 56-word statement which said that: "The Cayman Islands congratulates Donald Trump and the Republican Party on an emphatic victory in yesterday's presidential election. We will watch with interest as Mr Trump organises his Cabinet and sets his policies as well as his agenda for the next four years and look forward to a positive working relationship with the new US administration.

===== British Crown dependencies =====
Chief Minister of Isle of Man Howard Quayle said although Trump made clear his use of offshore jurisdictions, there is no scope for complacency in the drive to establish tax transparency. He said he firmly believes first-rate regulatory compliance and adherence to information-exchange agreements will set the Island above vilification. Through campaign, Trump had made no apology for refusing to disclose his federal tax payments, instead saying "that makes me smart." However, he had previously said tax avoidance was a substantial global problem and made worse by legal offshore structures.

==== Other ====
The President of Albania Bujar Nishani, Croatian prime minister Andrej Plenković, and Polish president Andrzej Duda congratulated Trump on his victory.

The President of Slovenia Borut Pahor congratulated Trump and his Slovenian-born wife Melania Trump on Twitter.

=== North America ===
==== Canada ====
Prime Minister Justin Trudeau's office declined to comment until a winner was declared. At a US embassy party on election night, Finance Minister Bill Morneau and Environment Minister Catherine McKenna arrived and left without making any comments. Trudeau later wrote on Facebook:

I congratulate President-elect Donald Trump on his election victory in the United States. Our shared values are strong. Our common purpose is to build countries where everyone has a fair chance to succeed, and where the government works first, foremost and always for the people it governs. The Canadian government will continue its hard work toward these ends, and we offer our hand in partnership with our neighbours as friends and allies as they move forward.

- An unnamed Canadian official said that should Trump win, Canadians can take some measure of comfort in that Trump has previously appeared to show a lot of respect for Trudeau and his international status. "They think he's a showman ... They respect his success. You've noticed how careful our prime minister has been. I think that was smart ... You don't ever know."
- Former diplomat Colin Robertson said Clinton winning would be beneficial for Canada's because of the continuity it would offer with Obama's tenure. "We've already got a reset relationship starting in March, confirmed at the end of June when the president came up here."
- Conservative Party of Canada Leadership candidate Kellie Leitch issued a statement that read Trump had an "exciting message that needs to be delivered in Canada as well."

==== Cuba ====
President Raúl Castro sent his greetings to Trump upon his election.

- Esteban Morales, a member of the Communist Party of Cuba, said that the country's leaders "must be worried because I think this represents a new chapter."
- Former diplomat of Cuba Carlos Alzugaray Treto said that a Trump victory could, however, please some hard-liners in the Cuban leadership who were worried about that Cuba was moving too close to the United States too quickly.

==== Dominican Republic ====
Minister of the Dominican Republic José Ramón Peralta said the country would continue to strengthen trade and diplomatic ties with the US.

==== Mexico ====
Mexican president Enrique Peña Nieto congratulated Trump via Twitter writing: "Mexico and the U.S. are friends, partners and allies who should continue working for the competitiveness and the development of North America."

==== Nicaragua ====
Nicaraguan president Daniel Ortega sent a message to Trump saluting his electoral triumph on behalf of the Nicaraguan people and the government saying:

We join those who believe that it is possible to work with the United States to contribute to a world that privileges dialogue and understanding to attend the serious problems that affect humanity prioritizing peace. From our dignified and free Nicaragua which works in Christianity, Socialism and Solidarity, I greet you, your family and your people.

=== Oceania ===
==== Australia ====
Prime Minister Malcolm Turnbull congratulated Trump, as well as thanked outgoing president Barack Obama for his leadership over the past eight years. He also said that the US was "a great and powerful nation and they are a great and powerful friend."

- Foreign Minister Julie Bishop said that her government is ready to work with whomever the American people "in their wisdom" choose. She added that a US presidential election is always a momentous occasion and in this instance, "it has been a particularly bruising, divisive and hard-fought campaign." She further said the new administration will face a number of challenges, including in the Asia-Pacific, and Australia wants to work constructively with the new administration to ensure the continued presence and leadership of the United States in the region. She said the US is "our major security ally" and the largest foreign direct investor and the second-largest trading partner. "The United States is also the guarantor and defender of the rules-based international order that has underpinned so much of our economic and security issues. And interests."
- Treasurer of New South Wales Dominic Perrottet, who later became Premier in 2021, congratulated Trump's victory in a Facebook post, saying it was "a victory for people who have been taken for granted by the elites of political establishment" and that it was "time for a conservative spring".

==== Fiji ====
Prime Minister Frank Bainimarama congratulated Trump, while also taking the opportunity to emphasise that action on climate change is a priority for Fiji:

Fiji has a close relationship with the United States and I look forward to working with you and your administration in the months and years ahead. We especially seek America's support in our struggle against the extreme weather events and rising sea levels caused by climate change, which pose a particular threat to the Pacific islands and other low lying areas of the world. We also look forward to working with you to protect our oceans and seas from the threat of pollution and overfishing. With every best wish as you prepare to assume the presidency.

==== New Zealand ====
Economic Development Minister Steven Joyce, on behalf of Prime Minister John Key, moved in the House of Representatives "that the House convey its congratulations to President-elect Donald Trump on his election as the next president of the United States, and to Vice President–elect Mike Pence on his election, and in doing so express our desire to work with the incoming Trump Administration to continue building on New Zealand's already strong relationship with the United States." The motion was agreed to 106 votes to 14, with the Green Party opposing.

==== Papua New Guinea ====
Prime Minister Peter O'Neill extended his congratulations to Trump on behalf of the people of Papua New Guinea. In a statement that read "the result of the election is a decision of the American people and Papua New Guinea will work with the elected government of the day, as we do in every partner nation." He also congratulated Clinton for her hard-fought campaign and thanked her for her relationship with Papua New Guinea as well for her inspiration to women and girls around the world.

=== South America ===
==== Argentina ====
Argentine chancellor Susana Malcorra congratulated Trump for his victory, but also regretted that the US did not elect a female president for the first time. Argentine President Mauricio Macri also congratulated him shortly afterwards.

==== Brazil ====
Brazilian president Michel Temer issued a statement that read Trump's election will not change the relationship between the two countries that is "institutional" and "from State to State."

==== Colombia ====
President Juan Manuel Santos wrote on Twitter that: "We celebrate the democratic spirit of the United States. With Donald Trump we will continue to strengthen our bilateral relations."

- The Colombian Ministry of Foreign Affairs issued a press releases stating: "The Government of Colombia congratulates the Republican candidate Donald Trump for his victory in the elections and wishes him success in the role as the new president of the United States of America." It also read: "[T]he strategic relations between Colombia and the United States have had a bipartisan backing, and has characterised itself for successful cooperation, a profound political dialogue, and a diversified agenda that positively impacts both countries."

==== Venezuela ====
Venezuelan president Nicolás Maduro in a telephone call with Secretary of State John Kerry sent a congratulatory message to both Trump and Clinton while they discussed bilateral relations between both countries.

==== Other ====
Chilean president Michelle Bachelet and Peruvian president Pedro Pablo Kuczynski sent their good wishes to Trump.

== International organizations ==
=== Assyrian Universal Alliance ===
In an open letter, the group Assyrian Universal Alliance congratulated Trump and drew his attention to what they called the ongoing genocide of Christians by the Islamic State in the Middle East and urged him to fulfill promises and help them return home. Carlo Kooktapeh Ganjeh of the US chapter of the Assyrian Universal Alliance also said: "I extend our heartfelt congratulations to you for your election as the President of the United States,"

=== European Union ===
President of the European Council Donald Tusk congratulated Trump and invited him to an EU-US summit to improve co-operation.

- European Commission president Jean-Claude Juncker suggested Trump's election could imperil relations between the two entities "in their foundation and in their structure." He told an unnamed conference in Luxembourg on November 11 that Trump's statements on security policy could lead to "pernicious" consequences. He further criticized Trump's alleged ignorance of Europe in recalling one of his statements at a mid-June rally in Atlanta in which he described Belgium as "a beautiful city". "We will need to teach the president-elect what Europe is and how it works." He further warned that E.U. eurocrats would "waste" at least two years before Trump tours a world "he does not know." He questioned Trump's views about global trade, climate policy and Western security.

=== ISIS ===
The Islamic State of Iraq and the Levant (ISIL/ISIS) reportedly celebrated Trump's victory, claiming it would help strengthen recruitment and writing "Rejoice with support from Allah, and find glad tidings in the imminent demise of America at the hands of Trump."

- Al-Minbar Jihadi Media, an Islamic State-affiliated network, recently wrote online: "Trump's win of the American presidency will bring hostility of Muslims against America as a result of his reckless actions, which show the overt and hidden hatred against them."

=== NATO ===
Secretary-General Jens Stoltenberg, whose organization Trump has said was "obsolete" during the campaign, said:

US leadership is as important as ever. Our Alliance has brought together America's closest friends in times of peace and of conflict for almost 70 years. A strong NATO is good for the United States, and good for Europe. We face a challenging new security environment, including hybrid warfare, cyber attacks, the threat of terrorism. NATO has responded with determination to the new security situation. But we have more work to do. And I look forward to meeting Mr. Trump soon, and welcoming him to Brussels for the NATO Summit next year to discuss the way forward.

He added: "NATO's security guarantee is a treaty commitment and all allies have made a solemn commitment to defend each other and this is something which is absolute and unconditioned." He reminded that NATO was part of Operation Enduring Freedom and that NATO "is important both for collective defence in Europe and to provide help and play a role in the fight against international terrorism."

== Financial markets ==
The Mexican peso rallied in the day before the election on speculation Trump would lose over his alleged anti-Mexican comments, while the stock markets of the world also rallied on speculation Clinton would win. The price of gold, in turn, dropped after days of increasing for the same reason.

After the result, the U.S. dollar and stock markets initially sank, especially in the Asia–Pacific region which was open as the result came in. In like measure, traditional safe haven assets such as sovereign bonds and gold were higher. The Mexican peso fell about 13 percent. Dow Jones futures also fell about 3 percent. The day after the election, however, the Dow Jones rose 257 points despite the "knee-jerk reaction" of the night before. The Dow Jones continued to rise over the week, and on November 10 it reached a record high, experiencing its best week since 2011. However, unlike most other global markets, Russia's MICEX rose after the result.

In the weeks following the election, as Trump gradually formed his pro-business cabinet, U.S. stock markets rallied strongly and the Dow Jones Industrial Average flirted with the 20,000-point level. The U.S. dollar also gained significant value.

== Media ==
On November 10 the Toronto Star reported that the website of Immigration, Refugees and Citizenship Canada crashed when it was flooded with a large increase in traffic on election night. The increase in traffic was said to be 5 times larger than normal, and the percent of requests coming from the United States increased from the normal ten percent to fifty percent of all requests.

North Korea's Rodong Sinmun wrote: "It has burdened the new administration with the difficulty of facing the Juche nuclear state," referring to the North Korean state ideology often translated as "self-reliance." The article did not mention Trump by name, but declared "it was high time" that the U.S. took action to resolve tensions on the Korean Peninsula. The editorial maintained that North Korea would never give up its nuclear weapons and referred to comments made last month by US Director of National Intelligence James Clapper, who called efforts to denuclearize North Korea a "lost cause." The publication declared Washington plans "an outdated illusion."

== Academia ==
"Oraib Rantawi, head of Al Quds Centre for Political Studies, said Jordan is one of the 'very few' countries that are not worried about who is the US President, as the Kingdom has maintained 'a very stable and wise relationship' with the US administration regardless of who has been in the Oval Office." Mauritian economist Rajiv Seervansingh suggested a Donald Trump administration would have both a direct and an indirect impact on the Mauritian economy and stated:

Nothing as such will change with Donald Trump being the President of the USA. We mostly deal with the USA via the AGOA. There is no direct threat to our economy. Exportations through the AGOA will continue. We still need to figure out Trump's political and economic policies. If the President-elect decides to scrap the various deals on imports, it will have a negative impact on international trade. Then Mauritius might be affected by this. If the dollar depreciates, exports will suffer as exporters will get less revenue.

== Religious ==
Justin Welby, the Archbishop of Canterbury of the Church of England and symbolic head of the Anglican Communion, called for "reconciliation" and he also pledged to "pray for all the people of the United States." Patriarch Kirill of Moscow, the head of the Russian Orthodox Church, offered "heartfelt congratulations" to Trump and a hope that he would bring change to American domestic and foreign policy.

== Others ==
An anti-Trump protest in Berlin, Germany in front of the Brandenburg Gate

Residents of Trump's ancestral home of Kallstadt, Germany, have expressed negative opinions of him. People from Melania Trump's hometown of Novo Mesto, Slovenia, congratulated her for becoming the first lady of the United States. International protests against the election of Trump occurred in the United Kingdom, the Philippines, Germany, Canada, Belgium and Australia.

== See also ==
- International opinion polling for the 2016 United States presidential election
- 2017 Women's March
- International reactions to the 2024 United States presidential election
