= Dow futures =

Futures tied to the Dow Jones Industrial Average

Dow futures are financial futures which allow an investor to hedge with or speculate on the future value of various components of the Dow Jones Industrial Average market index. The futures instruments are derived from the Dow Jones Industrial Average as E-mini Dow futures.

== Derived futures ==
All of the Dow derived future contracts are a product of the Chicago Mercantile Exchange (CME). They expire quarterly (March, June, September, and December), and are traded on the CME Globex exchange nearly 24 hours a day, from Sunday afternoon to Friday afternoon.

- E-mini Dow futures (ticker: YM) contract's minimum tick is 1 index points = $5.00 While the performance bond requirements vary from broker to broker, the CME requires $3,550, and continuing equity of $3,200 to maintain the position.

== Contracts ==
Dow futures contracts are commonly used for hedge or speculative financial goals. Dow futures contracts are used to hedge, or offset investment risk by commodity owners (i.e., farmers), or portfolios with undesirable risk exposure offset by the futures position.

== Quotes ==
CME Group provides live feeds for Dow futures and these are published on various websites like Bloomberg.com, CNN Money, DowFutures.org.

== Trading leverage ==
Dow futures trade with a multiplier that inflates the value of the contract to add leverage to the trade. The multiplier for the Dow Jones is 5, essentially meaning that Dow futures are working on 5-1 leverage. If the Dow futures are trading at 10,000, a single futures contract would have a market value of $50,000. For every 1 point the Dow Jones Industrial Average fluctuates, the Dow futures contract will increase or decrease by $5. The result is that a trader who believed the market would rally could simply acquire Dow futures and make a huge amount of profit as a result of the leverage factor; if the market were to rise to 14,000, for instance, from the current 10,000, each Dow futures contract would gain $20,000 in value (4,000 point rise x 5 leverage factor = $20,000).

== US tax advantages ==
In the United States, broad-based index futures receive special tax treatment under the IRS 60/40 rule. Stocks held longer than one year qualify for favorable capital gains tax treatment, while stocks held one year or less are taxed at ordinary income. However, proceeds from index futures contracts traded in the short term are taxed 60 percent at the favorable capital gains rate, and only 40 percent as ordinary income. Also, losses on NASDAQ futures can be carried back up to 3 years, and tax reporting is significantly simpler, as they qualify as Section 1256 Contracts.

== See also ==
- E-mini
- NASDAQ futures
- S&P futures
- E-mini S&P
- Derivative (finance)
- 1256 Contract
