= NASDAQ futures =

Financial contracts for investors

NASDAQ futures are financial futures which launched on June 21, 1999. It is the financial contract futures that allow an investor to hedge with or speculate on the future value of various components of the NASDAQ market index.

Several futures instruments are derived from the Nasdaq composite index, these include the E-mini NASDAQ composite futures, the E-mini NASDAQ biology futures, the NASDAQ-100 futures, and the E-mini NASDAQ-100 futures.

== NASDAQ derived futures ==
All of the NASDAQ derived future contracts are a product of the Chicago Mercantile Exchange (CME). They expire quarterly (March, June, September, and December), and are traded on the CME Globex exchange nearly 24 hours a day, from Sunday afternoon to Friday afternoon.

- E-mini NASDAQ futures (ticker: QCN) contract's tick is .50 index point = $10.00 While the performance bond requirements vary from broker to broker, the CME requires equity ranging from $3,200-$4,000 to maintain the position.
- E-mini NASDAQ biotechnology futures (ticker: BIO) contract's tick is .25 index point =$5.00 While the performance bond requirements vary from broker to broker, the CME requires equity ranging from $3,000-$3,750 to maintain the position.
- NASDAQ-100 futures (ticker: ND) contract's tick is .25 index point = $25.00 While the performance bond requirements vary from broker to broker, the CME requires equity ranging from $14,000-$17,500 to maintain the position.
- E-mini NASDAQ-100 futures (ticker: NQ) contract's tick is .25 index point = $5.00 While the performance bond requirements vary from broker to broker, the CME requires equity ranging from $2,800-$3,500 to maintain the position.

== Quotes ==
CME Group provides live feeds for Nasdaq Futures and these are published on various websites like Bloomberg.com, CNN Money, NasdaqFutures.org.

== Trading strategies ==
Futures contracts are commonly used for hedge or speculative financial goals. Futures contracts are used to hedge, or offset investment risk by commodity owners (i.e., farmers), or portfolios with undesirable risk exposure offset by the futures position.

Futures are also widely used to speculate trading profits. Futures trading is skyrocketing – CME's E-mini contracts averaged 3.5 million contracts a day in 2008, a 37 percent yearly increase in volume, while equity volume increased only 2 percent for the same period of time. However studies reveal that hedging strategies still dominate speculation trade activity in every futures market studied.

Investment in trading algorithms research (a mathematical rule set for futures trading entry, exit, and stop loss points often calculated and executed by computer) is phenomenal. Investment banking firm Goldman Sachs devotes more of its resources, tens of millions annually, to developing trading algorithms than it does on trade desk staffing. Trading algorithms may be as exotic as biology theorems like neural networks applied to financial market trading by Gang Dong of Rutgers University, or completely based on current market time/price analysis.

== US tax advantages ==
In the United States broad-based index futures receive special tax treatment under the IRS 60/40 rule. Stocks held longer than one year qualify for favorable capital gains tax treatment, while stocks held one year or less are taxed at ordinary income. However, proceeds from index futures contracts traded in the short term are taxed 60 percent at the favorable capital gains rate, and only 40 percent as ordinary income. Also, losses to NASDAQ futures can be carried back up to 3 years, and tax reporting is significantly simpler, as they qualify as Section 1256 Contracts.

== See also ==
- E-mini
- Dow futures
- S&P futures
- E-mini S&P
- Derivative (finance)
- Algorithmic trading
- 1256 Contract
