= E-mini =

Futures contracts on the Chicago Mercantile Exchange

E-minis are futures contracts that represent a fraction of the value of standard futures. They are traded primarily on the Chicago Mercantile Exchange (CME). As of April, 2011, CME lists 44 unique E-mini contracts, of which approximately 10 have average daily trading volumes of over 1,000 contracts.

Some E-mini contracts provide trading advantages, including high liquidity, greater affordability for individual investors due to lower margin requirements than the full-size contracts, and round-the-clock trading 23.25 hours a day from Sunday afternoon to Friday afternoon. Under U.S. tax law, E-minis may qualify as 1256 Contracts, and benefit from several tax advantages as well.

The risk of loss is also amplified by the higher leverage.

== Symbology ==
Most E-mini futures expire quarterly (with the exception of agricultural products), in March, June, September, and December. An E-mini future symbol is formed by starting with the root symbol and adding the expiration month letter (the same as for futures) and the last digit of the expiration year. For example, the E-mini S&P 500 expiring in December 2012 has the symbol ESZ2.

== E-mini contracts ==
The table below lists some of the more popular E-mini contracts, with the initial and maintenance margins required by CME. Note that individual brokers may require different margin amounts (also called performance bonds).

E-minis
E-mini contract	Exchange	Ticker symbol	Multiplier	Tick size	Tick value	Initial margin	Maintenance margin	Average Daily Volume in 2018
E-Mini S&P 500 (Dollar)	CME	ES	$50	0.25	$12.50	$13,200	$12,000	1,766,663
Micro E-mini S&P 500	CME	MES	$5	0.25	$1.25	$1,320	$1,200	
E-Mini S&P 500 (Euro)	CME	EME	€50	0.25	€12.50	€6,188	€4,950	
E-mini Dow ($5) Futures	CME	YM	$5	1	$5	$13,200	$12,000	239,382
Micro E-mini Dow	CME	MYM	$0.50	1	$0.50	$1,320	$1,200	
E-mini S&P MidCap 400 Futures	CME	EMD	$100	0.10	$10	$7,500	$6,000	19,647
E-mini S&P SmallCap 600 Futures	CME	SMC	$100	0.10	$10	$3,250	$2,600	0
E-mini NASDAQ-100 Futures	CME	NQ	$20	0.25	$5	$16,500	$15,000	492,839
Micro E-mini Nasdaq-100	CME	MNQ	$2	0.25	$0.50	$1,500	$1,500	
E-mini NASDAQ Composite Futures	CME	QCN	$20	0.50	$10	$4,000	$3,200	
E-mini NASDAQ Biotechnology Futures	CME	BIO	$50	0.10	$5	$3,750	$3,000	
E-mini S&P CNX Nifty (Nifty 50) futures	CME	EMF	$10	0.5	$5	$3,125	$2,500	216
E-mini FTSE/XINHUA China 25 Futures	CME	FXN	$5	5	$25	$13,750	$11,000	
E-mini JPY/USD Futures	CME	J7	6,250,000 Japanese yen	$.000001	$6.25	$3,038	$2,250	648
E-mini EUR/USD Futures	CME	E7	62,500 euro	$.0001	$6.25	$2,025	$1,500	4,859
E-mini Consumer Discretionary Select Sector Futures	CME	XAY	$100	0.10	$10	$3,125	$2,500	944
E-mini Consumer Staples Select Sector Futures	CME	XAP	$100	0.10	$10	$1,750	$1,400	1,335
E-mini Energy Select Sector Futures	CME	XAF	$250	0.05	$12.50	$6,500	$5,200	1,823
E-mini Health Care Select Sector Futures	CME	XAV	$100	0.10	$10	$2,500	$2,000	1,207
E-mini Industrial Select Sector Futures	CME	XAI	$100	0.10	$10	$3,125	$2,500	1,094
E-mini Materials Select Sector Futures	CME	XAB	$100	0.10	$10	$3,125	$2,500	668
E-mini Technology Select Sector Futures	CME	XAK	$100	0.10	$10	$1,750	$1,400	1,945
E-mini Utilities Select Sector Futures	CME	XAU	$100	0.10	$10	$2,500	$2,000	2,057
Mini-Sized Corn Futures	CME (formerly CBOT)	YC	1,000 bushels (~ 25 Metric Tons)	$0.00125	$1.25	$473	$350	472
Mini-sized Soybean Futures	CME (formerly CBOT)	YK	1,000 bushels (~ 27 metric tons)	$0.00125	$1.25	$945	$700	1,086
Mini-sized Wheat Futures	CME (formerly CBOT)	YW	1,000 bushels (~ 27 metric tons)	$0.00125	$1.25	$810	$600	349
E-mini Light Sweet Crude Oil (Financial)	CME (formerly NYMEX)	QM	500 barrels	$0.025	$12.50	$3,375	$2,500	18,621
E-mini Natural Gas Futures	CME (formerly NYMEX)	QG	2,500 million BTUs	$0.005	$12.50	$1,013	$750	1,718
E-mini Heating Oil - Financial Futures	CME (formerly NYMEX)	QH	21,000 gallons	$0.001	$21	$3,206	$2,375	0
E-mini New York Harbor RBOB Gasoline Futures	CME (formerly NYMEX)	QU	21,000 gallons	$0.0001	$2.10	$3,881	$2,875	0
COMEX E-Mini Gold Futures	CME (formerly COMEX)	QO	50 troy ounces	$0.25	$12.5	$3,376	$2,500	383
E-mini Silver Futures	CME (formerly COMEX)	6Q	1,000 troy ounces	$0.005	$5	$2,349	$1,740	53
COMEX miNY Copper	CME (formerly COMEX)	QC	12,500 pounds	$0.002	$25	$2,869	$2,125	21
Russell 1000® Index Mini Futures	ICE (formerly NYBOT)	RF	$100	$0.10	$10			727
Russell 2000® Index Mini Futures	ICE (formerly NYBOT)	TF	$50	$0.10	$5			150,100
Micro E-mini Russell 2000	CME	M2K	$5	0.10	$0.50			

== E-mini options ==
Options on E-minis exist for the E-mini S&P 500 and the E-mini NASDAQ-100.

== See also ==
- E-mini S&P
- E-micro
- Dow futures
- NASDAQ futures
- S&P futures
- 1256 Contract
