= Small cap =

Small cap may refer to:

- Small cap company, a company whose market capitalization is under $1 billion
- Small capital letter

== See also ==
- Small Cap Liquidity Reform Act of 2013
- Small capitalism or small business
