= Alzugaray =

Alzugaray is a surname. Notable people with the surname include:

- Carlos Alzugaray Treto (born 1943), Cuban diplomat and educator
- Carlos Martín Alzugaray Lavaggi, Cuban scouting pioneer
- Domingo Alzugaray (1932–2017), Argentine-born Brazilian actor and journalist
- Lisandro Alzugaray (born 1990), Argentine footballer
