= E-micro =

Futures contract in the United States

An E-micro is a futures contract traded on the Chicago Mercantile Exchange (CME) Globex electronic trading platform, that represents an even smaller fraction of the value of the normal futures contracts than the corresponding E-mini.

Currently, CME offers one E-micro stock market index contract, E-micro S&P CNX Nifty (Nifty 50) Futures, with a notional value of $2 x the S&P CNX Nifty index of Indian stocks, and E-micro contracts for a number of currency futures pegged against the US Dollar (AUD, CAD, CHF, EUR, GBP, JPY). E-micro gold futures contracts were introduced in October 2010.

On 11 March 2019 CME Group announced the launch of Micro E-mini futures on the S&P 500, Nasdaq-100, Russell 2000 and Dow Jones Industrial Average indexes. The new contracts will be one-tenth the size of existing E-mini futures, and are set to be available for trading in May 2019.

== E-micro contracts ==
The table below lists some of the more popular E-micro contracts, with the initial and maintenance margin required by the issuing exchange. Note that individual brokers may require different margin amounts (also called performance bonds).

E-micros
E-micro contract	Exchange	Ticker symbol	Multiplier	Tick size	Tick value	Initial margin	Maintenance margin
E-micro S&P CNX Nifty (Nifty 50) Futures	CME	MNF	$5 x Index	$1.25	0.25	$3,125	$2,500
E-micro EUR/USD Futures	CME	M6E	12,500 euros	US$0.0001/EUR	$1.25	$405	$300
E-micro Gold Futures	CME	MGC	10 troy ounces	$0.10	$1	$675	$500

== See also ==
- E-mini
