= Small Cap Liquidity Reform Act of 2013 =

- Long title: To amend the Securities Exchange Act of 1934 to provide for an optional pilot program allowing certain emerging growth companies to increase the tick sizes of their stocks.
- Announced in: the 113th United States Congress
- Sponsored by: Rep. Sean P. Duffy (R, WI-7)
- Number of co-sponsors: 1

Codification
- Acts affected: Securities Exchange Act of 1934
- U.S.C. sections affected: 15 U.S.C. § 78k–1
- Agencies affected: United States Congress, U.S. Securities and Exchange Commission

Legislative history
- Introduced in the House as H.R. 3448 by Rep. Sean P. Duffy (R, WI-7) on November 12, 2013; Committee consideration by United States House Committee on Financial Services

The Small Cap Liquidity Reform Act of 2013 (H.R. 3448) was a bill that was intended to increase the liquidity on the stock market of stocks belonging to emerging growth companies. It would allow small companies to choose a tick size of $0.05 or $0.10 instead of the standard $0.01. To participate, companies would need to have stock prices of over $1.00 and revenues of less than $750 million.

It was introduced into the United States House of Representatives during the 113th United States Congress.

== Background ==
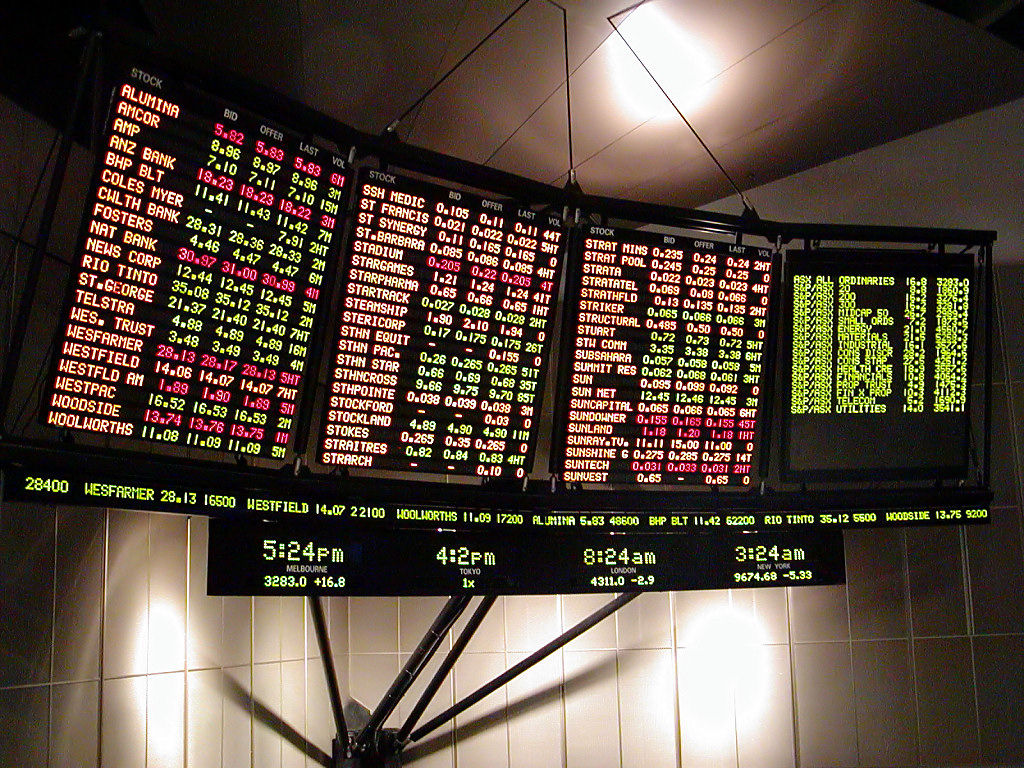
E-ticker

In financial markets, a tick size is the smallest increment (tick) by which the price of stocks, futures contracts or other exchange-traded instrument can move. Current rules from the Securities and Exchange Commission, which regulates the stock market, set the tick at $0.01 increments. This change was made in 2000 with the goal of increasing trading in large company stocks, but it had the side effect of reducing the trading on small company stocks. This pilot program would enable smaller companies to choose larger tick sizes that would "increase the liquidity and capital availability necessary for emerging... companies to be successful on the public market."

== Provisions of the bill ==
This summary is based largely on the summary provided by the Congressional Research Service, a public domain source.

The Small Cap Liquidity Reform Act of 2013 would amend the Securities Exchange Act of 1934 to establish a liquidity pilot program for securities of emerging growth companies (EGC) with total annual gross revenues of less than $750 million, under which those securities shall be quoted using either: (1) a minimum increment of $0.05, (2) a minimum increment of $0.10, or (3) the increment at which the securities would be quoted without regard to such minimum increments.

The bill would repeal the requirement for a Securities and Exchange Commission (SEC) study examining the transition to trading and quoting securities in one penny increments, known as decimalization.

The bill would require EGC securities quoted at a minimum increment of $0.05 or $0.10 to be traded at either such minimum increment or at one permitted by SEC regulations.

The bill would prescribe procedures for an EGC board of directors to elect either to opt out or to change the minimum increment.

The bill would prescribe pricing and trading procedures governing securities trading below $1.00.

The bill would direct the SEC to require an EGC under this Act to submit additional reports and disclosures.

The bill would shield an issuer from liability for losses caused solely by the quoting or trading of its securities at a minimum increment of $0.05, $0.10, or another SEC-authorized increment.

The bill would direct the SEC to report biannually to Congress on: (1) the quoting and trading of securities in increments permitted by this Act, and (2) the extent to which such quoting and trading increases liquidity and active trading by incentivizing capital commitment, research coverage, and brokerage support.

== Congressional Budget Office report ==
This summary is based largely on the summary provided by the Congressional Budget Office, as ordered reported by the House Committee on Financial Services on November 13, 2013. This is a public domain source.

The Congressional Budget Office (CBO) estimates that implementing H.R. 3448 would have an insignificant effect on gross spending by the Securities and Exchange Commission (SEC) to establish a pilot program that would change the minimum increment that the price of a stock could change (the tick size) for certain securities. Pay-as-you-go procedures do not apply to this legislation because it would not affect direct spending or revenues.

H.R. 3448 would establish a five-year program that would allow the price of securities issued by smaller companies to change in increments of 5 or 10 cents, rather than the penny increments that are currently the standard for most stocks traded on U.S. stock exchanges. Under the pilot program the SEC would set the tick size for certain small companies at 5 cents; however, those companies would have the option to select a 10-cent increment. Further, the program would allow a one-time option to change the tick size from 5 cents to 10 cents or vice versa. H.R. 3448 also would require the SEC to submit biannual reports to the Congress showing the extent to which different tick sizes are affecting liquidity and trading activity. CBO expects that changes in the workload of the SEC to implement the pilot program would not be significant because the agency has already begun efforts to develop such a program.

H.R. 3448 would impose intergovernmental and private-sector mandates, as defined in the Unfunded Mandates Reform Act (UMRA), by providing liability protection to issuers of securities of companies participating in the pilot program. Such issuers would not be liable for any losses caused by the quoting or trading of their securities at increments established under the program. Providing such protection would impose a mandate on both public and private investors that would otherwise be able to sue the issuers to recover losses related to tick size. The protection also would impose an intergovernmental mandate by preempting state and local liability laws.

The cost of the mandate would be the forgone value of awards and settlements in such claims. Because the securities of companies covered by the liability protection are more risky than other securities, few public entities invest in them, and those that do limit the size of such investments. Consequently, CBO estimates that any potential losses tied to the mandate would be small. In addition, the costs, if any, of the preemption would be small because it would impose no duty that would result in additional spending or a loss of revenues. Therefore, CBO estimates the cost to public entities of complying with the mandates in the bill would fall below the annual threshold for intergovernmental mandates established in UMRA ($76 million in 2014, adjusted annually for inflation).

Because of uncertainty about both the value of awards in such cases and the number of claims that would be filed in the absence of this provision, CBO cannot estimate the level of potential awards or settlements that would otherwise accrue to private investors. Therefore, CBO cannot determine whether the cost of the mandate would exceed the annual threshold established in UMRA for private-sector mandates ($152 million in 2014, adjusted annually for inflation).

In addition to those mandates, the bill would impose a private-sector mandate on companies in the pilot program established in the bill by requiring them to notify the SEC if they elect to not participate. Based on information from the SEC, CBO estimates that the cost to comply with that mandate would be minimal.

== Procedural history ==
The Small Cap Liquidity Reform Act of 2013 was introduced into the United States House of Representatives on November 12, 2013, by Rep. Sean P. Duffy (R, WI-7). It was referred to the United States House Committee on Financial Services, which held a consideration and markup session on November 14, 2013. The committee ordered the bill reported (amended) with a vote of 57–0 on November 14, 2013. The bill was reported alongside House Report 113-342 on February 5, 2014. On February 7, 2014, House Majority Leader Eric Cantor announced that H.R. 3448 would be on the House schedule for February 11 or 12, 2014, to be considered under a suspension of the rules.

== Debate and discussion ==
The Biotechnology Industry Organization spoke out in favor of the bill, with President Jim Greenwood saying that "the current one-size-fits-all tick size does not reflect the realities of the market and subjects smaller issuers to the same trading framework as large, multinational companies with exponentially higher trading volumes and market caps." Greenwood went on to say that "BIO supports the Small Cap Liquidity Reform Act because it takes into account the unique nature of the trading environment that small companies face as well as the high capital burden of biotech R&D."

== See also ==
- List of bills in the 113th United States Congress
