= Dealer equity option =

A dealer equity option is any equity option listed on a qualified board of exchange, that is bought or granted by an options dealer (any person registered with an appropriate national securities exchange as a market maker or specialist in listed options). The dealer should be registered with the qualified board of exchange where the option is listed.

Under U.S. tax law, a dealer equity option qualifies as a 1256 Contract, and benefits from several tax advantages.

== See also ==
- 1256 Contract
