= Percentage in point =

Currency exchange rate fluctuation

In foreign exchange markets (forex), a percentage in point (pip) is a unit of change in an exchange rate of a currency pair. A pip is the smallest whole unit price move that an exchange rate can make, based on forex market convention.

It's important because forex trading involves tiny fluctuations in exchange rates, and Pips provides a standardized way to express these changes. By using Pip, traders can easily understand and discuss price movements, and calculate profits and losses, and manage risks more effectively.

The major currencies (except the Japanese yen) are traditionally priced to four decimal places, and a pip is one unit of the fourth decimal place: for dollar currencies this is to 1/100 of a cent. For the yen, a pip is one unit of the second decimal place, because the yen is much closer in value to one-hundredth of other major currencies.

In the forward foreign exchange market, the time value adjustment made to the spot rate is quoted in pips, or FX points or forward points.

A pip is sometimes confused with the smallest unit of change in a quote, i.e. the tick size. Currency pairs are often quoted to four decimal places, but the tick size in a given market may be, for example, 5 pips or 1/2 pip.

== Example ==
If the currency pair of the Euro and the U.S. Dollar (EUR/USD) is trading at an exchange rate of 1.3000 (€1 = US$1.3) and the rate changes to 1.3010, the price ratio increases by 10 pips.

In this example, if a trader buys 5 standard lots (i.e. 5 × 100,000 = 500,000) of EUR/USD, paying US$650,000 and closes the position after the 10 pips' appreciation, the trader will receive US$650,500 with a profit of US$500 (i.e. 500,000 (5 standard lots) × 0.0010 = US$500). Most retail trading by speculators is conducted in margin accounts, requiring only a small percentage (typically 1%) of the purchase price as equity for the transaction. The Japanese Yen is an exception to this rule because of its worth against the US dollar being 0.01.

If the NZD/USD spot is trading at 0.8325 and the NZD/USD 1-year forward contract is traded at −270 pips, the outright 1-year forward is priced at 0.8055 (= 0.8325 − 0.0270).

== Fractional pips ==
Electronic trading platforms have brought greater price transparency and price competition to the foreign exchange markets. Several trading platforms have extended the quote precision, or "tick size", for most of the major currency pairs by an additional decimal point; the rates are displayed in 1/10 pip.

== Table of pip values ==
The table portrays pip values for selected currencies as used by Fenics MD for their forward contracts or non-deliverable forwards.

Currency	Pip value
EURUSD	US$0.0001
GBPUSD	US$0.0001
USDJPY	¥0.01
USDCAD	CA$0.0001
AUDUSD	US$0.0001
USDCHF	SFr 0.0001
NZDUSD	US$0.0001
USDDKK	0.0001 kr.
USDSEK	0.0001 kr
USDNOK	0.0001 kr
USDHKD	HK$0.0001
USDBRL	R$0.0001

== See also ==
- Basis point – One hundredth of one percentage point
- Pip (counting) – Easily countable items
