= Tick size =

Smallest price increment for stock price

In financial markets, the tick size is the smallest price increment in which the prices are quoted. The meaning of the term varies depending on whether stocks, bonds, or futures are being quoted.

== Bonds ==
U.S. mortgage bonds and certain corporate bonds are quoted in increments of one thirty-second (1/32) of one percent. That means that prices will be quoted as, for instance, "99-30" (read as "99 and 30 ticks"), meaning 99 and 30/32 percent of the face value. Prices can also be quoted with a "plus", adding one sixty-fourth (1/64) of one percent or half a tick. That means that a price is quoted as, for instance, "99-30+", meaning 99 and 61/64 percent (or 30.5/32 percent) of the face value. As an example, "par the buck plus" means 100% plus 1/64 of 1% or 100.015625% of face value.

Most European and Asian bond and futures prices are quoted in decimals so the "tick" size is 1/100 of 1%.

== Stocks and futures ==
Tick size is the smallest increment (tick) by which the price of stocks, futures contracts or other exchange-traded instrument can move.

The purpose of having discrete price levels is to balance price priority with time priority. If the tick is too small then too much of a preference is given to price priority meaning that market makers and the general public will have less of an incentive to post their orders well in advance since people can jump ahead of them by increasing their price by a small, virtually inconsequential, fraction. If the tick is too big then the opposite happens and time priority is given far too much of an advantage. The size of a tick is picked to basically balance those two priorities.

Tick sizes can be fixed (e.g., USD 0.0001) or vary according to the current price (common in European markets) with larger increments at higher prices. Heavily-traded stocks are given smaller tick sizes. An instrument price is always a rational number and the tick sizes determine the numbers that are permissible for a given instrument and exchange.

In Europe, MiFID has resulted in a variety of multilateral trading facilities (MTF) with distinct tick size regimes for the same stocks. These differences mean that order routing systems must be aware of every MTF's tick size regime and adjust outgoing orders accordingly. There is now an industry effort underway to harmonise tick sizes. As of 2019, the article 49 of the new MiFID II directive requires trading venues to adopt minimum tick sizes in relation to equity and certain equity-like instruments.

== See also ==
- Commodity tick
- Percentage in point (PIP)
- Penny stocks
