= E-mini S&P =

Stock market index futures contract

E-mini S&P, often abbreviated to "E-mini" (despite the existence of many other E-mini contracts) and designated by the commodity ticker symbol ES, is a stock market index futures contract traded on the Chicago Mercantile Exchange. The notional value of one contract is 50 times the value of the S&P 500 stock index; thus, for example, on December 04, 2024, the S&P 500 cash index closed at 6,098.50, making each E-mini contract a $304,925 bet.

== History and structure ==
The contract was introduced by the CME on September 9, 1997, after the value of the existing S&P contract (then valued at 500 times the index, or over $500,000 at the time) became too large for many small traders. The E-mini quickly became the most popular equity index futures contract in the world. The original ("big") S&P contract was subsequently split 2:1, bringing it to 250 times the index. Hedge funds often prefer trading the E-mini over the big S&P since the older ("big") contract still uses the open outcry pit trading method, with its inherent delays, versus the all-electronic Globex system for the E-mini. The current average daily implied volume for the E-mini is over $100 billion, far exceeding the combined traded dollar volume of the underlying 500 stocks.

Following the success of this product, the exchange introduced the E-mini NASDAQ-100 contract, at one fifth of the original NASDAQ-100 index-based contract, and many other "mini" products geared primarily towards small speculators, as opposed to large hedgers.

In June 2005 the exchange introduced a yet smaller product based on the S&P, with the underlying asset being 100 shares of the highly-popular SPDR exchange-traded fund. However, due to the different regulatory requirements, the performance bond (or "margin") required for one such contract is almost as high as that for the five times larger E-mini contract. The product never became popular, with volumes rarely exceeding 10 contracts a day.

The E-mini contract trades from Sunday to Friday 5:00pm – 4:00pm (Chicago Time/CT) with a 15-minute trading halt from 3:15pm to 3:30pm CT. From 4:00pm to 5:00pm is a daily maintenance period.

== Outsized trades ==
According to US government investigations, the sale of 75,000 E-mini contracts by a single trader was the trigger to cause the 2010 Flash Crash. According to the SEC/CFTC report, the firm "accidentally instructed its trading program to dump them all in a series of sell orders over 20 minutes, rather than spreading the sell orders out over a much longer time period". This claim was later addressed by the Chicago Mercantile Exchange, not mentioning any "accident" and implying the program was a methodical hedge whose execution generated "less than 9% of the volume during the" twenty minutes.

On December 7, 2016, multiple buyers purchased around 16,000 E-mini S&P 500, in what was described as a series of stop orders triggered by a single contract trading at 2225.00. The contracts traded as stops, traded "all ... at the same nanosecond", were valued at $1.8 billion. The sequence of trades at new highs was prelude to a sharp market rally for the balance of the day and the two succeeding days. It was the biggest E-mini trade by more than a factor of two in 2016 and attracted comparison to the 2010 flash-crash trade.

== See also ==
- E-mini
- NASDAQ futures
- Futures contract
- Performance bond
