= CNN Business =

US financial information website

- Website type: Financial news
- Available in: English
- Owner: CNN
- Website: cnn.com/business
- Launched: 2001; 25 years ago

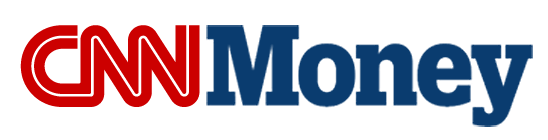
First logo used (2001 – June 2014)

Second logo used until rebrand as CNN Business (June 2014 – October 2018)

CNN Business (formerly CNN Money) is a financial news and information website, operated by CNN. The website was originally formed as a joint venture between CNN.com and Time Warner's Fortune and Money magazines. Since the spin-off of Time Warner's publishing assets as Time Inc. (and their subsequent sale to Meredith Corporation and later, to IAC's Dotdash), the site has since operated as an affiliate of CNN.

== History ==
CNN Money launched in 2001, replacing CNNfn's website. Time Warner had also announced an intention to relaunch the CNNfn television network under the CNN Money moniker, but those plans were apparently scrapped.

Prior to June 2014, the website was operated as a joint venture between CNN and two Time Warner-published business magazines; Fortune and Money. In June 2014, Time Warner's publishing assets were spun-out as Time Inc.; as a result, all three properties launched separate web presences, and CNN Money introduced a new logo that removed the wordmark of Money magazine from its branding. With the re-launch, CNN head Jeff Zucker also promised increased synergies between the website and the CNN channel, such as branded segments and the re-branding of CNN's weekly financial show Your Money as CNNMoney.

In October 2018, CNN re-launched the vertical as CNN Business; the new brand is focused on "digital transformation of business, and how it is disrupting every corner of the global economy". The relaunch came alongside the opening of a new San Francisco bureau. As with CNNMoney, it will be supported by branded segments on CNN television, as well as streaming content.
