= 1256 Contract =

Classification of options contracts in US tax law

A 1256 Contract, as defined in section 1256 of the US Internal Revenue Code, is any regulated futures contracts, foreign currency contracts, non-equity options (broad-based stock index options [including cash-settled ones], debt options, commodity futures options, and currency options), dealer equity options, and any dealer security futures contracts. For US Federal income tax purposes, mark-to-market accounting is used for each 1256 contract as of the end of each tax year, and such contracts are treated as sold for its fair market value on the last business day of such taxable year (i.e. as "closed").

The Internal Revenue Service (IRS) is not clear on whether QQQ, DIA and SPY options should be treated as section 1256 contracts. On one hand, these are seen as equity options, not within the definition of a 1256 Contract, but others consider them as non-equity option and meeting the definition of a "broad-based" index option. Instead, the IRS grants penalty relief if a broker determines in good faith that an index is, or is not, a narrow-based index, following published guidelines.

== Tax advantages ==
Any gain or loss from a 1256 Contract is treated for tax purposes as 40% short-term gain and 60% long-term gain, regardless of holding period. Because most futures contracts are held for less than the 12-month minimum holding period for long-term capital gains tax rates; the gain from any non-1256 contract will typically be taxed at the higher short-term rate. Thus the 1256 Contract designation enhances the marketability based on the after-tax attractiveness of these products. The reason for the implementation of section 1256 was that traders were hedging their short term futures contracts (going long and short at the same time) to transition to the next tax year without paying the short-term capital gains tax on these positions, and were effectively making these positions qualify for long-term tax treatment.

Individuals with a net Section 1256 contract loss can elect to carry it back three years (instead of being carried forward to the following year), starting with the earliest year, but only to a year in which there is a net Section 1256 contracts gain, and only up to the extent of such gain (the carrying back cannot produce a net operating loss for the year).

== See also ==
- 99-year lease
- Securities Exchange Act
